= USS Roche =

Cannon-class destroyer escort

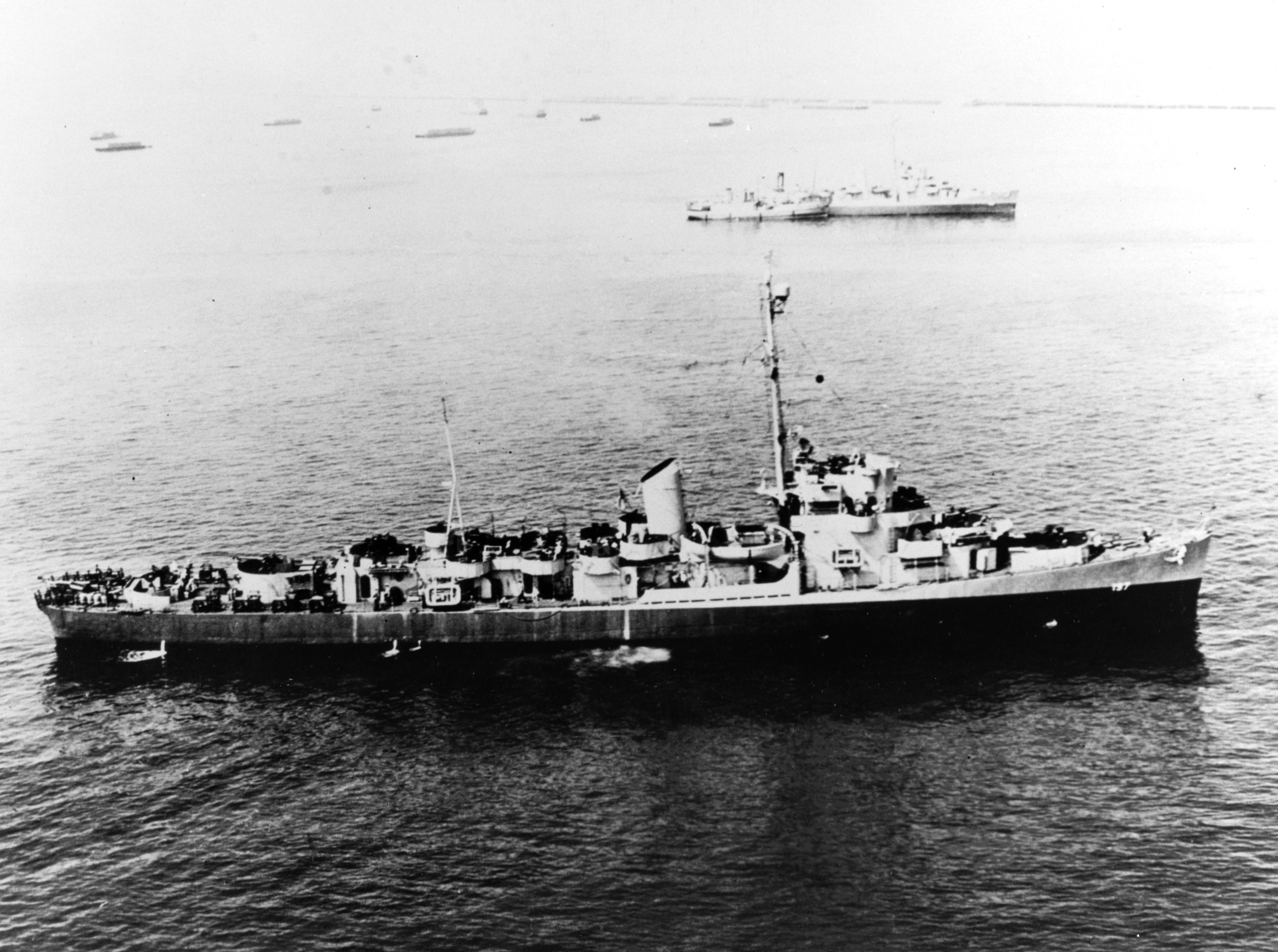

History

United States
- Name: USS Roche
- Namesake: David John Roche
- Builder: Federal Shipbuilding and Drydock Company, Newark, New Jersey
- Laid down: 21 October 1943
- Launched: 9 January 1944
- Commissioned: 21 February 1944
- Stricken: 5 June 1946
- Fate: Scuttled off Yokosuka, 11 March 1946

General characteristics
- Class & type: Cannon-class destroyer escort
- Displacement: 1,240 long tons (1,260 t) standard; 1,620 long tons (1,646 t) full
- Length: 306 ft (93 m) o/a; 300 ft (91 m) w/l
- Beam: 36 ft 10 in (11.23 m)
- Draft: 11 ft 8 in (3.56 m)
- Propulsion: 4 × GM Mod. 16-278A diesel engines with electric drive, 6,000 shp (4,474 kW), 2 screws
- Speed: 21 knots (39 km/h; 24 mph)
- Range: 10,800 nmi (20,000 km) at 12 kn (22 km/h; 14 mph)
- Complement: 15 officers and 201 enlisted
- Armament: 3 × single Mk.22 3"/50 caliber guns; 1 × twin 40 mm Mk.1 AA gun; 8 × 20 mm Mk.4 AA guns; 3 × 21 inch (533 mm) torpedo tubes; 1 × Hedgehog Mk.10 anti-submarine mortar (144 rounds); 8 × Mk.6 depth charge projectors; 2 × Mk.9 depth charge tracks

USS Roche (DE-197) was a Cannon-class destroyer escort in service United States Navy from 1944 to 1945. She hit a mine in late September 1945. As it was uneconomical to repair her, she was scuttled in March 1946.

== Namesake ==
David John Roche was born on 2 December 1918 in Hibbing, Minnesota. He enlisted in the U.S. Naval Reserve as seaman second class on 13 November 1939. He was appointed aviation cadet effective 15 February 1940, designated naval aviator (heavier-than-air), 14 October and became an ensign, USNR, effective 21 October 1940. Following training at Pensacola Naval Air Station, he was assigned to Torpedo Squadron 3 and reported for duty on 1 December. He was officially reported missing in action as of 4 June 1942, when the plane he was piloting was shot down in the Battle of Midway. For pressing home his torpedo attack on Imperial Japanese Navy units in the face of tremendous antiaircraft fire and overwhelming fighter opposition, he was posthumously awarded the Navy Cross.

== History ==
Roche was laid down on 21 October 1943 by the Federal Shipbuilding & Dry Dock Company of Port Newark, New Jersey; launched on 9 January 1944, sponsored by Mrs. Carrie M. Roche; and commissioned at the Brooklyn Navy Yard on 21 February 1944.

=== Atlantic convoys, 1944–1945 ===
Following shakedown off Bermuda, Roche returned to New York on 12 April on 1944. On 21 April she proceeded to Norfolk, Virginia where she served as "schoolship" until assigned on 12 May to TF 63 as escort for convoy UGS-42, en route to Mediterranean ports. The large convoy of 108 ships plus 17 escorts proceeded across the south Atlantic and into the Mediterranean without incident. Then it was one alert after another. German airpower was active in the area. But the convoy reached Bizerte on 2 June without having been attacked. Roche returned to New York on 29 June.

Following refresher training at Casco Bay, Maine Roche departed Norfolk on 22 July with a convoy bound for Bizerte. Returning from Gibraltar as escort to a Liberty ship under tow, she evaded a German U-boat and arrived at the Brooklyn Navy Yard on 9 September for overhaul. On 14 October she departed New York escorting a convoy which reached Plymouth, England on 25 October. Throughout the winter and spring of 1945, she made five more of these trips.

In mid-Atlantic on 13 March 1945, while en route to Southampton, England, Roche rescued 11 men from the water after the collision of USAT J. W. McAndrew and the Béarn.

=== Pacific Fleet, 1945 ===
In May 1945, Roche was ordered to the Pacific Fleet and on 9 June she was underway for Guantanamo Bay for refresher training. She transited the Panama Canal on 1 July; and, after taking on supplies and passengers at San Diego, proceeded to Pearl Harbor where she conducted further training exercises. On 8 August she steamed for Eniwetok, receiving en route, word of the Japanese surrender. Arriving Eniwetok on 16 August, she departed 18 August for Ulithi. She then steamed back to Eniwetok and escorted LCI-520 and LCI-761, carrying occupation troops, to Wake Island. Returning to Eniwetok, she operated on anti-submarine patrol as a precaution against any Japanese submarines which had not heard of the surrender.

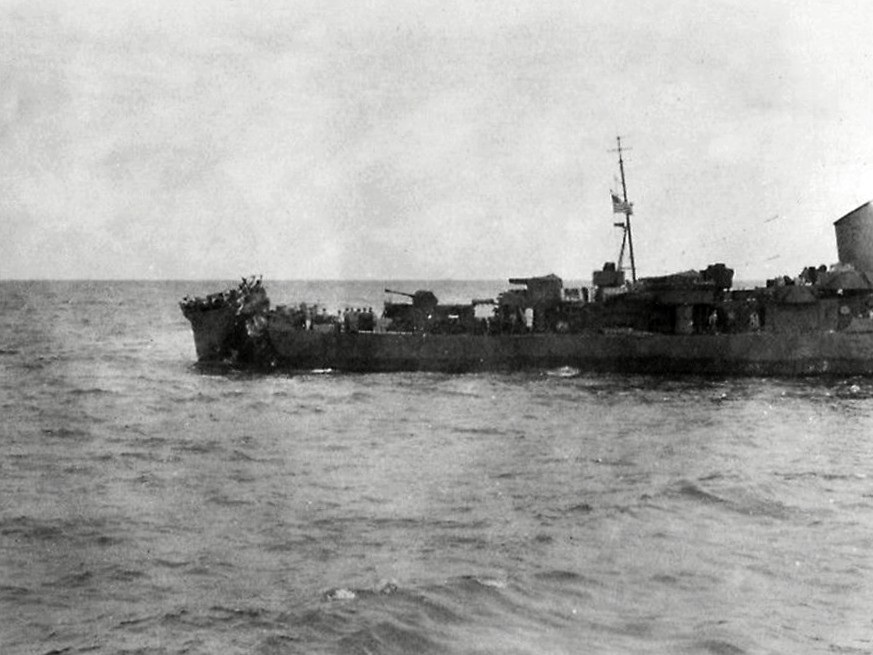
Roche after hitting a mine, 29 September 1945.

On 22 September Roche got underway for Tokyo Bay as escort for the Florence Nightingale (AP-70). Just a few minutes after morning quarters on 29 September, a loud explosion shook the ship from stem to stern and was immediately followed by another. Battle stations were manned before it was learned that the ship had struck a floating mine. The fantail was a mass of twisted steel; but, due to the quick action of repair parties, all watertight hatches in the vicinity were dogged down to keep the ship afloat and a port list was created artificially to aid in maintaining watertight integrity. There were three deaths in the explosion and many injuries. Ten men were transferred to Florence Nightingale. Roche was taken in tow by ATR-35, and 15 days after the surrender papers had been signed on board the USS Missouri, Roche entered Tokyo Bay and moored to repair ship Telamon (ARB-8).

On 18 October a board of inspection and survey decided that Roche was beyond economical repair and recommended that she be cannibalized. Subsequently, decommissioned, Roche's hulk was sunk off Yokosuka on 11 March 1946. She was struck from the Naval Vessel Register on 5 June 1946.
