= USS Weaver =

Cannon-class destroyer escort

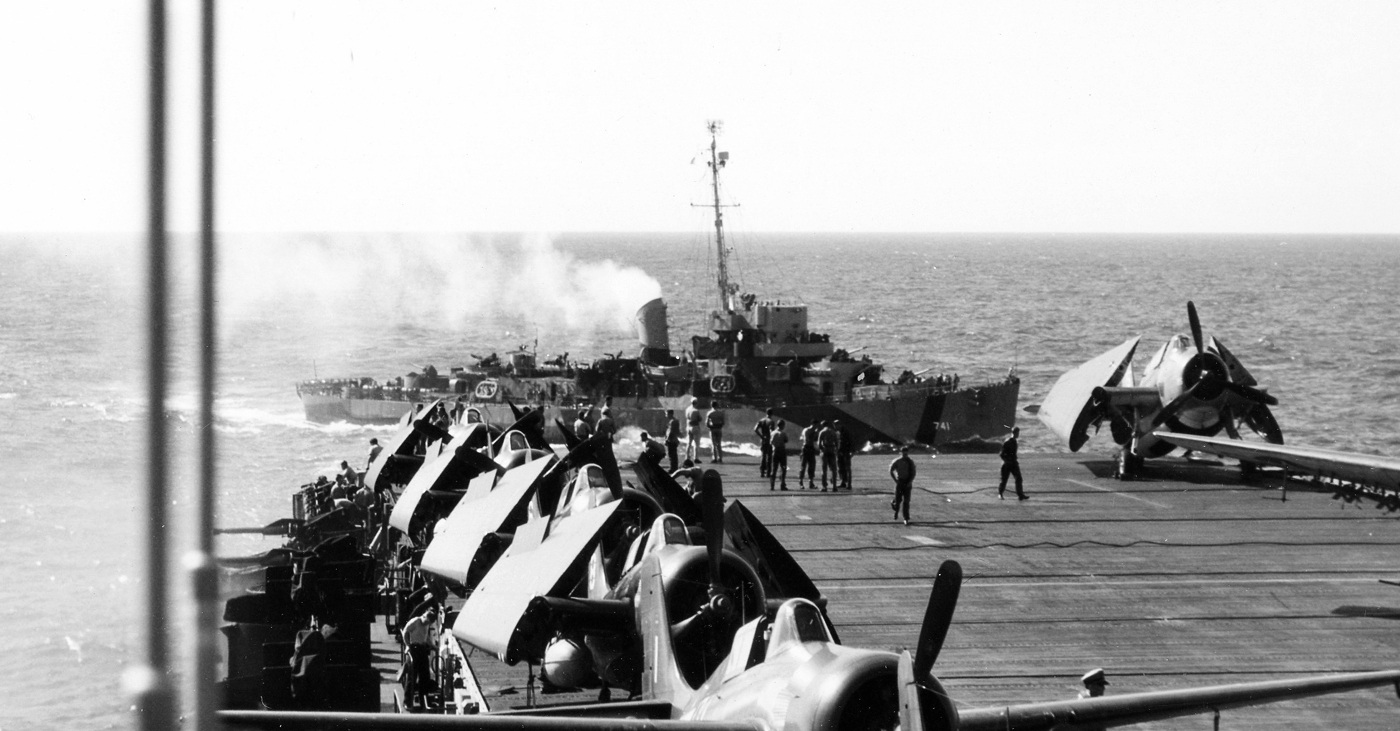
- Weaver passing USS Sargent Bay (CVE-83), 6 January 1945

History

United States
- Name: USS Weaver
- Namesake: Luther Dayton Weaver
- Builder: Western Pipe and Steel Company, Los Angeles, California
- Laid down: 13 March 1943
- Launched: 4 July 1943
- Commissioned: 31 December 1943
- Decommissioned: 3 July 1947
- Stricken: 18 April 1952
- Honors and awards: 9 battle stars (World War II)
- Fate: Sold to Peru, 21 February 1952

Peru
- Name: BAP Rodriguez (DE-163)
- Acquired: 21 February 1952
- Stricken: 1979
- Fate: Broken up, 1979

General characteristics
- Class & type: Cannon-class destroyer escort
- Displacement: 1,240 long tons (1,260 t) standard; 1,620 long tons (1,646 t) full
- Length: 306 ft (93 m) o/a; 300 ft (91 m) w/l
- Beam: 36 ft 10 in (11.23 m)
- Draft: 11 ft 8 in (3.56 m)
- Propulsion: 4 × GM Mod. 16-278A diesel engines with electric drive, 6,000 shp (4,474 kW), 2 screws
- Speed: 21 knots (39 km/h; 24 mph)
- Range: 10,800 nmi (20,000 km) at 12 kn (22 km/h; 14 mph)
- Complement: 15 officers and 201 enlisted
- Armament: 3 × single Mk.22 3"/50 caliber guns; 1 × twin 40 mm Mk.1 AA gun; 8 × 20 mm Mk.4 AA guns; 3 × 21-inch (533 mm) torpedo tubes; 1 × Hedgehog Mk.10 anti-submarine mortar (144 rounds); 8 × Mk.6 depth charge projectors; 2 × Mk.9 depth charge tracks

USS Weaver (DE-741) was a Cannon-class destroyer escort in service with the United States Navy from 1943 to 1947. In 1952, she was sold to Peru, where she served as BAP Rodriguez (D-63) until being decommissioned and scrapped in 1979.

== History ==
=== United States Navy (1943-1952) ===
USS Weaver was named in honor of Luther Dayton Weaver who was killed during the Japanese raid on Pearl Harbor. the ship was laid down on 13 March 1943 at Los Angeles, California, by the Western Pipe and Steel Company; launched on Independence Day 1943; sponsored by Mrs. John Franklin Weaver; and commissioned on 31 December 1943.

Weaver conducted shakedown training along the California coast during the first two months of 1944. On 2 March, she stood out of San Francisco Bay, bound for the western Pacific. The destroyer escort made an overnight stop at Pearl Harbor on 14 and 15 March and then continued her voyage west via Kwajalein. She arrived in Majuro later that month and joined the screen of Task Group (TG) 50.17, the U.S. 5th Fleet replenishment and refueling group. Weaver operated as a unit of the screen of the 5th/3d Fleet logistics group throughout her World War II service.

Operating from the base at Majuro, she escorted the oilers to refueling rendezvous with the fast carriers during their raids on Truk, Satawan, and Ponape in late April and early May. Moving forward to the base at Eniwetok soon thereafter, she continued to protect the logistics group during the assault on Saipan in June. Later that summer, she and her charges kept the carriers in action during the invasion of the Western Carolines and the Palaus. Following that operation, the logistics group moved forward again operating briefly out of Seeadler Harbor at Manus in the Admiralty Islands and then out of Ulithi in the Western Carolines for the remainder of the war.

Ulithi served as the base for TF 58/38 during the last year of the war in the Pacific. Weaver escorted the oilers to Ulithi where they replenished their storage tanks and then back to sea to refill the carriers' oil bunkers. Thus, in 1945, she helped to keep the pressure on the Japanese during the Luzon landings, the Iwo Jima assault, and during the Okinawa campaign. The latter phases of her service also included escort missions in support of the fast carrier raids on the Japanese home islands during the summer of 1945.

When the Japanese capitulated on 15 August 1945, the destroyer escort was at sea with TG 30.8 keeping the carriers in fuel. On 28 August, she carried a prize crew from USS Proteus to the surrendered Japanese submarine I-400 and then entered Sagami Wan, Japan, to begin duty with the occupation forces. For the next month, the warship assisted in the evacuation of former Allied prisoners of war from Japan. On 2 October, however, she concluded her duty in Japan and set sail from Yokosuka, bound for home. Steaming via Pearl Harbor, San Pedro, Los Angeles, and the Panama Canal, she arrived in Philadelphia, Pennsylvania, on 22 November to begin preparations for inactivation.

Late in December, she moved south to Green Cove Springs, Florida, where, though technically still in commission, she joined the Atlantic Reserve Fleet. Weaver was not finally decommissioned until 29 May 1947.

=== Peruvian Navy (1952-1979) ===
Weaver remained at Green Cove Springs until 21 February 1952 at which time she was sold to Peru. Her name was struck from the Navy List on 18 April 1952. She served the Peruvian Navy as BAP Rodriguez (D-63) as a submarine accommodation ship until she was stricken and broken up in 1979.

== Awards ==
Weaver earned nine battle stars during World War II

== In popular culture ==
A brief port broadside view of the ship underway in its Dazzle camouflage paint scheme can be seen in the film The Gallant Hours about one hour and twenty minutes into picture.
