= USS Oswald =

Cannon-class destroyer escort

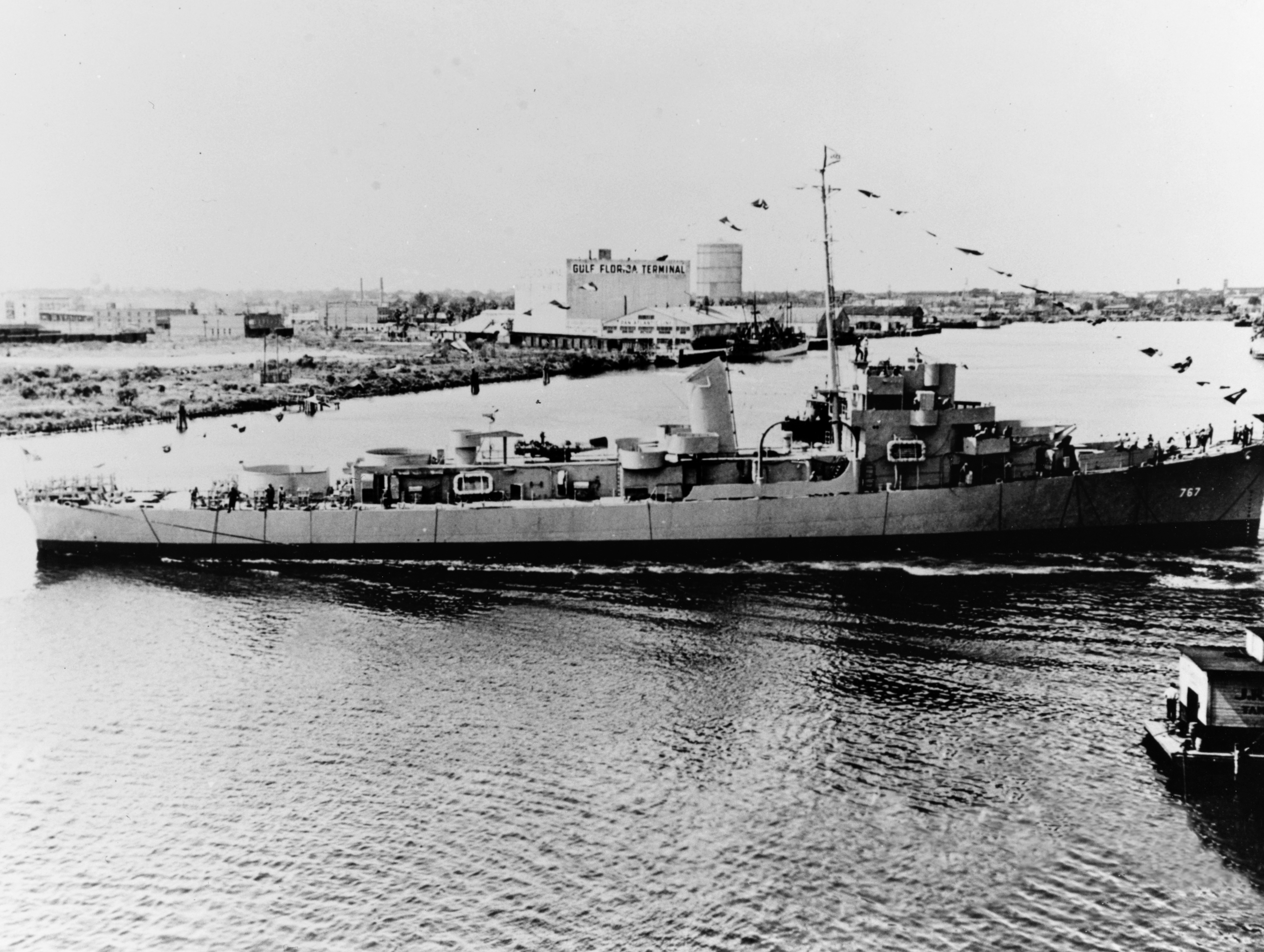

History

United States
- Name: USS Oswald
- Namesake: Harvey Emerson Oswald
- Builder: Tampa Shipbuilding Company, Tampa, Florida
- Laid down: 1 April 1943
- Launched: 25 April 1944
- Commissioned: 12 June 1944
- Decommissioned: 30 April 1946
- Stricken: 1 August 1972
- Fate: Sold for scrapping, 15 October 1973

General characteristics
- Class & type: Cannon-class destroyer escort
- Displacement: 1,240 long tons (1,260 t) standard; 1,620 long tons (1,646 t) full
- Length: 306 ft (93 m) o/a; 300 ft (91 m) w/l
- Beam: 36 ft 10 in (11.23 m)
- Draft: 11 ft 8 in (3.56 m)
- Propulsion: 4 × GM Mod. 16-278A diesel engines with electric drive, 6,000 shp (4,474 kW), 2 screws
- Speed: 21 knots (39 km/h; 24 mph)
- Range: 10,800 nmi (20,000 km) at 12 kn (22 km/h; 14 mph)
- Complement: 15 officers and 201 enlisted
- Armament: 3 × single Mk.22 3"/50 caliber guns; 1 × twin 40 mm Mk.1 AA gun; 8 × 20 mm Mk.4 AA guns; 3 × 21-inch (533 mm) torpedo tubes; 1 × Hedgehog Mk.10 anti-submarine mortar (144 rounds); 8 × Mk.6 depth charge projectors; 2 × Mk.9 depth charge tracks

USS Oswald (DE-767) was a Cannon-class destroyer escort inb service with the United States Navy from 1944 to 1946. She was sold for scrapping in 1973.

== Namesake ==
Harvey Emerson Oswald was born on 11 September 1918 in Columbus, Ohio. He enlisted in the U.S. Naval Reserve in April 1938. Discharged from the reserve at his own request on 3 August 1939, he enlisted in the U. S. Navy the same day. Assigned the following December to USS William B. Preston as a Machinist Mate, Second Class. During the Japanese attack on Darwin, Australia, on 19 February 1942 he manned a .50 caliber machine gun on a PBY Catalina airplane to fire on the Japanese and was killed in the attack. He was posthumously awarded the Silver Star.

== History ==
She was laid down on 1 April 1943 at the Tampa Shipbuilding Co., Tampa, Florida; launched on 25 April 1944; sponsored by Mrs. Zola F. Oswald, mother of the ship's namesake; and commissioned on 12 June 1944.

Following a Bermuda shakedown, Oswald sailed north to Boston, Massachusetts, thence to New York City where she reported for duty with CortDiv 22 in TG 21.5. On 19 August she sailed with Convoy CU-36 on her first transatlantic convoy escort mission. Off Northern Ireland, on 30 August, she hunted unsuccessfully for an enemy submarine after the loss of the tanker SS Jacksonville. Rejoining the convoy, the escort vessel saw the remainder of her charges into Derry, and on 4 September began the voyage back to New York. During the next eight months, she escorted ten additional convoys across the North Atlantic without a loss.

In June 1945, her task group, then designated 61.2, was dissolved and Oswald reported to Quonset Point, Rhode Island, to serve as plane guard during carrier qualification exercises on Croatan (CVE-25). Reassigned in August, she proceeded to southern Florida for similar duties with Mission Bay (CVE-59).

In October, she returned to New York, underwent pre-inactivation overhaul, and then sailed south again. Arriving at Green Cove Springs, Florida, on 9 November, she decommissioned there on 30 April 1946 and joined the Atlantic Reserve Fleet. Transferred to the Reserve Group at Philadelphia, Pennsylvania, in 1951, she remained in reserve until she was sold for scrapping on 15 October 1973.
