= USS Pennewill =

Cannon-class destroyer escort

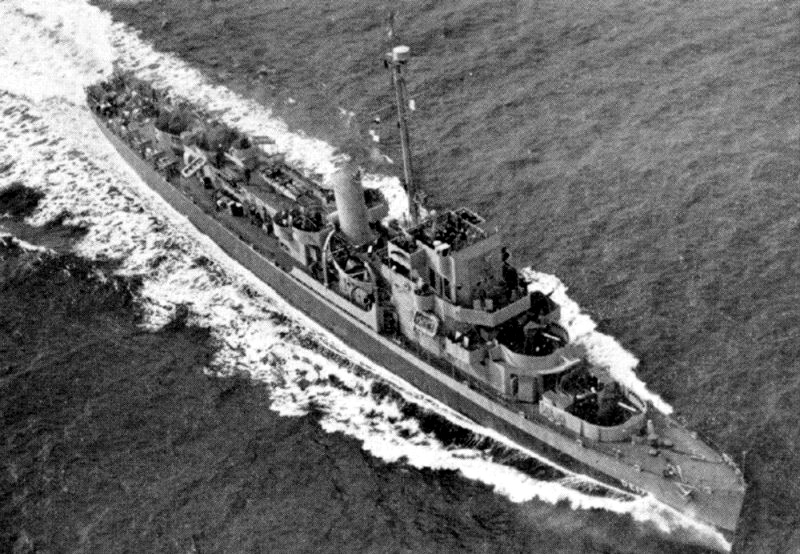

History

United States
- Name: USS Pennewill
- Namesake: William Ellison Pennewill
- Builder: Federal Shipbuilding and Drydock Company, Newark, New Jersey
- Laid down: 26 April 1943
- Launched: 8 August 1943
- Commissioned: 15 September 1943
- Decommissioned: 1 August 1944
- Stricken: 20 July 1953
- Fate: Leased to Brazil, 1 August 1944; Sold to Brazil, 30 June 1953

History

Brazil
- Name: Bertioga (D-21)
- Acquired: 1 August 1944
- Fate: Scrapped, 1964

General characteristics
- Class & type: Cannon-class destroyer escort
- Displacement: 1,240 long tons (1,260 t) standard; 1,620 long tons (1,646 t) full
- Length: 306 ft (93 m) o/a; 300 ft (91 m) w/l
- Beam: 36 ft 10 in (11.23 m)
- Draft: 11 ft 8 in (3.56 m)
- Propulsion: 4 × GM Mod. 16-278A diesel engines with electric drive, 6,000 shp (4,474 kW), 2 screws
- Speed: 21 knots (39 km/h; 24 mph)
- Range: 10,800 nmi (20,000 km) at 12 kn (22 km/h; 14 mph)
- Complement: 15 officers and 201 enlisted
- Armament: 3 × single Mk.22 3-inch/50-caliber guns; 1 × twin 40 mm Mk.1 AA gun; 8 × 20 mm Mk.4 AA guns; 3 × 21 inch (533 mm) torpedo tubes; 1 × Hedgehog Mk.10 anti-submarine mortar (144 rounds); 8 × Mk.6 depth charge projectors; 2 × Mk.9 depth charge tracks

USS Pennewill (DE-175) was a Cannon-class destroyer escort built for the United States Navy during World War II. She served in the Atlantic Ocean and provided escort service against submarine and air attack for Navy vessels and convoys.

== Namesake ==
William Ellison Pennewill was born on 20 February 1907 in Dover, Delaware. He was appointed midshipman on 18 June 1925. He was commissioned ensign on 6 June 1931 and reported for duty under instruction in flying, at the Naval Air Station Pensacola, Florida. His next duty was in Salt Lake City, then with Scouting Squadron 10–S, aboard USS Chicago. On 7 March 1932 he reported for duty with the Aircraft Scouting Force until 2 June 1934, when he was transferred to Bombing Squadron 3–B, aboard USS Ranger. He returned to the Naval Air Station, Pensacola and on 2 August 1941 joined the 16th Bombardment Wing. After serving at the Savannah Air Base, Savannah, Georgia, until 6 March 1942, he was assigned duty involving flying in connection with the fitting out of Escort Scouting Squadron Twelve.

On 29 May 1942, as lieutenant commander, he was in command of the squadron and while serving in this capacity, was killed, 23 June 1942, as a result of an airplane crash, while on duty at the Naval Air Station Kodiak, Alaska. He was posthumously awarded the Distinguished Flying Cross.

== Construction and commissioning ==
The ship was laid down on 26 April 1943 by the Federal Shipbuilding and Dry Dock Co., Newark, New Jersey; launched on 8 August 1943; sponsored by Mrs. Lucie Reilly Pennewill; and commissioned on 15 September 1943.

== World War II Central and South Atlantic operations ==
After shakedown, Pennewill steamed to Trinidad, British West Indies, for convoy escort duty. On 20 November 1943, she departed Trinidad as part of the escort for Convoy TJ–15, arriving Recife, Brazil, on 5 December.

Pennewill was engaged in operations with Task Group 42.2 from December 1943 to April 1944, escorting convoys from Trinidad to Recife, Brazil, and return. She also completed several special missions. From 25 to 27 December 1943 she escorted U.S. Army transport USAT State of Maryland from Trinidad to San Juan, Puerto Rico. From 21 to 22 January 1944, she was escort for British tanker SS Destiny out of Recife to rendezvous with Task Group 41.4.

Pennewill arrived at Bahia, Brazil on 26 April. During the following months she operated with Memphis (CL-13), conducting patrol and escort duty off the coast of Brazil and engaged in training operations in the Bahia-Recife area.

== Post-War Decommissioning ==
On 28 July, she sailed from Recife to Natal, Brazil, where she decommissioned and was leased to the Government of Brazil on 1 August 1944. She was transferred to Brazil on 30 June 1953 and was struck from the Navy Directory on 20 July 1953. Her Brazilian name was Bertioga (D-21). She was scrapped in 1964.
