= USS Swearer =

Cannon-class destroyer escort

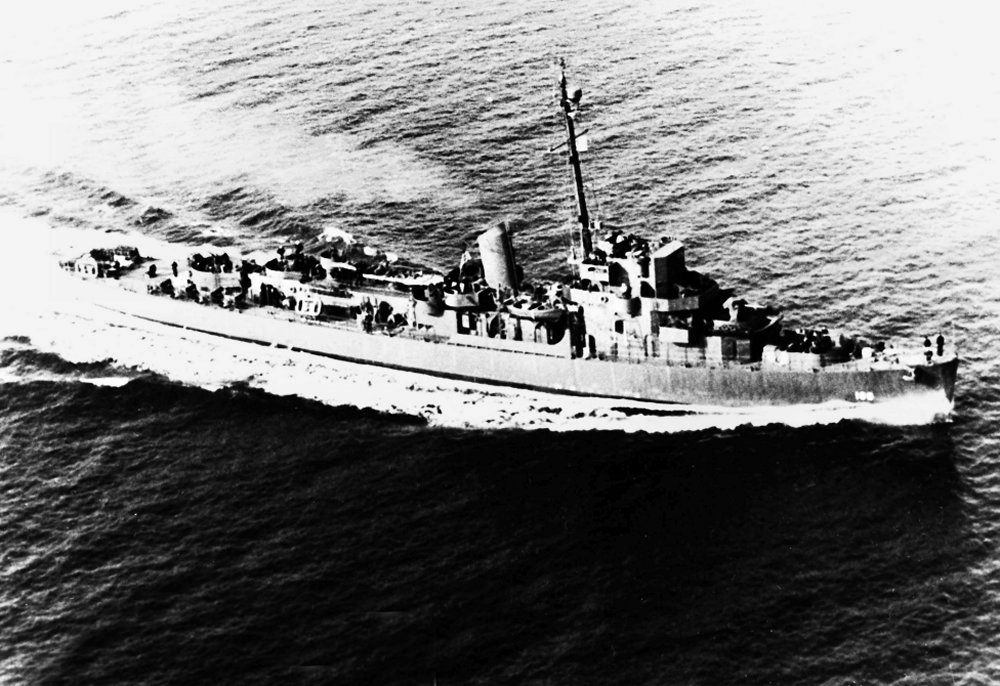
- Destroyer Escort USS Swearer (DE-186)

History

United States
- Name: USS Swearer (DE-186)
- Namesake: Walter John Swearer
- Builder: Federal Shipbuilding and Drydock Company, Newark, New Jersey
- Laid down: 12 August 1943
- Launched: 31 October 1943
- Commissioned: 23 November 1943
- Decommissioned: 25 February 1946
- Stricken: 20 October 1950
- Honors and awards: 9 battle stars (World War II)
- Fate: Transferred to France, 16 September 1950
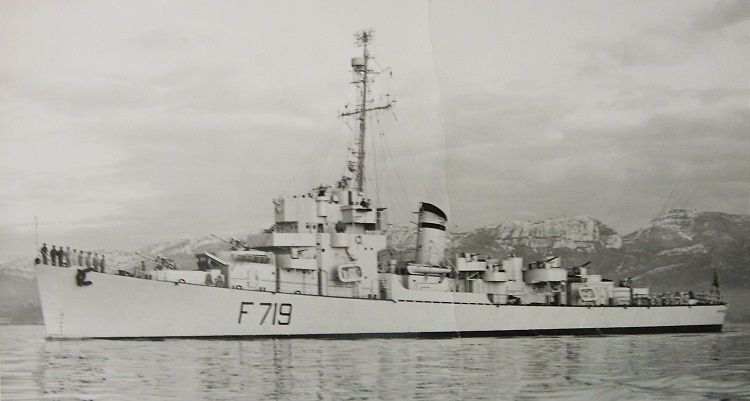
- French Frigate Bambara (F719).

History

France
- Name: Bambara (F719)
- Namesake: Bambara people
- Acquired: 16 September 1950
- Stricken: 1959
- Fate: Broken up, 1959

General characteristics
- Class & type: Cannon-class destroyer escort
- Displacement: 1,240 long tons (1,260 t) standard; 1,620 long tons (1,646 t) full
- Length: 306 ft (93 m) o/a; 300 ft (91 m) w/l
- Beam: 36 ft 10 in (11.23 m)
- Draft: 11 ft 8 in (3.56 m)
- Propulsion: 4 × GM Mod. 16-278A diesel engines with electric drive, 6,000 shp (4,474 kW), 2 screws
- Speed: 21 knots (39 km/h; 24 mph)
- Range: 10,800 nmi (20,000 km) at 12 kn (22 km/h; 14 mph)
- Complement: 15 officers and 201 enlisted
- Armament: 3 × single Mk.22 3"/50 caliber guns; 1 × twin 40 mm Mk.1 AA gun; 8 × 20 mm Mk.4 AA guns; 3 × 21 inch (533 mm) torpedo tubes; 1 × Hedgehog Mk.10 anti-submarine mortar (144 rounds); 8 × Mk.6 depth charge projectors; 2 × Mk.9 depth charge tracks

USS Swearer (DE-186) was a Cannon-class destroyer escort in the United States Navy during World War II. She was later transferred to the French Navy as Bambara.

Swearer was laid down by the Federal Shipbuilding and Drydock Company of Newark, New Jersey on 12 August 1943, launched on 31 October 1943, and commissioned on 23 November 1943. Swearer was named after Lt. Walter John Swearer who was killed in action aboard USS Enterprise (CV-6) during the Battle of the Santa Cruz Islands in October 1942.

== History ==
=== World War II ===
==== 1944 ====
From commissioning until mid-January 1944, Swearer was attached to the Operational Training Command, Atlantic Fleet for shakedown training and post-shakedown availability. On 19 January 1944, she put to sea from New York City in the screen of a convoy of troop transports bound for the Panama Canal. She transited the canal at the end of January and continued on to Hawaii. Swearer arrived in Pearl Harbor on 15 February and remained there until the 29th, conducting training and undergoing repairs. On the 29th, she set sail for Eniwetok Atoll in the screen of a convoy and, after a stop at Kwajalein, reached her destination on 8 March.

For a little more than ten months, Swearer contributed to America's war effort in the Pacific by shepherding the logistics groups which supported the fighting. During the bulk of the time, she operated from Eniwetok and Ulithi atolls, screening the fueling group of the 3rd/5th fleets to and from fueling rendezvous. In being so engaged, the destroyer escort participated in the raids on Palau, Yap, Woleai, Truk, Sata-wan, and Ponape in March and April 1944.

In early April, she also screened escort carriers from Manus to resupply rendezvous with the larger carriers then engaged in operations in western New Guinea. After a month at Pearl Harbor in repairs, she returned to the central Pacific and to screening duty with the fueling group. She participated in the capture and occupation of the Mariana Islands between June and August, then moved south to Manus to screen escort carriers during the western Carolines and Leyte operations. In November, Swearer resumed duty with the fueling group. During these last three months with the fueling groups, she supported the fast carriers as they struck Luzon in the Philippines and as they made their sweep of Formosa, the China coast, and of the Nansei Shoto.

==== 1945 ====
After repairs and upkeep at Ulithi in the western Carolines, from 21 January to 6 February 1945, Swearer joined a convoy of cargo and troopships bound for the invasion of Iwo Jima. The convoy stopped at Guam for a week, then headed for Iwo Jima on 6 February. Swearer and her convoy arrived off the island on 19 February, the date of the assault. For five days, she patrolled the transport area and helped fight off Japanese air attacks, before departing on the 23rd for Leyte Gulf in the Philippines.

The destroyer escort remained in San Pedro Bay until 19 March, preparing for the invasion of Okinawa. Between the 19–26 March, she screened a convoy of cargo, troop, and amphibious warfare ships to the Okinawa staging area at Kerama Retto. Swearer remained in the vicinity of Okinawa for three months, patrolling, screening, escorting, and fighting off kamikaze attacks. She was attacked by a "Zeke" on the day of the invasion, but her gunners brought him down before he could crash her. On 16 April, a "Val" tried to crash-dive Swearer, but again her gunners brought him down. The destroyer escort continued to patrol Kerama Retto until 5 July. She suffered two more air attacks during that time, one by a bomber on 13 May and another by a torpedo bomber on 27 June. In both cases, however, neither plane nor ship inflicted damage upon the other.

For the duration of the war the Swearer was under the command of Captains John M. Trent and Kenneth H. Hannan. During her long tour of duty the Swearer received a total of 9 battle stars, 7 for the Philippine liberation and 2 for surviving without injury or damage following actions of aerial strafing, aerial torpedo, dive-bombing, two kamikaze attacks, and Typhoon Cobra.

Swearer returned to Eniwetok on 12 July, and headed for the United States on the following day. After a stop at Pearl Harbor, she entered San Diego on 27 July, and commenced overhaul. Three months later, she headed south to the Panama Canal, transited it on 4 November, and headed north to Norfolk, where she arrived on 10 November.

=== Decommissioning and transfer ===
On 25 February 1946, Swearer was placed out of commission and berthed at Green Cove Springs, Florida. She remained there until the spring of 1950, when she was moved to Philadelphia to repair for turnover to the Republic of France. On 16 September 1950, she joined the French Navy as Bambara (F-719), and her name was struck from the Naval Vessel Register on 20 October 1950. Bambara was stricken by the French Navy and broken up in 1959.

== See also ==
- List of Escorteurs of the French Navy
