= USS Snyder =

Cannon-class destroyer escort

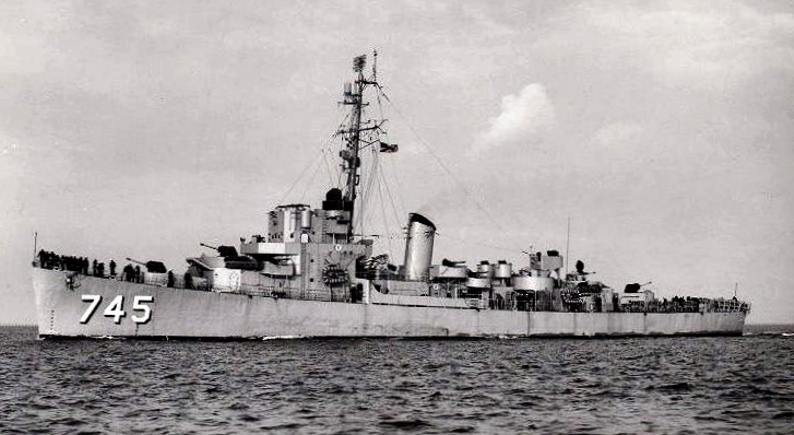

History
- Name: USS Snyder
- Namesake: Ensign Russell Snyder
- Builder: Western Pipe and Steel Company
- Laid down: 28 April 1943
- Launched: 29 August 1943
- Commissioned: 5 May 1944
- Decommissioned: 5 May 1960
- Stricken: 1 August 1972
- Honors and awards: 1 battle star (World War II)
- Fate: Scrapped, 1 November 1973

General characteristics
- Class & type: Cannon-class destroyer escort
- Displacement: 1,240 long tons (1,260 t) standard; 1,620 long tons (1,646 t) full
- Length: 306 ft (93 m) o/a; 300 ft (91 m) w/l
- Beam: 36 ft 10 in (11.23 m)
- Draft: 11 ft 8 in (3.56 m)
- Propulsion: 4 × GM Mod. 16-278A diesel engines with electric drive, 6,000 shp (4,474 kW), 2 screws
- Speed: 21 knots (39 km/h; 24 mph)
- Range: 10,800 nmi (20,000 km) at 12 kn (22 km/h; 14 mph)
- Complement: 15 officers and 201 enlisted
- Armament: 3 × single Mk.22 3-inch/50-caliber guns; 1 × twin 40 mm Mk.1 AA gun; 8 × 20 mm Mk.4 AA guns; 3 × 21 inch (533 mm) torpedo tubes; 1 × Hedgehog Mk.10 anti-submarine mortar (144 rounds); 8 × Mk.6 depth charge projectors; 2 × Mk.9 depth charge tracks

USS Snyder (DE-745) was a Cannon-class destroyer escort built for the United States Navy during World War II. She served in the Pacific Ocean and provided escort service against submarine and air attack for Navy vessels and convoys.

She was laid down on 28 April 1943 by the Western Pipe and Steel Company, San Pedro, Los Angeles; launched on 29 August 1943, sponsored by Mrs. Lillian J. Snyder; and commissioned on 5 May 1944.

== World War II Pacific Theatre operations ==
After undergoing shakedown in the San Diego area, Snyder sailed to San Francisco in early July. The destroyer escort joined Task Unit (TU) 16.1.5 there and departed for Pearl Harbor on 11 July. From 1 August to 6 October 1944, Snyder made escort tries to Enewetak Atoll, Manus Island, Saipan, and Kwajalein Atoll. She joined Task Group (TG) 12.3 and conducted hunter-killer operations on the San Francisco-Pearl Harbor-Eniwetok sea lanes until mid-February 1945.

Snyder's task group spent much of March searching for Lt. Gen. Millard Harmon, Commanding General of United States Army Air Forces, Pacific Ocean Areas, whose plane was lost at sea. She then resumed hunter-killer operations. In May, the escort joined a convoy en route from Saipan to Okinawa. On the 11th and 12th, she screened USS Hugh W. Hadley and USS Evans (DD-552), which had been damaged by kamikazes northwest of Okinawa, and escorted them to Ie Shima. The escort then joined the picket screen around Okinawa until 29 May. From 2 to 23 June, Snyder operated with Task Unit 31.1.1, composed of seven escort carriers, which provided air support for American forces fighting on southern Okinawa. In July and August, she performed anti-submarine patrols in the waters near Guam.

== Post-War operations ==
When hostilities with the Empire of Japan ceased, Snyder proceeded to Saipan. On 18 September, she screened a convoy of 21 transports from Saipan to Nagasaki. On 18 October, the ship sailed for the West Coast of the United States via Pearl Harbor. She was rerouted to the east coast for decommissioning and arrived at Norfolk, Virginia, in December 1945. She was then towed to Green Cove Springs, Florida where she lay with the reserve fleet until October 1946.

== Service as Training Ship ==
On 10 October, Snyder was towed to New York City and placed in commission, in reserve, as a training ship for the 3rd Naval District. She served in this capacity until May 1950, when she was placed in full commission for use in the Reserve Training Program. On 1 July 1957, Snyder was transferred to the Destroyer Force, Atlantic Fleet, but continued to operate as a Naval Reserve training ship.

== Final decommissioning ==
Snyder was again placed in reserve, out of commission, on 5 May 1960 and berthed at Philadelphia, Pennsylvania. She was struck from the Navy Directory on 1 August 1972 and sold to North American Smelting Co. in Wilmington, Delaware, for scrap.

== Awards ==
Snyder received one Asiatic–Pacific Campaign Medal with one star for World War II service.

== See also ==
- USS Slater
