= Cannon-class destroyer escort =

Class of American destroyer escorts

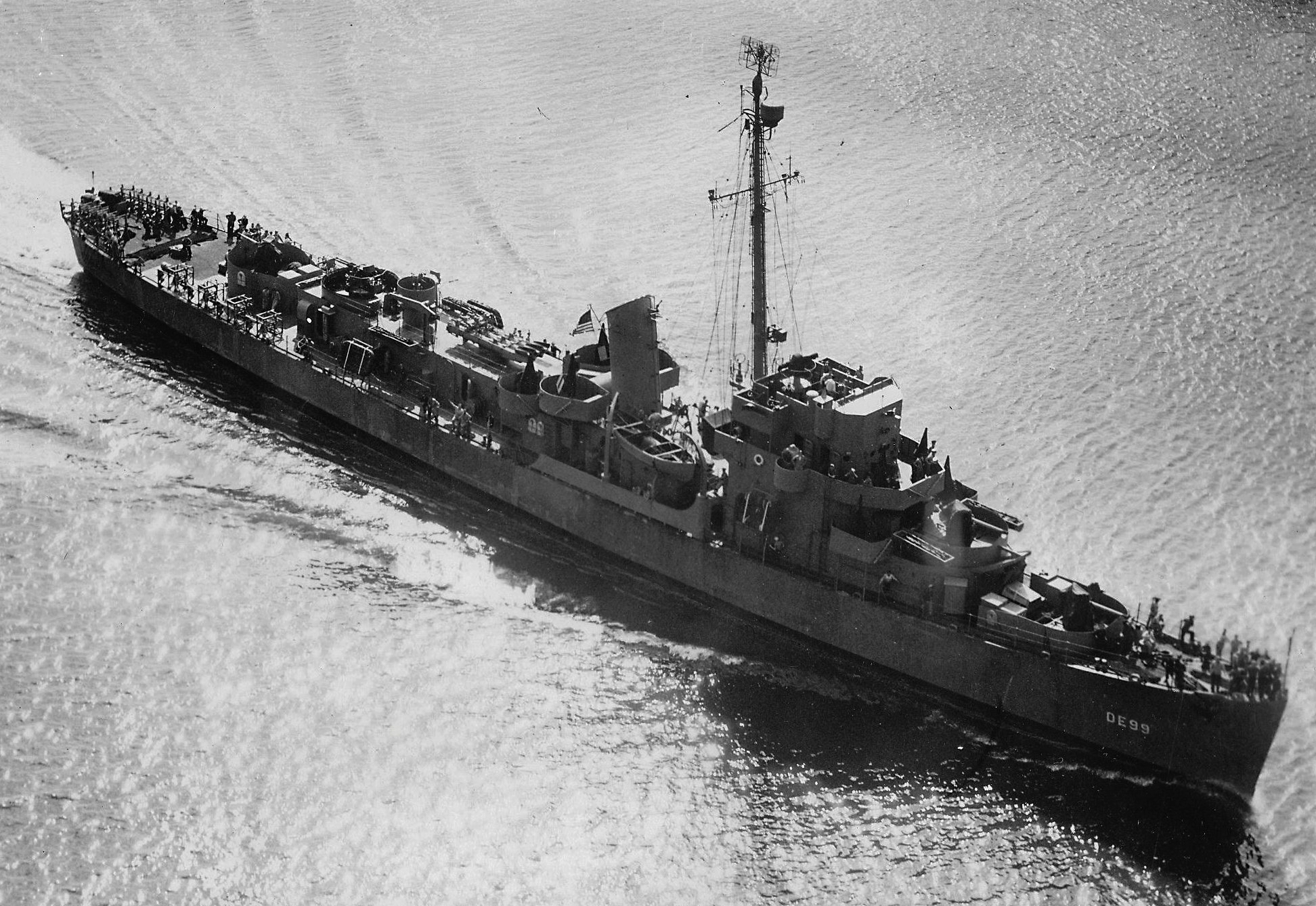
- USS Cannon (DE-99)

Class overview
- Name: Cannon class
- Builders: Dravo Corporation, DE; Federal Shipbuilding, NJ; Tampa Shipbuilding, FL; Western Pipe and Steel, CA
- Operators: World War II; United States Navy; Brazilian Navy; Free French Naval Forces; Post-War; United States Navy; French Navy; Hellenic Navy; Italian Navy; Japan Maritime Self-Defense Force; Royal Netherlands Navy; Peruvian Navy; Philippine Navy; Republic of China Navy; Republic of Korea Navy; Royal Thai Navy; National Navy of Uruguay
- Preceded by: Buckley class
- Succeeded by: Edsall class
- Subclasses: Aldebaran class; Asahi class; Van Amstel class
- In commission: 1943-2025
- Planned: 116
- Completed: 72
- Canceled: 44
- Preserved: 3

General characteristics
- Type: Destroyer Escort
- Displacement: 1,240 tons standard; 1,620 tons full load
- Length: 93.3 m (306 ft)
- Beam: 11 m (36 ft)
- Draft: 3.5 m (11 ft) full load
- Propulsion: 4 GM Mod. 16-278A diesel engines with electric drive; 6,000 shp (4,500 kW), 2 screws
- Speed: 21 knots (39 km/h)
- Range: 10,800 nautical miles (20,000 km; 12,400 mi) at 12 knots (22 km/h)
- Complement: 15 officers; 201 enlisted men
- Sensors & processing systems: Mark 63 fire-control system
- Armament: 3 × 3 in (76 mm)/50 guns (3×1); 2 × 40 mm Bofors AA guns (1x2); 8 × 20 mm Oerlikon AA guns (8×1); 3 × Torpedo tubes for 21-inch Mark 15 torpedo (1×3); 8 × depth charge projectors; 1 × Hedgehog anti-submarine mortar; 2 x depth charge tracks

The Cannon class was a class of destroyer escorts built by the United States primarily for antisubmarine warfare and convoy escort service during World War II. The lead ship, USS Cannon, was commissioned on 26 September 1943 at Wilmington, Delaware. Of the 116 ships ordered, 44 were cancelled and six were commissioned directly into the Free French Forces. Destroyer escorts were regular companions escorting vulnerable cargo ships.

HTMS Pin Klao (DE-413) was the last ship of the class to retire from active service after she was decommissioned from the Royal Thai Navy on 10 September 2025.

== Propulsion ==
The class was also known as the DET type from their diesel electric tandem drives. The propulsion system of the Evarts-class (GMT = General Motors Tandem) was identical. The DET's substitution for a turboelectric propulsion plant was the primary difference with the predecessor Buckley ("TE") class. The DET was, in turn, replaced with a direct-drive diesel plant to yield the design of the successor Edsall ("FMR") class.

== Hull numbers ==
A total of 72 ships of the Cannon class were built.

- DE-99 through DE-113 (six are French)
- DE-162 through DE-197
- DE-739 through DE-750
- DE-763 through DE-771

== Wartime transfers ==
During World War II, six ships of the class were earmarked for the Free French Naval Forces and a further eight were transferred the Brazilian Navy.

=== Free French ships ===
- USS Corbesier (DE-106) as Sénégalais
- USS Cronin (DE-107) as Algérien
- USS Crosley (DE-108) as Tunisien
- USS Marocain (DE-109) as Marocain
- USS Hova (DE-110) as Hova
- USS Somali (DE-111) as Somali

=== Transferred to Brazil ===
- USS Alger (DE-101) as Babitonga
- USS Cannon (DE-99) as Baependi
- USS Christopher (DE-100) as Benevente
- USS Herzog (DE-178) as Beberibe
- USS Marts (DE-174) as Bocaina
- USS McAnn (DE-179) as Bauru - now a museum ship in Rio de Janeiro
- USS Pennewill (DE-175) as Bertioga
- USS Reybold (DE-177) as Bracui

== Postwar dispersal ==
After the end of World War II, the United States Navy transferred many ships of the Cannon class to other navies.

=== Transferred to France ===
- USS Baker (DE-190) as Malgache (F724); served 1952–1969
- USS Bright (DE-747) as Touareg (F721); served 1950–1960
- USS Cates (DE-763) as Soudanais (F722); served 1950–1959
- USS Clarence L. Evans (DE-113) as Berbère (F723); served 1952–1960
- USS Riddle (DE-185) as Kabyle (F718); served 1950–1959
- USS Samuel S. Miles (DE-183) as Arabe (F717); served 1950–1968
- USS Swearer (DE-186) as Bambara (F719); served 1950–1959
- USS Wingfield (DE-194) as Sakalave (F720); served 1950–1960

=== Transferred to Greece ===
- USS Eldridge (DE-173) as Leon; served 1951–1992
- USS Slater (DE-766) as Aetos; served 1951–1991; now a museum ship in Albany, New York, the only destroyer escort afloat in the United States
- USS Ebert (DE-768) as Ierax ; served 1951–1991
- USS Garfield Thomas (DE-193) as Panthir; served 1951–1992

=== Transferred to Italy ===
- USS Wesson (DE-184) as Andromeda (F 592) 1951; scrapped in 1972
- USS Thornhill (DE-195) as Aldebaran (F 590) 1951; scrapped in 1976
- USS Gandy (DE-764) as Altair (F 591) 1951; stricken and sunk as target in 1971

=== Transferred to Japan ===
- USS Amick (DE-168) as Asahi (DE-262) 1955–75 (then to the Philippines)
- USS Atherton (DE-169) as Hatsuhi (DE-263) 1955–75 (then to the Philippines)

=== Transferred to the Netherlands ===
- USS Burrows (DE-105) as Van Amstel (F806) 1950
- USS Rinehart (DE-196) as Bitter (F807) 1950
- USS Gustafson (DE-182) as Van Ewijck (F808) 1950
- USS O'Neill (DE-188) as Dubois (F809) 1950
- USS Eisner (DE-192) as Zeeuw (F810) 1950
- USS Stern (DE-187) as van Zijll (F811) 1950

=== Transferred to Peru ===
- USS Bangust (DE-739) as BAP Castilla; served 1951–1979
- USS Waterman (DE-740) as BAP Aguirre; served 1951–1974
- USS Weaver (DE-741) as BAP Rodríguez; served 1951–1979

=== Transferred to the Philippines ===
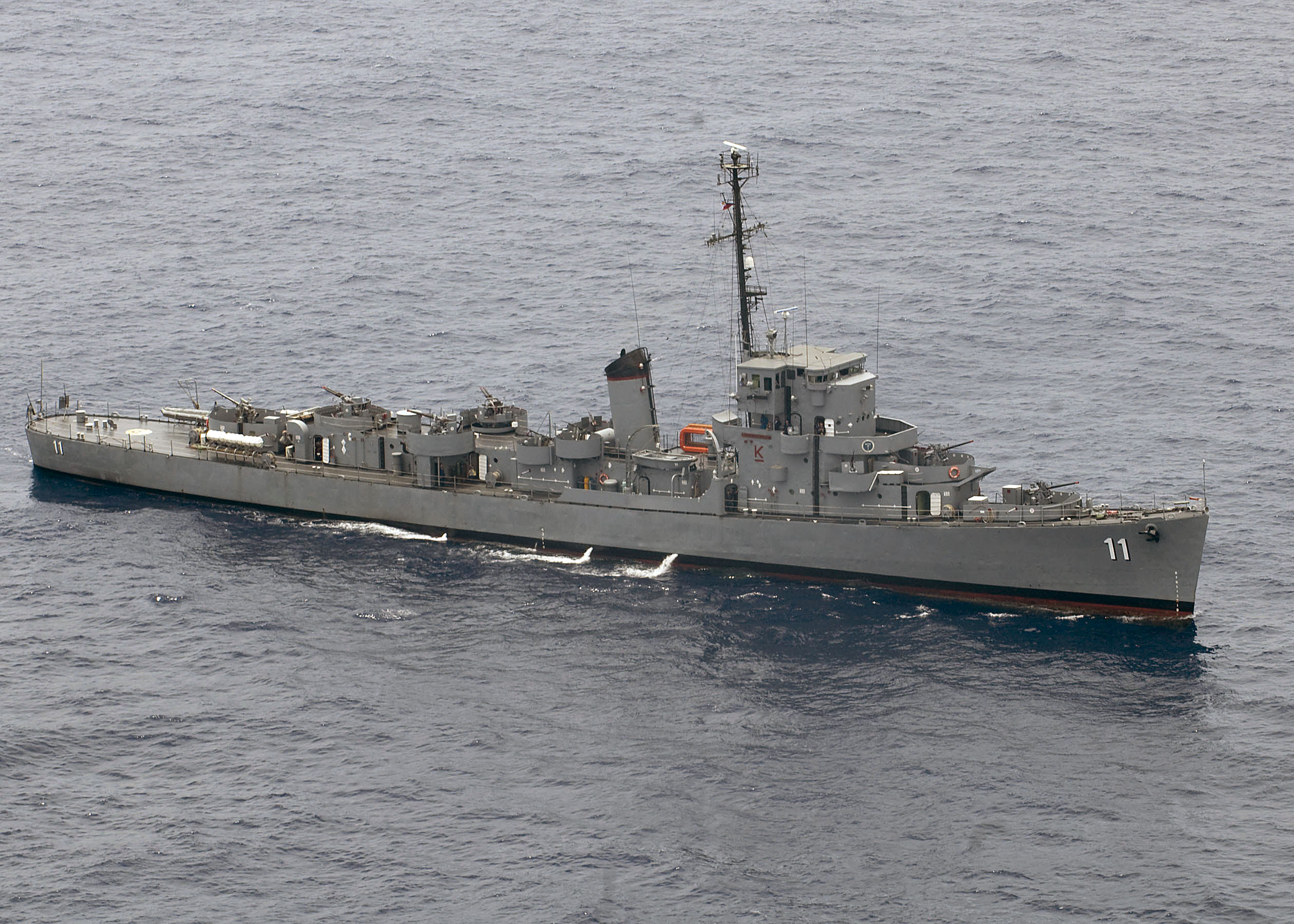
BRP Rajah Humabon (PF-11) of the Philippine Navy

- USS Amick (DE-168) as BRP Datu Sikatuna (PF-5); scrapped in 1989
- USS Atherton (DE-169) as BRP Rajah Humabon (PF-11); retired in 2018; possibly scrapped after capsizing in a typhoon in 2022
- USS Booth (DE-170) as BRP Datu Kalantiaw (PS-76); sunk during a typhoon in 1981
- USS Muir (DE-770)—cannibalized for parts
- USS Sutton (DE-771)—cannibalized for parts

=== Transferred to South Korea ===
- USS Muir (DE-770) as ROKN Kyong Ki (F-71); served 1956–1977 (then to the Philippines)
- USS Sutton (DE-771) as ROKN Kang Won (F-72); served 1956–1977 (then to the Philippines)

=== Transferred to the Republic of China (Taiwan) ===
- USS Thomas (DE-102) as ROCN Taihe (太和)
- USS Bostwick (DE-103) as ROCN Taicang (太倉)
- USS Breeman (DE-104) as ROCN Taihu (太湖)
- USS Carter (DE-112) as ROCN Taizhao (太昭)

=== Transferred to Thailand ===
- USS Hemminger (DE-746) as HTMS Pin Klao (DE-413); served 1959–2025

=== Transferred to Uruguay ===
- USS Baron (DE-166) as Uruguay (DE-1); served 1952–1990
- USS Bronstein (DE-189) as Artigas (DE-2); served 1952–1988

== Ships in class ==
Construction data
Ship name	Hull no.	Builder	Laid down	Launched	Commissioned	Decommissioned	Fate
Cannon	DE-99	Dravo Corporation, Wilmington, Delaware	14 November 1942	25 May 1943	26 September 1943	19 December 1944	to Brazil 19 December 1944 as Baependi; scrapped 1975
Christopher	DE-100	Dravo Corporation, Wilmington, Delaware	7 December 1942	19 June 1943	23 October 1943	19 December 1944	to Brazil 19 December 1944 as Benevente; scrapped 1964
Alger	DE-101	Dravo Corporation, Wilmington, Delaware	2 January 1943	8 July 1943	12 November 1943	10 March 1945	to Brazil 10 March 1945 as Babitonga; scrapped 1964
Thomas	DE-102	Dravo Corporation, Wilmington, Delaware	16 January 1943	31 July 1943	21 November 1943	13 March 1946	Completed at Norfolk Navy Yard. To Taiwan as Taihe (DE-23) 29 October 1948; scrapped 1972
Bostwick	DE-103	Dravo Corporation, Wilmington, Delaware	6 February 1943	30 August 1943	1 December 1943	30 April 1946	to Taiwan as Taicang (DE-25) 14 December 1948; scrapped 1972
Breeman	DE-104	Dravo Corporation, Wilmington, Delaware	20 March 1943	4 September 1943	12 December 1943	26 April 1946	Completed at Norfolk Navy Yard. To Taiwan as Taihu (DE-24) 29 October 1948; scrapped 1972
Burrows	DE-105	Dravo Corporation, Wilmington, Delaware	24 March 1943	2 October 1943	19 December 1943	14 June 1946	to the Netherlands as Van Amstel (F806) 1 June 1950; scrapped 1968
Carter	DE-112	Dravo Corporation, Wilmington, Delaware	19 November 1943	29 February 1944	3 May 1944	10 April 1946	to Taiwan Taizhao (DE-26) 14 December 1948; scrapped 1973
Clarence L. Evans	DE-113	Dravo Corporation, Wilmington, Delaware	23 December 1943	22 March 1944	25 June 1944	29 May 1947	Transferred to France as Berbère (F723) 29 March 1952; scrapped 1960
Levy	DE-162	Federal Shipbuilding and Drydock Company, Port Newark, New Jersey	19 October 1942	28 March 1943	13 May 1943	4 April 1947	Struck from Navy List 2 August 1973, sold for scrap 17 July 1974
McConnell	DE-163	Federal Shipbuilding and Drydock Company, Port Newark, New Jersey	19 October 1942	28 March 1943	28 May 1943	29 June 1946	Struck from Navy List 1 October 1972, sold for scrap 21 March 1974
Osterhaus	DE-164	Federal Shipbuilding and Drydock Company, Port Newark, New Jersey	11 November 1942	18 April 1943	12 June 1943	26 June 1946	Struck from Navy List 1 November 1972, sold for scrap 30 May 1974
Parks	DE-165	Federal Shipbuilding and Drydock Company, Port Newark, New Jersey	11 November 1942	18 April 1943	22 June 1943	March 1946	Struck from Navy List 1 July 1972, sold for scrap 15 October 1973
Baron	DE-166	Federal Shipbuilding and Drydock Company, Port Newark, New Jersey	30 November 1942	9 May 1943	5 July 1943	26 April 1946	to Uruguay as Uruguay (DE-1) 3 May 1952; scrapped 1990
Acree	DE-167	Federal Shipbuilding and Drydock Company, Port Newark, New Jersey	30 November 1942	9 May 1943	19 July 1943	1 April 1946	Struck from Navy List 1 July 1972, sold for scrap 19 July 1973
Amick	DE-168	Federal Shipbuilding and Drydock Company, Port Newark, New Jersey	30 November 1942	27 May 1943	26 July 1943	16 May 1947	to Japan as Asahi (DE-262) 14 June 1955; returned 1975. Transferred to the Philippines as Datu Sikatuna (PF-5); scrapped 1989
Atherton	DE-169	Federal Shipbuilding and Drydock Company, Port Newark, New Jersey	14 January 1943	27 May 1943	29 August 1943	10 December 1945	to Japan as Hatsuhi (DE-263) 14 June 1955; returned 1975. Transferred to the Philippines as Rajah Humabon (PF-11); retired in 2018; possibly scrapped after capsizing in a typhoon in 2022
Booth	DE-170	Federal Shipbuilding and Drydock Company, Port Newark, New Jersey	30 January 1943	21 June 1943	19 September 1943	14 June 1946	to the Philippines as Datu Kalantiaw (PF-76/FF-170) 15 December 1967. Lost during Typhoon Clara 21 September 1981
Carroll	DE-171	Federal Shipbuilding and Drydock Company, Port Newark, New Jersey	30 January 1943	21 June 1943	24 October 1943	19 June 1946	Struck from Navy List 1 August 1965, sold for scrap 29 December 1966
Cooner	DE-172	Federal Shipbuilding and Drydock Company, Port Newark, New Jersey	22 February 1943	25 July 1943	21 August 1943	25 June 1946	Struck from Navy List 1 July 1972, sold for scrap 1 November 1973
Eldridge	DE-173	Federal Shipbuilding and Drydock Company, Port Newark, New Jersey	22 February 1943	25 July 1943	27 August 1943	17 June 1946	to Greece 15 January 1951, renamed Leon (D-54); scrapped 1999
Marts	DE-174	Federal Shipbuilding and Drydock Company, Port Newark, New Jersey	26 April 1943	8 August 1943	3 September 1943	20 March 1945	to Brazil 20 March 1945 as Bocaina (D-22); scrapped 1975
Pennewill	DE-175	Federal Shipbuilding and Drydock Company, Port Newark, New Jersey	26 April 1943	8 August 1943	15 September 1943	1 August 1944	to Brazil 1 August 1944 as Bertioga (D-21); scrapped 1975
Micka	DE-176	Federal Shipbuilding and Drydock Company, Port Newark, New Jersey	3 May 1943	22 August 1943	23 September 1943	14 June 1946	Struck from Navy List 1 August 1965, sold for scrap 15 May 1967
Reybold	DE-177	Federal Shipbuilding and Drydock Company, Port Newark, New Jersey	3 May 1943	22 August 1943	29 September 1943	15 August 1944	to Brazil 15 August 1944 as Bracui (D-18); scrapped 1972
Herzog	DE-178	Federal Shipbuilding and Drydock Company, Port Newark, New Jersey	17 May 1943	5 September 1943	6 October 1943	1 August 1944	to Brazil 1 August 1944 as Beberibe (D-23); scrapped 1968
McAnn	DE-179	Federal Shipbuilding and Drydock Company, Port Newark, New Jersey	17 May 1943	5 September 1943	11 October 1943	15 August 1944	to Brazil 15 August 1944 as Bauru; museum ship in Rio de Janeiro
Trumpeter	DE-180	Federal Shipbuilding and Drydock Company, Port Newark, New Jersey	7 June 1943	19 September 1943	16 October 1943	5 December 1947	Struck from Navy List 1 August 1973, sold for scrap 18 June 1974
Straub	DE-181	Federal Shipbuilding and Drydock Company, Port Newark, New Jersey	7 June 1943	19 September 1943	25 October 1943	17 October 1947	Struck from Navy List 1 August 1973, sold for scrap 17 July 1974
Gustafson	DE-182	Federal Shipbuilding and Drydock Company, Port Newark, New Jersey	5 July 1943	3 October 1943	1 November 1943	26 June 1946	to the Netherlands as Van Ewijk (F808) 23 October 1950; scrapped 1968
Samuel S. Miles (ex-Miles)	DE-183	Federal Shipbuilding and Drydock Company, Port Newark, New Jersey	5 July 1943	3 October 1943	4 November 1943	28 March 1946	to France as Arabe (F717) 12 August 1950; scrapped 1968
Wesson	DE-184	Federal Shipbuilding and Drydock Company, Port Newark, New Jersey	29 July 1943	17 October 1943	11 November 1943	25 July 1946	to Italy as Andromeda (F592) 10 January 1951; scrapped 1972
Riddle	DE-185	Federal Shipbuilding and Drydock Company, Port Newark, New Jersey	29 July 1943	17 October 1943	17 November 1943	8 June 1946	to France as Kabyle (F718) 12 August 1950; scrapped 1959
Swearer	DE-186	Federal Shipbuilding and Drydock Company, Port Newark, New Jersey	12 August 1943	31 October 1943	24 November 1943	25 February 1946	to France as Bambara (F719) 16 September 1950; scrapped 1959
Stern	DE-187	Federal Shipbuilding and Drydock Company, Port Newark, New Jersey	12 August 1943	31 October 1943	1 December 1943	16 April 1946	to the Netherlands as Van Zijll (F811) 1 March 1951; scrapped 1968
O'Neill	DE-188	Federal Shipbuilding and Drydock Company, Port Newark, New Jersey	26 August 1943	14 November 1943	6 December 1943	2 May 1946	to the Netherlands as Du Bois (F809) 23 October 1950; scrapped 1968
Bronstein	DE-189	Federal Shipbuilding and Drydock Company, Port Newark, New Jersey	26 August 1943	14 November 1943	13 December 1943	5 November 1945	to Uruguay as Artigas (DE-2) 3 May 1952; scrapped 1988
Baker (ex-Raby)	DE-190	Federal Shipbuilding and Drydock Company, Port Newark, New Jersey	9 September 1943	28 November 1943	23 December 1943	4 March 1946	to France as Malgache (F724) 29 March 1952; sunk as target 1970
Coffman	DE-191	Federal Shipbuilding and Drydock Company, Port Newark, New Jersey	9 September 1943	28 November 1943	27 December 1943	30 April 1946	Struck from Navy List 1 July 1972, sold for scrap 17 August 1973
Eisner	DE-192	Federal Shipbuilding and Drydock Company, Port Newark, New Jersey	23 September 1943	12 December 1943	1 January 1944	15 July 1946	to the Netherlands as De Zeeuw (F810) 1 March 1951; scrapped 1968
Garfield Thomas (ex–William G. Thomas)	DE-193	Federal Shipbuilding and Drydock Company, Port Newark, New Jersey	23 September 1943	12 December 1943	24 January 1944	27 March 1947	to Greece as Panthir (D-67) 15 January 1951; out of service 1991, scrapped
Wingfield	DE-194	Federal Shipbuilding and Drydock Company, Port Newark, New Jersey	7 October 1943	30 December 1943	28 January 1944	26 August 1947	to France as Sakalave (F720) 15 September 1950; scrapped 1960
Thornhill	DE-195	Federal Shipbuilding and Drydock Company, Port Newark, New Jersey	7 October 1943	30 December 1943	1 February 1944	17 June 1947	to Italy as Aldebaran (F590) 10 January 1951; scrapped 1976
Rinehart	DE-196	Federal Shipbuilding and Drydock Company, Port Newark, New Jersey	21 October 1943	9 January 1944	12 February 1944	17 July 1946	to the Netherlands as De Bitter (F807) 1 June 1950; scrapped 1968
Roche	DE-197	Federal Shipbuilding and Drydock Company, Port Newark, New Jersey	21 October 1943	9 January 1944	21 February 1944	—N/a	Damaged by sea mine northwest of Eniwetok 22 August 1945; not repaired and sunk off Yokosuka 11 March 1946.
Bangust	DE-739	Western Pipe and Steel Company, San Pedro, California	11 February 1943	6 June 1943	30 October 1943	17 November 1946	Transferred to Peru as Castilla (F-61) 21 February 1952; scrapped 1979
Waterman	DE-740	Western Pipe and Steel Company, San Pedro, California	24 February 1943	20 June 1943	30 November 1943	31 May 1946	to Peru as Aguirre (DE-62) 21 February 1952; sunk as target 1974
Weaver	DE-741	Western Pipe and Steel Company, San Pedro, California	13 March 1943	4 July 1943	31 December 1943	29 May 1947	to Peru as Rodriguez 21 February 1952; scrapped 1979
Hilbert	DE-742	Western Pipe and Steel Company, San Pedro, California	23 March 1943	18 July 1943	4 February 1944	19 June 1946	Struck from Navy List 1 August 1972, sold for scrap 15 October 1973
Lamons	DE-743	Western Pipe and Steel Company, San Pedro, California	10 April 1943	1 August 1943	29 February 1944	14 June 1946	Struck from Navy List 1 August 1972, sold for scrap 15 October 1973
Kyne	DE-744	Western Pipe and Steel Company, San Pedro, California	16 April 1943	15 August 1943	4 April 1944	14 June 1946	Struck from Navy List 1 August 1972, sold for scrap 1 November 1973
Kyne	DE-744	Western Pipe and Steel Company, San Pedro, California	16 April 1943	15 August 1943	21 November 1950	17 June 1960	Struck from Navy List 1 August 1972, sold for scrap 1 November 1973
Snyder	DE-745	Western Pipe and Steel Company, San Pedro, California	28 April 1943	29 August 1943	5 May 1944	5 May 1960	Struck from Navy List 1 August 1972, sold for scrap 1 November 1973
Hemminger	DE-746	Western Pipe and Steel Company, San Pedro, California	5 May 1943	12 September 1943	30 May 1944	17 June 1946	Transferred to Thailand as Pin Klao (DE-1) 22 July 1959; retired in 2025.
Hemminger	DE-746	Western Pipe and Steel Company, San Pedro, California	5 May 1943	12 September 1943	1 December 1950	21 February 1958	Transferred to Thailand as Pin Klao (DE-1) 22 July 1959; retired in 2025.
Bright	DE-747	Western Pipe and Steel Company, San Pedro, California	9 June 1943	26 September 1943	30 June 1944	19 April 1946	Transferred to France as Touareg (F721) 11 November 1950; scrapped 1965
Tills	DE-748	Western Pipe and Steel Company, San Pedro, California	23 June 1943	3 October 1943	8 August 1944	14 June 1946	Struck from Navy List 23 September 1968. Sunk as target on 3 April 1969
Tills	DE-748	Western Pipe and Steel Company, San Pedro, California	23 June 1943	3 October 1943	21 November 1950	18 October 1959	Struck from Navy List 23 September 1968. Sunk as target on 3 April 1969
Tills	DE-748	Western Pipe and Steel Company, San Pedro, California	23 June 1943	3 October 1943	1 October 1961	23 September 1968	Struck from Navy List 23 September 1968. Sunk as target on 3 April 1969
Roberts	DE-749	Western Pipe and Steel Company, San Pedro, California	7 July 1943	14 November 1943	2 September 1944	21 September 1968	Struck from Navy List 23 September 1968, sunk as target in November 1971
McClelland	DE-750	Western Pipe and Steel Company, San Pedro, California	21 July 1943	28 November 1943	19 September 1944	15 May 1946	Struck from Navy List 1 August 1972, sold for scrap 1 November 1973
McClelland	DE-750	Western Pipe and Steel Company, San Pedro, California	21 July 1943	28 November 1943	14 July 1950	12 September 1960	Struck from Navy List 1 August 1972, sold for scrap 1 November 1973
Cates	DE-763	Tampa Shipbuilding Company, Tampa, Florida	1 March 1943	10 October 1943	15 December 1943	28 March 1947	to France as Soudanais (F722) 11 November 1950; scrapped 1959
Gandy	DE-764	Tampa Shipbuilding Company, Tampa, Florida	1 March 1943	12 December 1943	7 February 1944	17 June 1946	to Italy as Altair (F591) 10 January 1951; sunk as target 1971
Earl K. Olsen	DE-765	Tampa Shipbuilding Company, Tampa, Florida	9 March 1943	13 February 1944	10 April 1944	17 June 1946	Struck from Navy List 1 August 1972, sold for scrap 15 October 1973
Earl K. Olsen	DE-765	Tampa Shipbuilding Company, Tampa, Florida	9 March 1943	13 February 1944	21 November 1950	25 February 1958	Struck from Navy List 1 August 1972, sold for scrap 15 October 1973
Slater	DE-766	Tampa Shipbuilding Company, Tampa, Florida	9 March 1943	13 February 1944	1 May 1944	26 September 1947	to Greece as Aetos (D-01) 1 March 1951; retired 1991. Since 1993 museum ship in Albany, New York
Oswald	DE-767	Tampa Shipbuilding Company, Tampa, Florida	1 April 1943	25 April 1944	12 June 1944	30 April 1946	Struck from Navy List 1 August 1972, sold for scrap 15 October 1973
Ebert	DE-768	Tampa Shipbuilding Company, Tampa, Florida	1 April 1943	11 May 1944	12 July 1944	14 June 1946	to Greece as Ierax (D-31) 1 March 1951; sunk as target 2002
Neal A. Scott	DE-769	Tampa Shipbuilding Company, Tampa, Florida	1 June 1943	4 June 1944	31 July 1944	30 April 1946	Struck from Navy List 1 June 1968, sold for scrap in July 1969
Muir	DE-770	Tampa Shipbuilding Company, Tampa, Florida	1 June 1943	4 June 1944	30 August 1944	September 1947	to South Korean as Kyongki (F-71) 2 February 1956; to the Philippines for spare parts 1977
Sutton	DE-771	Tampa Shipbuilding Company, Tampa, Florida	23 August 1943	6 August 1944	22 December 1944	19 March 1948	to South Korean as Kang Won (F-72) 2 February 1956; to the Philippines for spare parts 1977

== See also ==
- List of Escorteurs of the French Navy
- List of ship classes of the Second World War
- List of naval ship classes in service
