= USS Bright =

Cannon-class destroyer escort

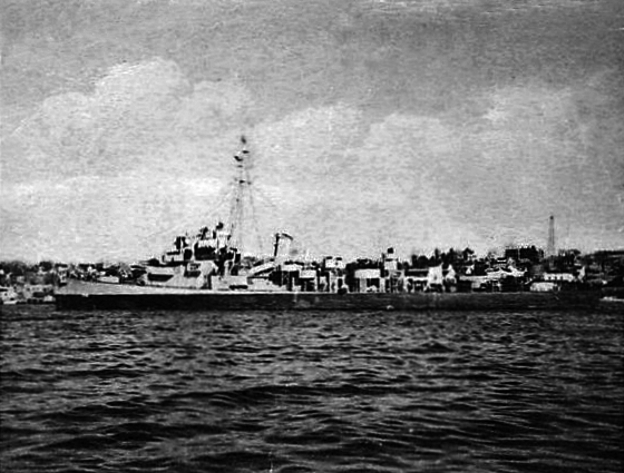

History

United States
- Name: USS Bright (DE-747)
- Namesake: Lt.(jg.) Graham Paul Bright
- Builder: Western Pipe and Steel Company, Los Angeles, California
- Laid down: 9 June 1943
- Launched: 26 September 1943
- Commissioned: 30 June 1944
- Decommissioned: 19 April 1946
- Stricken: 20 December 1950
- Honors and awards: 1 battle star (World War II)
- Fate: Transferred to France, 11 November 1950

History

France
- Name: Touareg (F721)
- Namesake: Tuareg people
- Acquired: 11 November 1950
- Decommissioned: 1960
- Stricken: May 1964
- Fate: Sold for scrapping, May 1965

General characteristics
- Class & type: Cannon-class destroyer escort
- Displacement: 1,240 long tons (1,260 t) standard; 1,620 long tons (1,646 t) full
- Length: 306 ft (93 m) o/a; 300 ft (91 m) w/l
- Beam: 36 ft 10 in (11.23 m)
- Draft: 11 ft 8 in (3.56 m)
- Propulsion: 4 × GM Mod. 16-278A diesel engines with electric drive, 6,000 shp (4,474 kW), 2 screws
- Speed: 21 knots (39 km/h; 24 mph)
- Range: 10,800 nmi (20,000 km) at 12 kn (22 km/h; 14 mph)
- Complement: 15 officers and 201 enlisted
- Armament: 3 × single Mk.22 3"/50 caliber guns; 1 × twin 40 mm Mk.1 AA gun; 8 × 20 mm Mk.4 AA guns; 3 × 21 inch (533 mm) torpedo tubes; 1 × Hedgehog Mk.10 anti-submarine mortar (144 rounds); 8 × Mk.6 depth charge projectors; 2 × Mk.9 depth charge tracks

USS Bright (DE-747) was a Cannon-class destroyer escort in service with the United States Navy from 1944 to 1946. In 1950, she was transferred to France, where she served as Touareg (F721) until 1960. She was scrapped in 1965.

== First commission and WWII service 1941-1945 ==
She was named in honor of Graham Paul Bright who was killed on Guam by Japanese machine gun fire during the fighting that followed the Japanese landing on 10 December 1941. The ship was laid down on 9 June 1943 at San Pedro, California, by the Western Pipe and Steel Company; launched on 26 September 1943; sponsored by Mrs. Miriam Engle Bright, Lt.(jg.) Bright's widow; and commissioned on 30 June 1944.

=== Hawaii and Marshall Islands ===
Standing out San Diego, California, on 19 September with SS John B. Floyd, Bright escorted her to Hawaii and then carried out training in the Hawaiian operating area well into November. Assigned to Task Group (TG) 12.3, the destroyer escort took part in a series of six hunter-killer operations out of the Hawaiian and Marshall Islands between 24 November 1944 and 23 April 1945. During those cruises, she conducted depth charge attacks on three sound contacts, but obtained no evidence of success.

=== Mariannas, Saipan ===
A week after her last hunter-killer cruise on 30 April 1945, Bright sailed from Eniwetok for Saipan, where she reported to the Commander, Task Force (TF) 51 for duty in the Escort Pool. On 5 May, as an element of an escort group, she cleared Saipan with Convoy SOK-1, bound for Okinawa.

=== Passage to Okinawa, kamikaze hit ===
Two incidents highlighted the otherwise uneventful passage. On 9 May, Bright picked up a sonar contact and made two unsuccessful depth charge attacks. The second attack, though, was soon followed by a torpedo wake approaching her on the port quarter. Bright maneuvered to avoid the "fish," and it passed 20 feet from her bow. The following day, she sank a mine with rifle fire and arrived at her destination without further incident.

The destroyer escort took station in the transports' anti-submarine screen on 11 May and was so engaged on the 13th when she took a low-flying Mitsubishi A6M5 "Zeke" under fire at 1919, scoring hits on the plane's engine and port wing. Although her gunfire sheared off the "Zeke's" port wing, the Japanese pilot continued his suicide approach and crashed on Bright's fantail. The plane's bomb exploded upon impact, and the warship immediately lost steering control with her rudder jammed in a hard left turn. With her after engine room completely demolished, both port and starboard depth charge tracks inoperative, her smoke generators pierced, the main deck buckled and pierced, and three compartments of her hull opened to the sea, Bright circled for the next hour. Still full of fight, however, she teamed up with nearby Barr (APD-39) just minutes after that attack to open up on another "bogey" and splashed him.

=== Repair, decommissioning ===
Towed to Kerama Retto for emergency repairs, Bright got underway in convoy on 22 May and, proceeding via Ulithi and Eniwetok, arrived at Pearl Harbor on 14 June. Heading thence to Portland, Oregon, the destroyer escort underwent extensive repairs and alterations between 23 June and 8 September. The war ended while she was in the yard, and so Bright received orders to steam via the Panama Canal to the Atlantic. She arrived at Charleston, South Carolina, on 25 September 1945 but, soon thereafter, moved to Green Cove Springs near Jacksonville, Florida. She was decommissioned and placed in reserve there on 19 April 1946.

== French Navy (1950-1965) ==
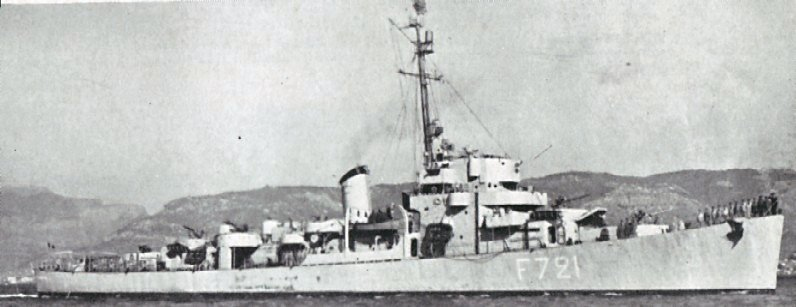
Bright as Touareg (F721).

Reactivated on 18 March 1950 for transfer to France under the Mutual Defense Assistance Pact (MDAP), Bright was turned over to the French at the Philadelphia Naval Shipyard on 11 November 1950. Her name was struck from the Navy List on 20 December 1950. Renamed Touareg (F721), she served the French Navy until placed in reserve in 1960. In May 1964, the French struck her name from their Navy List and then sold her for scrapping in May 1965 to the Compagnie Métallurgique et Minière, of Paris.

== Awards ==
Bright earned one battle star for her World War II service.

== See also ==
- List of Escorteurs of the French Navy
