= USS Christopher =

Cannon-class destroyer escort

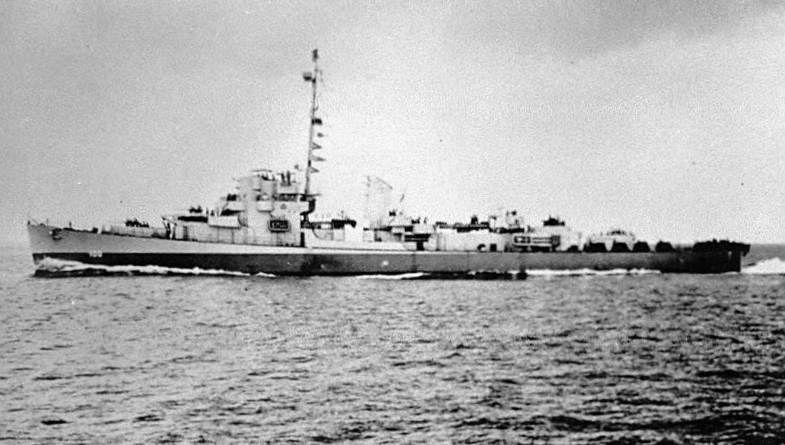

History

United States
- Namesake: Harold Jensen Christopher
- Builder: Dravo Corporation, Wilmington, Delaware
- Laid down: 7 December 1942
- Launched: 19 June 1943
- Commissioned: 23 October 1943
- Decommissioned: 19 December 1944
- Stricken: 20 July 1953
- Fate: Transferred to Brazil, 19 December 1944

Brazil
- Name: NAe Benevente (D-20)
- Acquired: 19 December 1944
- Out of service: 1964

General characteristics
- Class & type: Cannon-class destroyer escort
- Displacement: 1,240 tons
- Length: 306 ft (93 m)
- Beam: 36 ft 8 in (11.2 m)
- Draft: 8 ft 9 in (2.7 m)
- Propulsion: 4 GM Mod. 16-278A diesel engines with electric drive; 6,000 shp (4,500 kW), 2 screws
- Speed: 21 knots (39 km/h; 24 mph)
- Range: 10,800 nmi. at 12 knots
- Complement: 15 officers, 201 enlisted
- Armament: 3 × 3 in (76 mm)/50 guns (3×1); 2 × 40 mm Bofors AA guns (1x2); 8 × 20 mm Oerlikon AA guns (8×1); 3 × Torpedo tubes for 21-inch Mark 15 torpedo (1×3); 8 × depth charge projectors; 1 × Hedgehog anti-submarine mortar; 2 x depth charge tracks

USS Christopher (DE-100) was a Cannon class destroyer escort built for the United States Navy. She served only a short time in the Atlantic Ocean before being transferred to Brazil, in December 1944. She was renamed NAe Benevente (D-20) and was finally retired and scrapped in 1964.

== History ==
USS Christopher was named for a Navy Cross recipient, Harold Jensen Christopher, who was killed at Pearl Harbor aboard USS Nevada (BB-36) on 7 December 1941.

She was launched 19 June 1943 by Dravo Corp., Wilmington, Delaware; sponsored by Mrs. Carl Christopher, mother of Ensign Christopher. D100 commissioned 23 October 1943.

=== U.S. Navy (1943-1944) ===
Christopher sailed from Philadelphia, Pennsylvania, 25 December 1943 for duty off Brazil and to Trinidad on training exercises in convoys and on screening cruisers during their shakedown and training periods. Between 16 January and 11 February, she sailed off Montevideo, screening the British cable ship Cambria as she repaired broken cables.

=== Brazilian Navy (1944-1964) ===
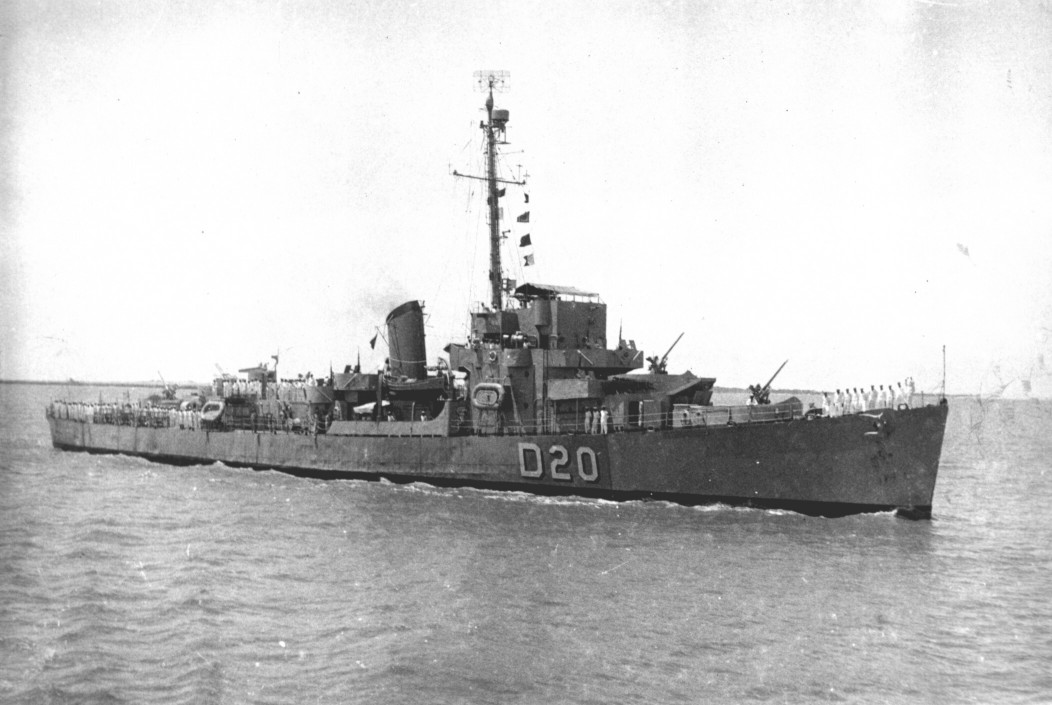
Christopher as Benevente (D-20) in Brazilian service.

Similar duty continued until Christopher was decommissioned at Natal, Brazil, 19 December 1944, and loaned to Brazil under lend-lease. She was renamed Benevente (D-20) in Brazilian service. On 30 June 1953, when the loan ended, she was stricken from the U.S Navy List and transferred to Brazil under the Mutual Assistance Program.

She was stricken and scrapped in 1964.

== Awards ==

American Campaign Medal	World War II Victory Medal
