= USS Reybold =

Cannon-class destroyer escort

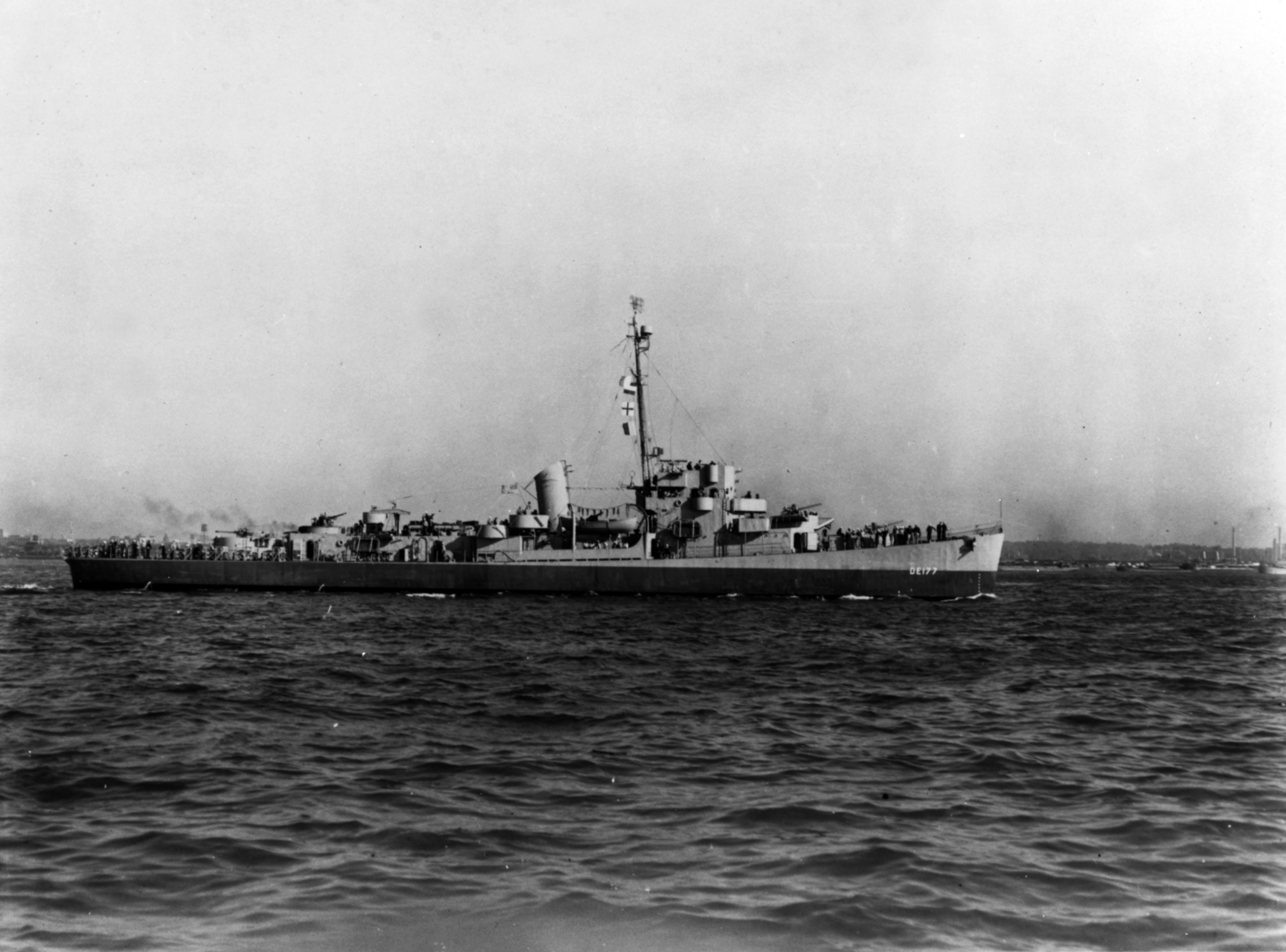

History

United States
- Name: USS Reybold
- Namesake: John Keane Reybold
- Builder: Federal Shipbuilding and Drydock Company, Newark, New Jersey
- Laid down: 3 May 1943
- Launched: 22 August 1943
- Commissioned: 29 September 1943
- Decommissioned: 15 August 1944
- Stricken: 20 July 1953
- Fate: Leased to Brazil, 15 August 1944; Transferred to Brazil, 30 June 1953

History

Brazil
- Name: Bracuí
- Acquired: 15 August 1944
- Decommissioned: 1972
- Fate: Scrapped

General characteristics
- Class & type: Cannon-class destroyer escort
- Displacement: 1,240 long tons (1,260 t) standard; 1,620 long tons (1,646 t) full
- Length: 306 ft (93 m) o/a; 300 ft (91 m) w/l
- Beam: 36 ft 10 in (11.23 m)
- Draft: 11 ft 8 in (3.56 m)
- Propulsion: 4 × GM Mod. 16-278A diesel engines with electric drive, 6,000 shp (4,474 kW), 2 screws
- Speed: 21 knots (39 km/h; 24 mph)
- Range: 10,800 nmi (20,000 km) at 12 kn (22 km/h; 14 mph)
- Complement: 15 officers and 201 enlisted
- Armament: 3 × single Mk.22 3-inch/50-caliber guns; 1 × twin 40 mm Mk.1 AA gun; 8 × 20 mm Mk.4 AA guns; 3 × 21 inch (533 mm) torpedo tubes; 1 × Hedgehog Mk.10 anti-submarine mortar (144 rounds); 8 × Mk.6 depth charge projectors; 2 × Mk.9 depth charge tracks

USS Reybold (DE-177) was a Cannon-class destroyer escort built for the United States Navy during World War II. She served in the Atlantic Ocean and provided escort service against submarine and air attack for Navy vessels and convoys.

Reybold was named in honor of John Keane Reybold who was killed by friendly fire during a convoy run. The ship was laid down on 3 May 1943 by the Federal Shipbuilding & Dry Dock Co., Port Newark, New Jersey; launched on 22 August 1943; sponsored by Mrs. John K. Reybold, widow of Lt. Comdr. John K. Reybold; and commissioned on 29 September 1943.

== World War II Atlantic Ocean operations ==
Following shakedown off Bermuda, Reybold operated briefly under ComSubLant, then completed an escort run from Rhode Island to the Panama Canal Zone. She then steamed to Norfolk, Virginia, before the end of 1943 and, on 2 January 1944, she sailed south to join the U.S. 4th Fleet. On the 15th, she arrived at Recife, Brazil, whence she escorted ships to Trinidad and back until July, interrupting that duty only for air/sea rescue operations at the end of May. In July, she guarded the sealanes between Brazil and Gibraltar, anchoring off the latter 13–15 July and returning to Recife on the 23rd to prepare for transfer to the Brazilian Navy.

== Decommissioning ==
Shifting to Natal, Brazil, on 9 August, Reybold was decommissioned and transferred under the terms of lend-lease to Brazil on 15 August 1944. Renamed Baurú, she continued operations under that name throughout the remainder of World War II and the 1940s. She was returned to the custody of the United States and transferred, permanently, under the terms of the military defense aid program, to Brazil on 30 June 1953. She initially operated with the pennant number BE 4, and later with the number D18. She continued to serve with the Brazilian Navy as Baurú until 11 July 1972.
