= USS Parks =

Cannon-class destroyer escort

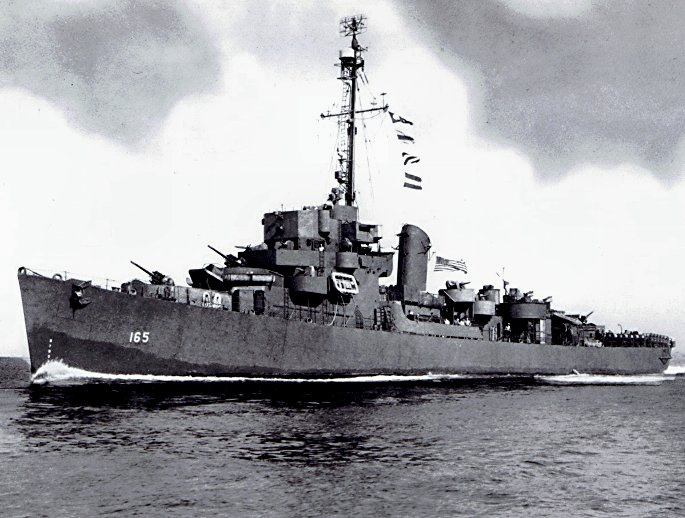

History

United States
- Name: USS Parks
- Builder: Federal Shipbuilding and Drydock Company, Newark, New Jersey
- Laid down: 11 November 1942
- Launched: 18 April 1943
- Commissioned: 23 June 1943
- Decommissioned: March 1946
- Stricken: 1 July 1972
- Honors and awards: 4 battle stars (World War II)
- Fate: Sold for scrapping, 15 October 1973

General characteristics
- Class & type: Cannon-class destroyer escort
- Displacement: 1,240 long tons (1,260 t) standard; 1,620 long tons (1,646 t) full
- Length: 306 ft (93 m) o/a; 300 ft (91 m) w/l
- Beam: 36 ft 10 in (11.23 m)
- Draft: 11 ft 8 in (3.56 m)
- Propulsion: 4 × GM Mod. 16-278A diesel engines with electric drive, 6,000 shp (4,474 kW), 2 screws
- Speed: 21 knots (39 km/h; 24 mph)
- Range: 10,800 nmi (20,000 km) at 12 kn (22 km/h; 14 mph)
- Complement: 15 officers and 201 enlisted
- Armament: 3 single × Mk.22 3"/50 caliber guns; 8 × 20 mm Mk.4 AA guns; 3 × 21 inch (533 mm) torpedo tubes; 1 × Hedgehog Mk.10 anti-submarine mortar (144 rounds); 8 × Mk.6 depth charge projectors; 2 × Mk.9 depth charge tracks

USS Parks (DE-165) was a Cannon-class destroyer escort in service with the United States Navy from 1943 to 1946. She was sold for scrapping in 1973.

== History ==
She was laid down on 11 November 1942 by the Federal Shipbuilding and Dry Dock Co., Newark, New Jersey; launched on 18 April 1943; sponsored by Miss Patricia Yoder; and commissioned on 23 June 1943.

Following commissioning, the new destroyer escort proceeded to Bermuda for shakedown, returned to New York before proceeding to Nouméa, New Caledonia via the Panama Canal, Galapagos Islands, and Bora Bora. With the exception of a short trip to Rendova, New Georgia, in January 1944, a diversionary trip to Funafuti, Ellice Islands, and another to Manus Island, Admiralty Islands in April 1944 escorting tankers, this ship's duties were largely patrolling and escorting between Espiritu Santo, New Hebrides and the Guadalcanal-Florida Island area. On two occasions, as an extension of escort duties between those two places, the ship went to Efate, New Hebrides.

In June 1944 Parks proceeded to Eniwetok Atoll, Marshall Islands. From there she participated in the fueling operations of the 5th Fleet supporting the invasion of Saipan and later acted as an escort during the conquest of Guam.

Parks next steamed via Eniwetok to Manus Island where she was assigned to a fueling group and acted as escort for tankers and carriers during the Palau, Ulithi campaigns. Shortly thereafter, Parks operated out of Ulithi and Manus escorting tankers and carriers to the Philippines which the Allies were liberating.

At Ulithi Atoll late in November, Parks received orders to proceed to Pearl Harbor. Upon arrival in Pearl Harbor, via Manus Island, Parks was ordered on to the West Coast and arrived at Newport Beach, California, on 1 March 1945 for overhaul.

On 16 April 1945 Parks departed San Diego, California, and proceeded to Eniwetok, taking up duties which consisted of ocean escort between Eniwetok and Ulithi, air-sea rescue, and hunter-killer operations in the surrounding area.

In mid-August, Parks proceeded to Majuro and thence steamed to Mili Atoll for the surrender of the Japanese garrison and the flag raising ceremony there on 28 August 1945. Immediately after, the Commanding Officer assumed duties of Representative Atoll Commander Majuro at Mili, which consisted of controlling the Japanese garrison of approximately 2400 men, supervising and aiding in the demilitarization of the atoll, disposal of all ammunition and explosives and sweeping of the mine fields.

On 13 September 1945 Parks proceeded to Majuro en route to Kwajalein. From Kwajalein Parks departed for Pearl Harbor, San Diego, and the Panama Canal.

Following repairs at the Brooklyn Navy Yard, Parks proceeded to Green Cove Springs, Florida, and reported to the Commander, 16th Fleet (Inactive) on 29 November 1945. She decommissioned in March 1946; but, with the Korean War, she was taken off the disposal list and placed in reserve at Green Cove Springs in May 1951. In 1970 she was berthed at Philadelphia, Pennsylvania. She was sold on 15 October 1973, and scrapped.

== Awards ==
Parks received four battle stars for World War II service.
