= USS Carroll =

Cannon-class destroyer escort

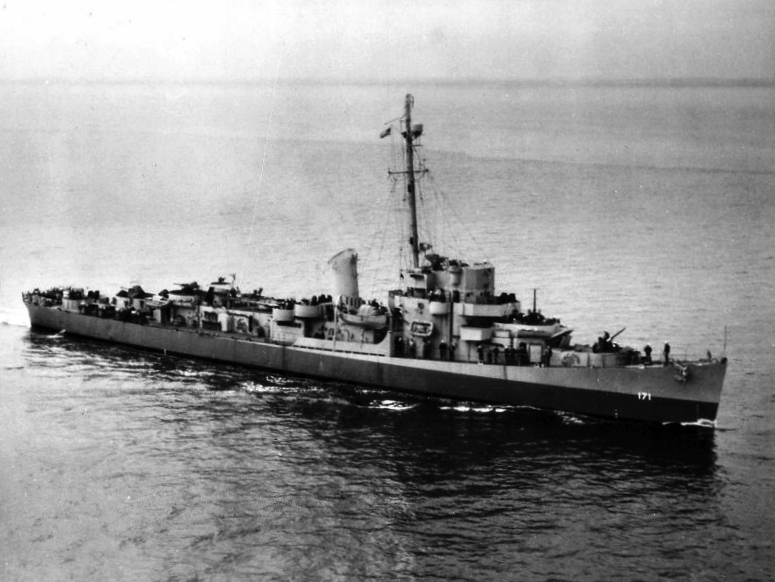

History

United States
- Name: USS Carroll
- Builder: Federal Shipbuilding and Drydock Company, Newark, New Jersey
- Laid down: 30 January 1943
- Launched: 21 June 1943
- Commissioned: 24 October 1943
- Decommissioned: 19 June 1946
- Stricken: 1 August 1965
- Fate: Sold for scrap, 29 December 1966

General characteristics
- Class & type: Cannon-class destroyer escort
- Displacement: 1,240 long tons (1,260 t) standard; 1,620 long tons (1,646 t) full
- Length: 306 ft (93 m) o/a; 300 ft (91 m) w/l
- Beam: 36 ft 10 in (11.23 m)
- Draft: 11 ft 8 in (3.56 m)
- Propulsion: 4 × GM Mod. 16-278A diesel engines with electric drive, 6,000 shp (4,474 kW), 2 screws
- Speed: 21 knots (39 km/h; 24 mph)
- Range: 10,800 nmi (20,000 km) at 12 kn (22 km/h; 14 mph)
- Complement: 15 officers and 201 enlisted
- Armament: 3 × single Mk.22 3"/50 caliber guns; 1 × twin 40 mm Mk.1 AA gun; 8 × 20 mm Mk.4 AA guns; 3 × 21 inch (533 mm) torpedo tubes; 1 × Hedgehog Mk.10 anti-submarine mortar (144 rounds); 8 × Mk.6 depth charge projectors; 2 × Mk.9 depth charge tracks

USS Carroll (DE-171) was a Cannon-class destroyer escort in service with the United States Navy from 1943 to 1946. She was sold for scrap in 1966.

== History ==
USS Carroll was launched on 21 June 1943 at the Federal Shipbuilding and Drydock Company, Newark, New Jersey, sponsored by Mrs. H. F. Carroll, Sr. (mother of LT Herbert F. Carroll, USN, ship's namesake); She was then towed to the Norfolk Navy Yard for completion and commissioned on 24 October 1943 and reported to the Atlantic Fleet.

=== World War II North Atlantic operations ===
Carroll was assigned to convoy escort duty, with its heavy demands for vigilance, ability to steam in all weather, and optimum readiness for duty at all times. Between 1 January 1944 and 9 May 1945, she made eight voyages between Norfolk, Virginia, and Gibraltar, Casablanca, Bizerte, and Algeria, guarding the men and supplies destined to carry the war through southern Europe. Between convoys, Carroll received necessary attention at east coast shipyards, and sharpened her training with exercises in Casco Bay.

=== World War II Pacific Theatre operations ===
With the coming to the European theater of the victory in which she had played a significant part, Carroll was reassigned to the Pacific Fleet, to which she reported at Cristobal, Canal Zone, on 9 June 1945. She sailed to San Diego, California, and Pearl Harbor for exercises through 15 July, when she sailed for Eniwetok, Saipan, and Ulithi, arriving on 17 August.

Until 3 November 1945, Carroll patrolled the smaller islands of the Palau group searching for by-passed Japanese garrisons and prisoners of war. On 6 October, the surrender of Sonsorol, Fanna, Merir, and Tobi Islands was signed on her decks. She then furnished supplies, and supervised the evacuation of the islands by the Japanese.

=== Post-War decommissioning ===
She was homeward bound on 3 November, and arrived at Jacksonville, Florida, on 14 December. Here she was decommissioned and placed in reserve on 19 June 1946. She was struck from the Navy List on 1 August 1965, sold on 29 December 1966 and scrapped.
