= USS Hilbert =

Cannon-class destroyer escort

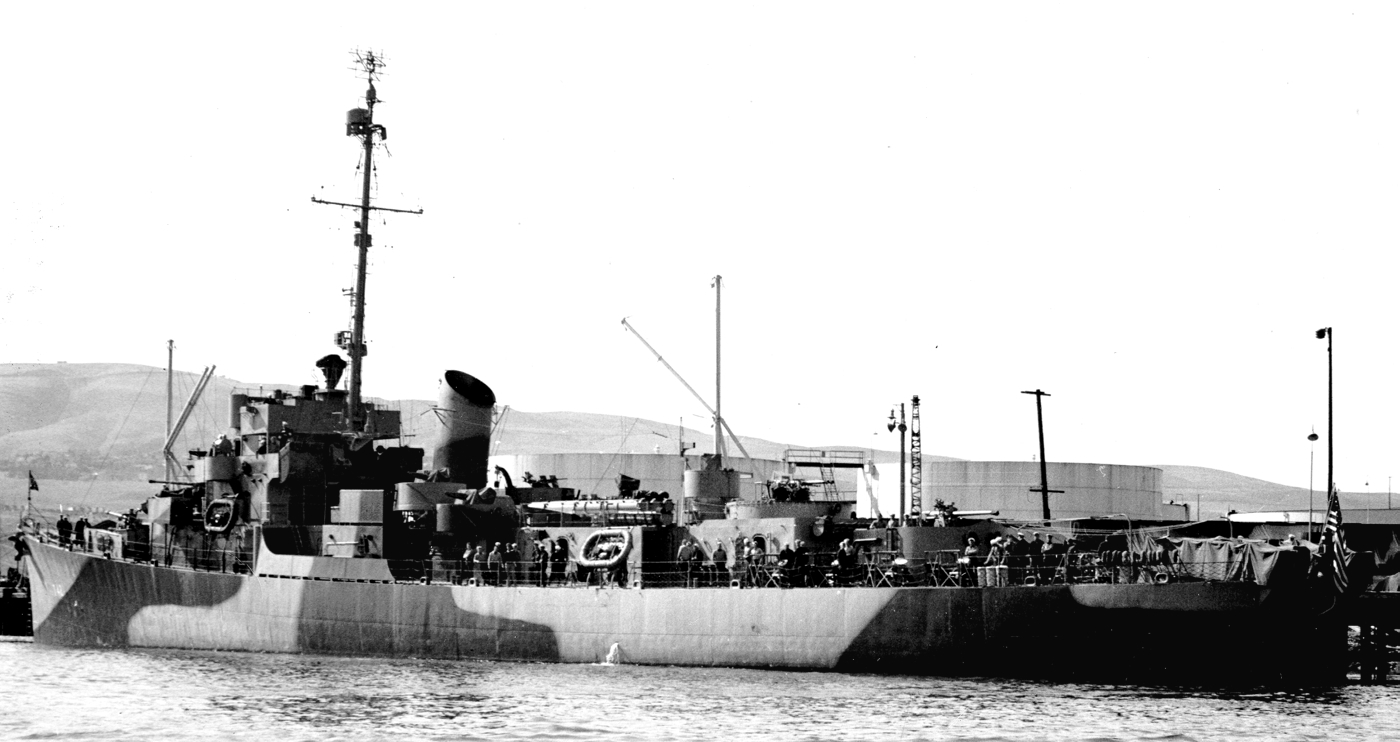

History

United States
- Name: USS Hilbert
- Namesake: Ernest Lenard Hilbert
- Builder: Western Pipe and Steel Company, Los Angeles, California
- Laid down: 23 March 1943
- Launched: 18 July 1943
- Commissioned: 4 February 1944
- Decommissioned: 19 June 1946
- Stricken: 1 August 1972
- Honors and awards: 8 battle stars (World War II)
- Fate: Sold for scrapping, 15 October 1973

General characteristics
- Class & type: Cannon-class destroyer escort
- Displacement: 1,240 long tons (1,260 t) standard; 1,620 long tons (1,646 t) full
- Length: 306 ft (93 m) o/a; 300 ft (91 m) w/l
- Beam: 36 ft 10 in (11.23 m)
- Draft: 11 ft 8 in (3.56 m)
- Propulsion: 4 × GM Mod. 16-278A diesel engines with electric drive, 6,000 shp (4,474 kW), 2 screws
- Speed: 21 knots (39 km/h; 24 mph)
- Range: 10,800 nmi (20,000 km) at 12 kn (22 km/h; 14 mph)
- Complement: 15 officers and 201 enlisted
- Armament: 3 × single Mk.22 3"/50 caliber guns; 1 × twin 40 mm Mk.1 AA gun; 8 × 20 mm Mk.4 AA guns; 3 × 21 inch (533 mm) torpedo tubes; 1 × Hedgehog Mk.10 anti-submarine mortar (144 rounds); 8 × Mk.6 depth charge projectors; 2 × Mk.9 depth charge tracks

USS Hilbert (DE-742) was a Cannon-class destroyer escort in service with the United States Navy from 1944 to 1946. She was sold for scrapping in 1973.

== Namesake ==
Ernest Lenard Hilbert was born on 14 June 1920 at Quinn, South Dakota. He enlisted in the United States Navy on 10 April 1940 at Los Angeles, California. In November 1940 he was assigned duty with Bombing Squadron 6 and took part in attacks on the Marshall Islands, Wake Island, and Marcus Island.

On 4 June 1942 during the Battle of Midway Aviation Ordnanceman Hilbert was killed during an aerial attack against Imperial Japanese Navy forces when his aircraft was shot down. he was posthumously awarded the Distinguished Flying Cross.

== History ==
The ship was launched on 18 July 1943 by the Western Pipe and Steel Company; sponsored by Mrs. Fern Hilbert Wier, sister of Aviation Ordnanceman Hilbert; and commissioned on 4 February 1944. After shakedown out of California Hilbert departed San Francisco, California, on 13 May 1944 escorting a transport. Arriving Pearl Harbor on 20 May, she proceeded to Kwajalein and joined the U.S. 5th Fleet. From June through August Hilbert screened the fueling group of Admiral R. K. Turner's Northern Attack Force for the capture of Saipan and Tinian. The Marianas were stoutly and bitterly contested, requiring great flexibility and fortitude before our fleet conquered the rugged and well-defended islands.

Hilbert also played a key role in protecting United States oilers which fueled Admiral Marc Mitscher's Fast Carrier Task Force engaged in the Battle of the Philippine Sea — s decisive battle in the war.

In October Hilbert joined Admiral Halsey's U.S. 3rd Fleet and screened the logistics group for the Battle of Leyte Gulf. She also participated in supporting actions in the operations against the Philippines, Iwo Jima, Okinawa and the Japanese home islands.

Hilbert, with other units of the 3rd Fleet, anchored for the first time in Japanese waters at Sagami Wan on 9 September 1945. Departing Tokyo on 29 September Hilbert sailed to Philadelphia, Pennsylvania, via Los Angeles, California, and the Panama Canal Zone, and thence to Green Cove Springs, Florida, arriving on 17 December.

She decommissioned on 19 June 1946 and joined the Reserve Fleet. In February 1952 Hilbert joined the Reserve Fleet at Philadelphia, Pennsylvania, where she remained until she was sold for scrapping, on 15 October 1973.

== Awards ==
Hilbert received eight battle stars for World War II service.
