= USS McClelland =

Cannon-class destroyer escort

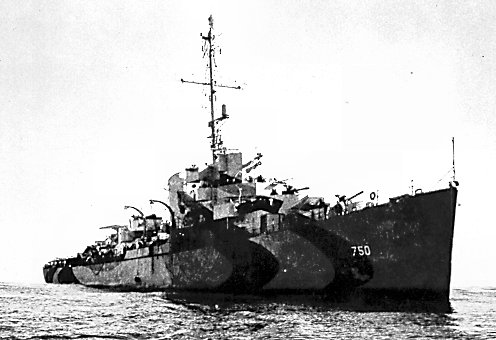
- USS McClelland (DE-750), undated wartime image.

History

United States
- Name: McClelland
- Namesake: Thomas Alfred McClelland
- Builder: Western Pipe and Steel Company, Los Angeles, California
- Laid down: 21 July 1943
- Launched: 28 November 1943
- Sponsored by: Mrs. T. A. McClelland, widow of Ensign McClelland
- Commissioned: 19 September 1944
- Decommissioned: 15 May 1946
- Recommissioned: 14 July 1950
- Decommissioned: 12 September 1960
- Stricken: 1 August 1972
- Identification: Hull symbol:DE-750; Code letters:NZWZ
- Honors and awards: 3 battle stars (World War II)
- Fate: Sold for scrapping, 1 November 1973

General characteristics
- Class & type: Cannon-class destroyer escort
- Displacement: 1,240 long tons (1,260 t) standard; 1,620 long tons (1,646 t) full
- Length: 306 ft (93 m) o/a; 300 ft (91 m) w/l
- Beam: 36 ft 10 in (11.23 m)
- Draft: 11 ft 8 in (3.56 m)
- Installed power: 4 × GM Mod. 16-278A diesel engines with electric drive; 6,000 shp (4,500 kW)
- Propulsion: 2 × screws
- Speed: 21 knots (39 km/h; 24 mph)
- Range: 10,800 nmi (20,000 km) at 12 kn (22 km/h; 14 mph)
- Complement: 15 officers and 201 enlisted
- Armament: 3 × 3 in (76 mm)/50 caliber Mk22 Dual purpose gun (3×1); 1 × twin 40 mm Mk.1 AA gun; 8 × 20 mm Mk.4 AA guns; 3 × 21 inch (533 mm) torpedo tubes; 1 × Hedgehog Mk.10 anti-submarine mortar (144 rounds); 8 × Mk.6 depth charge projectors; 2 × Mk.9 depth charge tracks

USS McClelland (DE-750) was a Cannon-class destroyer escort built for the United States Navy during World War II. She served in the Pacific Ocean and provided escort service against submarine and air attack for Navy vessels and convoys. Post-war she was reassigned as a training vessel.

She was named in honor of Ensign Thomas Alfred McClelland, who was reported dead after the Japanese attack on Pearl Harbor, on 7 December 1941. The ship was laid down on 21 July 1943 by the Western Pipe and Steel Company, San Pedro, Los Angeles, launched on 28 November 1943; sponsored by Mrs. T. A. McClelland, widow of Ensign McClelland; and commissioned on 19 September 1944.

== World War II Pacific Theatre operations ==
McClelland departed the west coast for Pearl Harbor on 11 December 1944. There, until 24 January 1945, she received further training in anti-submarine and anti-aircraft warfare in preparation for the assault on the Volcano Islands. By the end of January she was in the screen for task group TG 51.5 bound for Iwo Jima. She arrived off that island on 20 February, the day after the initial landings.

== Under attack by Kamikaze planes ==
On the 21st, TG 51.5 was attacked by three suicide planes; two scored hits on ships of the main body while the third was splashed. The next day, the combined fire of the group destroyed four more enemy aircraft as they went into their attack dive. Following this action, McClelland assumed anti-submarine screening duties and HUK activities to the north and west of the island.

== Supporting Okinawa invasion operations ==
On 28 February, the destroyer escort steamed to Espiritu Santo to prepare for the Okinawa offensive. She arrived off Okinawa on 9 April, remaining until 8 June. During that long, bitter campaign she took part in the capture of Isuken Shima; performed escort services among the Ryukyus, and helped to maintain the anti-air and anti-submarine screen. While she was patrolling on the latter duty, on 1 June, a kamikaze pilot dived from astern. McClelland's gunfire and fast maneuvering caused the airplane to splash when 25 yards off her starboard beam.

On 8 June, McClelland steamed to Saipan. On 4 July she joined the U.S. 3rd Fleet's logistics task group east of Japan. She screened that group, TG 30.8, as they provisioned units of TF 38, then striking the Japanese homeland. On 21 July she departed the area, escorting Presidio (APA-88) to Eniwetok, Ulithi, and Leyte. The two ships rejoined TG 30.8, 21 August, and after the signing of the official surrender document, sailed for Ulithi.

== End-of-War activity ==
McClelland arrived in Japanese waters on 27 September, remaining in Tokyo until 12 October when she sailed for the United States. She arrived Norfolk, Virginia, on 2 December, and 5 January 1946 departed for Green Cove Springs, Florida. There she decommissioned on 15 May and entered the Atlantic Reserve Fleet.

== Reassigned as training vessel ==
The following September, McClelland was placed in service and assigned to the 7th Naval District as a Reserve training vessel, operating out of Jacksonville, Florida. After the disestablishment of that district, she continued her training duties in the same area under the authority of the Commander, 6th Naval District. On 14 July 1950 the ship was placed in commission, in reserve, at Charleston, South Carolina. She conducted weekend and summer cruise programs for naval reservists of the 6th Naval District until 1959. Her summer cruises during this time took her as far north as St. John's, Newfoundland and Labrador; as far south as Barranquilla, Colombia; and as far east as Cadiz, Spain.

== Final decommissioning ==
In 1959 she was transferred to Philadelphia, Pennsylvania, and at the end of the year began deactivation for a second time. On 12 September 1960, she decommissioned and entered the Atlantic Inactive Fleet. She remained berthed at Philadelphia until sold for scrapping on 1 November 1973.

== Awards ==
McClelland received three battle stars for World War II service.

== Dedication ==
The McClelland participated in the dedication of Port Canaveral, Florida on 4 November 1953.
