= USS Lamons =

Cannon-class destroyer escort

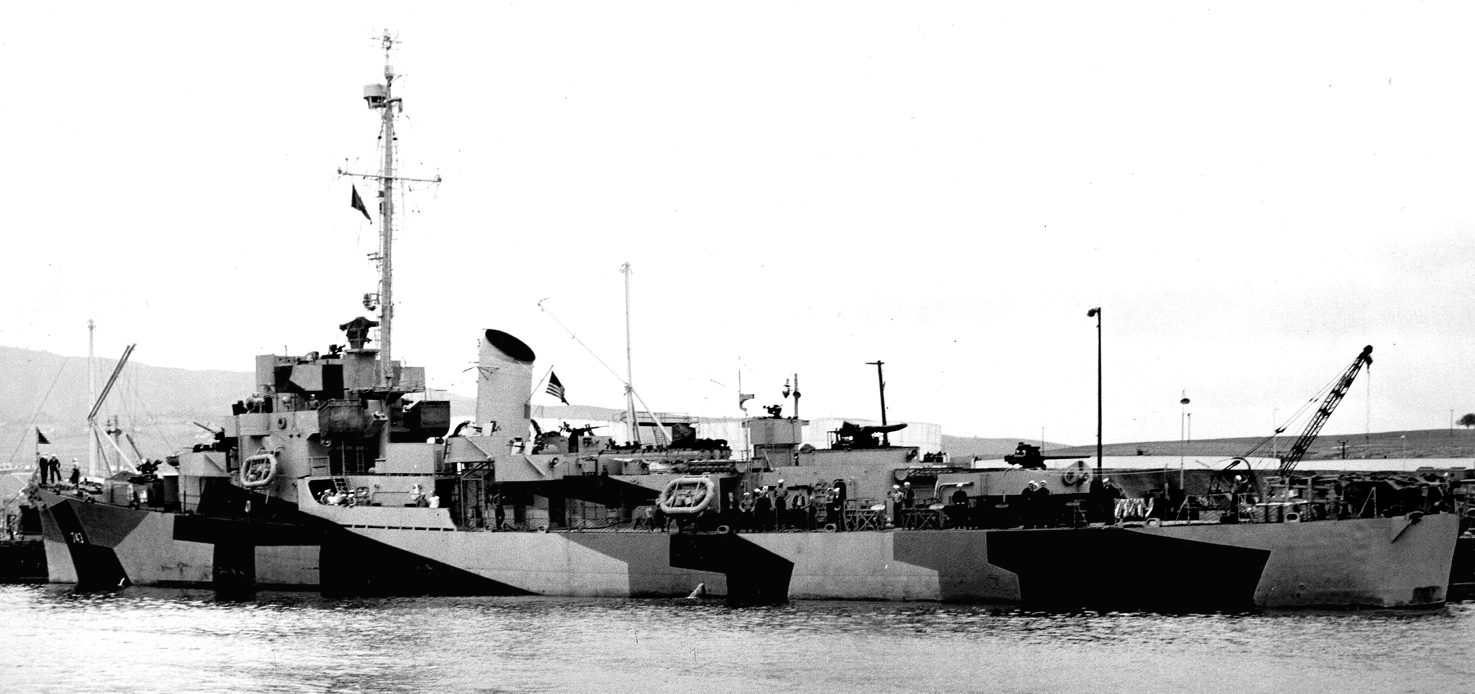

History

United States
- Name: USS Lamons
- Builder: Western Pipe and Steel Company, Los Angeles, California
- Laid down: 10 April 1943
- Launched: 1 August 1943
- Commissioned: 29 February 1944
- Decommissioned: 14 June 1946
- Stricken: 1 August 1972
- Honours and awards: 9 battle stars for World War II
- Fate: Sold for scrapping, 15 October 1973

General characteristics
- Class & type: Cannon-class destroyer escort
- Displacement: 1,240 long tons (1,260 t) standard; 1,620 long tons (1,646 t) full
- Length: 306 ft (93 m) o/a; 300 ft (91 m) w/l
- Beam: 36 ft 10 in (11.23 m)
- Draft: 11 ft 8 in (3.56 m)
- Propulsion: 4 × GM Mod. 16-278A diesel engines with electric drive, 6,000 shp (4,474 kW), 2 screws
- Speed: 21 knots (39 km/h; 24 mph)
- Range: 10,800 nmi (20,000 km) at 12 kn (22 km/h; 14 mph)
- Complement: 15 officers and 201 enlisted
- Armament: 3 × single Mk.22 3"/50 caliber guns; 1 × twin 40 mm Mk.1 AA gun; 8 × 20 mm Mk.4 AA guns; 3 × 21 inch (533 mm) torpedo tubes; 1 × Hedgehog Mk.10 anti-submarine mortar (144 rounds); 8 × Mk.6 depth charge projectors; 2 × Mk.9 depth charge tracks

USS Lamons (DE-743) was a Cannon-class destroyer escortin service with the United States Navy from 1944 to 1946. She was sold for scrapping in 1973.

== History ==
=== Pacific War ===
USS Lamons was named in honor of Kenneth Tafe Lamons, whose brave actions led to his death from wounds received in the Japanese attack on Pearl Harbor on 7 December 1941. The ship was laid down on 10 April 1943 by the Western Pipe and Steel Company, San Pedro, Los Angeles; launched on 1 August 1943; sponsored by Mrs. Leora M. Lamons, widow of Boatswain Mate Second Class Lamons; and commissioned on 29 February 1944.

After shakedown Lamons departed San Francisco, California, on 10 May 1944, escorting three merchant ships to the western Pacific. She arrived Majuro Atoll, Marshall Islands, on 3 June, and joined the screen of fueling groups supporting the invasion of Saipan. The destroyer escort remained in the Marianas until Saipan was secure.

The fleet next turned to the Palau Islands which were needed as staging points for ships and aircraft during the forthcoming Leyte landings. During September Lamons screened fueling groups which replenished ships en route to the Peleliu assault.

Returning to Manus on 1 October, the destroyer escort prepared for the vital Philippine Islands invasion. Sailing on 4 October with Task Group 30.8, Lamons steamed toward the fueling areas off Leyte. For the next three months she operated-as a screen for oilers replenishing the fleet during the Philippine campaign. With Leyte secured, Lamons departed Ulithi on 29 December as screen for a refueling group supporting the Luzon landings.

The destroyer escort returned to Ulithi on 27 January 1945 and prepared for her next assignment, the invasion of Iwo Jima. Departing Ulithi on 8 February, she steamed toward the tiny volcanic island which was needed as a stop-over base for B-29 air raids on Japan. Lamons remained in the fueling areas until early March supporting the bloody but inspiring struggle which wrested this invaluable strategic base from Japanese hands.

Preparations for the invasion of Okinawa, the last remaining barrier on the road to Japan, were now complete. Lamons sailed on 19 March to screen oilers as they refueled the ships of the greatest armada assembled during the Pacific war. After remaining in the vicinity throughout the Okinawa campaign, she sailed on 26 June to protect the escort carriers which assured troops of the U.S. 8th Army air superiority during landings in Balikpapan, Borneo.

The Navy now turned to Japan itself. In mid-July, Lamons sailed with Task Group 30.8 to fuel carriers engaged in air raids on the enemy homeland. The destroyer escort continued these operations until after Japan capitulated. She arrived at Ulithi on 31 August for a brief respite but was at sea again on 10 September escorting the oiler Escambia (AO-80) to Okinawa before sailing for home on 1 October.

=== Decommissioning and fate ===
After a brief stop at San Pedro, Los Angeles, the destroyer escort sailed for the east coast, arriving Philadelphia, Pennsylvania, on 23 November. Lamons decommissioned at Green Cove Springs, Florida, on 14 June 1946, and joined the Atlantic Reserve Fleet in February 1951. She was berthed at Philadelphia until sold for scrapping, on 15 October 1973.

== Awards ==
Lamons received nine battle stars for World War II service.
