= USS Clarence L. Evans =

Cannon-class destroyer escort

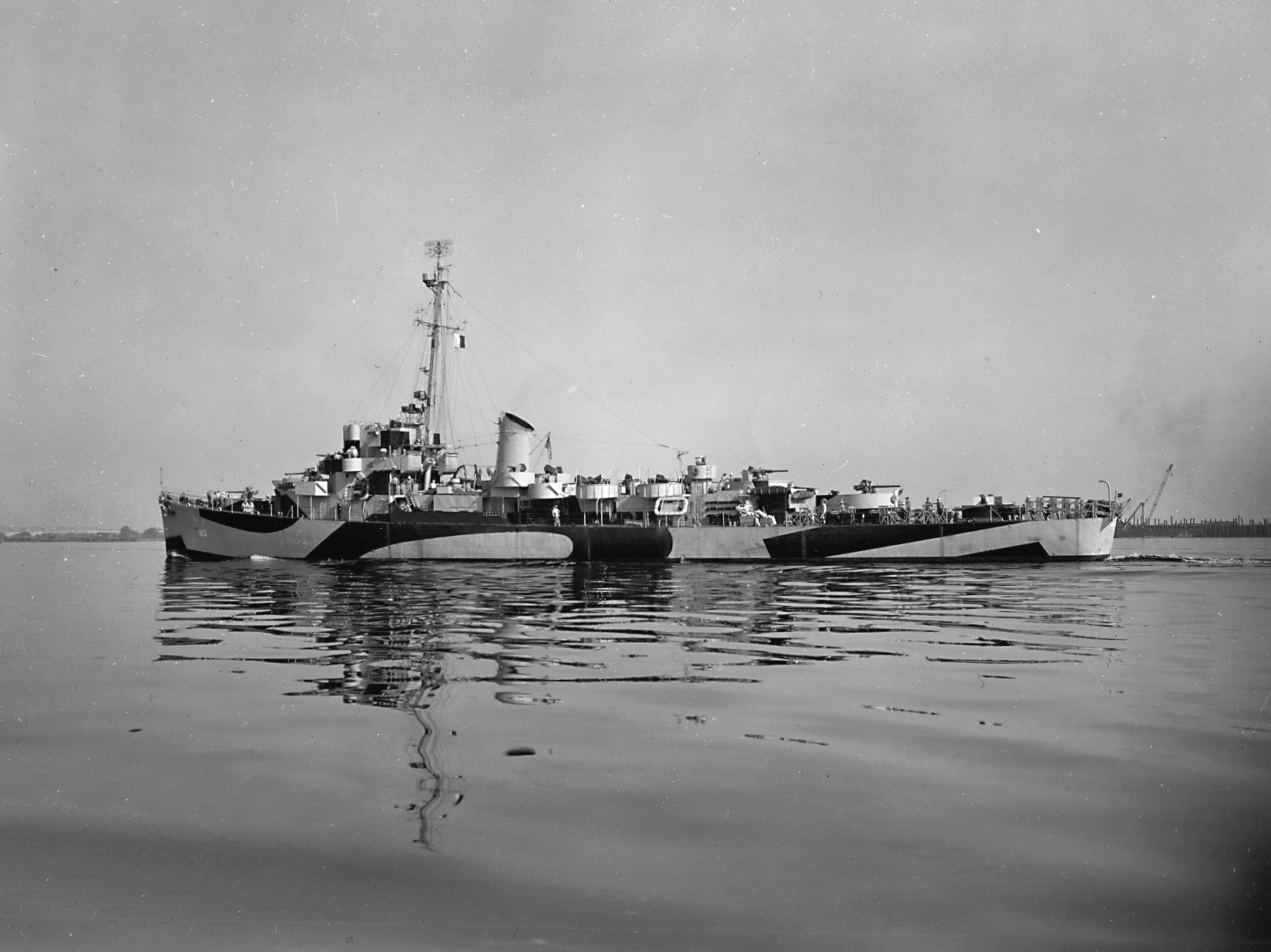
- Destroyer Escort USS Clarence L. Evans(DE-113)

History

United States
- Name: USS Clarence L. Evans (DE-113)
- Namesake: Clarence Lee Evans
- Builder: Dravo Corporation, Wilmington, Delaware
- Laid down: 23 December 1943
- Launched: 22 March 1944
- Commissioned: 25 June 1944
- Decommissioned: 29 May 1947
- Stricken: 18 April 1952
- Fate: Transferred to France, 29 March 1952

History

France
- Name: Berbère (F723)
- Namesake: Berbers
- Acquired: 29 March 1952
- Stricken: 1960
- Fate: Scrapped

General characteristics
- Class & type: Cannon-class destroyer escort
- Displacement: 1,240 long tons (1,260 t) standard; 1,620 long tons (1,646 t) full
- Length: 306 ft (93 m) o/a; 300 ft (91 m) w/l
- Beam: 36 ft 10 in (11.23 m)
- Draft: 11 ft 8 in (3.56 m)
- Propulsion: 4 × GM Mod. 16-278A diesel engines with electric drive, 6,000 shp (4,474 kW), 2 screws
- Speed: 21 knots (39 km/h; 24 mph)
- Range: 10,800 nmi (20,000 km) at 12 kn (22 km/h; 14 mph)
- Complement: 15 officers and 201 enlisted
- Armament: 3 single × Mk.22 3"/50 caliber guns; 8 × 20 mm Mk.4 AA guns; 3 × 21 inch (533 mm) torpedo tubes; 1 × Hedgehog Mk.10 anti-submarine mortar (144 rounds); 8 × Mk.6 depth charge projectors; 2 × Mk.9 depth charge tracks

USS Clarence L. Evans (DE-113) was a Cannon-class destroyer escort built for the United States Navy during World War II. She served in the Atlantic Ocean and provided escort service against submarine and air attacks for Navy vessels and convoys. She was launched on 22 March 1944 by Dravo Corporation, Wilmington, Delaware, sponsored by Mrs. E. E. Evans; commissioned on 25 June 1944 and reported to the Atlantic Fleet.

== Namesake ==
Clarence Lee Evans was born on 27 April 1923 in Saginaw, Missouri. He enlisted in the United States Marine Corps Reserve on 31 May 1941.

After training at San Diego, California, Evans served in the field from 20 January 1942 until 25 November 1942, when he was killed in action in the Guadalcanal Campaign. He was awarded the Navy Cross for extraordinary heroism in capturing two enemy machine gun nests two days before his death.

== History ==
=== World War II North Atlantic operations ===
Clarence L. Evans reported at Norfolk, Virginia, on 2 September 1944 for duty in training precommissioning crews of other escort vessels. Here she conducted tests of newly developed 3-inch ammunition and acoustic torpedo defense equipment.

On 19 October she cleared Norfolk, Virginia, for the first of five convoy crossings from New York City to Glasgow, Southampton, Plymouth, and Le Havre. These trips, which averaged about 30 days for each voyage, were alternated with training duties at New London, Connecticut, or Casco Bay.

On 29 May 1945, Clarence L. Evans was put into Brooklyn for overhaul until 22 June. She then reported to Naval Air Station Quonset Point for duty as a plane guard during carrier qualification exercises. She cleared Narragansett Bay on 17 August for Miami, Florida, assumed plane guard duty until 2 October, then cleared for Brooklyn, New York, and overhaul.

=== Post-war decommissioning ===
Clarence L. Evans reported to Green Cove Springs, Florida, on 10 November, where she was placed out of commission in reserve on 29 May 1947. She was lent to France under the Military Assistance Program on 29 March 1952. The ship was given the name Berbère by the French Navy and bore the Pennant number F 723. Berbère was stricken in 1960.

== See also ==
- List of Escorteurs of the French Navy
