= USS Cooner =

Cannon-class destroyer escort

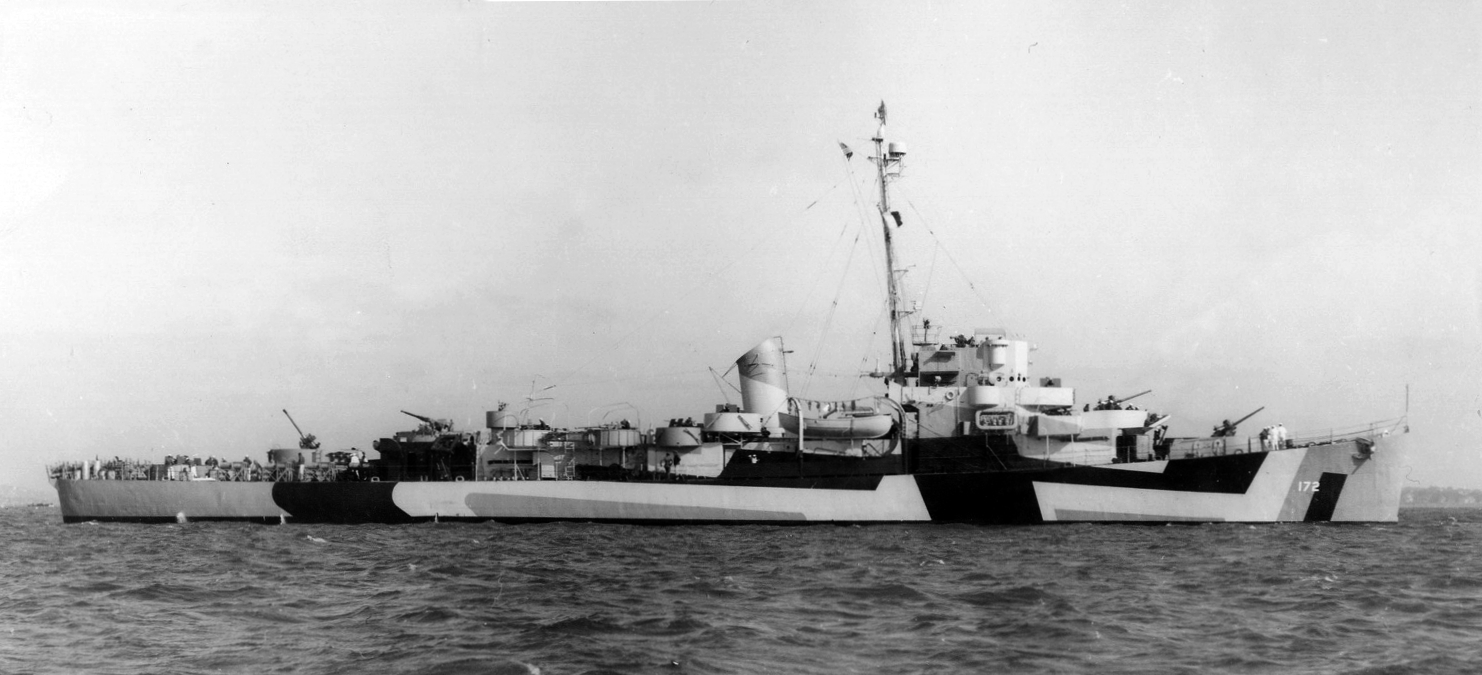

History

United States
- Name: USS Cooner
- Namesake: Bunyan Randolph Cooner
- Builder: Federal Shipbuilding and Drydock Company, Newark, New Jersey
- Laid down: 22 February 1943
- Launched: 23 July 1943
- Commissioned: 21 August 1943
- Decommissioned: 25 June 1946
- Stricken: 1 July 1972
- Fate: Sold for scrap, 1 November 1973

General characteristics
- Class & type: Cannon-class destroyer escort
- Displacement: 1,240 long tons (1,260 t) standard; 1,620 long tons (1,646 t) full
- Length: 306 ft (93 m) o/a; 300 ft (91 m) w/l
- Beam: 36 ft 10 in (11.23 m)
- Draft: 11 ft 8 in (3.56 m)
- Propulsion: 4 × GM Mod. 16-278A diesel engines with electric drive, 6,000 shp (4,474 kW), 2 screws
- Speed: 21 knots (39 km/h; 24 mph)
- Range: 10,800 nmi (20,000 km) at 12 kn (22 km/h; 14 mph)
- Complement: 15 officers and 201 enlisted
- Armament: 3 × single Mk.22 3"/50 caliber guns; 1 × twin 40 mm Mk.1 AA gun; 8 × 20 mm Mk.4 AA guns; 3 × 21 inch (533 mm) torpedo tubes; 1 × Hedgehog Mk.10 anti-submarine mortar (144 rounds); 8 × Mk.6 depth charge projectors; 2 × Mk.9 depth charge tracks

USS Cooner (DE-172) was a Cannon-class destroyer escort in service with the United States Navy from 1943 to 1946. She was sold for scrap in 1973.

== Namesake ==
Bunyan Randolph Cooner was born on 27 February 1914 at Columbia, South Carolina. He enlisted in the United States Naval Reserve on 12 June 1939. After flight training, he was commissioned Ensign on 3 September 1941 and served with Bombing Squadron 3 (VB-3) on the aircraft carrier USS Saratoga. He won the Navy Cross for service in the Battle of Midway, participating in vigorous and repeated attacks against Imperial Japanese Navy warships. He was killed in a plane crash during flight operations out of Pearl Harbor on 16 June 1942.

== History ==
Cooner was launched 23 July 1943 by Federal Shipbuilding and Drydock Co., Kearny, New Jersey; sponsored by Mrs. I. Cooner; and commissioned 21 August 1943.

=== World War II North Atlantic operations ===
Between 1 November 1943 and 9 May 1945, Cooner made nine voyages escorting convoys between New York and North African ports.

=== World War II Pacific Theatre operations ===
With the winning of victory of Europe, the veteran of the Atlantic Ocean was ordered to the Pacific Ocean, and on 28 June 1945 arrived at Pearl Harbor. She sailed on to Ulithi, where between 8 and 20 August she had patrol and radar picket duty. After escorting a transport to Guam and putting into Okinawa, she returned to Ulithi to load troops, whom she carried to Guam for further transportation to the United States. She herself sailed to Saipan, where from 23 September to 1 November, she stood ready to perform air-sea rescues during the heavy traffic carrying men home from the western Pacific. Homeward bound, she called at Pearl Harbor and San Diego, California, en route to Charleston, South Carolina, where she arrived 4 December.

=== Post-War decommissioning ===
There she was decommissioned and placed in reserve 25 June 1946. She was struck on 1 July 1972 and sold on 1 November 1973 and scrapped.
