= USS Earl K. Olsen =

Cannon-class destroyer escort

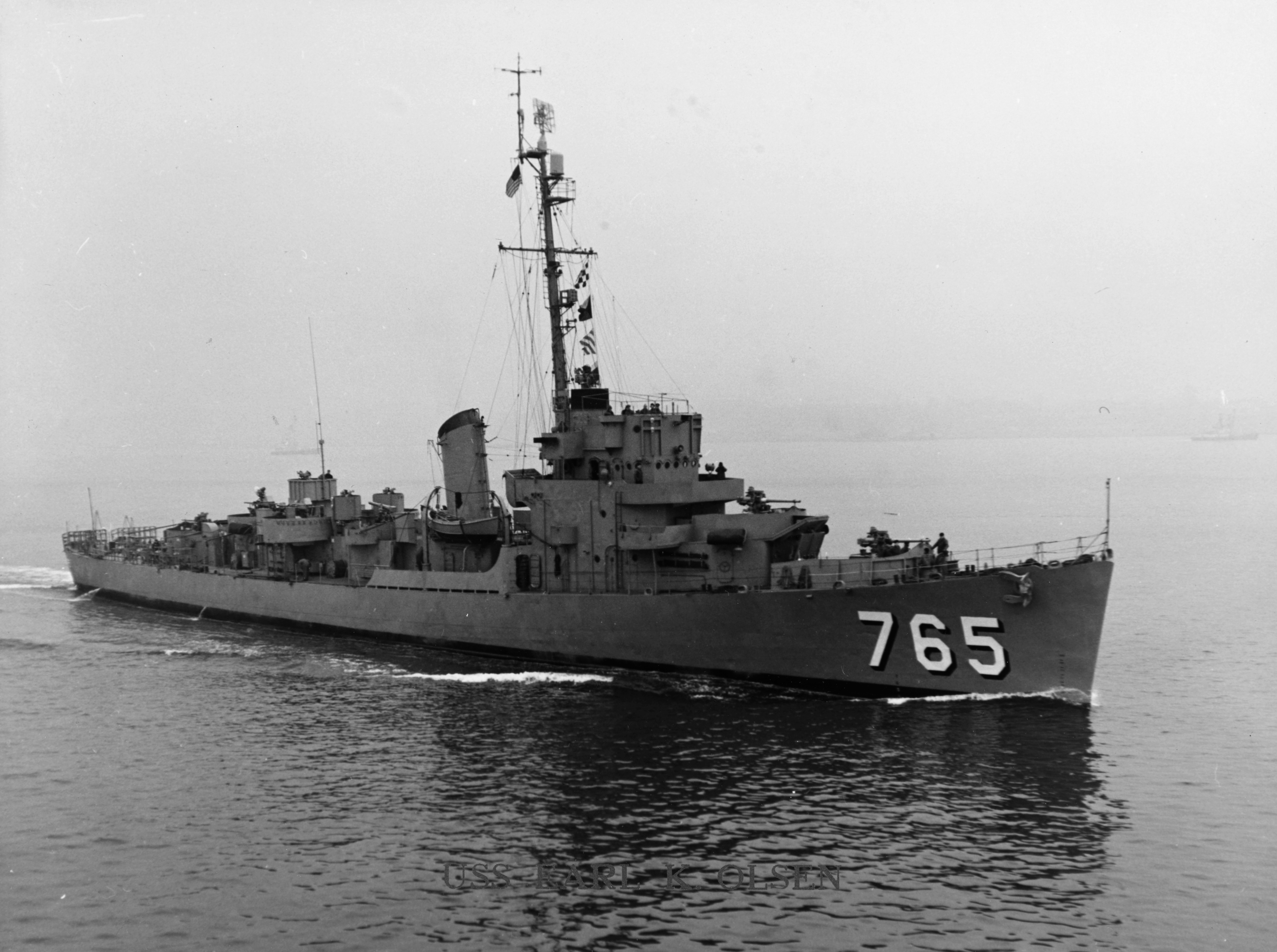

History

United States
- Name: USS Earl K. Olsen
- Namesake: Earl Kenneth Olsen
- Builder: Tampa Shipbuilding Company, Tampa, Florida
- Laid down: 9 March 1943
- Launched: 13 February 1944
- Commissioned: 10 April 1944
- Decommissioned: 17 June 1946
- Recommissioned: 21 November 1950
- Decommissioned: 25 February 1958
- Stricken: 1 August 1972
- Fate: Sold for scrap, 15 October 1973

General characteristics
- Class & type: Cannon-class destroyer escort
- Displacement: 1,240 long tons (1,260 t) standard; 1,620 long tons (1,646 t) full
- Length: 306 ft (93 m) o/a; 300 ft (91 m) w/l
- Beam: 36 ft 10 in (11.23 m)
- Draft: 11 ft 8 in (3.56 m)
- Propulsion: 4 × GM Mod. 16-278A diesel engines with electric drive, 6,000 shp (4,474 kW), 2 screws
- Speed: 21 knots (39 km/h; 24 mph)
- Range: 10,800 nmi (20,000 km) at 12 kn (22 km/h; 14 mph)
- Complement: 15 officers and 201 enlisted
- Armament: 3 × single Mk.22 3"/50 caliber guns; 1 × twin 40 mm Mk.1 AA gun; 8 × 20 mm Mk.4 AA guns; 3 × 21 inch (533 mm) torpedo tubes; 1 × Hedgehog Mk.10 anti-submarine mortar (144 rounds); 8 × Mk.6 depth charge projectors; 2 × Mk.9 depth charge tracks

USS Earl K. Olsen (DE-765) was a Cannon-class destroyer escort in service with the United States Navy from 1944 to 1946 and from 1950 to 1958. She was sold for scrapping in 1973.

== Namesake ==
Earl Kenneth Olsen was born on 2 July 1903 in Brooklyn, New York. He attended the U.S. Naval Academy Class of 1926. After varied duty afloat and ashore, he was ordered to USS Pensacola on 9 February 1939. Lieutenant Commander Olsen was serving as engineering officer during the night Battle of Tassafaronga, off Guadalcanal, 30 November-1 December 1942. When a torpedo hit flooded the engine room, he directed evacuation of survivors. Attempting to carry another officer to safety, he himself succumbed to smoke and toxic gases. He was posthumously awarded the Navy Cross.

== History ==
She was launched on 13 February 1944 by Tampa Shipbuilding Co., Inc., Tampa, Florida; sponsored by Mrs. H. E. Olsen, mother of Lieutenant Commander Olsen; and commissioned on 10 April 1944, Lieutenant Commander W. F. DeLong, USNR, commanding; Lieutenant Robert G. Nichols, USN, executive officer.

=== Battle of the Atlantic ===
After serving as school ship for the Fleet Sound School at Key West, Florida, from 24 June to 13 August 1944, Earl K. Olsen sailed to Casco Bay, Maine, for refresher training before reporting to Boston, Massachusetts, on 24 August, for convoy duty.

Between 28 August 1944 and 24 May 1945, she made six voyages escorting convoys between Boston, New York, and United Kingdom ports. On the fifth voyage as the convoy sailed for Southampton, USAT J. W. McAndrew and the Béarn collided on 13 March in a violent storm. Earl K. Olsen rescued two men and escorted the two stricken ships into Ponta Delgada, Azores, for emergency repairs while Olsen rejoined her convoy.

=== Pacific War ===
At the close of the war in Europe, Earl K. Olsen, now under the command of Lieutenant Commander Robert G. Nichols USN, sailed from New York on 8 June 1945 to join the Pacific Fleet, training at Guantanamo Bay, Cuba, during her passage to Pearl Harbor. She arrived on 19 July. Heading west again on 6 August, she escorted ships to island ports and arrived at Manila on 3 September. The same day she commenced the first of four voyages to escort LSTs to Yokohama, and then operated in the Philippines until 9 January 1946. Earl K. Olsen returned to San Pedro, California, on 24 February 1946, and sailed on 10 March for Norfolk, Virginia, arriving the 26th. On 11 April she got underway for Green Cove Springs, Florida, arriving the 13th, to decommission. Her captain at decommissioning was Lieutenant Commander Robert G. Nichols USN. She was placed out of commission in reserve on 17 June 1946.

=== Cold War ===
Assigned to Naval Reserve duty on 13 December 1946, Earl K. Olsen was towed to Tampa, Florida, and served with reduced complement. Recommissioned on 21 November 1950, she reached Charleston, South Carolina, her new home port, on 7 January 1951. With her complement increased, she continued to train Naval Reservists, but with a larger cruising range, visiting the Caribbean, France, Spain and Portugal two summers, 1951 and 1955. From 18 July 1953, she continued Reserve training duty out of Philadelphia, Pennsylvania, punctuated by fleet exercises.

=== Decommissioning and fate ===
Reporting for inactivation on 23 November 1957, Earl K. Olsen was placed out of commission in reserve again on 25 February 1958, at Philadelphia. She was sold on 15 October 1973 and broken up for scrap.
