= BRP Rajah Humabon (PS-11) =

1943 Cannon-class destroyer escort

Coordinates: 14.4952845°N 120.9177217°E

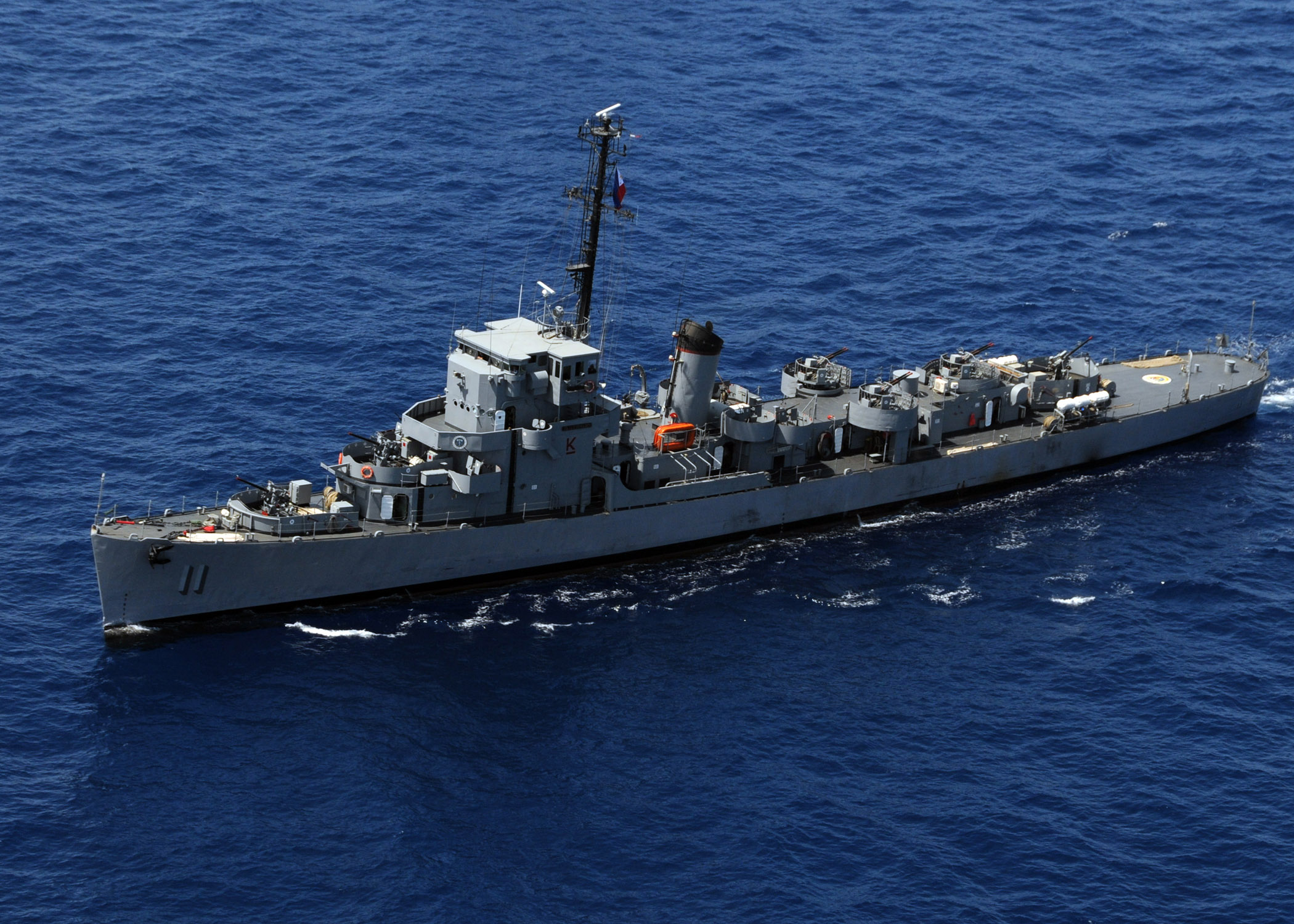
- BRP Rajah Humabon (PS-11)

History

United States
- Name: Atherton
- Ordered: 1942
- Builder: Federal Drydock & Shipbuilding Co.
- Laid down: 14 January 1943
- Launched: 27 May 1943
- Commissioned: 29 August 1943
- Decommissioned: 10 December 1945
- Stricken: 15 June 1975
- Fate: Transferred to JMSDF in 1955, reverted to US Navy in 1975. Transferred to Philippine Navy in 1976.

Japan
- Name: Hatsuhi
- Commissioned: 1955
- Decommissioned: 1975
- Fate: reverted to US Navy in 1975.

Philippines
- Name: Rajah Humabon
- Namesake: Rajah Humabon was the native ruler of Cebu in the Philippines at the time of Ferdinand Magellan's arrival in the archipelago in 1521.
- Acquired: 23 December 1978
- Commissioned: 27 February 1980
- Recommissioned: January 1996
- Decommissioned: 15 March 2018
- Renamed: BRP Rajah Humabon (PF-6) - 28 June 1980; BRP Rajah Humabon (PF-11) - January 1996; BRP Rajah Humabon (PS-11) - April 2016
- Home port: Naval Base Cavite
- Fate: Seen capsized on 30 October 2022

General characteristics
- Class & type: Datu Kalantiaw-class (Cannon-class) destroyer escort / frigate
- Displacement: 1,390 tons standard, 1,620 tons full load
- Length: 306 ft (93 m)
- Beam: 36.66 ft (11.17 m)
- Draft: 8.75 ft (2.67 m)
- Installed power: 6,140 hp (4,580 kW)
- Propulsion: 2 × GM-EMD 16-645E7 (Turbo) main diesel engines; 2 × GM-EMD 8-268A auxiliary diesel engines with 200 kW generator; 1 × GM-EMD 3-268A auxiliary diesel engine with 100 kW generator; 2 × shafts
- Speed: 18 knots (33 km/h) sustained maximum; 21 knots (39 km/h) tops
- Range: 6,000 nmi (11,000 km) at 14 knots (26 km/h); 10,800 nmi (20,000 km) at 12 knots (22 km/h)
- Complement: 165
- Sensors & processing systems: Raytheon AN/SPS-64(V)11 Surface Search and Navigational Radar; Furuno navigation radar; AN/SQS-17B Hull mounted Sonar; Mk.52 GFCS with Mk.41 Rangefinder for 3-inch (76 mm) guns; 3 × Mk.51 GFCS for 40 mm guns
- Armament: 3 × Mk.22 76 mm U.S. 3-inch/50-caliber guns; 3 × Mk.1 Mod.2 Twin Bofors 40 mm L/60 autocannons; 6 × Mk.10 Oerlikon 20 mm autocannons; 4 × M2 Browning .50-caliber machine guns

BRP Rajah Humabon (PS-11) was a former destroyer escort of the United States Navy and a former frigate of the Philippine Navy. She was the last World War II-era destroyer escort/frigate active in her fleet, and one of the oldest active warships in the world, until 15 March 2018 when she was formally decommissioned after 75 years. She was one of three ex-USN Cannon-class destroyer escorts that served the Philippine Navy, the others being BRP Datu Sikatuna (PF-5/PS-77) and BRP Datu Kalantiaw (PS-76).

== History ==
=== United States Navy ===
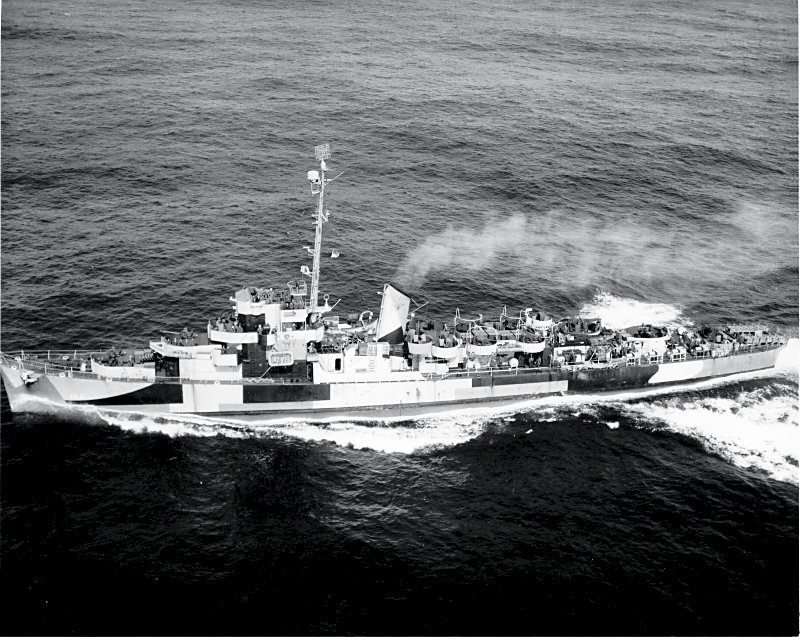
as USS Atherton c. 1945

Commissioned in the United States Navy as the USS Atherton (DE-169) in 1943, she was mostly assigned at the Atlantic theater doing patrols and anti-submarine missions. She was credited of having destroyed a German U-boat, U-853 off the coast of Rhode Island, on 9 May 1945. She served in the Pacific theater in the middle of 1945 until she was decommissioned and placed in reserve on 10 December 1945. For her service during World War II, she was awarded with one battle star.

=== Japan Maritime Self-Defense Force ===
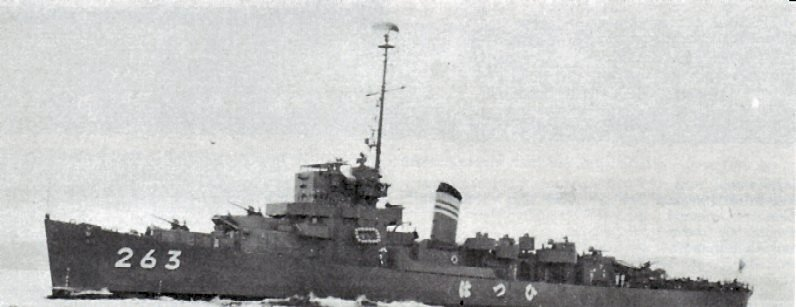
as JMSDF Hatsuhi c. 1967

She was transferred to the Japanese government as JDS Hatsuhi (DE-263) on 14 June 1955. Together with her sister ship JDS Asahi, they became one of the first warships of the newly organized Japan Maritime Self-Defense Force (JMSDF). As newer ships became available to the JMSDF, both ships were decommissioned and returned to the US Navy in June 1975.

=== Philippine Navy ===
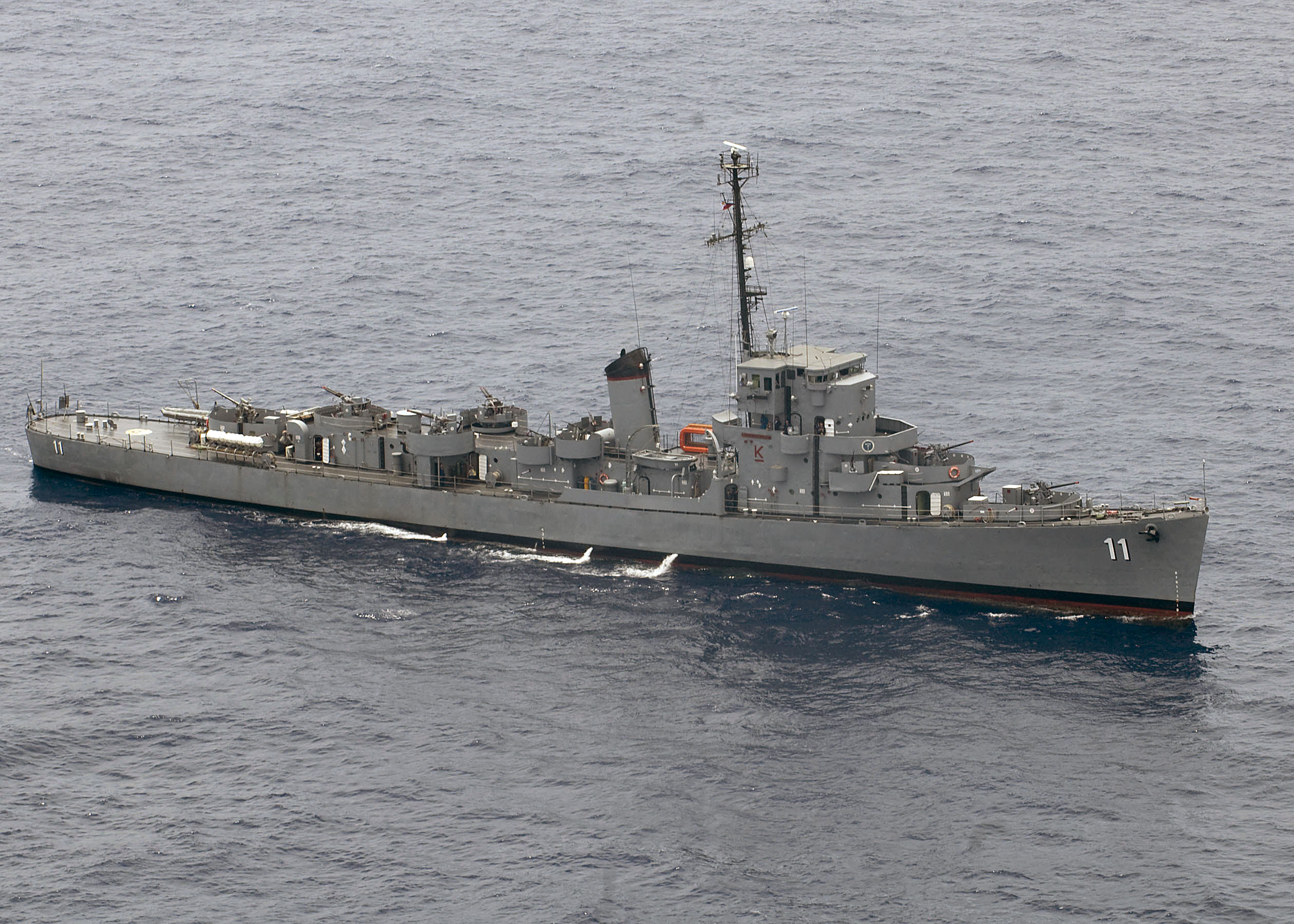
BRP Rajah Humabon c. 2009

Remained laid-up in Japan, she was transferred to the Philippine government on 13 September 1976 and was Transferred as an Excess Defense Article on 23 December 1978. As a Philippine Navy ship, she was named RPS Rajah Humabon (PS-78), and was towed to South Korea for an extensive refit and modernization in 1979. During this period South Korea also turned over two of their own ex-USN Cannon-class ships to the US Navy in 1977, namely the Kyong Ki (DE-71) / Muir and Kang Won (DE-72) / Sutton. These were also turned-over by the US to the Philippine government, which were later on cannibalized for use as parts hulk to upgrade and repair the Rajah Humabon and her sister ship Datu Sikatuna.

With these upgrades, she was formally commissioned to the Philippine Navy on 27 February 1980, and formed the backbone of the Philippine Fleet together with 2 of her sister ships and other ex-US Navy destroyer escorts. She was renamed and reclassified as BRP Rajah Humabon (PF-6) effective 23 June 1980, now using the "BRP" ship prefix in lieu of "RPS" and following a new standard classifying it as a "Frigate", and served until 1993 when she was retired. But due to pressing needs, she was later called back into service in 1995 after being overhauled at the Cavite Naval Dockyard by Hatch & Kirk Inc., and was formally recommissioned in January 1996 as BRP Rajah Humabon (PF-11) with a new hull number.

Another minor refit between 1995 and 1996 saw changes in the ship's weapons, sensors and engine systems. Her anti-submarine weapons and equipment were removed due to lack of spare parts. The removed equipment includes the EDO SQS-17B hull-mounted sonar, a Mk.9 depth charge rack, six Mk.6 depth charge projects aft and a Hedgehog Mk.10 anti-submarine projectors forward, as well as Mk.38 anti-submarine torpedoes in two triple tube amidships. The loss of these items totally removed her anti-submarine warfare capabilities, which was outdated by modern standards. But it was reported in 2005 that her fore Hedgehog ASW is still operational, together with her 8 K-gun Mk6 depth charge projectors and SQS-17B sonar, although recent photos do not show the depth charge projectors on its usual location.

She had been experiencing hull problems, but was repaired with the assistance of the crew of the US Navy's ship USS Salvor during CARAT 2002 dive training operations held in Manila Bay.

Additional electronic upgrades were made, including the installation of a Furuno Satellite Communication system and a mast-mounted FLIR package.

The ship's code designation was changed based on a new classification, name, number and categorization of PN ships, crafts, aircraft, and ground equipage dated April 2016. Based on this change, the ship's designation was changed from PF-11 to PS-11.

As of May 2010 she was part of the Philippine Navy contingent for the RP-US Balikatan 2010 exercises, and continued to operate from the Philippine Navy's main naval base at Cavite and visited the Navy Headquarters at Manila. She was assigned to the Patrol Force of the Philippine Fleet.

She then operated as a ceremonial ship to welcome foreign ships docking in Manila Bay. She was decommissioned on 15 March 2018 and was planned to be part of the Philippine Navy museum in Sangley Point. However, on 30 October 2022 she capsized and sank in a storm while moored at Cavite. The ship is half-submerged and berthed at the Philippine Navy's graveyard dock in Cavite, while awaiting final disposal, and like other retired ships, will be most likely sold for scrap due to her extremely-aged state.

== Technical details ==
=== Armaments ===
Although fairly well-armed, most of her weapon systems are manually operated and are of World War II origin.

The three Mk.22 3-inch/50-caliber guns, the ship's primary weapons, have a range of up to 14,600 yards (13,400 m) and are also capable of being used as limited anti-aircraft weapon. The guns were directed by a Mk.52 gun fire control system with a Mk.41 rangefinder, but this appears to be non-operational.

She also carries a total of three twin Mk.1 Bofors L/60 40 mm anti-aircraft guns directed individually by Mk.51 gun fire control system, six Mk.4 Oerlikon 20 mm cannon cannons, and four M2 Browning 50 caliber machine guns.

All anti-submarine weapons were removed as of 1996.

=== Machinery ===
The ship is powered by two EMD 16-645E7 turbo-blown diesel engines with a combined power of around 6,140 bhp (4,580 kW) driving two propellers. The main engines can propel the 1,620 ton (full load) ship at a maximum speed of around 18 knots (33 km/h). It has a range of 6,000 nautical miles (11,110 km) at a speed of 14 knots (26 km/h). It replaced the original four EMD 16-278A diesel engines during the ship's overhaul in 1996.

=== Electronics ===
The ship is equipped with a Raytheon AN/SPS-64(V)11 short range surface search and navigation radar and a Furuno navigation radar, replacing the SPS-5 surface search radar and the RCA/GE Mk.26 navigation radar. Previously equipped with an EDO AN/SQS-17B hull-mounted sonar, it is said to be deleted in 1996 due to lack of spare parts and obsolescence although it was reported to be still present in 2004.

== Notable operations ==
=== Deployments ===
On 17 June 2011 the Rajah Humabon was sent for patrols around the Scarborough Shoal after China announced that its biggest maritime patrol vessel, the Haixun 31, will be sent to the area on its way to Singapore.

=== International ===
On 2 February 2000, the Rajah Humabon fired warning shots at two Chinese fishing boats near Scarborough Shoal. According to Navy chief Vice Admiral Luisito Fernandez, the Rajah Humabon was forced to fire warning shots to avert a collision with two Chinese fishing boats and only after the Chinese boats refused to respond to radio contact, loudspeaker, sirens, and flashing lights.

On 22 June 2002, Rajah Humabon together with BRP Rizal visited Shanghai, China for a goodwill visit.

=== Exercises ===
The Rajah Humabon, together with BRP Leopoldo Regis (PG-847), BRP Dagupan City (LC-551), BRP Artemio Ricarte (PS-37), USS Essex (LHD-2), and USS Tortuga (LSD-46) were part of the naval component of the US-RP Balikatan 2009 bi-lateral exercises held in April 2009.

Again Rajah Humabon, together with BRP Dagupan City (LC-551), and BRP Apolinario Mabini (PS-36), USS Essex (LHD-2), and USS Denver (LPD-9) were part of the naval phase of the US-RP Balikatan 2010 (BK10) bi-lateral exercises held in March 2010.

On 14 to 16 August 2012, the Naval Forces Northern Luzon (NFNL) conducted a small-scale Naval Exercise code-named SAGEX 02–12 at the waters of South China Sea. BRP Rajah Humabon together with BRP Gregorio del Pilar and BRP Liberato Picar participated under Naval Task Force (NTF) 11. The exercise includes patrol, simulated tracking of targets and interdiction and capped by live firing exercises.

Rajah Humabon, together with BRP Gregorio del Pilar participated in the sea phase exercises with the US Navy during the Balikatan 2013 from 5 to 17 April 2013.

== Gallery ==
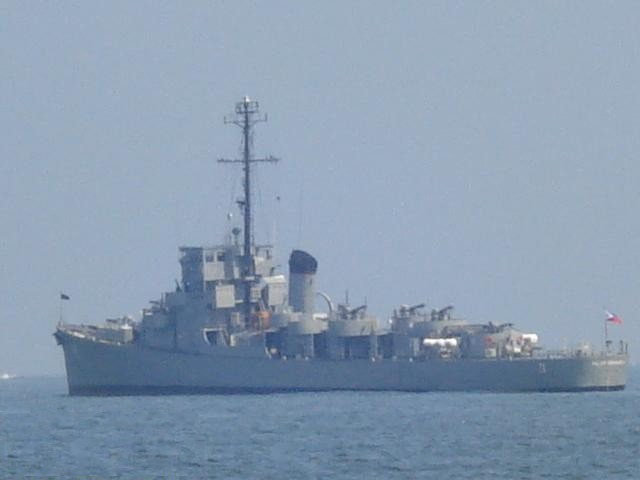
BRP Rajah Humabon anchored at Manila Bay on 19 May 2008

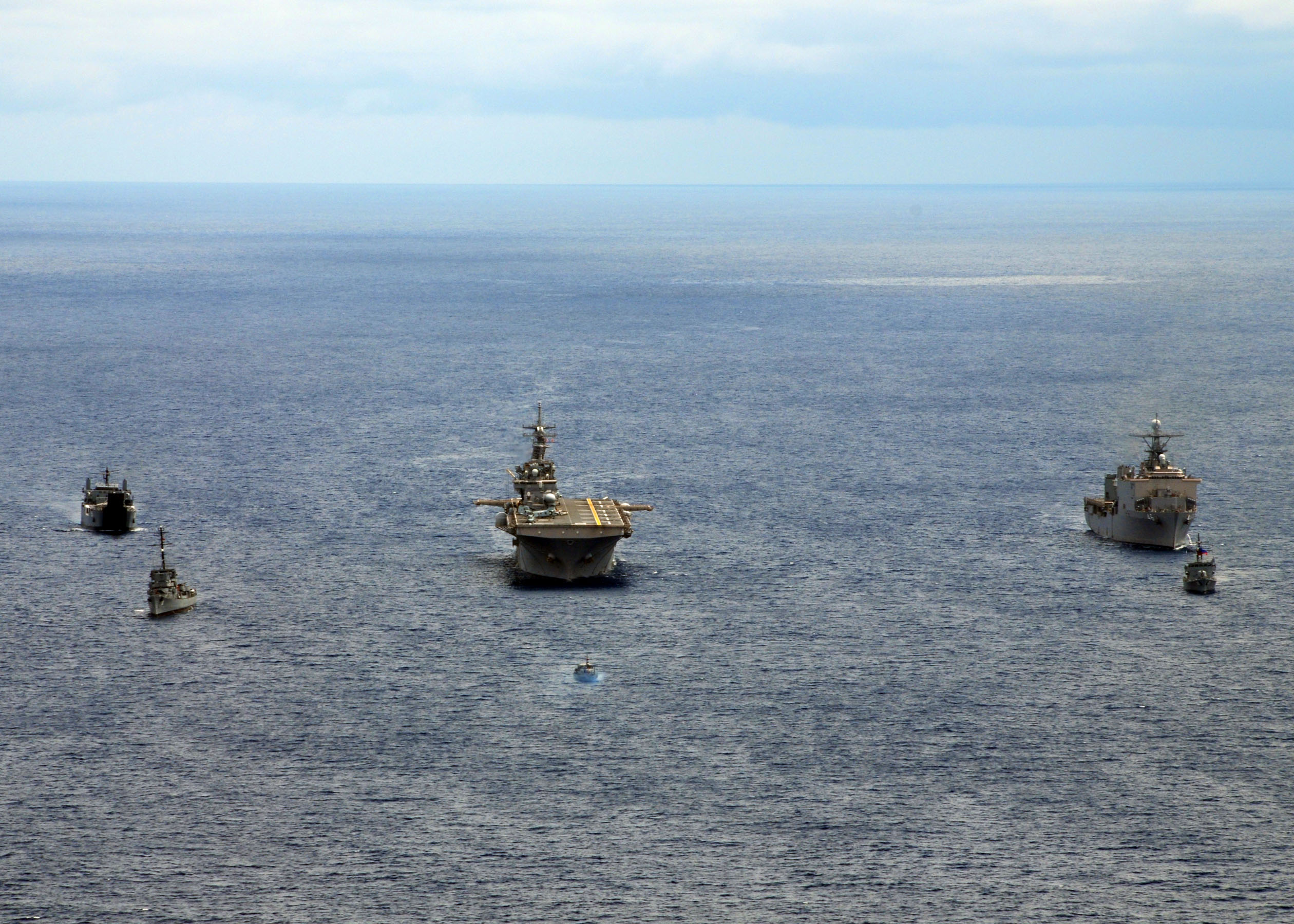
BRP Rajah Humabon, together with Philippine & U.S. Navy ships during naval phase of Balikatan 2009 bilateral exercises held in April 2009

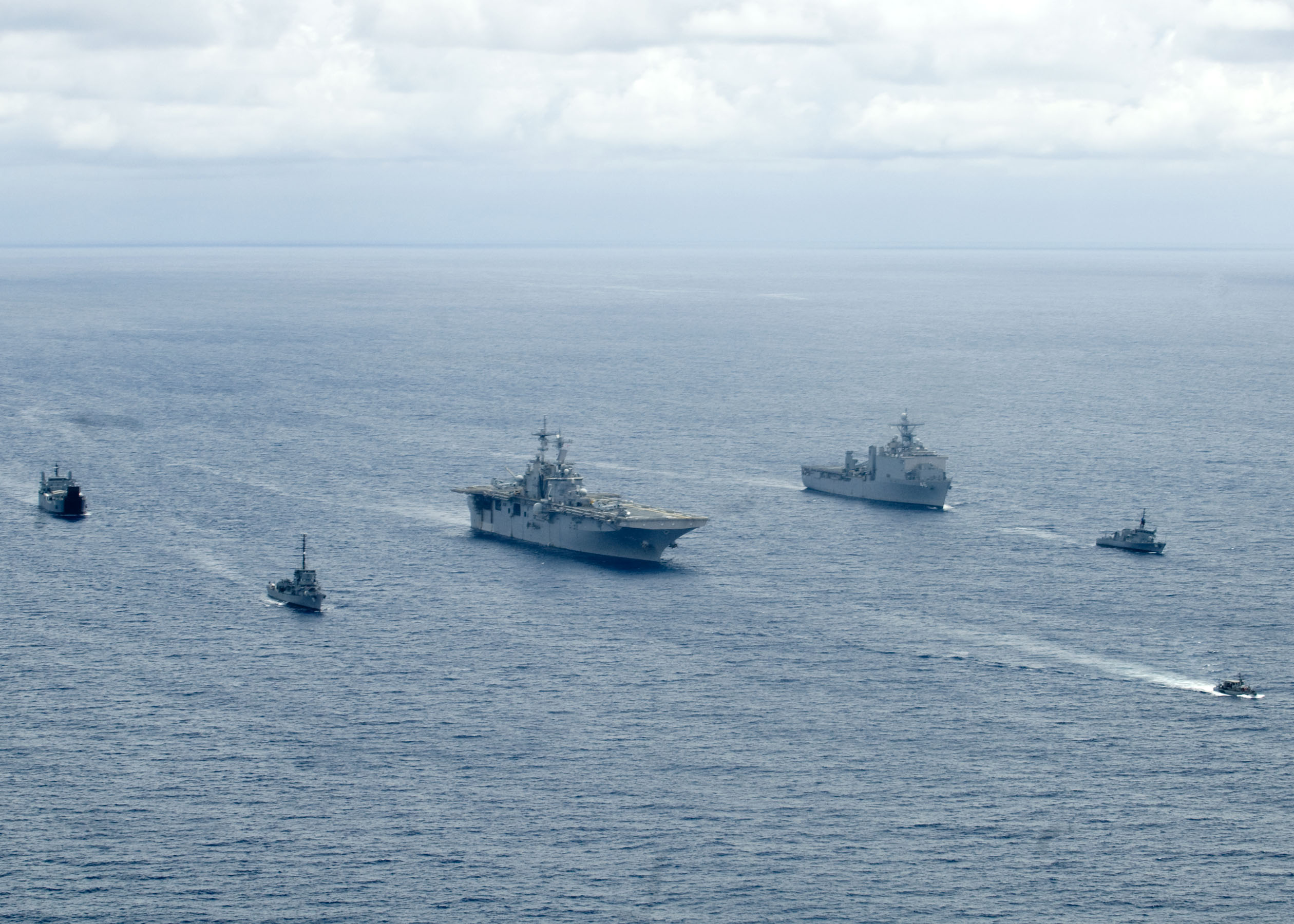
BRP Rajah Humabon during naval phase of Balikatan 2009 bilateral exercises, April 2009.

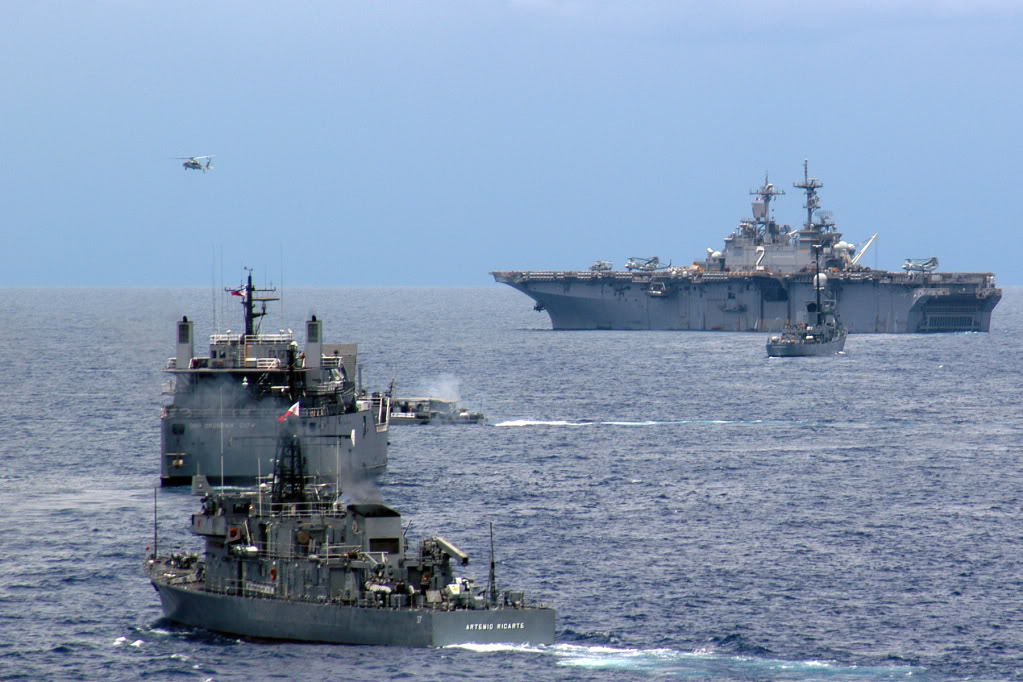
The forward-deployed amphibious assault ship USS Essex (LHD 2) leads ships formation during photo exercise (PHOTOEX) with Philippines Navy ships during Balikatan 2009 (BK09)

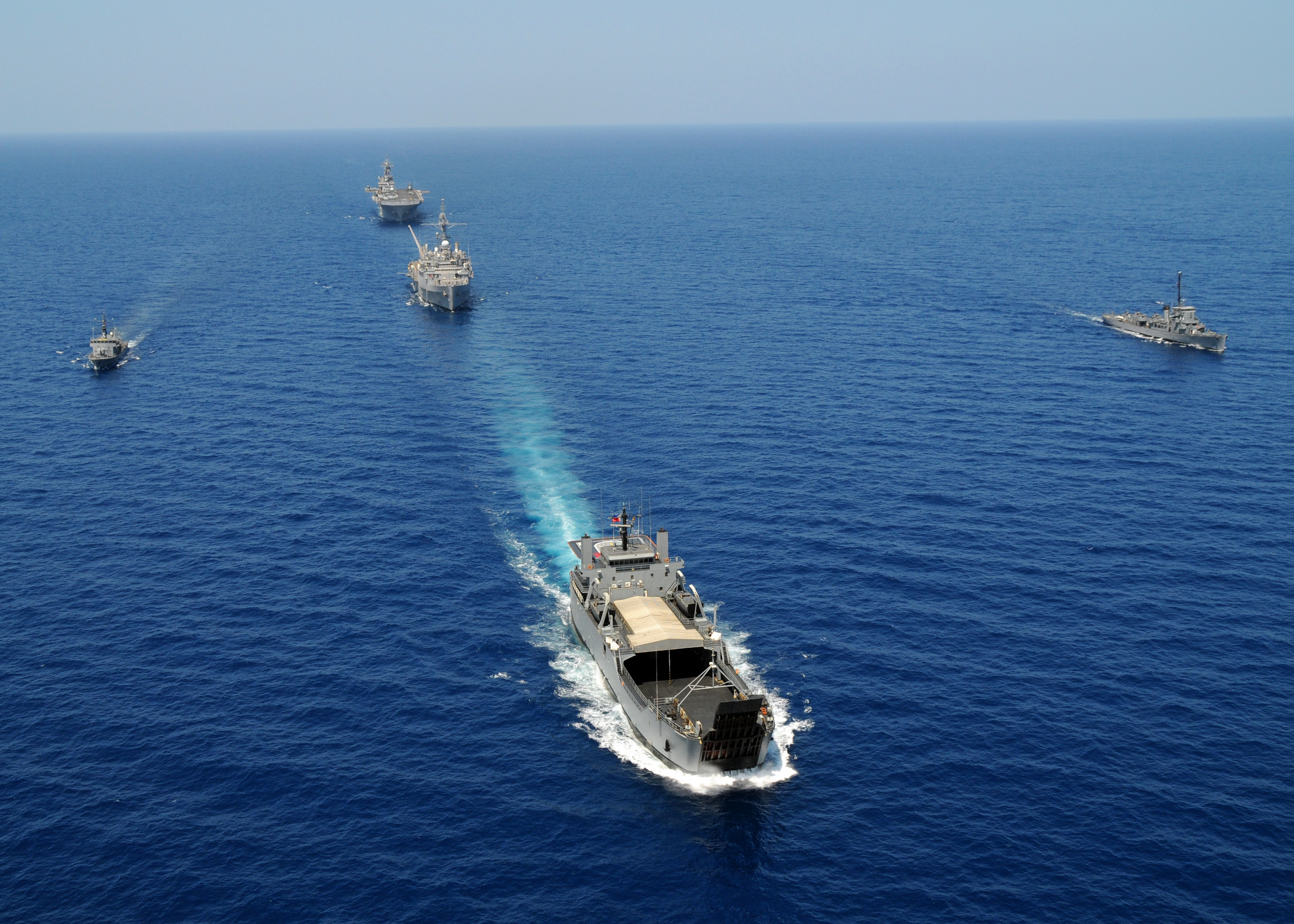
BRP Rajah Humabon (far right) together with other Philippine and US Ships during Balikatan 2010 sea-phase exercises (BK10)

== See also ==
- List of ships of the Philippine Navy
