= BRP Datu Sikatuna =

History

United States
- Name: Amick
- Ordered: 1942
- Builder: Federal Drydock & Shipbuilding Co.
- Laid down: 30 November 1942
- Launched: 27 May 1943
- Commissioned: 26 July 1943
- Decommissioned: 16 May 1947
- Stricken: 15 June 1978
- Fate: Transferred to JMSDF in 1955, reverted to US Navy in 1975. Transferred to Philippine Navy in 1976.

History

Japan
- Name: Asahi
- Namesake: The name Asahi means rising sun, which by extension is a metaphor for Japan.
- Operator: Japan Maritime Self-Defense Force
- Commissioned: 1955
- Decommissioned: 1975
- Fate: Reverted to US Navy in 1975.

History

Philippines
- Name: Datu Sikatuna
- Namesake: Datu Sikatuna was the chieftain of Bohol, who made a blood compact and allianced with the Spanish conquistador, Miguel López de Legazpi on 16 March 1565.
- Operator: Philippine Navy
- Acquired: 13 September 1976
- Commissioned: 27 February 1980
- Decommissioned: 1989
- Reclassified: BRP Datu Sikatuna (PF-5)
- Fate: Stricken and scrapped in 1989.

General characteristics
- Class & type: Datu Kalantiaw class
- Type: Destroyer Escort / Frigate
- Displacement: 1,240 tons standard, 1,620 tons full load
- Length: 306 ft (93 m)
- Beam: 36.66 ft (11.17 m)
- Draft: 8.75 ft (2.67 m) 8.75 ft
- Installed power: 6,000 hp (4,500 kW)
- Propulsion: 4 × GM 16-278A Main Diesel Engines; 2 × GM EMP 8-268A Auxiliary Diesel Engines with 200kW Generator; 1 × GM EMP 3-268A Auxiliary Diesel Engine with 100kW Generator; 2 shafts
- Speed: 21 knots (39 km/h; 24 mph) (maximum)
- Range: 10,800 mi (9,400 nmi; 17,400 km) at 12 knots (22 km/h; 14 mph)
- Sensors & processing systems: Raytheon SPS-5 G/H-band Surface Search Radar; RCA/GE Mk26 I-band Navigation Radar; AN/SQS-17B Hull mounted Sonar; Mk52 GFCS with Mk41 Rangefinder for 3 in. guns; 3 Mk51 GFCS for 40 mm guns
- Armament: 3 × 3"/50 caliber gun Mk.22 dual purpose guns; 1 × Mk.1 Twin L/60 Bofors 40 mm gun; 8 × Mk.4 Oerlikon 20 mm cannons; 3 × Mk.15 21" Torpedo Tubes; 1 × Mk.10 Hedgehog Projector (144 rounds); 8 × Mk.6 Depth Charge Projectors; 2 × Mk.9 Depth Charge Tracks

The BRP Datu Sikatuna (PF-5) was one of the three ex-USN Cannon-class destroyer escorts that served with the Philippine Navy, the others being BRP Datu Kalantiaw (PS-76) and BRP Rajah Humabon (PF-11).

== History ==
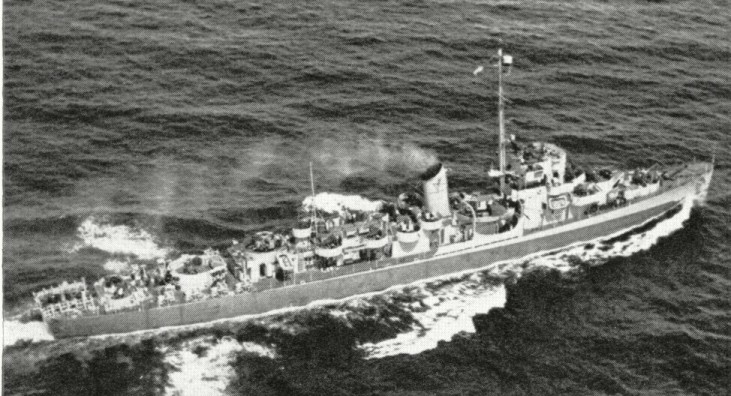
as USS Amick (DE-168)

Commissioned in the US Navy as the USS Amick (DE-168) in 1943, she was mostly assigned at the Atlantic theatre doing escort duties for transatlantic convoys. She served in the Pacific theatre in the middle of 1945, and received the unconditional surrender of all Japanese forces in the northern Palaus, which was received by the Americans in the wardroom on board Amick in September 1945. Amick was reassigned back to the Atlantic Fleet in December 1945 and remained in semi-active status until her decommissioning in May 1947.

=== Japan Maritime Self-Defense Force ===
She was transferred to the Japanese government as JDS Asahi (DE-262) on 14 June 1955. Together with her sistership JDS Hatsuhi (DE-263), they became one of the first warships of the newly organized Japan Maritime Self-Defense Force. As newer ships became available to the JMSDF, both ships were decommissioned and returned to the US Navy in June 1975.

=== Philippine Navy ===
Remained laid-up in Japan, she was transferred to the Philippine government on 13 September 1976 and was sold as Excess Defense Article on 23 December 1978. As a Philippine Navy ship, she was named RPS Datu Sikatuna (PS-77), and was towed to South Korea for an extensive refit in 1979. During this period South Korea also turned over 2 of their own ex-USN Cannon class ships to the US Navy in 1977, namely the Kyong Ki (DE-71) /USS Muir (DE-770) and Kang Won (DE-72) / USS Sutton (DE-771). These were also turned-over by the US to the Philippine government, which were later on cannibalized for use as parts hulk to upgrade and repair the Datu Sikatuna and her sistership Rajah Humabon, and provide both ships with additional guns and improve her machinery.

With these upgrades, she was formally commissioned to the Philippine Navy in 1980, and formed the backbone of the Philippine Fleet together with 2 of her sister ships and other ex-US Navy destroyer escorts. She was reclassified as BRP Datu Sikatuna (PF-5) in July 1980, now using the "BRP" ship naming standard and carrying a "Frigate" classification, and served until 1989, when she was decommissioned and scrapped. She became a parts hulk for the remaining ship of her class, the BRP Rajah Humabon (PF-11).
