= Battle of Point Judith =

Naval battle during the Second World War

- Part of World War II and Battle of the Atlantic
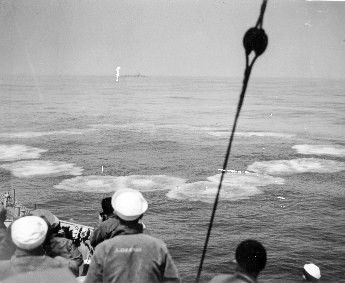
- Sailors aboard USS Moberly firing on U-853.
Date	May 5–6, 1945
Location	off Point Judith, Rhode Island 41.350°N 71.467°W
Result	United States victory

Belligerents
United States	Germany

Strength
Sea • Destroyer Ericsson • 2 Destroyer escorts USS Amick; USS Atherton • Frigate Moberly • SS Black Point; Air; 2 blimps	Submarine U-853

Casualties and losses
12 killed Black Point sunk	55 killed U-853 sunk

The Battle of Point Judith is the popular name for a naval engagement fought between the United States and Nazi Germany during World War II on May 5 and 6, 1945 - with Germany on the verge of total defeat and surrender, and Hitler having already committed suicide, American surface combatants and two blimps sank a German U-boat off Point Judith, Rhode Island in one of the last actions of the Battle of the Atlantic. The SS Black Point, a 368-foot, 7,500-ton coal ship, was sunk at the start of the Battle.

== Background ==
U-853 was one of five U-boats dispatched in February 1945 for operations off the North American coast. By May 1945, she was only one of the February boats remaining active and was one of just six U-boats operating off the North American coast. On May 6, she was patrolling the coast off Rhode Island.

The SS Black Point (originally named SS Fairmont) was built in 1918 by the New York Shipbuilding Corporation in Camden, New Jersey. The 5,353 ton collier ship was 112.35 meters long, with a beam of 16.82 meters and a draft of 9.3 meters. She was powered by 3 boilers that powered one 3-cylinder triple expansion engine that powered a single shaft to a single screw with 462 nhp. During World War I she served in the US Navy as the USS Fairmont. She was armed with one 6" deck gun and one 6-pounder deck gun. After WWI, she was renamed the SS Nebraskan by the C.H. Sprague & Son Corp. By WWII, she was known as the SS Black Point. On May 6 she was en route to Boston, Massachusetts with United States Navy Armed Guard onboard to protect the ship.

== Battle ==
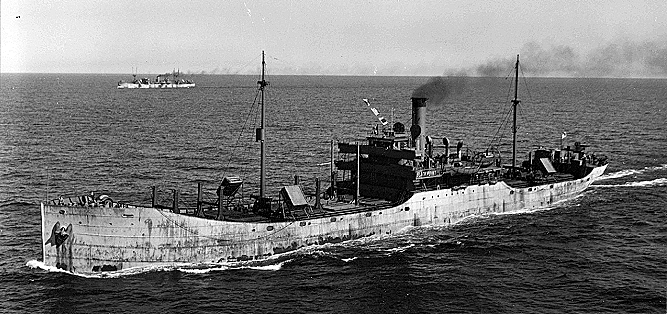
The Black Point on 22 September 1944.

President of the German Reich Karl Dönitz directed all U-boats to cease attacks on May 4, ahead of Germany's surrender. While most commanding officers obeyed this order, some either did not receive it or chose to ignore it.

On May 5, U-853 was lying in wait off Point Judith when she sighted the SS Black Point. Two torpedoes from the U-boat struck the Black Point; one blew off the stern of the ship. Within 15 minutes, the ship capsized and sank in 95 ft (29 m) of water. The SS Black Point would be the last American-flagged merchant ship to be sunk in WWII. Of those aboard, 11 crewmen and one Navy guard died; 34 others were rescued by nearby vessels.

A radio report about the torpedoing from one of the rescue ships, the SS Kamen, was picked up by US Navy's Eastern Sea Frontier command in New York and by the 1st Naval District in Boston. The nearest warships, which were under the command of Commander F. C. McCune, were part of Task Force 60.7 (TF60.7). The escort group consisted of destroyer USS Ericsson (Lt.Cdr CA Baldwin), destroyer escorts USS Amick (Lt.Cdr EL Barsumian) and Atherton (Lt.Cdr L Iselin ), and frigate USS Moberly (Lt.Cdr Tollaksen CG ). Ericsson was transiting the Cape Cod Canal with McCune on board when the summons came, so the remaining four ships headed for Kamen's location, with Tollaksen in temporary command. They had been en route to Boston after escorting Convoy GUS 84 to New York. With the news of the sinking, they were immediately ordered to start a search and destroy mission against the submarine.

When the first ships arrived at Point Judith at 19.30, they began sweeping the area with their late-war Sonar equipment. U-853 was discovered bottomed in 108 ft (33 m) of water just after midnight. After the warships had made their first attack, oil was sighted on the surface, sparking the first series of claims that the U-boat had been destroyed. However, the ships continued to find contacts, so the attacks continued. McCune resumed overall command when Ericsson arrived in the early hours of the morning. Amick was detached to make a pre-arranged rendezvous, and reinforcements arrived later, comprising the destroyers Barney, Breckinridge, and Blakeley, the frigate Newport, the corvettes Action and Restless, and the auxiliary destroyer Semmes. These took up position around the search site to guard against the U-boat's slipping past the attackers.

Attacks continued through the night. At 0530, oil, planking, life rafts, a chart tabletop, clothing, and an officer's cap were spotted on the surface. Nevertheless, destruction of U-853 was not accepted by the command of the 1st Naval District in Boston so the hunt continued. By daybreak, the K class blimps K-16 and K-58 from Lakehurst, New Jersey joined the attack, locating oil slicks and marking suspected locations with smoke and dye markers. K-16 also attacked with six 7.2 in (180 mm) rocket bombs. Finally at 1207 Eastern Sea Frontier in New York accepted the destruction of the U-boat and the hunt was ended.

== Wreck ==
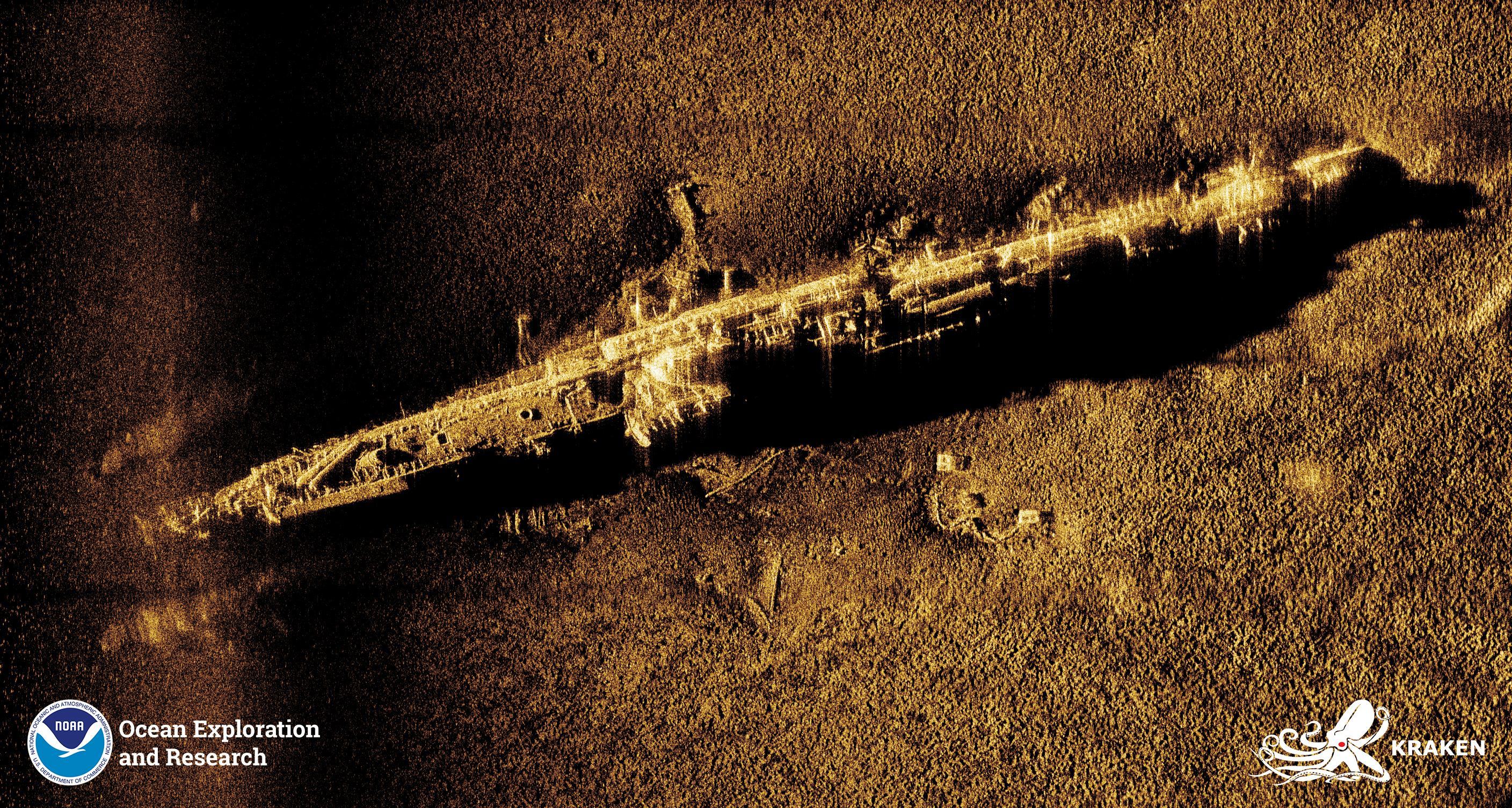
Synthetic aperture sonar imagery of the German submarine U-853.

Later that day, US Navy divers from USS Penguin located the wreck of U-853 at a depth of 40 m (130 ft). Battle damage consisted of two hits to the submarine's pressure hull resulting in the death of all its 55-man crew. Evidence showed the U-853 had been destroyed at some point between midnight and mid-day on 6 May. During the 17-hour hunt, the warships from TF60.7 had expended 264 Hedgehog bombs and 95 depth charges; at least one ship was damaged by the concussion from the ordnance exploding in shallow waters. Many of the later attacks made by TF60.7 were so-called "tin-opener attacks" against the U-boat wreck in order to gain evidence of its destruction.
