= USS Moberly =

Tacoma-class patrol frigate

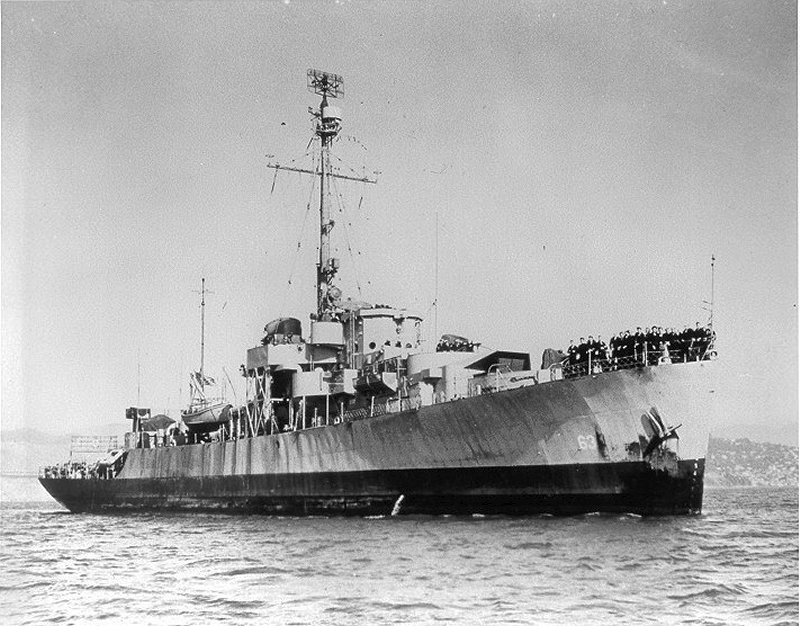
- USS Moberly (PF-63)

History

United States
- Name: Scranton (1943–1944); Moberly (1944–1947)
- Namesake: City of Scranton, Pennsylvania; City of Moberly, Missouri
- Reclassified: PF-63, 15 April 1943
- Builder: Globe Shipbuilding Company, Superior, Wisconsin
- Laid down: 3 November 1943
- Launched: 26 January 1944
- Renamed: Moberly, 28 June 1944
- Commissioned: 11 December 1944
- Decommissioned: 12 August 1946
- Stricken: 23 April 1947
- Honors and awards: 1 × battle star (World War II)
- Fate: Sold for scrapping, 27 October 1947

General characteristics
- Class & type: Tacoma-class frigate
- Displacement: 1,430 long tons (1,453 t) light; 2,415 long tons (2,454 t) full
- Length: 303 ft 11 in (92.63 m)
- Beam: 37 ft 6 in (11.43 m)
- Draft: 13 ft 8 in (4.17 m)
- Propulsion: 2 × 5,500 shp (4,101 kW) turbines; 3 boilers; 2 shafts
- Speed: 20 knots (37 km/h; 23 mph)
- Complement: 190
- Armament: 3 × 3"/50 dual purpose guns (3x1); 4 x 40 mm guns (2×2); 9 × 20 mm guns (9×1); 1 × Hedgehog anti-submarine mortar array; 8 × Y-gun depth charge projectors; 2 × Depth charge tracks

USS Moberly (PF-63), a Tacoma-class frigate, was the only ship of the United States Navy to be named for Moberly, Missouri.

== Construction ==
Moberly (PF-63), originally designated as PG-171, was reclassified PF-63 on 15 April 1943, laid down as Scranton under Maritime Commission contract by Globe Shipbuilding Company in Superior, Wisconsin, on 3 November 1943, launched on 26 January 1944, sponsored by Mrs Howard J Snowden. She was renamed Moberly on 28 June 1944, placed "in service" from 1 to 7 September, during transfer to Houston, Texas, for completion of construction by Brown Shipbuilding, and commissioned at Houston on 11 December 1944.

== Service history ==
After shakedown off Bermuda, Moberly reported to the Atlantic Fleet on 8 February 1945 for escort duty. Assigned to Task Group 60.01 (TG 60.1), she departed Norfolk, Virginia, 22 February in the screen of North African bound convoy UGS-76. She reached Oran, Algeria, 10 March, then sailed on the 18th with westbound convoy GUS-76. Transferred to TG-60.7 on 29 March, she joined the eastbound convoy UGS-82 in the mid-Atlantic and returned to Oran on 8 April. Once again, the frigate sailed for the United States on 17 April. The escorts left the convoy off New York about noon on 5 May and headed for Boston, Massachusetts.

In company with Atherton (DE-169) and Amick (DE-168), Moberly approached Buzzards Bay late that afternoon, only two days before Germany surrendered. At 18:54, on orders from CTG 60.7 in Ericsson (DD-440), then at the southern entrance to the Cape Cod Canal, the ships turned about to search for a German submarine off Block Island. At 1740, U-853 had torpedoed and sunk Black Point a 368-foot (112 m) collier within sight of Point Judith, Rhode Island as she headed to Boston.

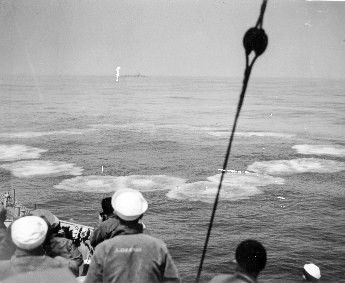
Moberly fires a spread of Hedgehog depth charges at U-853

The group reached the area at 19:20 and after forming a scout line off Block Island, they began a sweep seaward at 20:10. Within 15 minutes, Atherton detected a submarine snorkel and the destroyer escort dropped magnetic depth charges at 20:28, and during the next 30 minutes fired two Hedgehog pattens.

Working as a hunter-killer group, Atherton and Moberly continued the search and destroy operation. At 23:41 the escort launched another Hedgehog attack which brought large amounts of oil, air bubbles, and debris to the surface. The two ships delivered four more attacks in the early hours of 6 May and by dawn, oil and flotsam covered the area. The ships noted evidence of planking, life rafts, a chart tabletop, clothing and an officer's cap, which indicated success in the earlier attacks. To be certain, they continued the assault throughout the morning, then at 1240, TG 60.7 headed for Boston with "brooms at mastheads."

Moberly operated between Boston and New York until 31 July when she sailed with three other frigates for the Pacific. She transited the Panama Canal on 8 August and reached Pearl Harbor on the 23rd. Six days later Moberly and Gladwyne (PF-62) sailed for the Marshall Islands to begin weather station and plane guard patrols. The frigates reached Majuro on 5 September, and during the next six months they alternated on patrolling their assigned area out of Majuro and later out of Kwajalein.

Moberly returned to the west coast early in April 1946 and subsequently served in the 13th Naval District. She decommissioned on 12 August 1946. Authorized by the Secretary of the Navy for disposal on 29 August, Moberly was struck from the Navy list on 23 April 1947. She was sold for scrapping to Franklin Shipwrecking Company of Hillside, New Jersey, on 27 October 1947.

Moberly received one battle star for World War II service.

== Awards ==
- American Campaign Medal with one battle star
- European-African-Middle Eastern Campaign Medal
- Asiatic-Pacific Campaign Medal
- World War II Victory Medal
