= USS Gladwyne =

Tacoma-class patrol frigate

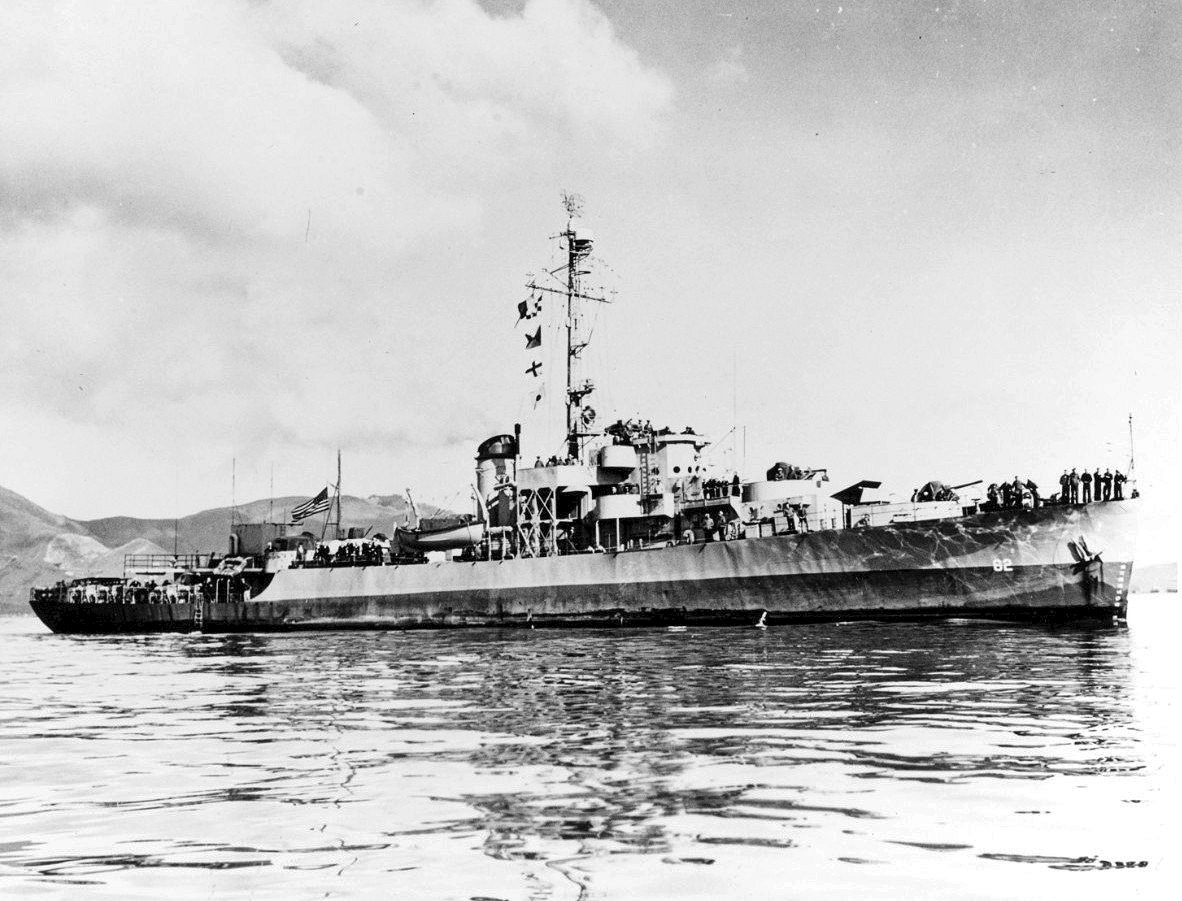
- Gladwyne in San Francisco Bay

History

United States
- Name: Worcester
- Namesake: City of Worcester, Massachusetts
- Reclassified: PF-62, 15 April 1943
- Builder: Globe Shipbuilding Company, Superior, Wisconsin
- Yard number: 116
- Laid down: 14 October 1943
- Launched: 7 January 1944
- Sponsored by: Mrs. Phyllis M. Bennett
- Renamed: Gladwyne
- Namesake: City of Gladwyne, Pennsylvania
- Commissioned: 21 November 1944
- Decommissioned: 15 April 1946
- Stricken: 8 October 1946
- Fate: Transferred to Mexican Navy, 24 November 1947

Mexico
- Name: Papaloapan
- Namesake: Papaloapan River
- Acquired: 24 November 1947
- Fate: Scrapped, 1965

General characteristics
- Class & type: Tacoma-class frigate
- Displacement: 1,430 long tons (1,453 t) light; 2,415 long tons (2,454 t) full
- Length: 303 ft 11 in (92.63 m)
- Beam: 37 ft 6 in (11.43 m)
- Draft: 13 ft 8 in (4.17 m)
- Propulsion: 2 × 5,500 shp (4,101 kW) turbines; 3 boilers; 2 shafts
- Speed: 20 knots (37 km/h; 23 mph)
- Complement: 190
- Armament: 3 × 3"/50 dual purpose guns (3x1); 4 x 40 mm guns (2×2); 9 × 20 mm guns (9×1); 1 × Hedgehog anti-submarine mortar; 8 × Y-gun depth charge projectors; 2 × Depth charge tracks

USS Gladwyne (PF-62), a Tacoma-class frigate, was the only ship of the United States Navy to be named for Gladwyne, Pennsylvania. Originally named Worcester after Worcester, Massachusetts, the name was changed in order to give it to new light cruiser USS Worcester (CL-144) then under construction.

== Construction ==
Gladwyne (PF-62), was launched on 7 January 1944, at the Globe Shipbuilding Company in Superior, Wisconsin, sponsored by Mrs. Phyllis M. Bennett; and commissioned on 21 November 1944.

== Service history ==
After shakedown, Gladwyne sailed from Philadelphia, Pennsylvania, on 21 January 1945, for Casco Bay, Maine, arriving there two days later. Following training exercises there, she made two round trip trans-Atlantic convoy escort voyages to Oran, Algeria, one each from New York and Norfolk, Virginia, from 6 February through 14 May 1945, returning to Boston, Massachusetts, each time. Refresher training at Casco Bay occupied June, and on 31 July, Gladwyne sailed from Boston via Panama to the Pacific.

On 29 August, Gladwyne and Moberly (PF-63) sailed for the Marshall Islands to begin weather station and plane guard patrols. The frigates reached Majuro on 5 September, and during the next months they alternated on patrolling their assigned area out of Majuro and later out of Kwajalein. Gladwyne then sailed to Pearl Harbor putting in there on 27 December 1945. Underway again on 23 February 1946, Gladwyne returned to Majuro and patrolled on weather station until mooring at San Francisco, California, on 9 April.

Decommissioned there on 15 April 1946, she was stricken from the Navy List on 8 October 1946 and sold to the Mexican Government on 24 November 1947. She served Mexico as ARM Papaloapan until disposed of in 1965.
