= USS Booth =

Cannon-class destroyer escort

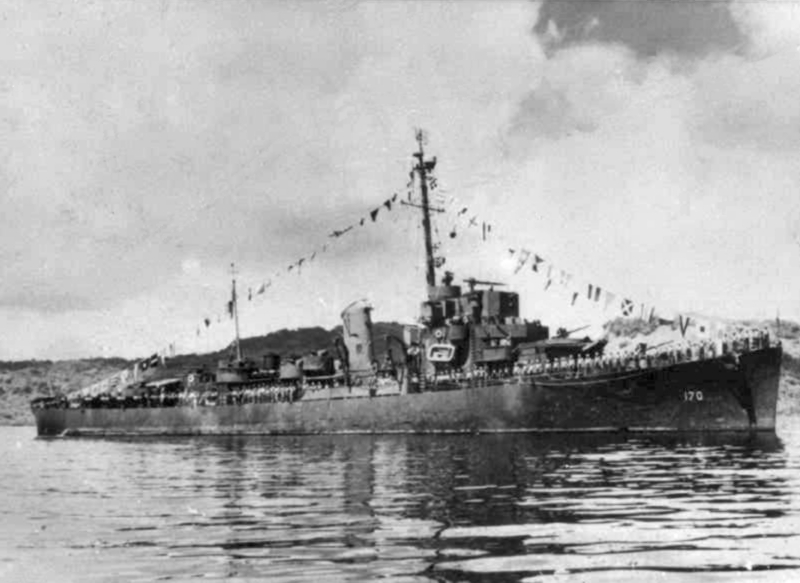

History

United States
- Name: USS Booth
- Namesake: Ensign Robert Sinclair Booth
- Builder: Federal Shipbuilding and Drydock Company, Newark, New Jersey
- Laid down: 30 January 1943
- Launched: 21 June 1943
- Commissioned: 19 September 1943
- Decommissioned: 14 June 1946
- Reclassified: FF-170, 30 June 1975
- Stricken: 15 July 1978
- Fate: Transferred to the Philippines, 15 December 1967

Philippines
- Name: Datu Kalantiaw
- Commissioned: 15 December 1967
- Fate: Lost during Typhoon Clara, 21 September 1981, 19.39017440035165°N 121.39150737073103°E

General characteristics
- Class & type: Cannon-class destroyer escort
- Displacement: 1,240 long tons (1,260 t) standard; 1,620 long tons (1,646 t) full
- Length: 306 ft (93 m) o/a; 300 ft (91 m) w/l
- Beam: 36 ft 10 in (11.23 m)
- Draft: 11 ft 8 in (3.56 m)
- Propulsion: 4 × GM Mod. 16-278A diesel engines with electric drive, 6,000 shp (4,474 kW), 2 screws
- Speed: 21 knots (39 km/h; 24 mph)
- Range: 10,800 nmi (20,000 km) at 12 kn (22 km/h; 14 mph)
- Complement: 15 officers and 201 enlisted
- Armament: 3 single × Mk.22 3-inch/50-caliber guns; 1 × twin 40 mm Mk.1 AA gun; 8 × 20 mm Mk.4 AA guns; 3 × 21 inch (533 mm) torpedo tubes; 1 × Hedgehog Mk.10 anti-submarine mortar (144 rounds); 8 × Mk.6 depth charge projectors; 2 × Mk.9 depth charge tracks

USS Booth (DE-170) was a Cannon-class destroyer escort built for the United States Navy during World War II. She served in the Atlantic Ocean and then the Pacific Ocean and provided escort service against submarine and air attack for Navy vessels and convoys.

She was laid down on 30 January 1943 at Newark, New Jersey, by the Federal Shipbuilding and Drydock Co.; launched on 21 June 1943; named for Ensign Robert Sinclair Booth, who was assigned to USS Arizona at Pearl Harbor, the first Washington, DC serviceman to die in the war; sponsored by Mrs. Annie L. Booth; towed by ocean-going tug Sagamore from her building yard to Norfolk, Virginia, via the Cape Cod Canal (24–26 June 1943), completed at the Norfolk Navy Yard; and commissioned there on 18 September 1943.

== World War II Atlantic Ocean operations ==
After fitting out, Booth put to sea from Hampton Roads, Virginia, on 14 October 1943 for her shakedown. The destroyer escort returned to Norfolk from the Bermuda area on 13 November and entered the navy yard for post-shakedown availability. From 1 December to the 17th, she was at Washington, D.C., taking part in experimental work at the Naval Research Laboratory at Bellevue and the Washington Navy Yard. During the latter part of the month, Booth helped to train prospective destroyer escort crews in the Hampton Roads area.

At the beginning of 1944, the warship's division, Escort Division (CortDiv) 15, became a part of Task Force (TF) 62. Over the next 16 months, Booth and her division mates completed eight round-trip voyages to the Mediterranean and back escorting UGS (Slow Eastbound) and GUS (Slow Westbound) convoys, and she logged Gibraltar, Casablanca, Bizerte, Palermo, and Oran, as eastern termini. Though she investigated a number of sound contacts for possible enemy submarines, her only verifiable scrape with the Germans came from the air when planes attacked Convoy UGS-48 off Cape Bengut, Algeria, on the night of 1 August 1944. The convoy's anti-aircraft gunners repulsed the attack quickly, and none of the ships in the convoy suffered any damage.

== World War II Pacific Theatre operations ==
With the end of the war in Europe in May 1945, Booth began preparations for service in the Pacific theater. After a week of training near Guantánamo Bay, Cuba, the destroyer escort set course for the Panama Canal. She transited the isthmian waterway on 10 June and, after visiting San Diego and San Francisco, California, departed the latter port on 26 June. The warship escorted motor vessel MV Permanente to Pearl Harbor, arriving there on 2 July.

Booth then trained in the Hawaiian Islands for almost two weeks before getting underway on the 15th to proceed Eniwetok, in the Marshall Islands, for the Marianas. She arrived at Saipan on 26 July. After making one round-trip convoy escort mission between Saipan and Iwo Jima with convoys SIW-62 and IWS-54, Booth put to sea on 9 August for Ulithi Atoll, Caroline Islands. She reported in at Ulithi the following day and, on the 12th, embarked upon the first of two convoy runs to Okinawa, beginning with convoy UOK-47 and returning with OKU-20. On the same day the surrender document was being executed on board USS Missouri in Tokyo Bay (2 September), Booth was getting underway at Okinawa to return to Ulithi with convoy OKU-25 (her Okinawa-bound leg having been with UOK-52) from the second of those convoy screening missions.

== End-of-War Occupation Duties ==
During the autumn of 1945, Booth assisted occupation forces in accepting the surrender of bypassed islands and in repatriating their garrisons. On 8 September 1945, she set out from Ulithi with Lt. Kumura Fumio and Cpl. Kanichi Suzuki, representatives of the Imperial Japanese Army, embarked, to investigate Japanese installations and activities on Sorol Island, in the Western Carolines. Manning her 3-inch and 40-millimeter guns, Booth put ashore a landing party under Comdr. J.W. Buxton later that day, recovering the men a little over two hours later. The destroyer escort put the landing party ashore on Sorol again the following morning, recovering them soon thereafter and moving on to proceed toward Eauripik Island, arriving there the following day to put a force ashore to reconnoiter the island. After recovering her men shortly before noon, Booth arrived off Ifalik Island that afternoon. Her landing party visited that island during the day on 11 September, and then returned to Ulithi the following day (12 September).

On 11 October, Booth put to sea with Lt. Col. Lyman D. Spurlock, USMC (who was relieved by Maj. Robert J. J. Picardi on 30 October), and party, on a four-week assignment evacuating Japanese forces from Truk, Nomoi, and Puluwat atolls and preparing those places for the arrival of U.S. occupation forces. The warship arrived at Guam on 7 November but returned to sea the following day bound for the United States with 2 officers and 45 enlisted marines for transportation.

== Post-War decommissioning ==
Steaming via Pearl Harbor, San Diego, and the Panama Canal, the destroyer escort arrived in Green Cove Springs, Florida, on 28 January 1946, where she was decommissioned on 14 June 1946. Towed from Mayport, Florida, to Charleston, South Carolina, by the auxiliary ocean tug Tunica (10–11 April 1947) Booth was placed in "deferred disposal status pending possible transfer to a foreign government" on 7 July 1947, and two days later was towed back to Mayport by ATA-209, where the former convoy escort was inactivated on 28 July 1947.

== Booth converted to Datu Kalantiaw (PS-76) ==
Booth's "possible transfer to [a] foreign government" ultimately came to pass. Reconditioned by the Brewer Dry Dock Co., Staten Island, New York, the ship was loaned to the Republic of the Philippines under the Military Assistance Program on 15 December 1967. The Philippine Navy commissioned her on that day at the Philadelphia Navy Yard as BRP Datu Kalantiaw (PS-76). On 30 June 1975, while she was still operating on loan under a foreign flag, the destroyer escort was re-designated a frigate, FF-170. Subsequently, given the Philippine Navy's continuing need for the ship "in the interest of National Defense Requirements and in the furtherance of the Security Alliance between the [Philippines] and the United States," the U.S. Navy disposed of her by Foreign Military Sale and Booth was stricken from the Naval Vessel Register on 15 July 1978.

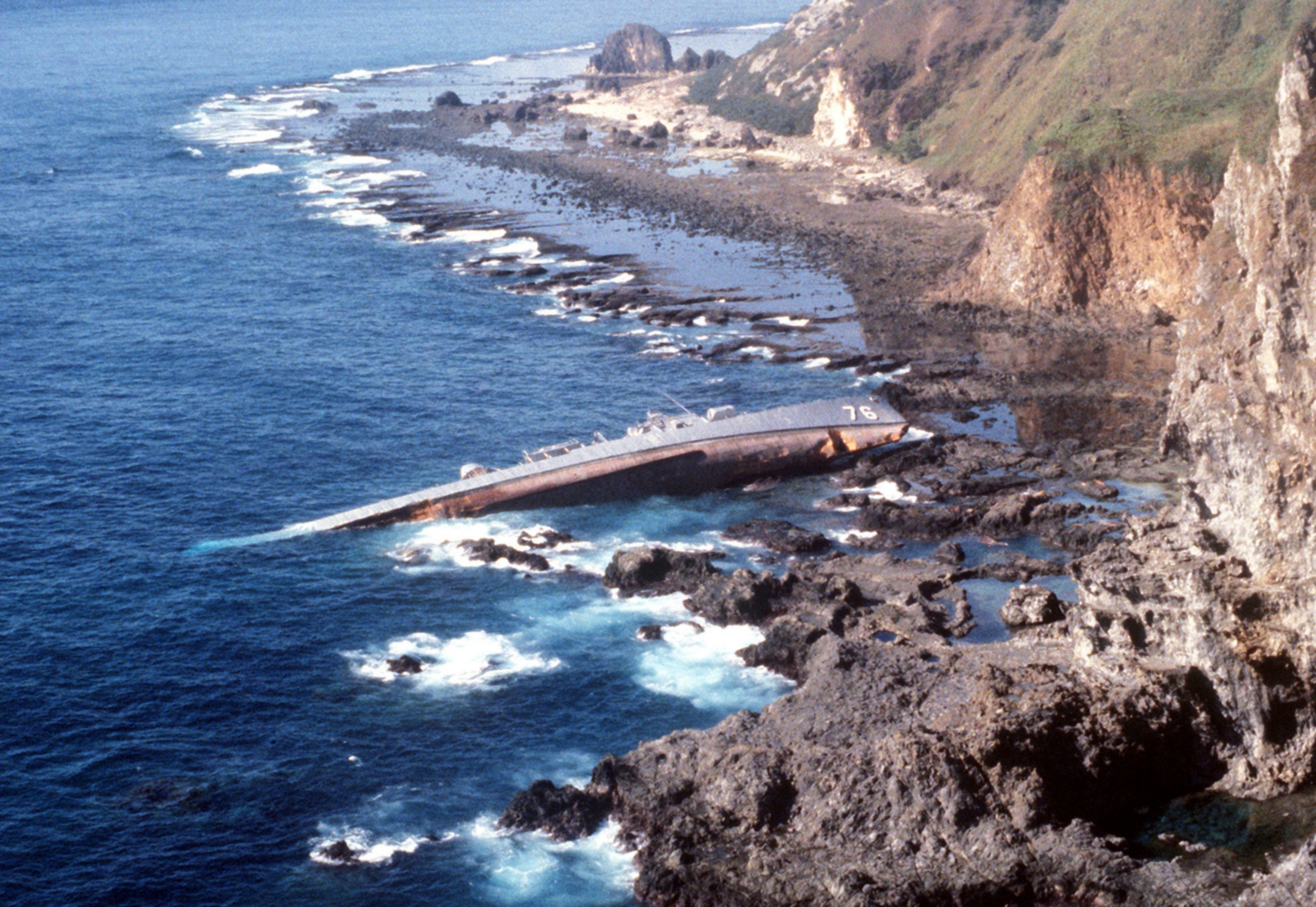
The foundered Datu Kalantiaw on the coast of Calayan Island, 1981.

Datu Kalantiaw continued to serve under the Philippine flag until Typhoon Clara drove her aground on 21 September 1981 on the rocky northern shore of Calayan Island, in the northern Philippines. The ammunition ship USS Mount Hood, as she neared Subic Bay that day, slated for a period of upkeep, received orders to "get underway again that evening to coordinate rescue operations" at the scene of the tragedy. Consequently, Mount Hood, working in concert with Philippine Navy units "in a most adverse weather environment," retrieved 49 bodies in two days of operations, and ultimately sailed for Manila to turn them over to Philippine authorities, rescuers no longer hearing tapping from inside the ship that lay on her beam ends where Clara had cast her. Soon thereafter, Rear Admiral Simeon Alejandro, Flag Officer in Command of the Philippine Navy, "made an emotional address to the officers and men of Mount Hood upon the ship's arrival on Manila," the auxiliary's historian records, "thanking each man for his part in the mission and offering the gratitude of the Philippine nation to the Captain and crew." One contemporary account called the loss of Datu Kalantiaw "one of the worst disasters in the history of the Philippine Navy," 79 of the 97-man crew perishing.
