= Point Judith, Rhode Island =

Village in Rhode Island, US

Coordinates: 41.3615°N 71.48139°W

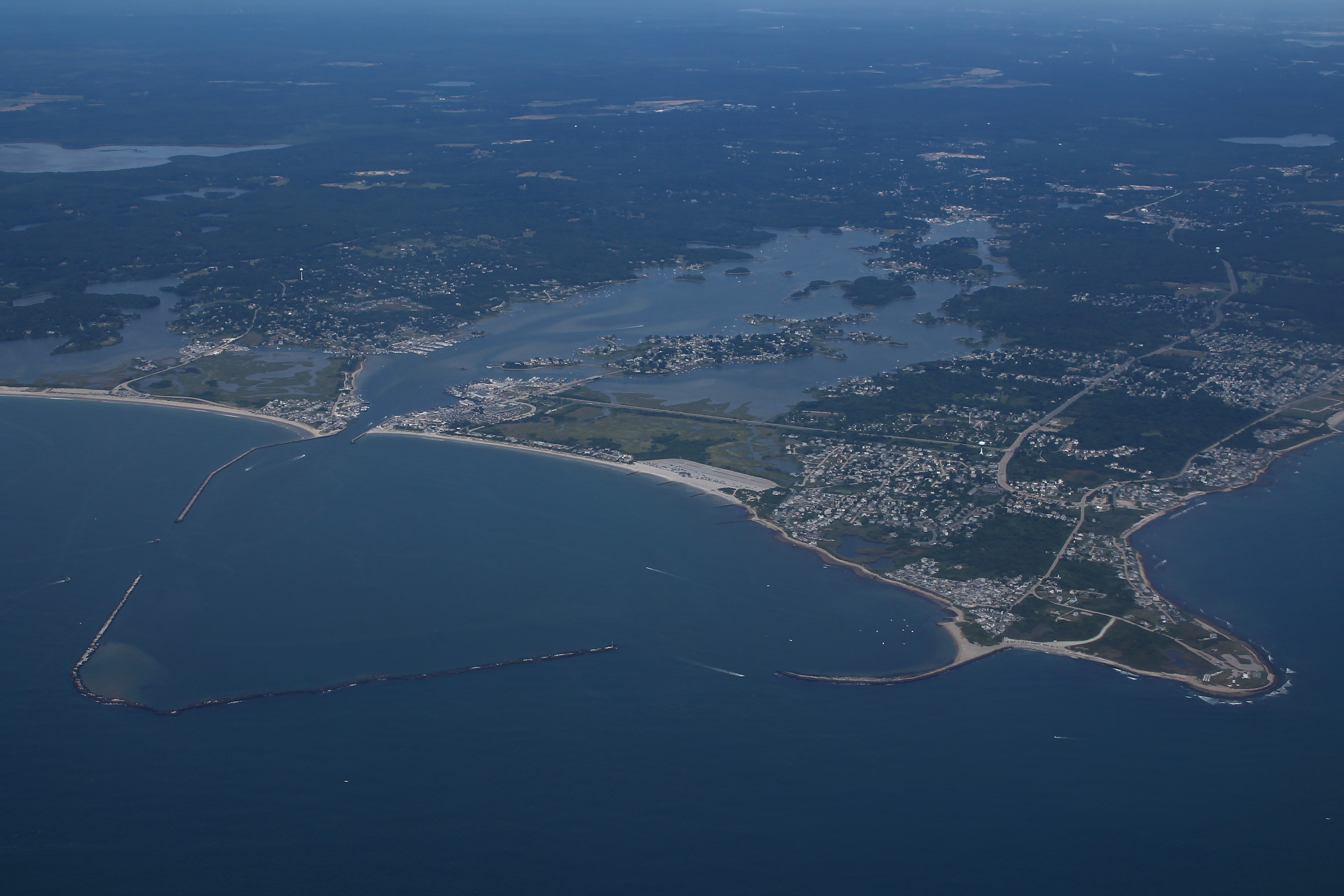
Aerial view of Point Judith

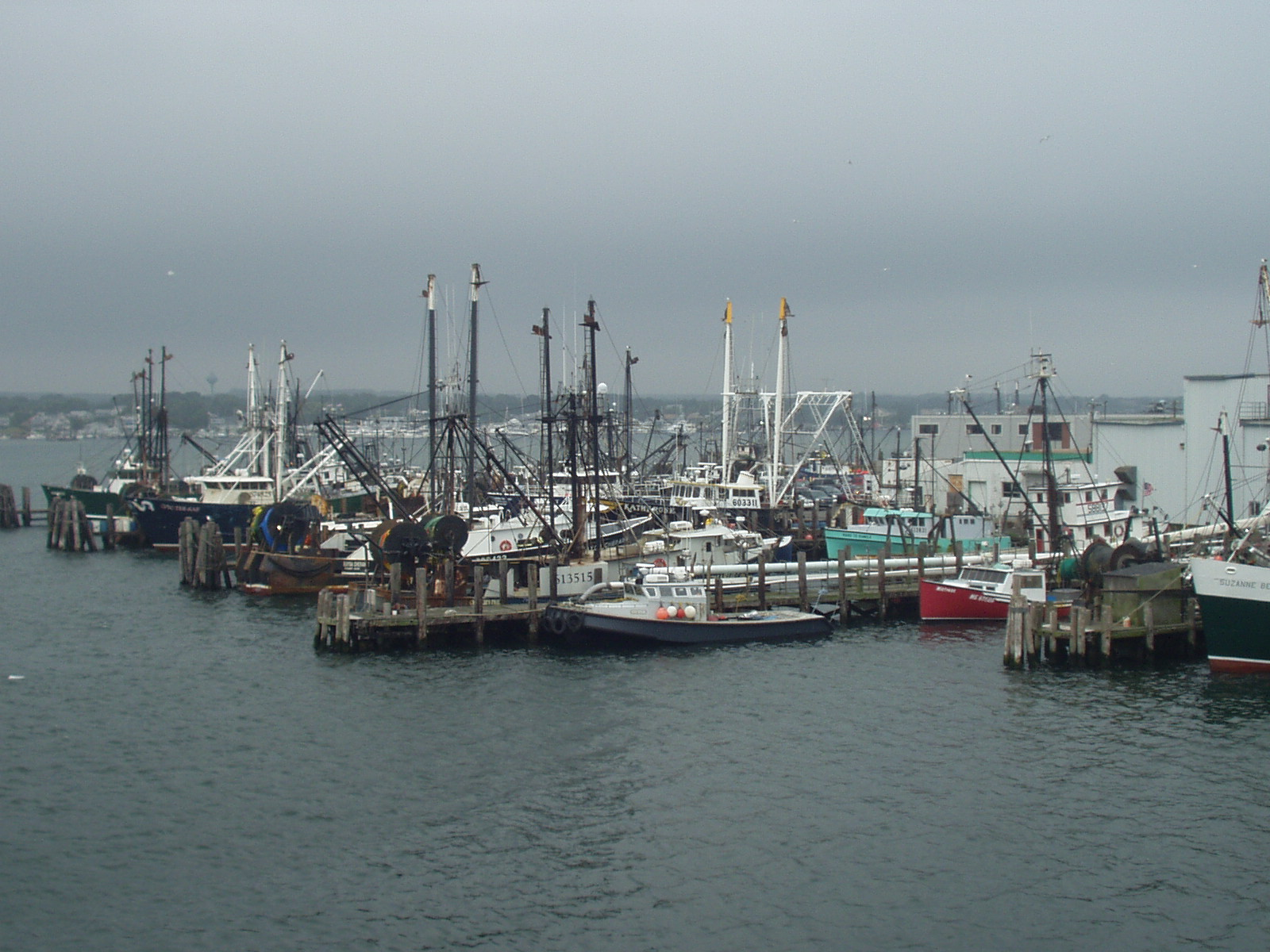
View from Point Judith ferry dock

Point Judith is a village and a small cape, on the coast of Narragansett, Rhode Island, United States, on the western side of Narragansett Bay where it opens out onto Rhode Island Sound. It is the location for the year-round ferry service that connects Block Island to the mainland and contains the fishing hamlet of Galilee.

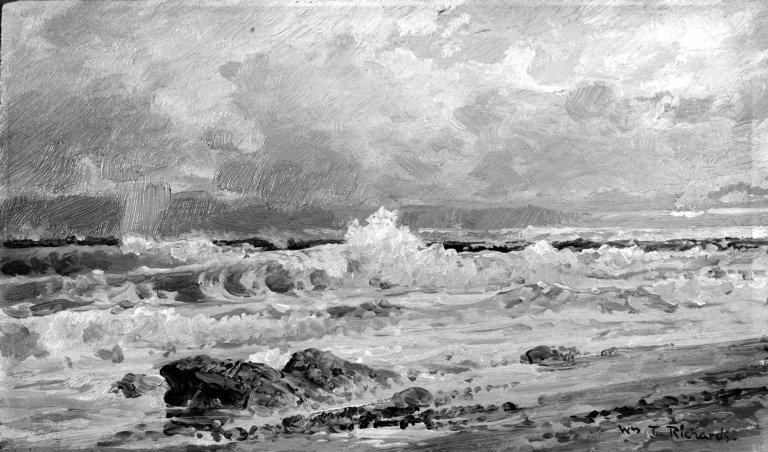
Point Judith by William Trost Richards

== History ==
Point Judith was either named for Judith Thatcher or Judith Hull. Judith Thatcher was a passenger on a small vessel with her father when it ran aground on the point and was almost wrecked. Judith is said to have rendered great service and as a result the vessel was saved. In remembrance of this the crew called the point after her name. According to Edmund Quincy's 1874 biography of his father Josiah Quincy, Point Judith was named after Judith Hull by her husband John Hull.

In the mid-17th Century Point Judith was mined by Hull in the search for "black lead", hoping to find silver. Hull was the treasurer and minted coinage for the Massachusetts Bay Colony. Unsuccessful with this endeavor, Hull established a business to raise coach horses for sale within New England but also for plantations in Virginia and Barbados.

During the American Revolution, the British controlled Narragansett Bay and raided and burned the farms on Point Judith and the surrounding areas in the late 1770s under Captain Wallace.

During World War II, Fort Greene was built with 16-inch guns and others to control the approaches to Narragansett Bay.

Point Judith is the site of the last sinking of an Allied ship in the Atlantic Ocean during World War II. On May 5, 1945, at 05:40, the German submarine U-853 torpedoed the collier, SS Black Point, en route to Boston, She was within sight of the United States Coast Guard lighthouse station at Point Judith. The lookout at the lighthouse was just preparing to enter the sighting in his logbook when he heard the sound of the torpedo exploding as it hit the ship. Black Point sank within twenty-five minutes. Twelve lives were lost among her crew, while thirty-four survivors were rescued. The resulting United States Navy and Coast Guard hunt for the U-853 is now often referred to as the Battle of Point Judith. A United States Navy frigate, destroyers, destroyer escorts, and Coast Guard cutters converged on the waters off Point Judith. Attacks with depth charges and hedgehogs continued until the U-853's destruction was confirmed the next morning by two blimps which dropped a few bombs on the Germans. U-853 may have been the last U-boat to sink a ship during World War II, but she also became the second to last one to be sunk. Her wreck lies in 135 feet of water and is a popular, but dangerous destination for sport divers; at least three divers have been killed there. U-853 is recognized as a war grave with most of the 55 crew bodies remaining inside.

== See also ==
- Point Judith Light
- Galilee, Rhode Island
- Jerusalem, Rhode Island
