= German submarine U-853 =

German World War II submarine

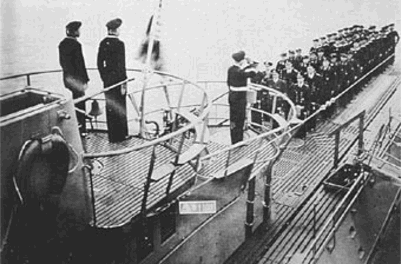
- U-853 and crew

History

Nazi Germany
- Name: U-853
- Ordered: 5 June 1941
- Builder: DeSchiMAG AG Weser, Bremen
- Yard number: 1059
- Laid down: 21 August 1942
- Launched: 11 March 1943
- Commissioned: 25 June 1943
- Nickname(s): der Seiltänzer ("the Tightrope Walker")
- Fate: Sunk in Battle of Point Judith on 6 May 1945

General characteristics
- Class & type: Type IXC/40 submarine
- Displacement: 1,144 t (1,126 long tons) surfaced; 1,257 t (1,237 long tons) submerged
- Length: 76.76 m (251 ft 10 in) o/a; 58.75 m (192 ft 9 in) pressure hull
- Beam: 6.86 m (22 ft 6 in) o/a; 4.44 m (14 ft 7 in) pressure hull
- Height: 9.60 m (31 ft 6 in)
- Draught: 4.67 m (15 ft 4 in)
- Installed power: 4,400 PS (3,200 kW; 4,300 bhp) (diesels); 1,000 PS (740 kW; 990 shp) (electric)
- Propulsion: 2 shafts; 2 × diesel engines; 2 × electric motors
- Speed: 18.3 knots (33.9 km/h; 21.1 mph) surfaced; 7.3 knots (13.5 km/h; 8.4 mph) submerged
- Range: 13,850 nmi (25,650 km; 15,940 mi) at 10 knots (19 km/h; 12 mph) surfaced; 63 nmi (117 km; 72 mi) at 4 knots (7.4 km/h; 4.6 mph) submerged
- Test depth: 230 m (750 ft)
- Complement: 4 officers, 44 enlisted
- Armament: 6 × torpedo tubes (4 bow, 2 stern); 22 × 53.3 cm (21 in) torpedoes; 1 × 10.5 cm (4.1 in) SK C/32 deck gun (180 rounds); 1 × 3.7 cm (1.5 in) SK C/30 AA gun; 1 × twin 2 cm FlaK 30 AA guns

Service record
- Part of: 4th U-boat Flotilla; 25 June 1943 – 31 March 1944; 10th U-boat Flotilla; 1 April – 1 October 1944; 33rd U-boat Flotilla; 1 October 1944 – 6 May 1945
- Commanders: Kptlt. Helmut Sommer; 25 June 1943 – 9 July 1944; Oblt.z.S. Helmut Frömsdorf (acting); 18 June – 9 July 1944; Oblt.z.S. Otto Wermuth; 10 July – 31 August 1944; K.Kapt. Günter Kuhnke; 24 August – 15 October 1944; Oblt.z.S. Helmut Frömsdorf; 1 September 1944 – 6 May 1945
- Operations: 3 patrols: 1st patrol: 29 April – 4 July 1944; 2nd patrol: a. 27 August – 14 October 1944; b. 6 – 11 February 1945; c. 14 – 17 February 1945; 3rd patrol: 23 February – 6 May 1945
- Victories: 1 merchant ship sunk (5,353 GRT); 1 warship sunk (430 tons)

German submarine U-853 was a Type IXC/40 U-boat of Nazi Germany's Kriegsmarine during World War II. Her keel was laid down on 21 August 1942 by DeSchiMAG AG Weser of Bremen. She was commissioned on 25 June 1943 with Kapitänleutnant Helmut Sommer in command. U-853 saw action during the Battle of the Atlantic in World War II. She conducted three patrols, sinking two ships totalling 5,353 GRT and 430 tons.

On her final patrol, U-853 was sent to harass United States coastal shipping. She destroyed USS Eagle 56 near Portland, Maine. Just days before Germany's surrender, U-853 torpedoed and sank the collier Black Point during the Battle of Point Judith. The day before Germany surrendered, American warships quickly found U-853 and sank her 7 nmi (13 km; 8.1 mi) east of Block Island, Rhode Island, resulting in the loss of her entire crew.

The submerged U-853 rests in 121 feet (37 m) of water and the site is a popular deep sea diving site.

== Design ==
German Type IXC/40 submarines were slightly larger than the original Type IXCs. U-853 had a displacement of 1,144 tonnes (1,126 long tons) when at the surface and 1,257 tonnes (1,237 long tons) while submerged. The U-boat had a total length of 76.76 m (251 ft 10 in), a pressure hull length of 58.75 m (192 ft 9 in), a beam of 6.86 m (22 ft 6 in), a height of 9.60 m (31 ft 6 in), and a draught of 4.67 m (15 ft 4 in). The submarine was powered by two MAN M 9 V 40/46 supercharged four-stroke, nine-cylinder diesel engines producing a total of 4,400 metric horsepower (3,240 kW; 4,340 shp) for use while surfaced, two Siemens-Schuckert 2 GU 345/34 double-acting electric motors producing a total of 1,000 shaft horsepower (1,010 PS; 750 kW) for use while submerged. She had two shafts and two 1.92 m (6 ft) propellers. The boat was capable of operating at depths of up to 230 metres (750 ft).

The submarine had a maximum surface speed of 18.3 knots (33.9 km/h; 21.1 mph) and a maximum submerged speed of 7.3 knots (13.5 km/h; 8.4 mph). When submerged, the boat could operate for 63 nautical miles (117 km; 72 mi) at 4 knots (7.4 km/h; 4.6 mph); when surfaced, she could travel 13,850 nautical miles (25,650 km; 15,940 mi) at 10 knots (19 km/h; 12 mph). U-853 was fitted with six 53.3 cm (21 in) torpedo tubes (four fitted at the bow and two at the stern), 22 torpedoes, one 10.5 cm (4.13 in) SK C/32 naval gun, 180 rounds, and a 3.7 cm (1.5 in) SK C/30 as well as a 2 cm (0.79 in) C/30 anti-aircraft gun. The boat had a complement of forty-eight.

== Armament ==
=== FLAK weaponry ===
U-853 was armed with a single 3.7 cm Flakzwilling M43U gun on the LM 42U mount. The LM 42U mount was the most common mount used with the 3.7 cm Flak M42U. The 3.7 cm Flak M42U was the marine version of the 3.7 cm Flak used by the Kriegsmarine on Type VII and Type IX U-boats. U-853 had two 2cm Flak C38 in a M 43U Zwilling mount with short folding shield mounted on the upper Wintergarten.

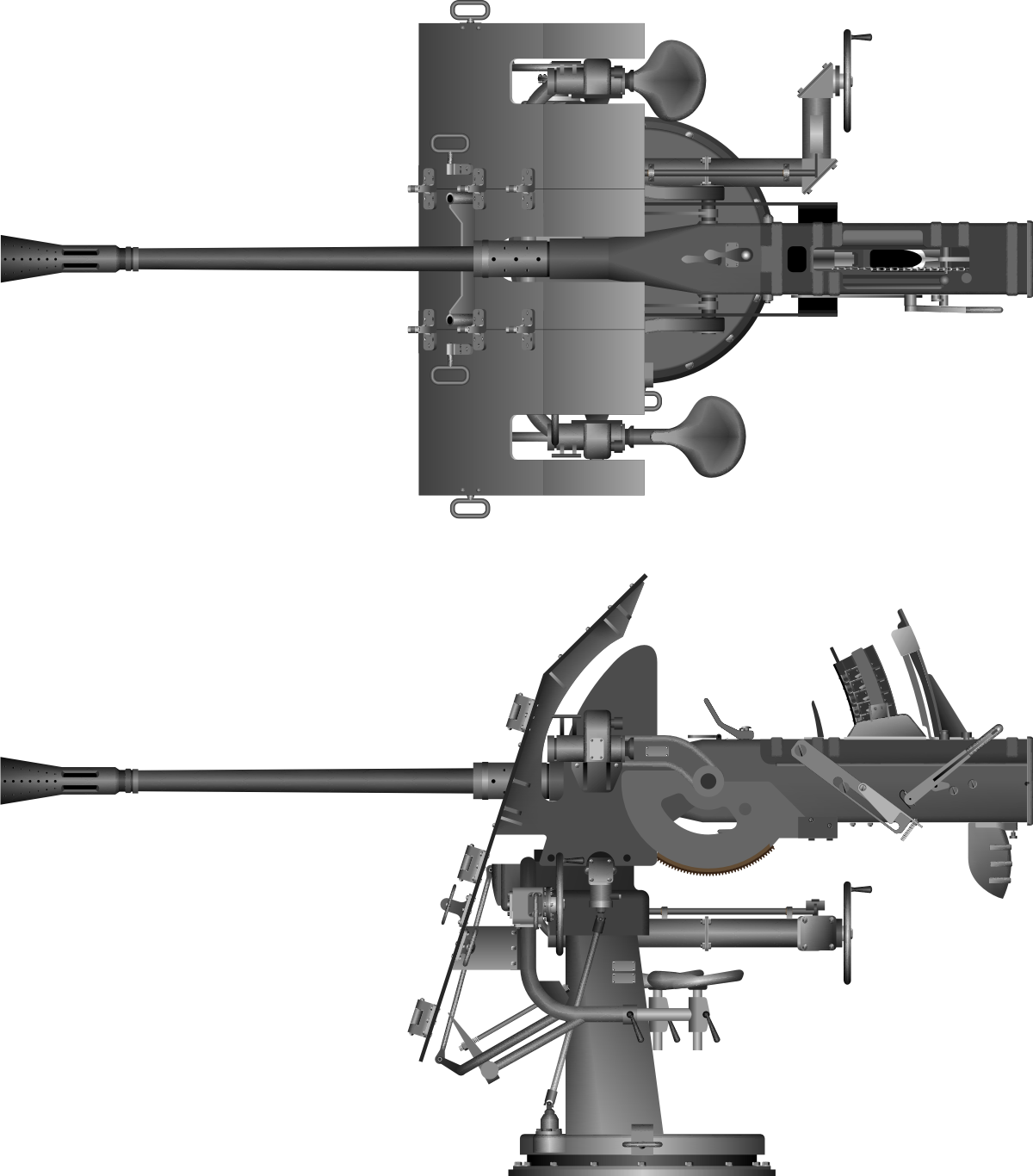
A single 3.7 cm Flak M42U gun on the LM 42U mount.

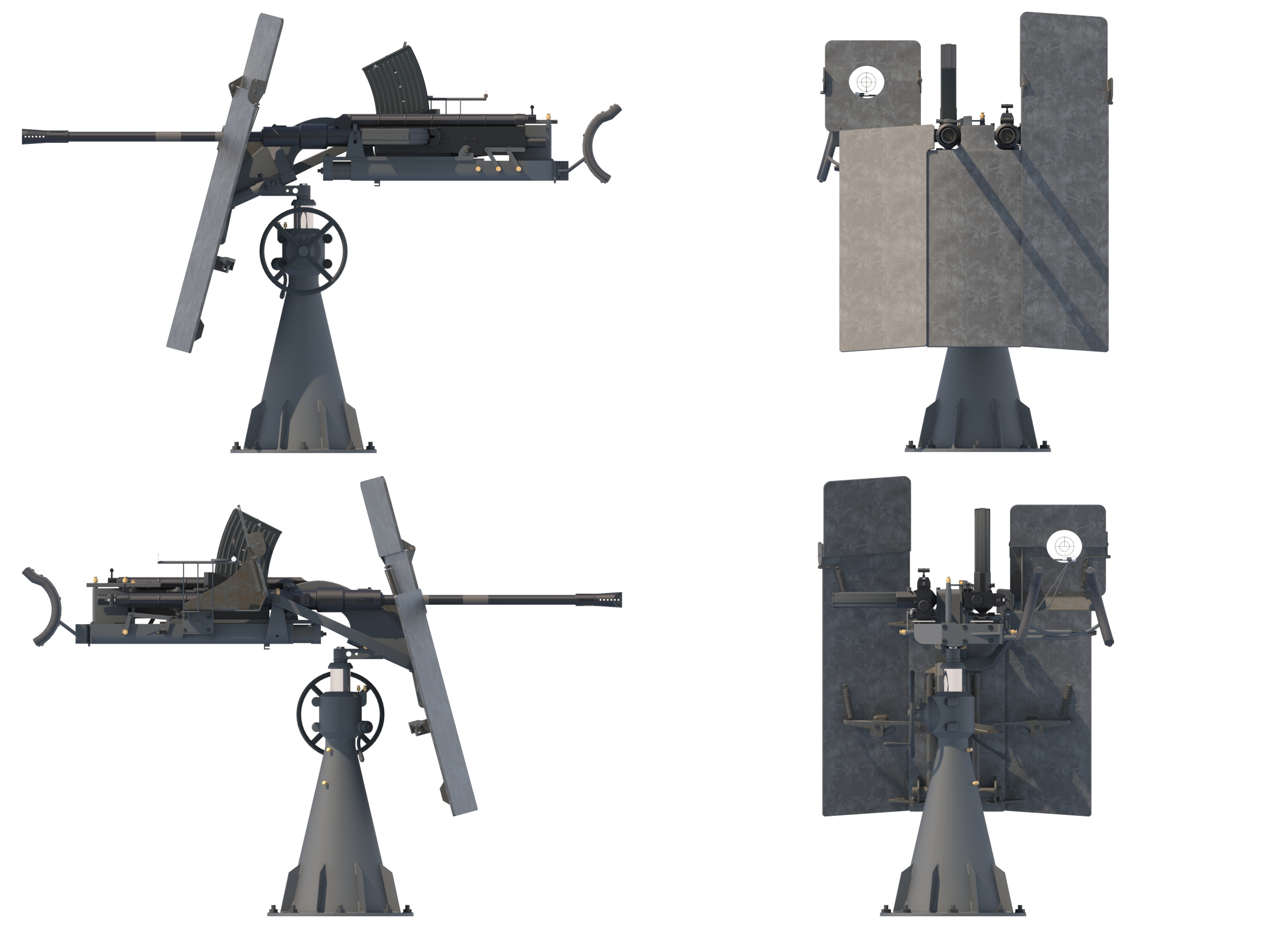
2 cm Flak C38 in a M 43U Zwilling mount with short folding shield.

== Service history ==
U-853 was built by DeSchiMAG AG Weser of Bremen. Ordered on 5 June 1941, her keel was laid down on 21 August 1942, the submarine was launched on 11 March 1943 and was commissioned on 25 June 1943. On commissioning, U-853 joined the 4th U-boat Flotilla based at Stettin, Prussia (now Szczecin, Poland) for training of her crew, under the command of Kapitänleutnant Helmut Sommer.

The Germans nicknamed the U-boat der Seiltänzer ("the Tightrope Walker"), and her crew painted an emblem of a yellow shield with a red horse on her sail.

=== First patrol ===
In 1 April 1944, U-853 transferred to the 10th U-boat Flotilla for active service. U-853 left Bergen in Norway on her first war patrol on 29 April 1944, with the submarine assigned the duty of weather-reporting. German intelligence believed that weather conditions in the Atlantic could be used to help predict the timing of an Allied invasion of Europe. On 25 May 1944 U-853 spotted RMS Queen Mary, loaded with American troops and supplies. The U-boat submerged to attack, but was outrun by the much larger and faster ship. As she surfaced in Queen Mary's wake U-853 was attacked by Fairey Swordfish aircraft from the British merchant aircraft carriers MV Ancylus and MV Empire MacKendrick. The U-boat took no significant damage and returned fire, hitting all three aircraft. The planes were able to return to their carrier, but after recovery one was deemed a total loss and jettisoned.

The escort carrier USS Croatan had been hunting weather boats for nearly a month and had already sunk U-488 and U-490. Intercepted radio transmissions led Croatan and six destroyers to search for U-853. The U-853 proved so elusive that Croatan's crew nicknamed their prey "Moby Dick." After ten days of hunting, on 17 June Huff-Duff (HF/DF, high frequency direction finding) picked up a weather report from U-853 only 30 nautical miles (56 km; 35 mi) away. Within minutes two FM-1 Wildcat fighters strafed the submarine, killing 2 men and wounding 12 others. Sommer suffered 28 shrapnel and bullet wounds yet still managed to give the order to submerge. In all likelihood Sommer saved his submarine from being destroyed by Allied bombers.

Three weeks of pursuit from 25 May until 17 June placed an enormous strain on U-853's crew. Twenty-three-year-old Oberleutnant zur See Helmut Frömsdorf took command of the boat on 18 June (his first command) and returned to Lorient in northwest France. On 10 July Sommer was formally relieved by Oberleutnant zur See Otto Wermuth.

=== Second patrol ===
The boat remained in port until 27 August. Decorated veteran Korvettenkapitän Günter Kuhnke, Commander of the 10th U-boat Flotilla, took command for her second patrol. U-853 operated this time in the Western Approaches off the British Isles, but in a period of seven weeks scored no successes. On completion she did not return to Lorient, but continued to Flensburg, Germany, arriving 14 October. Kuhnke assumed command of the 33rd U-boat Flotilla upon arriving at Flensburg. He relinquished command of U-853 back to Frömsdorf, who took the U-boat on her third and final patrol. Before departure U-853 was fitted with a Schnorchel, a retractable air intake and exhaust that allowed the ship to remain submerged while running her diesel engines. The Schnorchel reduced the need to spend dangerous periods on the surface recharging batteries.

=== Last patrol ===
On 23 February 1945 Germany sent U-853 on her third war patrol to harass US coastal shipping. Under the command of Oberleutnant zur See Helmut Frömsdorf, U-853 did not sink any targets during the first weeks of her patrol. Her crossing of the Atlantic was slow because she used her Schnorchel to remain submerged to avoid being spotted by Allied aircraft. On 1 April 1945 U-853 was ordered to the Gulf of Maine.

On 23 April she fatally torpedoed USS Eagle 56 near Portland, Maine. Eagle 56, a World War I-era patrol boat, was towing targets for a United States Navy dive-bomber training exercise 3 nautical miles (5.6 km; 3.5 mi) off Cape Elizabeth when she exploded amidships and sank. Only 13 of the 67 crew survived. That same day USS Selfridge dropped nine depth charges on a suspected submarine. The next day USS Muskegon made sonar contact and attacked U-853, but failed to destroy her.

Although several survivors claimed to have seen a submarine sail with yellow and red insignia, a Navy inquiry attributed the PE-56 sinking to a boiler explosion. The Navy reversed its findings in 2001 to acknowledge that the sinking was due to hostile fire and awarded Purple Hearts to the survivors and next-of-kin of the deceased.

=== Battle of Point Judith ===
Sinking of U-853

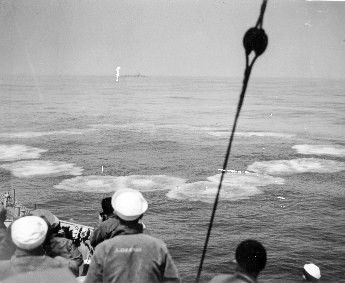
USS Moberly launches a hedgehog weapon against U-853

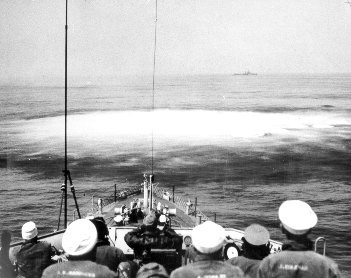
Hedgehog charges detonate on the ocean floor

On 5 May 1945, Reichspräsident of Nazi Germany Karl Dönitz ordered all U-boats to cease offensive operations and return to their bases. U-853 was lying in wait off Point Judith, Rhode Island, at the time. According to the US Coast Guard, U-853 either did not receive that order or, less likely, ignored it. Soon after, her torpedo blew off the stern of Black Point, a 368-foot (112 m) collier underway from New York to Boston. Within 15 minutes Black Point had sunk in 100 feet (30 m) of water less than 4 nautical miles (7.4 km; 4.6 mi) south of Point Judith. She was the last US-flagged merchant ship lost in World War II. Twelve men died and 34 crew members were rescued. One of the rescuing ships, Yugoslav freighter Kamen, sent a report of the torpedoing to authorities. The US Navy organized a "hunter-killer" group that included four American warships: the destroyer USS Ericsson, the destroyer escorts USS Amick and USS Atherton, and the patrol frigate USS Moberly.

The group discovered U-853 bottomed in 18 fathoms (108 ft; 33 m), and dropped depth charges and hedgehogs during a 16-hour attack. At first, the U-boat attempted to flee, then tried to hide by lying still. Both times it was found by sonar. On the morning of 6 May 1945 two K-Class blimps from Lakehurst, New Jersey, K-16 and K-58, joined the attack, locating oil slicks and marking suspected locations with smoke and dye markers. K-16 also attacked with 7.2-inch rocket bombs. Numerous depth charge and hedgehog attacks from Atherton and Moberly resulted in planking, life rafts, a chart tabletop, clothing, and an officer's cap floating to the surface. U-853 was one of the last U-boats sunk during World War II and the last to be sunk in US waters. (U-881 was sunk the same day in the North Atlantic.) Atherton and Moberly received joint credit for the kill.

== Wreck ==
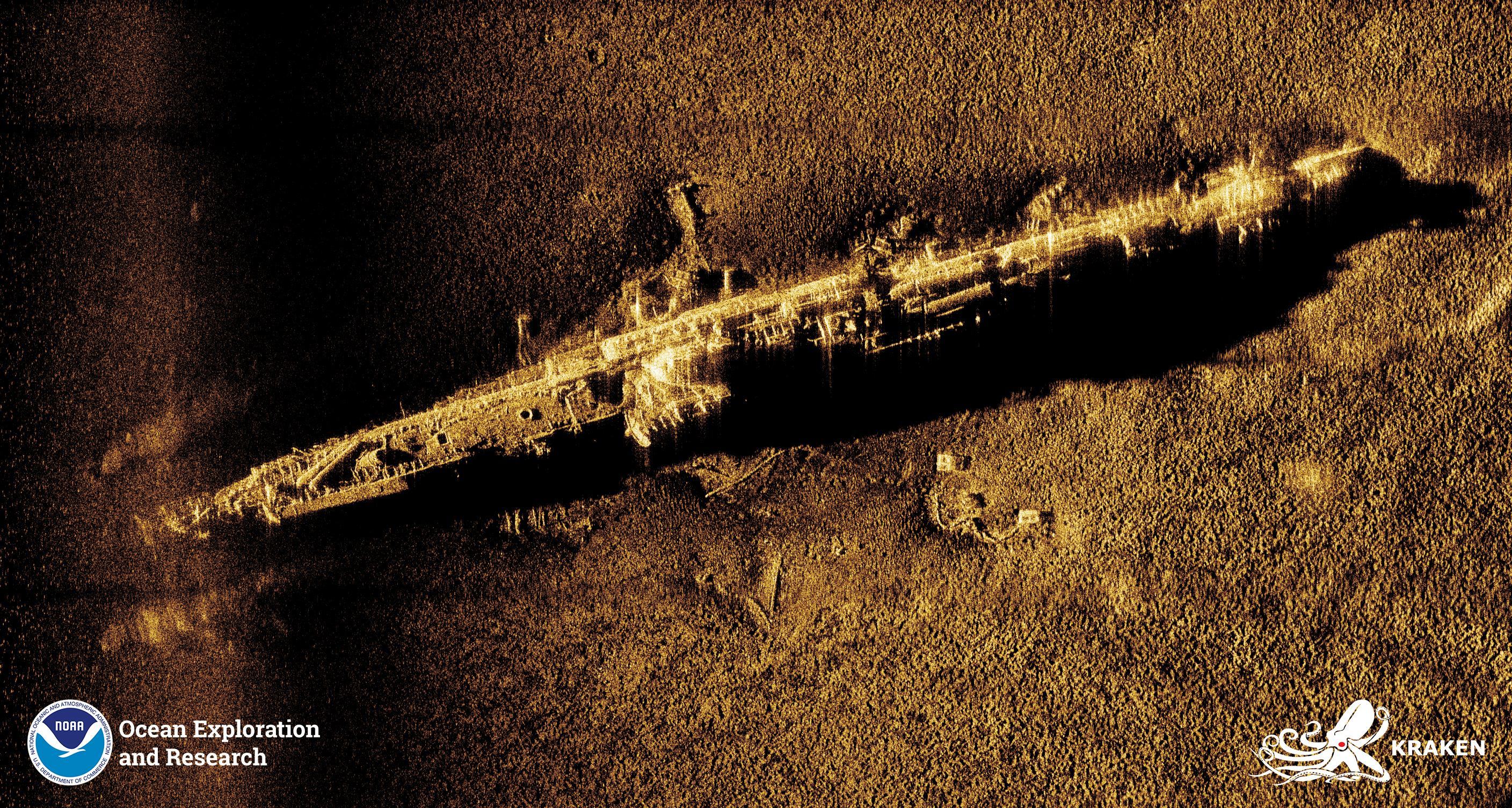
Synthetic aperture sonar imagery of the German submarine U-853.

U-853 lies 7 nautical miles (13 km; 8.1 mi) east of Block Island in 130 feet (40 m) of water. The US Coast Guard pinpoints the location of the wreck at 41°13′N 71°27′W. Most of the 55 crew member bodies remain within the hull, which is a war grave. It is one of the more popular dive sites in Southern New England. The hull has depth charge blast holes: one forward of the conning tower at the radio room and another in the starboard side of the engine room. Entering the wreck is dangerous due to debris, sharp metal edges, and confined spaces.

On 6 and 7 May 1945, Navy divers attempted to enter the wreck to recover the captain's safe and the papers within, but failed. Recreational divers first visited the site in 1953. In 1960 a recreational diver brought up a body from the wreck. This provoked former navy admirals and clergy to petition the US government for restrictions on disturbing the dead. The German crewman was buried with full military honors in Newport, Rhode Island.

As of 1998 at least two recreational divers have died from exploring the wreckage. Stephen Hardick, a scuba instructor, died in 2005 while filming the U-boat. He surfaced unconscious and could not be revived. Hardick, age 60, died as the result of saltwater drowning associated with poor health according to the Rhode Island Medical Examiner's office.

On October 26, 2022, a live depth charge that had been aimed at U-853 was found near the wreckage by fishermen based out of Rhode Island. The depth charge contained 267 pounds of TNT.

== Summary of raiding history ==
Date	Ship Name	Nationality	Tonnage (Note: Merchant ship tonnages are in gross register tons. Military vessels are listed by tons displacement.)	Fate
23 April 1945	USS Eagle 56	United States Navy	430	Sunk
5 May 1945	Black Point	United States	5,353	Sunk

== Bibliography ==
- Blair, Clay (2000). Hitler's U-Boat War: The Hunted, 1942–1945. New York: Modern Library. ISBN 0-679-64033-9.
- Busch, Rainer; Röll, Hans-Joachim (1999). German U-boat Commanders of World War II: A Biographical Dictionary. Translated by Brooks, Geoffrey. London, Annapolis, Md: Greenhill Books, Naval Institute Press. ISBN 1-55750-186-6.
- Busch, Rainer; Röll, Hans-Joachim (1999). Der U-Boot-Krieg, 1939-1945: Deutsche U-Boot-Verluste von September 1939 bis Mai 1945 [German U-boat losses from September 1939 to May 1945] (in German). Vol. IV. Hamburg, Berlin, Bonn: Mittler. ISBN 3-8132-0514-2.
- Gröner, Eric; Jung, Dieter; Maass, Martin (1991). German Warships 1815-1945: U-boats and Mine Warfare Vessels. Vol. 2. Translated by Thomas, Keith; Magowan, Rachel. London: Conway Maritime Press. ISBN 0-85177-593-4.
- Wynn, Kenneth (1998). U-Boat Operations of the Second World War: Volume 2: Career Histories, U511–UIT25. London: Chatham Publishing. ISBN 1-86176-069-8.
