= BRP Datu Kalantiaw =

1943 Cannon-class destroyer escort

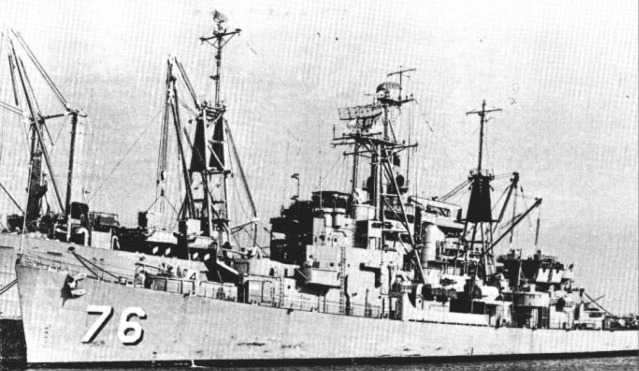
- RPS Datu Kalantiaw c. 1968

History

United States
- Name: Booth
- Ordered: 1942
- Builder: Federal Drydock & Shipbuilding Co.
- Laid down: 30 January 1943
- Launched: 21 June 1943
- Commissioned: 19 September 1943
- Decommissioned: 4 March 1946
- Stricken: 15 July 1978
- Fate: Loaned to Philippine Navy in 1967, sold as FMA 1978.

Philippines
- Name: Datu Kalantiaw
- Namesake: Kalantiaw was a legendary chieftain in the island of Negros who supposedly created in 1433 the first legal code known as the Code of Kalantiaw.
- Acquired: 15 December 1967
- Commissioned: 1967
- Fate: Ran aground by Typhoon Clara on 21 September 1981, 19.39017440035165°N 121.39150737073103°E

General characteristics
- Class & type: Datu Kalantiaw-class destroyer escort/frigate
- Displacement: 1,240 tons standard, 1,620 tons full load
- Length: 306 ft (93 m)
- Beam: 36.66 ft (11.17 m)
- Draft: 8.75 ft (2.67 m)
- Installed power: 6,000 hp (4,500 kW)
- Propulsion: 4 × GM 16-278A diesel engines with electric drive
- Speed: 21 knots (39 km/h; 24 mph) (maximum)
- Range: 10,800 mi (9,400 nmi; 17,400 km) at 12 knots (22 km/h; 14 mph)
- Armament: 3 × Mk.22 3"/50 caliber gun dual purpose guns; 1 × Mk.1 Twin Bofors 40 mm gun; 8 × Mk.4 Oerlikon 20 mm; 1 × Hedgehog projector Mk10 (144 rounds); 8 × Mk.6 depth charge projectors; 2 × Mk.9 depth charge tracks; 3 × Mk.15 21-inch torpedo tubes

BRP Datu Kalantiaw (PS-76) was the first of three ex-USN Cannon-class destroyer escorts that served with the Philippine Navy, the others being BRP Datu Sikatuna (PS-77/PF-5) and BRP Rajah Humabon (PS-78/PF-11). She was also the flagship of the Philippine Navy from 1967 to 1981.

== History ==
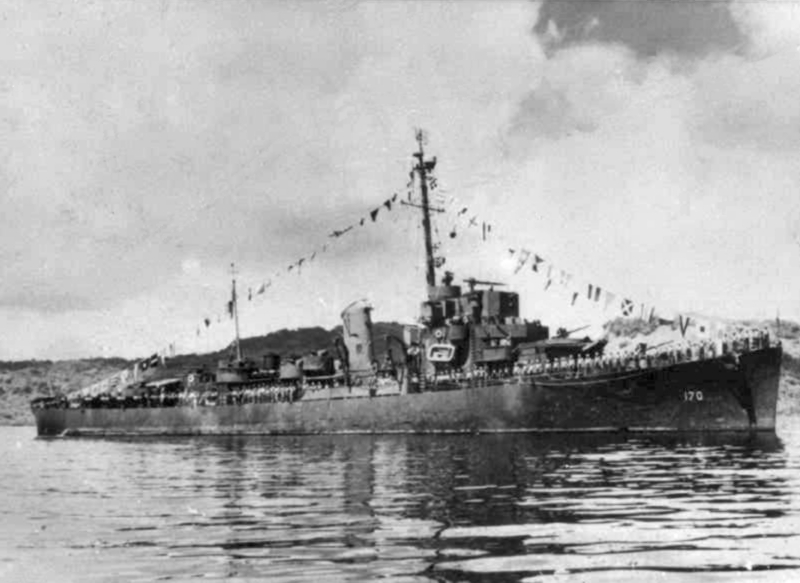
As USS Booth, c. 1945

Commissioned in the US Navy as USS Booth (DE-170) in 1943, she was mostly assigned at the Atlantic theatre doing escort duties for UGS and GUS convoys. She served in the Pacific theater in the middle of 1945 until she was decommissioned on 14 June 1946. Booth was placed in "deferred disposal status pending possible transfer to a foreign government" on 7 July 1947, and two days later was towed back to Mayport by ATA-209, where the former convoy escort was inactivated on 28 July 1947.

Reconditioned by the Brewer Dry Dock Co., Staten Island, New York, the ship was loaned to the Republic of the Philippines under the Military Assistance Program on 15 December 1967. The Philippine Navy commissioned her on that day at the Philadelphia Navy Yard as RPS Datu Kalantiaw (PS-76). On 30 June 1975, while she was still operating on loan under a foreign flag, the destroyer escort was re-designated a frigate, FF-170. Subsequently, given the Philippine Navy's continuing need for the ship "in the interest of National Defense Requirements and in the furtherance of the Security Alliance between the Philippines and the United States," the U.S. Navy disposed of her by Foreign Military Sale and Booth was stricken from the Naval Vessel Register on 15 July 1978.

In July 1980, in line with the re-classification of all Philippine Navy ships, she was renamed BRP Datu Kalantiaw (PS-76) using a localized prefix to replace the previously used English prefix.

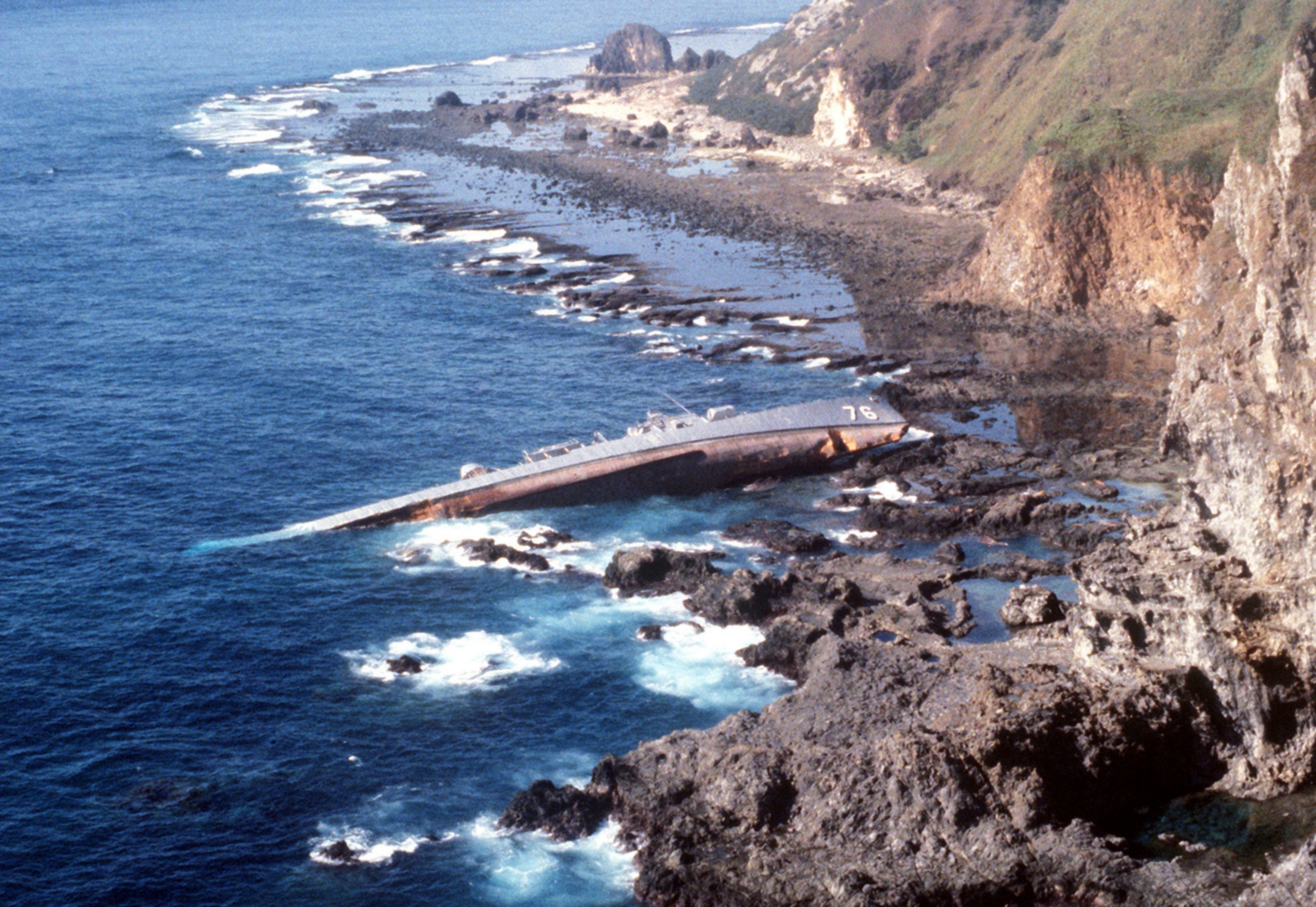
BRP Datu Kalantiaw foundered on the coast of Calayan Island

Datu Kalantiaw continued to serve under the Philippine flag until Typhoon Clara drove her aground on 21 September 1981 on the rocky northern shore of Calayan Island, in the northern Philippines. The ammunition ship USS Mount Hood, as she neared Subic Bay that day, slated for a period of upkeep, received orders to "get underway again that evening to coordinate rescue operations" at the scene of the tragedy. Consequently, Mount Hood, working in concert with Philippine Navy units "in a most adverse weather environment," retrieved 49 bodies in two days of operations, and ultimately sailed for Manila to turn them over to Philippine authorities, rescuers no longer hearing tapping from inside the ship that lay on her beam ends where Clara had cast her. Soon thereafter, Rear Admiral Simeon Alejandro, Flag Officer in Command of the Philippine Navy, "made an emotional address to the officers and men of Mount Hood upon the ship's arrival on Manila," the auxiliary's historian records, "thanking each man for his part in the mission and offering the gratitude of the Philippine nation to the Captain and crew." One contemporary account called the loss of Datu Kalantiaw "one of the worst disasters in the history of the Philippine Navy," 79 of the 97-man crew perishing.

== Gallery ==
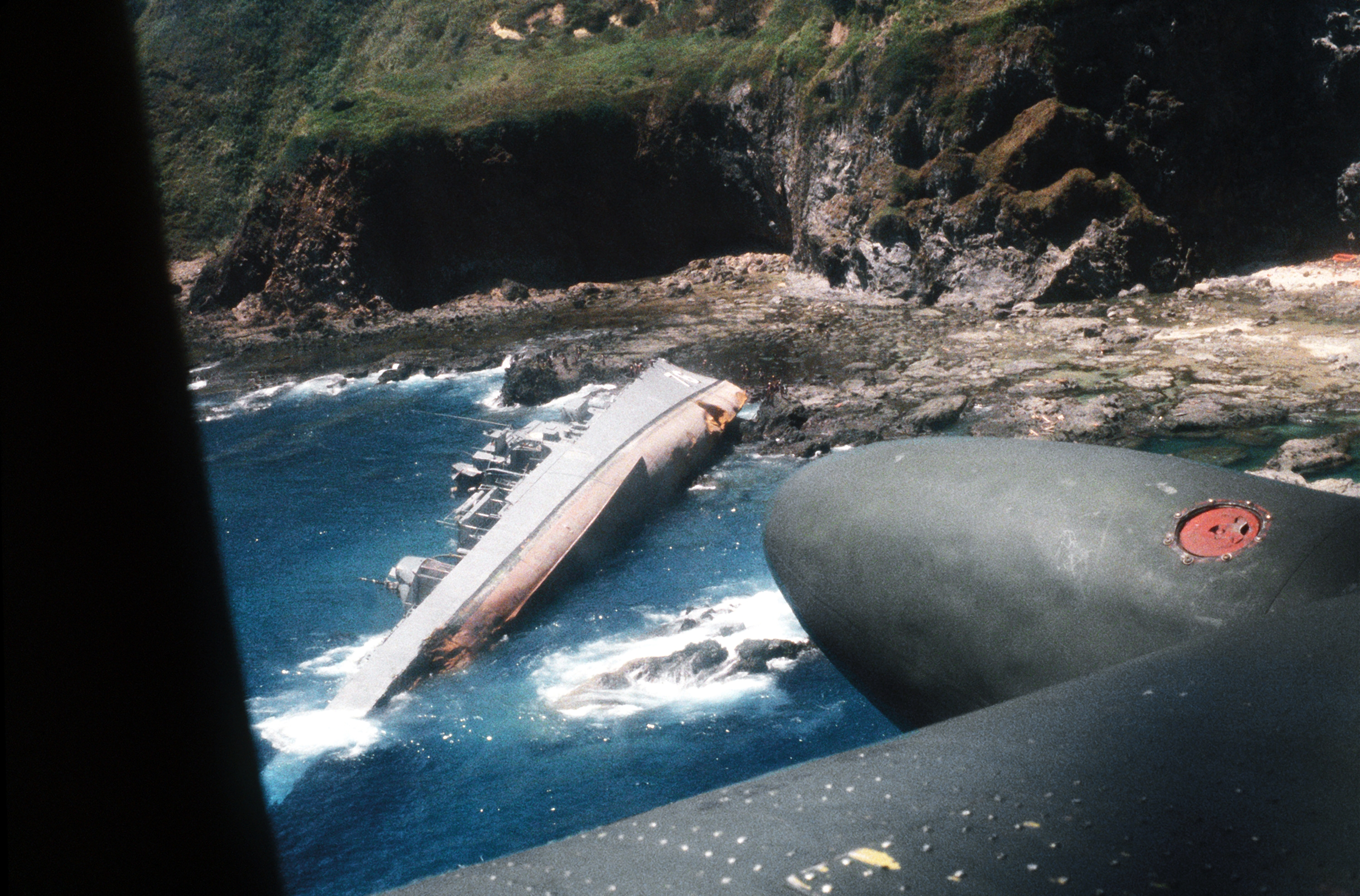
An aerial view of the capsized Philippine destroyer escort BRP Datu Kalantiaw during the Military Airlift Command's Aerospace Rescue and Recovery Service rescue operations.

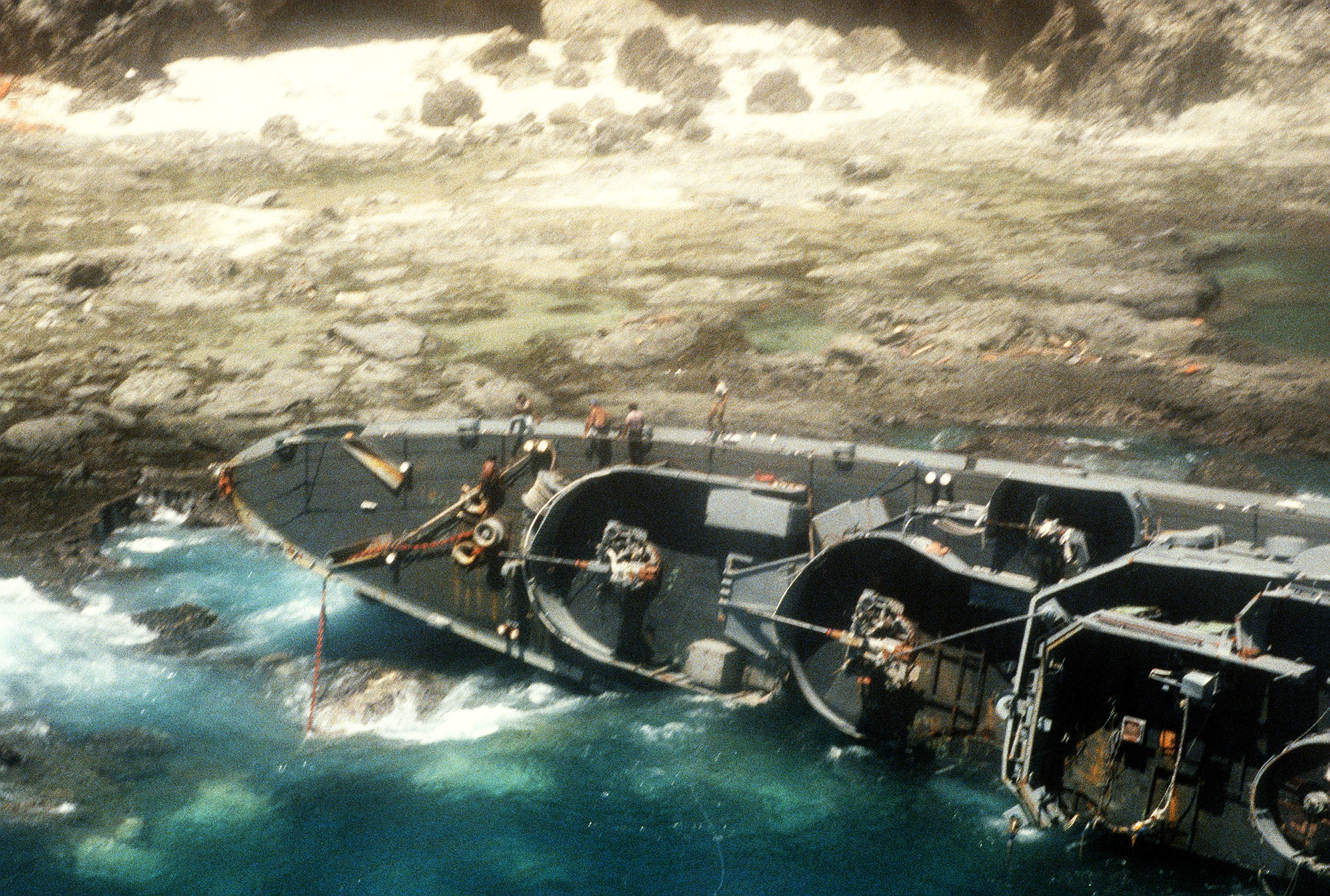

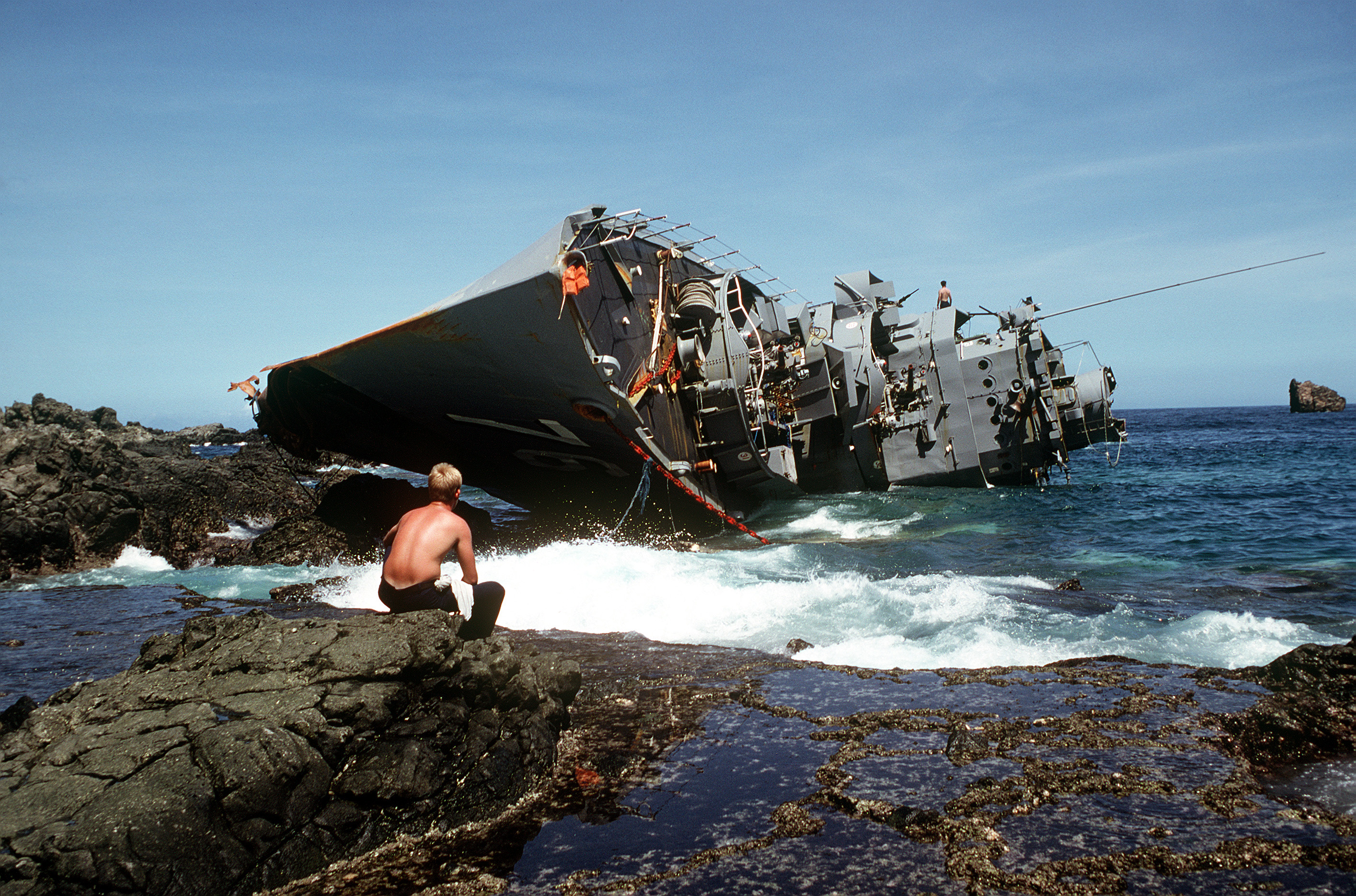
A view of the capsized Philippine destroyer escort BRP Datu Kalantiaw
