= USS Amick =

Cannon-class destroyer escort

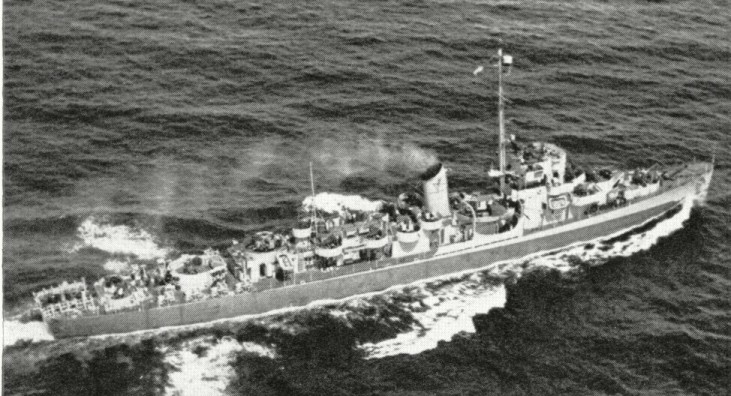
- USS Amick

History

United States
- Name: USS Amick (DE-168)
- Namesake: Eugene Earle Amick
- Builder: Federal Shipbuilding and Drydock Company, Newark, New Jersey
- Yard number: 284
- Laid down: 7 January 1943
- Launched: 27 May 1943
- Sponsored by: Mrs. Mary R. Amick
- Commissioned: 26 July 1943
- Decommissioned: 16 May 1947
- Reclassified: FF-168, 6 January 1975
- Stricken: 15 June 1975
- Fate: transferred to the Japan Maritime Self-Defense Force (JMSDF), 14 June 1955
- Acquired: returned from JMSDF, 1975
- Fate: transferred to the Philippine Navy, September 1976

History

Japan
- Name: JDS Asahi (DE-262)
- Acquired: 14 June 1955
- Fate: Returned to the United States, 1975

History

Philippines
- Name: RPS Datu Sikatuna (PS-77)
- Acquired: 13 September 1976
- Commissioned: 27 February 1980
- Decommissioned: 1989
- Renamed: BRP Datu Sikatuna (PF-5)
- Fate: Scrapped, 1989

General characteristics
- Class & type: Cannon-class destroyer escort; Asahi-class destroyer escort
- Displacement: 1,240 long tons (1,260 t) standard; 1,620 long tons (1,646 t) full
- Length: 306 ft (93 m) o/a; 300 ft (91 m) w/l
- Beam: 36 ft 10 in (11.23 m)
- Draft: 11 ft 8 in (3.56 m)
- Propulsion: 4 × GM Mod. 16-278A diesel engines with electric drive, 6,000 shp (4,474 kW), 2 screws
- Speed: 21 knots (39 km/h; 24 mph)
- Range: 10,800 nmi (20,000 km) at 12 kn (22 km/h; 14 mph)
- Complement: 15 officers and 201 enlisted
- Armament: 3 × Mk.22 3"/50 caliber guns; 1 × twin 40 mm Mk.1 AA gun; 8 × 20 mm Mk.4 AA guns; 3 × 21 inch (533 mm) torpedo tubes; 1 × Hedgehog Mk.10 anti-submarine mortar (144 rounds); 8 × Mk.6 depth charge projectors; 2 × Mk.9 depth charge tracks

USS Amick (DE-168) was a Cannon-class destroyer escort built for the United States Navy during World War II. She served in the Atlantic Ocean and then the Pacific Ocean and provided escort service against submarine and air attack for Navy vessels and convoys.

She was laid down on 30 November 1942 by the Federal Shipbuilding & Drydock Co., Newark, New Jersey; launched on 27 May 1943; sponsored by Mrs. Mary R. Amick, widow of Ens. Eugene Amick (1919–1942), who died at Guadalcanal and for whom the ship was named; and commissioned at the New York Navy Yard on 26 July 1943.

== World War II North Atlantic Ocean operations ==
Amick left the east coast early in September for shakedown training out of Bermuda. During this cruise, the ship was also engaged in operations testing experimental defensive devices intended to protect American ships against acoustic torpedoes.

In early November, Amick became a member of Task Force 62 and began duty as an escort for transatlantic convoys. The ship also acted as flagship for Escort Division (CortDiv) 15. From November 1943 through May 1945, she completed nine round-trip voyages across the Atlantic. These terminated in several different ports: Casablanca, Morocco; Gibraltar; Bizerte, Tunisia; Palermo, Sicily; and Oran, Algeria. Only one of her convoys was ever harassed by enemy forces. On 1 August 1944, German aircraft attacked the convoy while it was sailing in the Mediterranean off Cape Bengut, Algeria, but failed to damage any ships.

During her 18 months of wartime operations in the Atlantic, Amick entered either the New York Navy Yard or the Boston Navy Yard for short availabilities at the completion of each westward crossing. As a rule, she then proceeded to Casco Bay, Maine, or Montauk Point, New York, for training exercises before joining another convoy. Amick participated in a small engagement known as the Battle of Point Judith on 5 and 6 May 1945, during which she helped sink the German U-boat U-853 off Rhode Island.

== World War II Pacific Theatre operations ==
On 28 May 1945, Amick sailed from Boston, Massachusetts, with CortDiv 15, bound for the Pacific. They paused at Guantanamo Bay, Cuba, for one week of training and then proceeded to the Panama Canal Zone. The destroyer escorts transited the Panama Canal on 10 June and sailed on to San Diego, California. From that port, Amick and her sister ships headed for the Hawaiian Islands and moored at Pearl Harbor on the 29th.

After a fortnight of exercises out of Pearl Harbor, CortDiv 15 got underway for Eniwetok. Amick sailed for the Mariana Islands and, at Saipan, reported to Task Unit (TU) 94.7.2 for duty. The destroyer escort completed one voyage to Okinawa and back before sailing for the Western Caroline Islands. On 15 August, while en route to Ulithi, she received word of Japan's capitulation.

== End-of-War activity ==
Amick touched at Ulithi on the 16th; and, three days later, she reached Peleliu in the Palau Islands and joined Task Unit 94.6.1. On 23 August, several Navy and Marine Corps officials embarked in Amick for passage to the northern Palau Islands. There, they held a series of conferences with Japanese officers which culminated on 1 September in the unconditional surrender of all Japanese forces in the northern Palaus, which was received by the Americans in the wardroom on board Amick.

On 3 November, Amick departed Peleliu, bound for the United States. She made brief stops at Saipan and Pearl Harbor before arriving back at San Diego, California, on 22 November.

== Post-War inactivation ==
The destroyer escort was reassigned to the Atlantic Fleet on 1 December and, shortly thereafter, got underway for the east coast. She reached Jacksonville, Florida, on 3 January 1946, and entered a shipyard there for repairs. After this work was completed, she was assigned to CortDiv 12 and berthed at Green Cove Springs, Florida, to undergo preservation work prior to deactivation. The warship remained semi-active at Green Cove Springs, serving as a receiving ship for sailors from other ships completing the inactivation process, until she herself was decommissioned on 16 May 1947.

== Japanese service ==
After eight years in reserve, Amick was loaned to Japan on 14 June 1955 under the terms of the Mutual Defense Assistance Program. She served in the Japanese Maritime Self-Defense Force as Asahi (DE-262) until returned to the US Navy early in 1975. On 6 January 1975, she was reclassified a frigate and redesignated FF-168. Not long thereafter, she was determined to be unfit for further service, and her name was struck from the Navy List on 15 June 1975.

== Philippine service ==
She was sold to the Republic of the Philippines in September 1976 and was renamed RPS Datu Sikatuna (PS-77). In July 1980 she was renamed BRP Datu Sikatuna (PF-5) as changes in naming and numbering of ships in the Philippine Navy were made. She served with the Philippine Navy until she was decommissioned and scrapped in 1989.
