= USS Muir =

Cannon-class destroyer escort

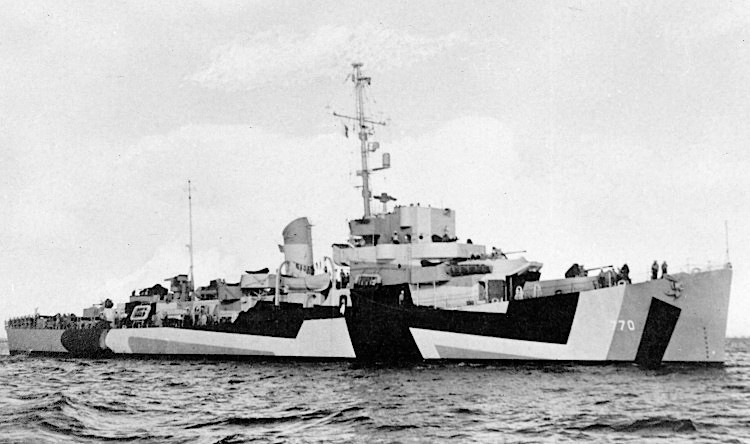

History

United States
- Name: USS Muir
- Namesake: Kenneth Hart Muir
- Builder: Tampa Shipbuilding Company, Tampa, Florida
- Laid down: 1 June 1943
- Launched: 4 June 1944
- Commissioned: 30 August 1944
- Decommissioned: September 1947
- Stricken: 15 November 1974
- Fate: Loaned to South Korea, 2 February 1956

South Korea
- Name: ROKS Kyongki (F-71)
- Acquired: 2 February 1956
- Stricken: 28 December 1977
- Fate: Sent to the Philippines to be cannibalized for spare parts

General characteristics
- Class & type: Cannon-class destroyer escort
- Displacement: 1,240 long tons (1,260 t) standard; 1,620 long tons (1,646 t) full
- Length: 306 ft (93 m) o/a; 300 ft (91 m) w/l
- Beam: 36 ft 10 in (11.23 m)
- Draft: 11 ft 8 in (3.56 m)
- Propulsion: 4 × GM Mod. 16-278A diesel engines with electric drive, 6,000 shp (4,474 kW), 2 screws
- Speed: 21 knots (39 km/h; 24 mph)
- Range: 10,800 nmi (20,000 km) at 12 kn (22 km/h; 14 mph)
- Complement: 15 officers and 201 enlisted
- Armament: 3 × single Mk.22 3"/50 caliber guns; 1 × twin 40 mm Mk.1 AA gun; 8 × 20 mm Mk.4 AA guns; 3 × 21-inch (533 mm) torpedo tubes; 1 × Hedgehog Mk.10 anti-submarine mortar (144 rounds); 8 × Mk.6 depth charge projectors; 2 × Mk.9 depth charge tracks

USS Muir (DE-770) was a Cannon-class destroyer escort in service with the United States Navy from 1943 to 1947. In 1956, she was transferred to South Korea, where she served as Kyongki (F-71) until 1977. The ship was then cannibalized for spare parts in the Philippines.

== Namesake ==
Kenneth Hart Muir was born on 25 July 1916 in Brooklyn, New York. He enlisted in the U.S. Naval Reserve on 23 September 1940 serving as apprentice seaman until he was appointed midshipman on 14 February 1941. Muir died in action as officer in charge of the U.S. Armed Guard on board SS Nathaniel Hawthorne, sunk in the Caribbean on 7 November 1942 by U-508. Although severely wounded, he "ordered the three men near him to leap clear and then rushed back to help more escape. He was still urging his gunners over the side when the ship went down." He was posthumously awarded the Navy Cross and the Purple Heart.

== History ==
Muir was laid down by Tampa Shipbuilding Co., Tampa, Florida, on 1 June 1943; launched on 4 June 1944, sponsored by Mrs. Witten H. McConnochie, sister of the late Lieutenant (jg.) Muir; and commissioned on 30 August 1944.

=== United States Navy (1944-1956) ===
Following shakedown off Bermuda, British West Indies, Muir operated as school ship in the Chesapeake Bay area from 16 November into December. On 9 December she sailed for Europe, arriving off Gibraltar the 26th to begin a year of convoy duty between the east coast and Mediterranean ports. She also served as part of a "Killer Group," Task Group 22.13, so called because the primary duty was to hunt and destroy enemy submarines. Towards the end of the European war, Muir operated with Task Force 63 which stymied the German U-boats' final thrust against Allied shipping in the North Atlantic.

When the news of Germany's surrender was received on 8 May 1945, Muir and her group began locating German submarines to accept their surrender. On 10 May she and Carter (DE-112) approached U-858 through a dense fog, her black flag of surrender barely visible even at close range. She was turned over to two other escort ships for delivery to a U.S. port.

On 17 May Muir joined Sutton (DE-771) in escorting under guard publicized U-234, with high ranking Luftwaffe officers and men German civilian technicians on board, to Portsmouth, New Hampshire, arriving two days later. The escort ship continued on to New York City, mooring the 20th.

From 14 June Muir operated off Mayport, Florida, with Guadalcanal (CVE-60), training carrier pilots for Pacific duty until Japan surrendered in mid-August. On 27 August she departed Mayport for Charleston Navy Yard, Charleston, South Carolina, arriving a day later.

After visiting Houston, Texas, for Navy Day on 27 October, she devoted November and December to a cruise testing "SOFAR," a new long-range air sea rescue method. She traveled 7,500 miles in the Atlantic dropping bombs for naval ships in the Bahamas to pick up the sound waves and plot the position of the destroyer escort as far away as Dakar, French West Africa (now Senegal).

In March 1946 Muir reactivated and was assigned to the Operational Development Force, with Norfolk, Virginia, as her homeport, for service into late 1947.

=== Republic of Korea Navy (1956-1977) ===
In September 1947 she decommissioned and entered the Atlantic Reserve Fleet at Green Cove Springs, Florida, until 2 February 1956 when she was delivered on loan under the Military Assistance Program to the Republic of Korea at Boston Naval Shipyard. Struck from the Navy List on 1 July 1960, she continued to serve the South Korean Navy on loan as ROKS Kyongki (F-71) until she was stricken on 28 December 1977 and sent to the Philippines for cannibalization of parts.
