= List of destroyer escorts of the United States Navy =

Ships of the United States Navy

Ships in current service
- Current ships

Ships grouped alphabetically
- A–B; C; D–F; G–H; I–K; L; M; N–O; P; Q–R; S; T–V; W–Z

Ships grouped by type
- Aircraft carriers; Airships; Amphibious warfare ships; Auxiliaries; Battlecruisers; Battleships; Cruisers; Destroyers; Destroyer escorts; Destroyer leaders; Escort carriers; Frigates; Hospital ships; Littoral combat ships; Mine warfare vessels; Monitors; Oilers; Patrol vessels; Registered civilian vessels; Sailing frigates; Steam frigates; Steam gunboats; Ships of the line; Sloops of war; Submarines; Torpedo boats; Torpedo retrievers; Unclassified miscellaneous; Yard and district craft

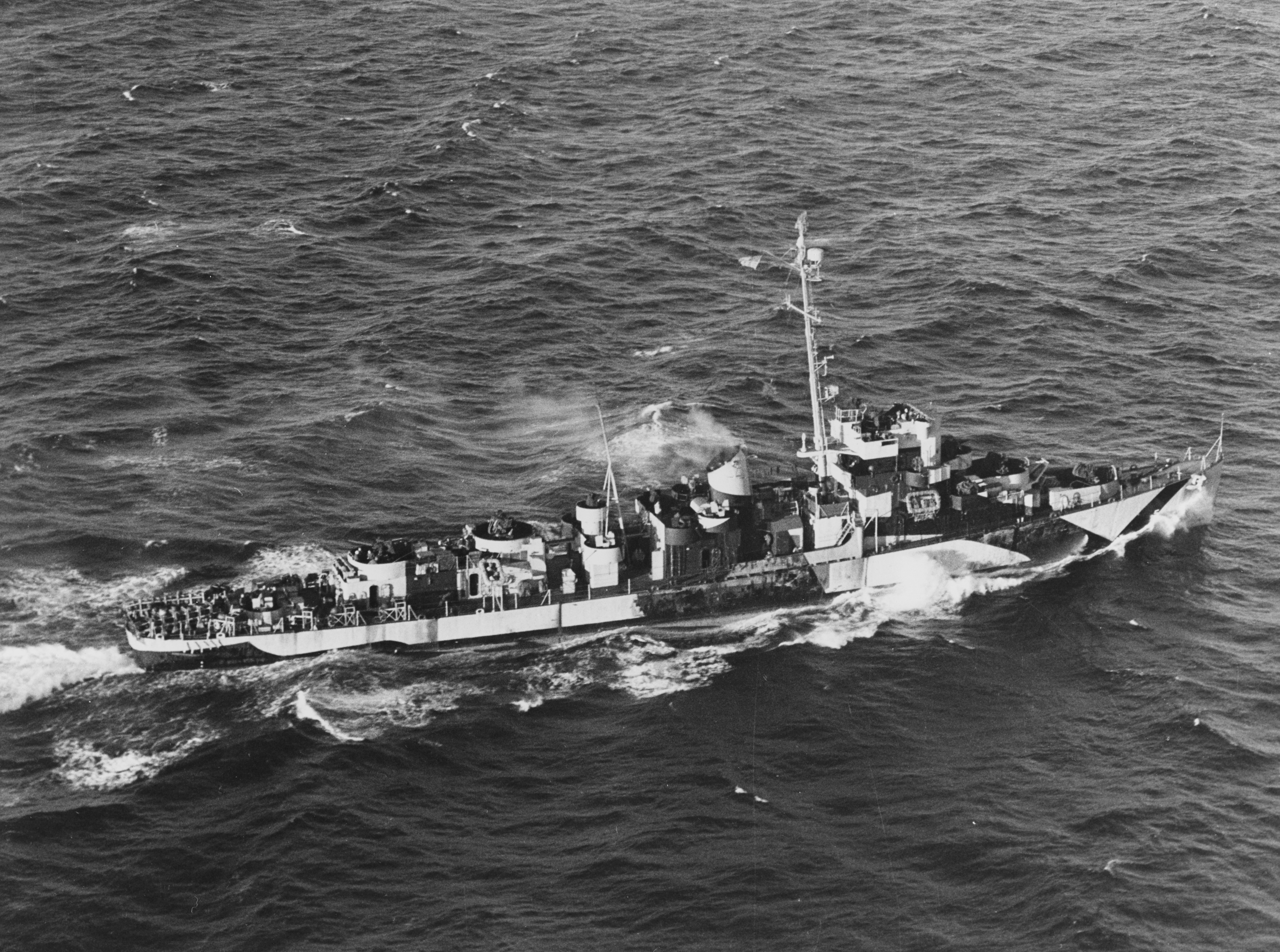
USS Evarts

This is a list of destroyer escorts of the United States Navy, listed in a table sortable by both name and hull-number. It includes the hull classification symbols DE (both Destroyer Escort and Ocean Escort), DEG (Destroyer Escort, Guided missile), and DER (Destroyer Escort, Radar picket).

== Historical overview ==
The Lend-Lease Act was passed into law in the US in March 1941 enabling the United Kingdom to procure merchant ships, warships and munitions etc. from the US, in order to help with the war effort. This enabled the UK to commission the US to design, build and supply an escort vessel that was suitable for anti submarine warfare in deep open ocean situations, which they did in June 1941. Captain E.L. Cochrane of the American Bureau of Shipping came up with a design which was known as the British Destroyer Escort (BDE). The BDE designation was retained by the first six Destroyer Escorts transferred to the United Kingdom (BDE 1, 2, 3, 4, 12 and 46); of the initial order of 50 these were the only ones the Royal Navy received, the rest being reclassified as Destroyer Escort (DE) on 25 January 1943 and taken over by the United States Navy.

Ships that were classified DE or DEG were reclassified in 1975 as FF or FFG (frigates). This affected hull numbers DE-1037 and higher as well as all DEGs.

== Classes ==
- 97 Evarts were completed
  - 32 converted to Royal Navy Captain-class frigates before commissioning as DEs
  - 34 converted to DERs
- 154 Buckleys were completed
  - 46 converted to Captains before commissioning as DEs
  - 37 reclassified and converted to APDs after having been commissioned as DEs
  - 6 in addition to the 154 completed as APDs
- 22 Rudderrow were completed
  - 1 converted to APD after commissioning as DE
  - 50 additional completed as APDs
- 83 John C. Butler were completed
  - 2 converted to DERs

Class	Design type	Lead ship	Commissioned	# Ships ordered	# Ships completed as US DEs
Evarts	GMT	USS Evarts (DE-5)	15 April 1943	105	65
Buckley	TE	USS Buckley (DE-51)	30 April 1943	154	65
Cannon	DET	USS Cannon (DE-99)	26 September 1943	116	58
Edsall	FMR	USS Edsall (DE-129)	10 April 1943	85	85
Rudderow	TEV	USS Rudderow (DE-224)	15 May 1944	252	21
John C. Butler	WGT	USS John C. Butler (DE-339)	31 March 1944	293	83
Dealey	SCB 72	USS Dealey (DE-1006)	3 June 1954	13	13
Claud Jones	SCB 131	USS Claud Jones (DE-1033)	10 February 1959	4	4
Bronstein	SCB 199	USS Bronstein (DE-1037)	16 June 1963	2	2
Garcia	SCB 199A	USS Garcia (DE-1040)	21 December 1964	11	11
Brooke	SCB 199B	USS Brooke (DEG-1)	12 March 1966	19	6
Knox	SCB 199C	USS Knox (DE-1052)	12 April 1969	55	46

== Destroyer Escorts (DE) ==
Name	Hull number	Notes
Abercrombie	DE-343	Sunk as target 7 January 1968
Acree	DE-167	Sold for scrap, 19 July 1973
Ahrens	DE-575	Sold for scrap, 20 January 1967
Ainsworth	DE-1090	Museum ship, Izmir, Turkey (as Turkey: TCG Ege)
Albert David	DE-1050	In reserve, (as Brazil: Pará)
Albert T. Harris	DE-447	Sunk as target 9 April 1969
Alexander J. Luke	DE-577	Sunk as target, 22 October 1970
Alfred Wolf	DE-544	Cancelled
Alger	DE-101	Scrapped, 1964 (as Brazil: Babitonga)
Alvin C. Cockrell	DE-366	Sunk as target 19 September 1969
Aylwin	DE-1081	Active, (as Taiwan: Ni Yang (F 938))
Amesbury	DE-66	Sold for Scrap. Sank under tow, 1962
Amick	DE-168	Scrapped, 1989 (as Philippine: BRP Datu Sikatuna (PF-5))
Andres	DE-45	Sold for scrap, 1946
Arthur L. Bristol	DE-281	Sold for scrap, 1965
Atherton	DE-169	Active, (as Philippine: BRP Rajah Humabon (PF-11))
Austin	DE-15	Scrapped, 1947
Badger	DE-1071	Sunk as a target, 1998
Bagley	DE-1069	Recycled, 2000
Baker	DE-190	Sunk as a target, 1970 (as French: Malgache (F724))
Balduck	DE-716	Sold for scrap, 1976
Bangust	DE-739	Scrapped, 1979 (as Peru: BAP Castilla (F-61))
Barber	DE-161	Struck, 2001 (as Mexico: ARM Coahuila (E21))
Barbey	DE-1088	Active, (as Taiwan: Hwai Yang (FFG-937))
Baron	DE-166	Struck, 1990 (as Uruguay: ROU Uruguay (DE-1))
Barr	DE-576	Sunk as a target, 1963
Bassett	DE-672	Active (as Columbia: ARC Almirante Tono (DT-04))
Bates	DE-68	Sunk by Kamikazes, 1945
Bauer	DE-1025	
Bayntun	BDE-1	
Bazely	BDE-2	
Bebas	DE-10	
Begor	DE-711	
Belet	DE-599	
Benner	DE-551	Cancelled
Berry	BDE-3	
Beverly W. Reid	DE-722	
Eisele	DE-75	To Royal Navy as HMS Bickerton (K466)
Bivin	DE-536	
Blackwood	BDE-4	
Blair	DE-147	
Blakely	DE-1072	
Blessman	DE-69	
Booth	DE-170	
Borum	DE-790	
Bostwick	DE-103	
Bowen	DE-1079	
Bowers	DE-637	
Brackett	DE-41	
Bradley	DE-1041	
Bray	DE-709	
Breeman	DE-104	
Brennan	DE-13	
Brewton	DE-1086	
Bridget	DE-1024	
Bright	DE-747	
Brister	DE-327	
Brock	DE-234	
Bronstein	DE-189	
Bronstein	DE-1037	
Brough	DE-148	
Brumby	DE-1044	
Buckley	DE-51	
Bull	DE-52	
Bull	DE-693	
Bullen	DE-78	To Royal Navy as HMS Bullen (K469)
Bunch	DE-694	
Burden R. Hastings	DE-19	
Burdo	DE-717	
Burges	BDE-12	
Burke	DE-215	
Burrows	DE-105	
Byron	DE-79	To Royal Navy as HMS Byron (K508)
Cabana	DE-260	
Calcaterra	DE-390	
Camp	DE-251	
Canfield	DE-262	
Cannon	DE-99	
Capodanno	DE-1093	
Carlson	DE-9	
Carpellotti	DE-548	Cancelled
Carpellotti	DE-720	Re-designated as APD-136
Carroll	DE-171	
Carter	DE-112	
Cates	DE-763	
Cavallaro	DE-712	
Cecil J. Doyle	DE-368	
Chaffee	DE-230	
Chambers	DE-391	
Charles Berry	DE-1035	
Charles E. Brannon	DE-446	
Charles J. Kimmel	DE-584	
Charles Lawrence	DE-53	
Charles R. Greer	DE-23	
Charles R. Ware	DE-547	Cancelled
Chase	DE-158	
Chatelain	DE-149	
Chester T. O'Brien	DE-421	
Christopher	DE-100	
Clarence L. Evans	DE-113	
Claud Jones	DE-1033	
Cloues	DE-265	
Coates	DE-685	
Cockrill	DE-398	
Cofer	DE-208	
Coffman	DE-191	
Conklin	DE-439	
Conn	DE-80	
Connole	DE-1056	
Connolly	DE-306	
Cook	DE-714	
Cook	DE-1083	
Coolbaugh	DE-217	
Cooner	DE-172	
Corbesier	DE-106	
Corbesier	DE-438	
Cosby	DE-94	
Cotton	DE-81	
Courtney	DE-1021	
Cranstoun	DE-82	
Cread	DE-227	
Creamer	DE-308	Cancelled
Cromwell	DE-1014	
Cronin	DE-107	
Cronin	DE-704	
Crosley	DE-108	
Crosley	DE-226	
Cross	DE-448	
Crouter	DE-11	
Crowley	DE-303	
Cubitt	DE-83	
Currier	DE-700	
Curtis W. Howard	DE-752	Cancelled
Curzon	DE-84	
Dakins	DE-85	
Dale W. Peterson	DE-337	
Damon Cummings	DE-756	Cancelled
Damon M. Cummings	DE-643	
Daniel	DE-335	
Daniel A. Joy	DE-585	
Daniel T. Griffin	DE-54	
Darby	DE-218	
Davidson	DE-1045	
Day	DE-225	
Dealey	DE-1006	
Deane	DE-86	
Decker	DE-47	
Deede	DE-263	
Delbert W. Halsey	DE-310	Cancelled
DeLong	DE-684	
Dempsey	DE-26	
Dempsey	DE-267	
Dennis	DE-405	
Dennis J. Buckley	DE-553	Cancelled
Diachenko	DE-690	
Dionne	DE-261	
Dobler	DE-48	
Doherty	DE-14	
Don O. Woods	DE-721	
Donald B. Beary	DE-1085	
Donaldson	DE-44	
Donaldson	DE-55	To Royal Navy as HMS Byard (K315)
Donald W. Wolf	DE-713	
Doneff	DE-49	
Donnell	DE-56	
Douglas A. Munro	DE-422	
Douglas L. Howard	DE-138	
Downes	DE-1070	
Doyle C. Barnes	DE-353	
Drury	BDE-46	
Duffy	DE-27	
Duffy	DE-268	
Dufilho	DE-423	
Durant	DE-389	
Durik	DE-666	
Earheart	DE-603	
Earl K. Olsen	DE-765	
Earl V. Johnson	DE-702	
Earle B. Hall	DE-597	
Ebert	DE-74	To Royal Navy as HMS Bentley (K465)
Ebert	DE-768	
Edgar G. Chase	DE-16	
Edmonds	DE-406	
Edsall	DE-129	
Edward C. Daly	DE-17	
Edward H. Allen	DE-531	
Edward McDonnell	DE-1043	
Edwin A. Howard	DE-346	
Eichenberger	DE-202	
Eisele	DE-34	
Eisner	DE-192	
Eisner	DE-269	
Ekins	DE-87	
Elden	DE-264	
Eldridge	DE-173	
Elmer Montgomery	DE-1082	
Ely	DE-309	Cancelled
Emery	DE-28	
England	DE-635	
Engstrom	DE-50	
Enright	DE-216	
Essington	DE-67	
Eugene A. Greene	DE-549	Cancelled
Eugene E. Elmore	DE-686	
Evans	DE-1023	
Evarts	DE-5	
Everett F. Larson	DE-554	Cancelled
Eversole	DE-404	
Fair	DE-35	
Falgout	DE-324	
Fanning	DE-1076	
Farquhar	DE-139	
Fechteler	DE-157	
Fessenden	DE-142	
Fieberling	DE-640	
Finch	DE-328	
Finnegan	DE-307	
Fiske	DE-143	
Fitzroy	DE-88	
Flaherty	DE-135	
Fleming	DE-32	
Fleming	DE-271	
Fogg	DE-57	
Foreman	DE-633	
Formoe	DE-509	
Formore	DE-58	
Forster	DE-334	
Foss	DE-59	
Fowler	DE-222	
Frament	DE-677	
Francis Hammond	DE-1067	
Francis M. Robinson	DE-220	
Francovich	DE-379	Cancelled
Francovich	DE-606	
Frederick C. Davis	DE-136	
French	DE-367	
Frost	DE-144	
Frybarger	DE-705	
Gandy	DE-764	
Gantner	DE-60	
Garcia	DE-1040	
Garfield Thomas	DE-193	
Gary	DE-326	
Gaynier	DE-751	
Gendreau	DE-639	
Gentry	DE-349	
George	DE-276	
George	DE-697	
George A. Johnson	DE-583	
George E. Davis	DE-357	
George M. Campbell	DE-773	Cancelled
George W. Ingram	DE-62	
Gillette	DE-270	
Gillette	DE-681	
Gilligan	DE-508	
Gilmore	DE-18	
Glover	DE-1098	Number 1098 being re-used
Goss	DE-444	
Gosselin	DE-710	
Grady	DE-445	
Gray	DE-1054	
Greenwood	DE-679	
Greiner	DE-37	
Griswold	DE-7	
Groves	DE-543	Cancelled
Gunason	DE-795	
Gustafson	DE-182	
Gyatt	DE-550	Cancelled
Haas	DE-424	
Haines	DE-792	
Halloran	DE-305	
Halsted	DE-91	
Hammann	DE-131	
Hammerberg	DE-1015	
Hanna	DE-449	
Hargood	DE-573	
Harmon	DE-72	
Harmon	DE-678	
Harold C. Thomas	DE-21	
Harold E. Holt	DE-1074	
Harold J. Ellison	DE-545	Cancelled
Harry L. Corl	DE-598	
Hartley	DE-1029	
Harveson	DE-316	
Haverfield	DE-393	
Hayter	DE-212	
Hemminger	DE-746	
Henry R. Kenyon	DE-683	
Henry W. Tucker	DE-377	Cancelled
Hepburn	DE-1055	
Herbert C. Jones	DE-137	
Herzog	DE-178	
Herzog	DE-277	
Heyliger	DE-510	
Hilbert	DE-742	
Hill	DE-141	
Hissem	DE-400	
Hodges	DE-231	
Holder	DE-401	
Hollis	DE-794	
Holmes	DE-572	
Holt	DE-706	
Holton	DE-703	
Hooper	DE-1026	
Hopping	DE-155	
Horace A. Bass	DE-691	
Hoste	DE-521	
Hotham	DE-574	
Hova	DE-110	
Howard D. Crow	DE-252	
Howard F. Clark	DE-533	
Hubbard	DE-211	
Hunter Marshall	DE-602	
Hurst	DE-250	
Huse	DE-145	
Inch	DE-146	
Inglis	DE-525	
Inman	DE-526	
Ira Jeffery	DE-63	
J. Douglas Blackwood	DE-219	
J. R. Y. Blakely	DE-140	
J. Richard Ward	DE-243	
Jaccard	DE-355	
Jack C. Robinson	DE-671	
Jack Miller	DE-410	
Jack W. Wilke	DE-800	
Jacob Jones	DE-130	
James E. Craig	DE-201	
Janssen	DE-396	
Jenks	DE-665	
Jesse L. Brown	DE-1089	
Jesse Rutherford	DE-347	
Jobb	DE-707	
John C. Butler	DE-339	
John J. Powers	DE-528	
John J. Van Buren	DE-753	Cancelled
John L. Williamson	DE-370	
John M. Bermingham	DE-530	
John P. Gray	DE-673	
John Q. Roberts	DE-235	
John R. Perry	DE-1034	
John Willis	DE-1027	
Johnnie Hutchins	DE-360	
Jordan	DE-204	
Joseph E. Campbell	DE-70	
Joseph E. Connolly	DE-450	
Joseph Hewes	DE-1078	
Joseph M. Auman	DE-674	
Joyce	DE-317	
Julius A. Raven	DE-600	
Keith	DE-241	
Kendall C. Campbell	DE-443	
Kenneth D. Bailey	DE-552	Cancelled
Kenneth M. Willett	DE-354	
Kephart	DE-207	
Keppler	DE-311	Cancelled
Keppler	DE-375	Cancelled
Key	DE-348	
Kingsmill	DE-280	
Kinzer	DE-232	
Kirk	DE-1087	
Kirkpatrick	DE-318	
Kirwin	DE-229	
Kleinsmith	DE-376	
Kleinsmith	DE-718	
Kline	DE-687	
Knox	DE-1052	
Knudson	DE-591	
Koelsch	DE-1049	
Koiner	DE-331	
Kretchmer	DE-329	
Kyne	DE-744	
La Prade	DE-409	
Lake	DE-301	
Lamons	DE-64	
Lamons	DE-743	
Lang	DE-1060	
Laning	DE-159	
Lansing	DE-388	
Lawford	DE-516	
Lawrence C. Taylor	DE-415	
Lawson	DE-518	
Le Ray Wilson	DE-414	
Lee Fox	DE-65	
LeHardy	DE-20	
Leland E. Thomas	DE-420	
Leopold	DE-319	
Leslie L.B. Knox	DE-580	
Lester	DE-1022	
Levy	DE-162	
Lewis	DE-535	
Liddle	DE-76	To Royal Navy as HMS Bligh (K467)
Liddle	DE-206	
Lloyd	DE-209	
Lloyd E. Acree	DE-356	
Lloyd Thomas	DE-312	Cancelled
Lloyd Thomas	DE-374	Cancelled
Lockwood	DE-1064	
Loeser	DE-680	
Loring	DE-520	
Lough	DE-586	
Louis	DE-517	
Lovelace	DE-198	
Lovering	DE-39	
Lovering	DE-272	
Lowe	DE-325	
Loy	DE-160	
Lyman	DE-302	
Mack	DE-358	
Major	DE-796	
Maloy	DE-791	
Manlove	DE-36	
Manners	DE-523	
Manning	DE-199	
Marchand	DE-249	
Marocain	DE-109	
Marsh	DE-699	
Martin	DE-30	
Martin H. Ray	DE-338	
Marts	DE-174	
Marvin Shields	DE-1066	
Mason	DE-529	One of 2 USN ships with a nearly all African-American crew in WW2
Maurice J. Manuel	DE-351	
McAnn	DE-73	To Royal Navy as HMS Balfour (K464)
McAnn	DE-179	
McCandless	DE-1084	
McClelland	DE-750	
McCloy	DE-1038	
McConnell	DE-163	
McCoy Reynolds	DE-440	
McGinty	DE-365	
McMorris	DE-1036	
McNulty	DE-581	
Melvin R. Nawman	DE-416	
Menges	DE-320	
Merrill	DE-392	
Metivier	DE-582	
Meyerkord	DE-1058	
Micka	DE-176	
Miller	DE-1091	
Mills	DE-383	
Milton Lewis	DE-772	Cancelled
Mitchell	DE-43	
Moinester	DE-1097	
Moore	DE-240	
Moorsom	DE-522	
Mosley	DE-321	
Mounsey	DE-524	
Muir	DE-770	
Myers	DE-595	
Myles C. Fox	DE-546	Cancelled
Naifeh	DE-352	
Narborough	DE-569	
Neal A. Scott	DE-769	
Neuendorf	DE-200	
Neunzer	DE-150	
Newell	DE-322	
Newman	DE-205	
Oberrender	DE-344	
O'Callahan	DE-1051	
Odum	DE-670	
O'Flaherty	DE-340	
Oliver Mitchell	DE-417	
O'Neill	DE-188	
O'Reilly	DE-330	
Osberg	DE-538	
Osmus	DE-701	
Osterhaus	DE-164	
Oswald	DE-71	
Oswald	DE-767	
Oswald A. Powers	DE-542	Cancelled
O'Toole	DE-274	
O'Toole	DE-527	
Otter	DE-210	
Otterstetter	DE-244	
Ouellett	DE-1077	
Parks	DE-165	
Parle	DE-708	
Pasley/Lindsay	DE-519	
Patterson	DE-1061	
Paul	DE-1080	
Paul G. Baker	DE-642	
Paul G. Baker	DE-755	Cancelled
Pavlic	DE-669	
Peiffer	DE-588	
Pennewill	DE-175	
Peterson	DE-152	
Pettit	DE-253	
Pharris	DE-1094	
Pillsbury	DE-133	
Poole	DE-151	
Pope	DE-134	
Pratt	DE-363	
Presley	DE-371	
Price	DE-332	
Pride	DE-323	
Raby	DE-698	
Rall	DE-304	
Ramsden	DE-382	
Rathburne	DE-1057	
Ray K. Edwards	DE-237	
Raymond	DE-341	
Raymon W. Herndon	DE-688	
Reasoner	DE-1063	
Redmill	DE-89	
Rednour	DE-592	
Reeves	DE-156	
Register	DE-233	
Retalick	DE-90	
Reuben James	DE-153	
Reybold	DE-177	
Reybold	DE-275	
Reynolds	DE-42	
Rhodes	DE-384	
Rich	DE-695	
Richard M. Rowell	DE-403	
Richard S. Bull	DE-402	
Richard W. Suesens	DE-342	
Richey	DE-385	
Ricketts	DE-254	
Riddle	DE-185	
Riley	DE-579	
Rinehart	DE-196	
Ringness	DE-590	
Riou	DE-92	
Rizzi	DE-537	
Roark	DE-1053	
Robert Brazier	DE-345	
Robert E. Peary	DE-132	
Robert E. Peary	DE-1073	
Robert F. Keller	DE-419	
Robert I. Paine	DE-578	
Roberts	DE-749	
Roche	DE-197	
Rogers Blood	DE-555	Cancelled
Rogers Blood	DE-605	
Rolf	DE-362	
Rombach	DE-364	
Rowley	DE-95	
Roy O. Hale	DE-336	
Ruchamkin	DE-228	
Rudderow	DE-224	
Runels	DE-793	
Rupert	DE-96	
Russell M. Cox	DE-774	Cancelled
Rutherford	DE-93	
Sample	DE-1048	
Samuel B. Roberts	DE-413	
Samuel S. Miles	DE-183	
Sanders	DE-273	
Sanders	DE-40	
Savage	DE-386	
Schmitt	DE-676	
Scott	DE-214	
Scribner	DE-689	
Scroggins	DE-799	
Sederstrom	DE-31	
Seid	DE-256	
Sellstrom	DE-255	
Seymour	DE-98	
Sheehan	DE-541	Cancelled
Shelton	DE-407	
Silverstein	DE-534	
Sims	DE-154	
Slater	DE-766	
Sloat	DE-245	
Smartt	DE-257	
Snowden	DE-246	
Snyder	DE-745	
Solar	DE-221	
Somali	DE-111	
Spangenberg	DE-223	
Spangler	DE-696	
Spragge	DE-563	
Stadtfeld	DE-29	
Stafford	DE-411	
Stanton	DE-247	
Stayner	DE-564	
Steele	DE-8	
Stein	DE-1065	
Steinaker	DE-452	Cancelled
Stern	DE-187	
Stewart	DE-238	
Stockdale	DE-399	
Stockham	DE-97	
Straub	DE-77	To Royal Navy as HMS Braithwaite (K468)
Straub	DE-181	
Straus	DE-408	
Strickland	DE-333	
Sturtevant	DE-239	
Sutton	DE-286	Cancelled
Sutton	DE-771	
Swasey	DE-248	
Swearer	DE-186	
Swenning	DE-394	
Tabberer	DE-418	
Tatum	DE-789	
Taussig	DE-1030	
Thaddeus Parker	DE-369	
Thomas	DE-102	
Thomas C. Hart	DE-1092	
Thomas F. Nickel	DE-587	
Thomas J. Gary	DE-61	
Thomason	DE-203	
Thornborough	DE-565	
Thornhill	DE-195	
Tills	DE-748	
Tinsman	DE-589	
Tisdale	DE-33	
Tisdale	DE-278	
Tollberg	DE-593	
Tomich	DE-242	
Torrington	DE-568	
Traw	DE-350	
Trippe	DE-1075	
Trollope	DE-566	
Truett	DE-1095	
Trumpeter	DE-180	
Trumpeter	DE-279	
Truxtun	DE-282	
Tweedy	DE-532	
Tyler	DE-567	
Ulvert M. Moore	DE-442	
Underhill	DE-682	
Upham	DE-283	
Valdez	DE-1096	
Vammen	DE-644	
Van Hoorhis	DE-1028	
Vance	DE-387	
Vandivier	DE-540	
Varian	DE-798	
Voge	DE-1047	
Vogelgesang	DE-284	Cancelled
Vreeland	DE-1068	
Wagner	DE-539	
Waldegrave	DE-570	
Walsh	DE-601	
Walter B. Cobb	DE-596	
Walter C. Wann	DE-412	
Walter S. Brown	DE-258	
Walter S. Gorka	DE-604	
Walter X. Young	DE-715	
Walter X. Young	DE-723	
Walton	DE-361	
Wantuck	DE-692	
Waterman	DE-740	
Weaver	DE-741	
Weber	DE-675	
Weeden	DE-797	
Weeks	DE-285	Cancelled
Weiss	DE-378	
Weiss	DE-719	
Wesson	DE-184	
Whipple	DE-1062	
Whitaker	DE-571	
Whitehurst	DE-634	
Whitman	DE-24	
Wileman	DE-22	
Wilhoite	DE-397	
Willard Keith	DE-754	Cancelled
Willard Keith	DE-314	Cancelled
William C. Cole	DE-641	
William C. Lawe	DE-313	Cancelled
William C. Lawe	DE-373	Cancelled
William C. Miller	DE-259	
William J. Pattison	DE-594	
William M. Hobby	DE-236	
William M. Wood	DE-287	Cancelled
William M. Wood	DE-557	Cancelled
William R. Rush	DE-288	Cancelled
William R. Rush	DE-556	Cancelled
William S. Sims	DE-1059	
William Seiverling	DE-441	
William T. Powell	DE-213	
Williams	DE-290	Cancelled
Williams	DE-372	
Willis	DE-395	
Willmarth	DE-638	
Wingfield	DE-194	
Wintle	DE-25	
Wintle	DE-266	
Wiseman	DE-667	
Witter	DE-636	
Woodrow R. Thompson	DE-451	Cancelled
Woodson	DE-359	
Wyffels	DE-6	
Wyman	DE-38	
Yokes	DE-668	
	DE-114 to DE-128	Cancelled Cannon-class vessels, unnamed
	DE-289	Cancelled Rudderow-class vessel, unnamed
	DE-291 to DE-300	Cancelled Rudderow-class vessels, unnamed
	DE-315	Cancelled Evarts-class vessel, unnamed
	DE-380 to DE-381	Cancelled John C. Butler-class vessels, unnamed
	DE-425 to DE-437	Cancelled John C. Butler-class vessels, unnamed
	DE-453 to DE-507	Cancelled John C. Butler-class vessels, unnamed
	DE-511 to DE-515	Cancelled John C. Butler-class vessels, unnamed
	DE-558 to DE-562	Cancelled John C. Butler-class vessels, unnamed
	DE-607 to DE-632	Cancelled Rudderow-class vessels, unnamed
	DE-645 to DE-664	Cancelled Rudderow-class vessels, unnamed
	DE-724 to DE-738	Cancelled Rudderow-class vessels, unnamed
	DE-757 to DE-762	Cancelled Cannon-class vessels, unnamed
	DE-775 to DE-788	Cancelled Cannon-class vessels, unnamed
	DE-801 to DE-904	Cancelled John C. Butler-class vessels, unnamed
	DE-905 to DE-1005	Cancelled Rudderow-class vessels, unnamed
	DE-1007 to DE-1013	Le Normand-class, paid for by United States Navy and built in France to a French design for the Marine Nationale
	DE-1016 to DE-1019	Le Corse-class, paid for by United States Navy and built in France to a French design for the Marine Nationale
	DE-1020	Canopo-class, paid for by the United States Navy and built in Italy to an Italian design for the Italian Navy
	DE-1031	Canopo-class, paid for by the United States Navy and built in Italy to an Italian design for the Italian Navy
	DE-1032	NRP Pêro Escobar, paid for by the United States Navy and built in Italy to an Italian design for the Portuguese Navy
	DE-1039	Admiral Pereira da Silva-class, paid for by the United States Navy and built in Italy to an Italian design for the Portuguese Navy
	DE-1042	Admiral Pereira da Silva-class, paid for by the United States Navy and built in Italy to an Italian design for the Portuguese Navy
	DE-1046	Admiral Pereira da Silva-class, paid for by the United States Navy and built in Italy to an Italian design for the Portuguese Navy
	DE-1098 to DE-1100	Cancelled Knox-class vessels, unnamed
	DE-1101	Cancelled, unnamed. Planned as experimental gas turbine ship.
	DE-1102 to DE-1107	Cancelled Knox-class vessels, unnamed

== Guided missile Destroyer Escorts (DEG) ==
- (DEG-1) Brooke
- (DEG-2) Ramsey
- (DEG-3) Schofield
- (DEG-4) Talbot
- (DEG-5) Richard L. Page
- (DEG-6) Julius A. Furer
- DEG-7 through 13 The ships were redesignated FFG, a patrol frigate design would be re-designated the FFG-7 Oliver Hazard Perry class frigate.

== Radar picket Destroyer Escorts (DER) ==
During World War II seven DEs would be converted to this role, and during the Cold War another 36 would be converted. All would be replaced by more modern radar by 1965.

== High speed transports (APD) ==
During World War II 94 DEs were converted to High Speed Transports for amphibious assaults and raids; in 1969 all surviving ships would be reclassified as Fast Amphibious Transports (LPR).

== See also ==
- Captain class frigates - Captain class was the name the Royal Navy gave to Destroyer escorts.
- List of frigate classes
- List of frigates of the United States Navy - subset of destroyer escorts reclassed as frigates (those with hull numbers DE/FF 1037 and higher plus all DEG/FFGs) because of the United States Navy 1975 ship reclassification
- High-speed transport
- Crosley-class high speed transport - APDs converted from Rudderow-class DEs
- List of United States Navy amphibious warfare ships § High-speed Transport (APD)
- List of United States Navy amphibious warfare ships § Amphibious Transport, Small (LPR) - APDs reclassed as LPRs in 1969
- List of patrol vessels of the United States Navy § Patrol frigate (PF)
- List of United States Navy ships
- List of United States Navy losses in World War II § Destroyer escorts (DE) - abbreviated list
- List of U.S. Navy ships sunk or damaged in action during World War II § Destroyer, escort vessel (DE) - detailed list
- Modern naval tactics
- Ship Characteristics Board - aka SCB
- Tacoma-class frigates (PF) - U.S. ships comparable to destroyer escorts but built to commercial rather than naval shipbuilding standards. Those transferred to the Royal Navy were given the name of Colony-class frigates
