= USS James E. Craig =

Buckley-class destroyer escort

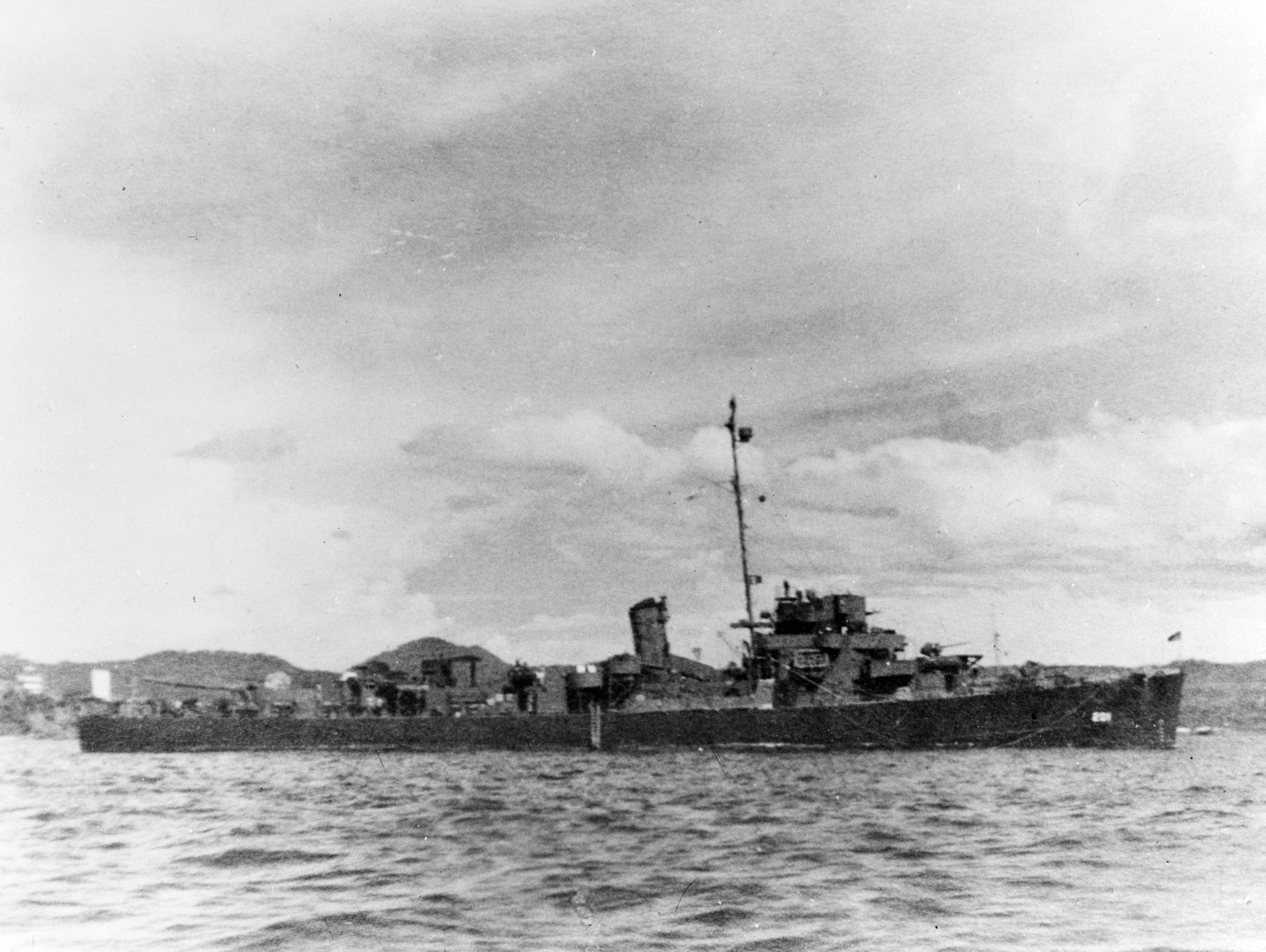

History

United States
- Name: USS James E. Craig
- Namesake: James Edwin Craig
- Ordered: 1942
- Builder: Charleston Navy Yard
- Laid down: 15 April 1943
- Launched: 22 July 1943
- Commissioned: 11 November 1943
- Decommissioned: 2 July 1946
- Stricken: 30 June 1968
- Honors and awards: 4 battle stars (World War II)
- Fate: Sunk as target off California, February 1969

General characteristics
- Class & type: Buckley-class destroyer escort
- Displacement: 1,400 long tons (1,422 t) light; 1,740 long tons (1,768 t) standard
- Length: 306 ft (93 m)
- Beam: 37 ft (11 m)
- Draft: 9 ft 6 in (2.90 m) standard; 11 ft 3 in (3.43 m) full load
- Propulsion: 2 × boilers; General Electric turbo-electric drive; 12,000 shp (8.9 MW); 2 × solid manganese-bronze 3,600 lb (1,600 kg) 3-bladed propellers, 8 ft 6 in (2.59 m) diameter, 7 ft 7 in (2.31 m) pitch; 2 × rudders; 359 tons fuel oil
- Speed: 23 knots (43 km/h; 26 mph)
- Range: 3,700 nmi (6,900 km) at 15 kn (28 km/h; 17 mph); 6,000 nmi (11,000 km) at 12 kn (22 km/h; 14 mph)
- Complement: 15 officers, 198 men
- Armament: 3 × 3-inch/50-caliber guns; 1 × quad 1.1-inch/75-caliber gun; 8 × single 20 mm guns; 1 × triple 21 inch (533 mm) torpedo tubes; 1 × Hedgehog anti-submarine mortar; 8 × K-gun depth charge projectors; 2 × depth charge tracks

USS James E. Craig (DE-201) was a Buckley-class destroyer escort in service with the United States Navy from 1943 to 1946. She was sunk as a target in 1969.

== History ==
The destroyer escort was named in honor of Lieutenant Commander James Edwin Craig (1901–1941), who was killed in action aboard USS Pennsylvania during the Japanese attack on Pearl Harbor on 7 December 1941. James E. Craig was launched on 22 July 1943, by Charleston Navy Yard; sponsored by Mrs. J. E. Craig, widow of Lieutenant Commander Craig; and commissioned on 1 November 1943.

The new destroyer escort departed the Charleston Navy Yard on 23 November for shakedown off Bermuda and returned to the yard on 25 December for alterations. She sailed on 4 January 1944 for Panama via the Windward Passage. In the Caribbean she joined her sister ships USS Lovelace and USS Samuel S. Miles on 7 January to escort two troop transports. She transited the Panama Canal on 8 January.

In company with other destroyer escorts, James E. Craig steamed from Balboa, Panama, on 14 January escorting SS Azalea City to Nouméa, New Caledonia. Stopping at Bora Bora on 27 January, James E. Craig and Azalea City departed the 28th and two days later encountered a typhoon which pounded the ships with 50-foot (15 m) waves. They passed through a second typhoon on 4 February with winds of 80 knots (92 mph; 148 km/h). On 5 February they were ordered to Espiritu Santo, and arrived the following day.

=== New Guinea campaign ===
James E. Craig departed Espiritu Santo on 13 February with three other escorts and seven merchant ships bound for Guadalcanal. Upon arrival the 16th, she began anti-submarine patrol off Lunga Point. She departed for Espiritu Santo on 23 February, escorting two merchant ships and continued her escort duty between Guadalcanal and Espiritu Santo for several weeks. On 15 March, she escorted the oiler Cacapon from Espiritu Santo to a fueling rendezvous with Task Force 36, which was engaged in operations against Kavieng, New Ireland, and Emirau Island, "the last link in the ring around Rabaul." Refueling completed the 25th, James E. Craig and Cacapon joined other escorts and tankers and returned to Espirito Santo.

On 31 March, James E. Craig departed Espiritu Santo in company with Escort Division 37, including Lovelace, Manning, Neuendorf and Eichenberger. Stopping at Tulagi in the Solomons, 2 to 4 April, they sailed the 5th for New Guinea, where James E. Craig was to see action for five months.

On 26 April, James E. Craig joined a convoy of escorts and transports bound from Cape Sudest to Humboldt Bay to support the invasion of Hollandia, underway since the 22nd. The convoy arrived on 3 May; and after discharging the transports, the escorts returned to Cape Sudest the 5th. James E. Craig, now under the command of Lieutenant Commander Edward F. Andrews, steamed on 13 May on escort duty to Humboldt Bay via Aitape, arrived the 17th, and immediately joined an attack convoy bound for Wakde Airfield, Sawar Airfield and Sarmi, west of Hollandia. She returned the same day to Humboldt Bay, where she continued her patrols and escort duty. She bombarded enemy troop concentrations between Wakde and Sarmi on the 27th and returned to Cape Cretin via Humboldt Bay on the 31st.

James E. Craig returned to Humboldt Bay on 6 June to prepare for the bitter Battle of Biak. With six other escorts, she accompanied the convoy and supported the landing operations on 12 June. Departing the same day, the convoy returned to Humboldt Bay the 14th; and James E. Craig continued as escort to Cape Cretin, where she arrived three days later.

During the remainder of June and through July, James E. Craig continued escort and anti-submarine duties along the northern coast of New Guinea. While on ASW operations off Wakde, she conducted prolonged, successful bombardments of enemy supply depots at Sawar, 11–12 July, expending some 3,300 rounds of 3-inch and 1.1-inch shellfire. A week later, she arrived at Noemfoor Island, southwest of Biak, and escorted convoys 18 to 23 July on a triangular route from Noemfoor to Humboldt Bay via Biak. Arriving at Madang, Astrolabe Bay, on 23 July for overhaul, James E. Craig returned to Humboldt Bay to resume her escort and ASW operations.

During August, she plied the coastal waters off New Guinea from Cape Cretin to Wakde; then devoted the six weeks to escort and anti-submarine patrol between Cape Cretin, Manus Island, and Humboldt Bay. On 11 October, she joined a convoy at Ulithi, then sailed for the Palaus on the 18th and arrived Peleliu two days later for ASW operations. She returned to Manus the 25th for repairs.

=== Philippines campaign ===
Back at Humboldt Bay on 14 November, she joined a large convoy of transports, amphibious craft, and escorts underway on the 17th for the Philippine Islands, to support the vital, Allied foothold on Leyte, established some four weeks earlier. The convoy of 75 ships and 9 escorts steamed northwestward and by dusk of the 23rd approached Leyte Gulf.

James E. Craig, returning from radar picket patrol to her assigned ASW station, made radar contact with six low-flying unidentified planes approaching from the south at approximately 190 knots (219 mph; 352 km/h). Soon her spotters observed "Jill" torpedo bombers 7 miles (11 km) out, closing at high speed. As the enemy aircraft broke into three groups in an attempt to "box the target," James E. Craig turned left full rudder to meet the attackers; and all guns which could bear commenced firing at the aircraft, still more than 2 miles (3 km) out. Four of the attackers began a run and launched their torpedoes at a range of 1,000–1,500 yards to port; as the ship turned, three torpedoes passed "close aboard to port" and almost parallel to her. Meanwhile, two aircraft commenced a run from the starboard side. Approaching almost directly from out of the sunset, one dropped a torpedo within a thousand yards which broached once before settling down on its run. As James E. Craig turned hard to starboard, the torpedo passed within 5 yards (5 m) astern. One of the attackers passed within 200 yards (200 m) of the ship, was hit by starboard 20 mm gunfire, and splashed after passing over frigate El Paso (PF-41).

The convoy stood into San Pedro Bay, Leyte, the following day, and remained at battle stations a greater part of the day to repel enemy aircraft which attempted to bomb the convoy. That night, the convoy and escorts reformed and departed for Humboldt Bay via the Palaus.

Upon arrival, James E. Craig received general maintenance and overhaul from destroyer tender Dobbin (AD-3) through 10 December. She spent the remainder of the month escorting fleet tankers and practicing anti-aircraft and night torpedo firing drills at Padaido, Dutch East Indies, and Humboldt Bay. On 28 December, Escort Division 37 departed Humboldt Bay with a convoy of tankers and merchant ships bound for Leyte, where they arrived on 1 January 1945.

==== Landings on Luzon ====
The following day, James E. Craig stood out for Mindoro Island to join Task Group 77.2, ordered to support landing operations on northern Luzon. Enemy reconnaissance planes maintained close surveillance; and late afternoon on 4 January an enemy kamikaze penetrated defenses and struck Ommaney Bay, causing her to burst into flame. After the conflagration got out of hand, the escort carrier's commander ordered abandon ship. James E. Craig assisted in rescue operations and, later that evening, proceeded with other escorts and tankers to Mindoro.

Standing into Mangarin Bay the following morning, James E. Craig commenced picket and ASW operations, which continued through the day and into the night, as the convoy departed Mangarin to maneuver off Mindoro during darkness. Designed to prevent enemy attack at night, the night maneuvers continued until the 10th, when the convoy remained at Mangarin Bay through the night.

James E. Craig resumed ASW operations at the harbor entrance for several days until troublesome submarine detection equipment forced her to retire to Mangarin Harbor on 14 January. She commenced anti-aircraft patrol for ships in anchorage and on 5 February returned to San Pedro Bay, Leyte, for repairs, thence to Humboldt Bay, New Guinea, arriving on 2 March.

==== Escort duties ====
Getting underway the following day, she returned to San Pedro Bay via Kossol Roads, Palaus. Upon arriving Leyte on 10 March, James E. Craig prepared for continued escort duties between San Pedro Bay and Manila, Manus, Humboldt Bay, and Kossol Roads. From 14 March to 21 May, she operated almost continuously on escort duty, and on the 21st she departed Leyte for Lingayen Gulf. Standing into San Fernando Harbor four days later, she commenced anti-submarine and escort patrols along the coast of Luzon that continued to 13 August when she departed for Manila. Once at Manila, she resumed ASW operations to the 27th; then, as escort in company with Eichenberger, she convoyed tugs and tows en route Okinawa. An impending typhoon disrupted the convoy on 1 September; high seas and 70-knot (81 mph; 130 km/h) winds scattered the ships and separated tugs from their tows. After the storm abated on 2 September, James E. Craig began search and rescue operations which continued to the 9th. Further typhoon warnings caused the ships to return to Subic Bay, Luzon, where the convoy anchored the following day.

=== Decommissioning ===
James E. Craig remained at Subic Bay until 1 October, when she steamed for the United States via Eniwetok and Pearl Harbor. She arrived San Diego on 5 November and decommissioned there on 2 July 1946. She was struck from the Navy List on 30 June 1968.

== Awards ==
James E. Craig received four battle stars for World War II service.
