= USS Wyffels =

Evarts-class destroyer escort

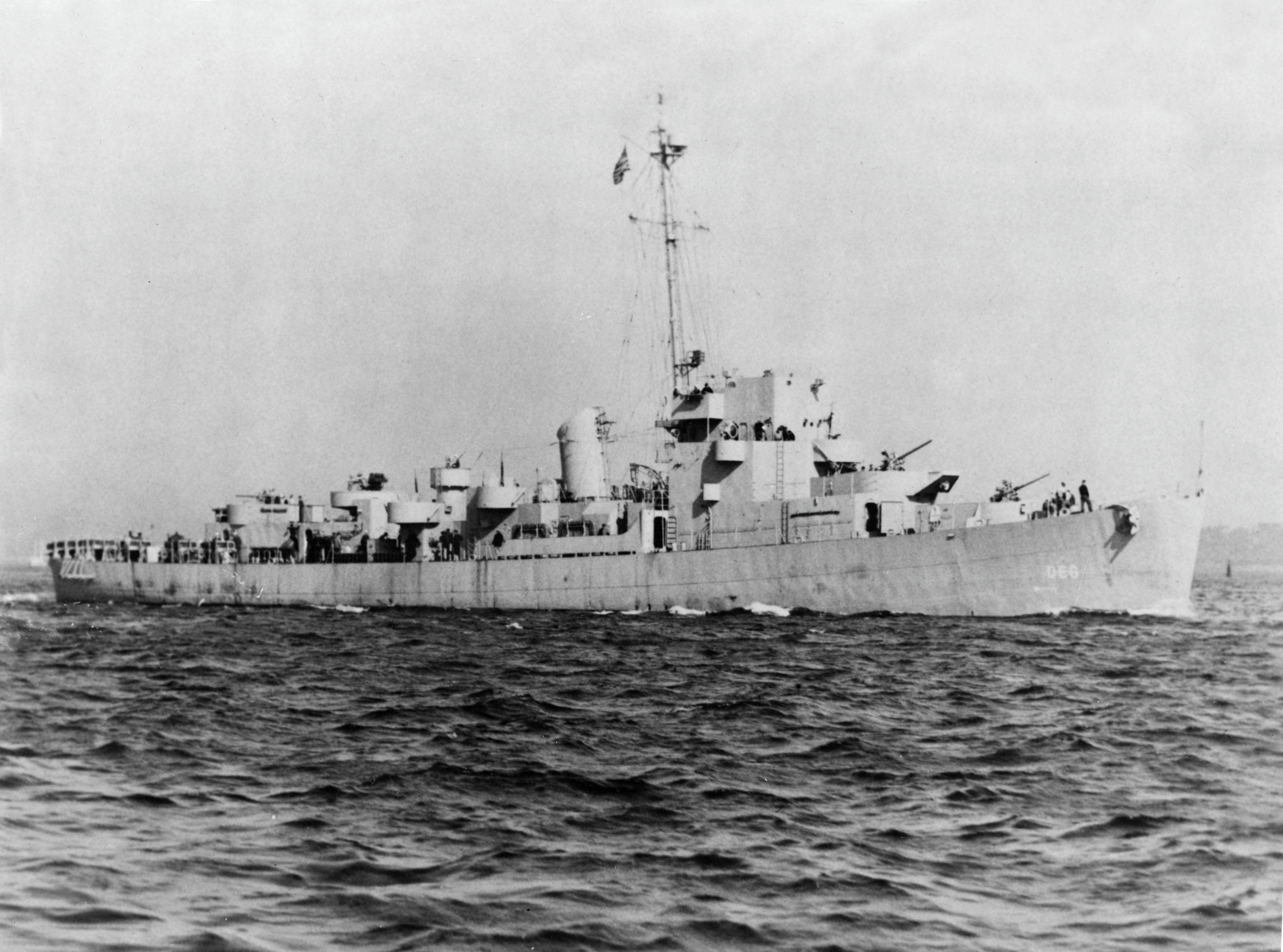
- USS Wyffels (DE-6) underway in April 1943

History

United States
- Name: Wyffels
- Namesake: Lawrence Edward Wyffels
- Ordered: as BDE-6
- Builder: Boston Navy Yard
- Laid down: 17 October 1942
- Launched: 7 December 1942
- Reclassified: DE-6, 25 January 1943
- Renamed: Wyffels 19 February 1943
- Commissioned: 15 April 1943
- Decommissioned: 28 August 1945
- Fate: transferred to Republic of China, 28 August 1945
- Stricken: 12 March 1948

Taiwan
- Name: Tai Kang
- Acquired: 28 August 1945
- Identification: Pennant number: F-21
- Fate: Sold for scrapping, 1972

General characteristics
- Class & type: Evarts-class destroyer escort
- Displacement: 1,140 tons
- Length: 289 ft 5 in (88.21 m)
- Beam: 35 ft 1 in (10.69 m)
- Draft: 8 ft 3 in (2.51 m)
- Speed: 19½ knots
- Complement: 198
- Armament: 3 3 in (76 mm)/50 guns, 4 1.1"/75 caliber gun, 2 40 mm., 9 20 mm., 3 dct., 8 dcp., 1 dcp. (hh.)

USS Wyffels (DE-6) was an Evarts-class destroyer escort in the United States Navy during World War II.

Intended for transfer to Great Britain, Wyffels was laid down as BDE-6 on 17 October 1942 at Charlestown, Massachusetts, by the Boston Navy Yard; launched on 7 December 1942; retained by the United States and redesignated DE-6 on 25 January 1943; renamed Wyffels on 19 February 1943, after Lawrence Wyffels, who was killed aboard USS Enterprise during the Battle of the Santa Cruz Islands. The ship was commissioned on 15 April 1943.

== Design ==
The Evarts-class destroyer escorts were 289 ft 5 in (88.21 m) long overall, and they had a beam of 35 ft 2 in (10.72 m). They had an average draft of 10 ft 1 in (3.07 m) at their full load displacement of 1,416 long tons (1,439 t). Each ship had a normal crew numbered 156 officers and sailors.

Wyffels was propelled by a pair of diesel motors manufactured by General Motors, which drove a pair of screw propellers. Her propulsion system was rated to produce 6,000 brake horsepower (4,500 kW) for a top speed of 19.5 knots (36.1 km/h; 22.4 mph). Oil storage amounted to between 131 and 197 long tons (133 and 200 t), which allowed a cruising radius of up to 6,000 nautical miles (11,000 km; 6,900 mi) at an economical pace of 10 knots (19 km/h; 12 mph).

The ship's armament consisted of a main battery of three 3-inch (76 mm) /50-caliber guns in individual pivot mounts, which could be used against air or surface targets. These were supported by a light anti-aircraft battery that initially consisted of four 1.1 in (28 mm) /75-caliber guns in a quadruple mount and nine 20 mm (0.79 in) Oerlikon guns. For attacks against submarines, the ship was equipped with a Hedgehog mortar, eight depth charge throwers, and two depth charge racks.

== Service history ==
The ship, originally designated BDE-6, was laid down at the Boston Navy Yard on 17 October 1942, intended for service with the British Royal Navy. She was launched on 7 December, and the US Navy decided to keep the ship for its own use, and the vessel was accordingly allocated the hull number DE-6 on 25 January 1943. The following month, on 19 February, the ship was renamed Wyffels after Lawrence Wyffels, a sailor who was killed aboard the aircraft carrier USS Enterprise at the Battle of the Santa Cruz Islands in October 1942. After completing fitting-out work, Wyffels was commissioned into active service with the US Navy on 15 April 1943. Sea trials were carried out quickly that month, allowing the ship to begin wartime operations.

=== United States Navy (1942–1945) ===
On 8 May 1943, Wyffels sailed from Boston for training exercises in the Caribbean Sea, which lasted through the rest of the month. She then moved back north to Norfolk, Virginia, in June; during this period, she was also dry-docked for maintenance. By 27 June, she was ready to begin her first escort mission with a convoy sailing across the Atlantic to the Mediterranean Sea. The convoy safely arrived in Casablanca, French Morocco, without incident, though the voyage back to the United States was marked by the detection of suspected U-boat contacts. Wyffels was detached from the convoy on 29 July to cover the oil tanker British Pride, which had suffered an engine breakdown and was temporarily immobilized. Wyffels patrolled around the tanker while repairs to her engines were made, and then escorted her back to join the rest of the convoy.

From August 1943-April 1945, Wyffels, with occasional interruptions for exercises off the New England coast, conducted 10 more successful circuit voyages escorting convoys to and from North Africa. On her Atlantic crossings, the ship acted as a versatile and valuable part of the Atlantic convoy system, marshalling reluctant merchantmen, protecting stragglers, and searching for the source of each sound contact which might, at any time, turn out to be a predatory German submarine. In winter, stormy weather and heavy seas slowed the awkward merchant ships and increased the number of stragglers, complicating the task of the escort vessels.

On 11 May 1944, Wyffels was escorting UGS-40, a convoy of 56 merchant ships bound for Bizerte, when she experienced her most perilous moments. Shortly after sunset, a task force order to go to general quarters jolted Wyffels from the normal routine of convoy duty. Ships of the escort began laying smoke, and soon Wyffels' radar picked up a group of approaching planes. After a tense, six-minute wait, the ominous calm of the Mediterranean night was broken as first Benson and then Evarts opened fire.

Moments later, seamen in Wyffels spotted the first wave of attacking planes as they came into view low over the water, some four miles away. Three of the aircraft veered off to make a run on the convoy at an altitude of about 200 feet (61 m). Wyffels opened fire as the planes passed down her port side and sped off toward the convoy's port quarter. Moments passed as the destroyer escort patrolled at full speed, her guns silent. An aerial attacker appeared out of the smoke, dropped an ill-aimed torpedo, and disappeared. Then, at 2124, Wyffels engaged a clearly visible Junkers bomber which approached the ship's starboard bow at an altitude of 100 feet (30 m). Amidst a telling crossfire from Wyffels and other members of the escort, the plane banked to the right, missing the forward part of the ship. Smoke poured from the attacker as it rapidly lost altitude and disappeared in a burst of black smoke.

Soon after, Wyffels took under fire another plane which emerged from the convoy's barrage and passed directly over the ship's forecastle and along her starboard side. The aircraft then continued on its way, apparently without having suffered serious damage. Other ships continued to fire for 10 minutes, but the raiders had departed without scoring a single hit on the convoy or its escort.

Through the final year of the war in Europe, Wyffels continued her protection of Atlantic convoys. On 13 April 1945, as Wyffels was en route home from what was to be her last wartime Atlantic convoy, the destroyer escort received word that President Franklin D. Roosevelt had died, and she lowered her colors to half mast. After repairs at Charleston later that month, she arrived at Miami on 11 May. In the following months, she operated off Florida and in the Bahamas, serving as a school ship training student crews in basic gunnery and antisubmarine warfare.

=== Republic of China Navy (1945–1972) ===
On 28 August 1945, she was decommissioned and leased to the Republic of China, which she served as Tai Kang. Wyffels was permanently transferred to the Republic of China Navy in February 1948 and was struck from the Navy list on 12 March 1948.

On 23 June 1954, She joined the blockade task force to capture and confiscate the civilian oil tanker Tuapse of the Soviet Union with kerosene passing the high sea of Balintang Channel at 19°35′00″N 120°39′00″E near Philippines eastbound toward the west Pacific Ocean, whereas the crew were detained in various time frames up to 34 years in captivity and certain deaths.

== Awards ==
- Combat Action Ribbon (retroactive)
- American Campaign Medal
- European-African-Middle Eastern Campaign Medal
- World War II Victory Medal
