= USS Walter S. Brown =

Evarts-class destroyer escort of the United States Navy

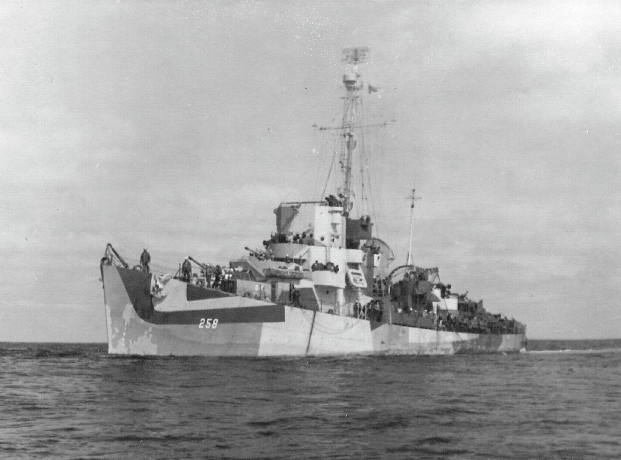
- Walter S. Brown at sea c. 1944

History

United States
- Name: USS Walter S. Brown
- Builder: Boston Navy Yard
- Laid down: 10 January 1943
- Launched: 22 February 1943
- Commissioned: 25 June 1943
- Decommissioned: 4 October 1945
- Stricken: 24 October 1945
- Honors and awards: 1 battle star (World War II)
- Fate: Sold for scrapping, 1946

General characteristics
- Type: Evarts-class destroyer escort
- Displacement: 1,140 long tons (1,158 t) standard; 1,430 long tons (1,453 t) full
- Length: 289 ft 5 in (88.21 m) o/a; 283 ft 6 in (86.41 m) w/l
- Beam: 35 ft 2 in (10.72 m)
- Draft: 11 ft (3.4 m) (max)
- Propulsion: 4 × General Motors Model 16-278A diesel engines with electric drive, 6,000 shp (4,474 kW); 2 screws
- Speed: 19 knots (35 km/h; 22 mph)
- Range: 4,150 nmi (7,690 km)
- Complement: 15 officers and 183 enlisted
- Armament: 3 × single 3"/50 Mk.22 dual purpose guns; 1 × quad 1.1"/75 Mk.2 AA gun; 9 × 20 mm Mk.4 AA guns; 1 × Hedgehog Projector Mk.10 (144 rounds); 8 × Mk.6 depth charge projectors; 2 × Mk.9 depth charge tracks

USS Walter S. Brown (DE-258) was an Evarts-class destroyer escort of the United States Navy during World War II. She was engaged in protecting convoys in the North Atlantic and Mediterranean.

== Design ==
The Evarts-class destroyer escorts were 289 ft 5 in (88.21 m) long overall, and they had a beam of 35 ft 2 in (10.72 m). They had an average draft of 10 ft 1 in (3.07 m) at their full load displacement of 1,416 long tons (1,439 t). Each ship had a normal crew numbered 156 officers and sailors.

Walter S. Brown was propelled by a pair of diesel motors manufactured by General Motors, which drove a pair of screw propellers. Her propulsion system was rated to produce 6,000 brake horsepower (4,500 kW) for a top speed of 19.5 knots (36.1 km/h; 22.4 mph). Oil storage amounted to between 131 and 197 long tons (133 and 200 t), which allowed a cruising radius of up to 6,000 nautical miles (11,000 km; 6,900 mi) at an economical pace of 10 knots (19 km/h; 12 mph).

The ship's armament consisted of a main battery of three 3-inch (76 mm) /50-caliber guns in individual pivot mounts, which could be used against air or surface targets. These were supported by a light anti-aircraft battery that initially consisted of four 1.1 in (28 mm) /75-caliber guns in a quadruple mount and nine 20 mm (0.79 in) Oerlikon guns. For attacks against submarines, the ship was equipped with a Hedgehog mortar, eight depth charge throwers, and two depth charge racks.

== Construction and commissioning ==
She was laid down on 10 January 1943 at Boston, Massachusetts, by the Boston Navy Yard; the ship was named for Walter Brown, who had been killed during the attack on Pearl Harbor. Walter S. Brown was launched on 22 February 1943, and commissioned on 25 June 1943.

== Service history ==
Following shakedown in Casco Bay, Maine, Walter S. Brown joined Escort Division CortDiv 5 and began escorting convoys across the Atlantic to Gibraltar and North African ports. By the spring of 1944 she had completed four such round-trip voyages. Interspersed between these voyages were periods of refresher training and availability. On 20 April 1944, Walter S. Brown arrived at Hampton Roads, Virginia, to join the screen of UGS-40. Three days later, this group which included some 65 merchantmen sailed for the Mediterranean. The screen, led by Campbell (WPG-32) contained three elderly flush-decked, four-pipe destroyers, six American destroyer escorts from CortDiv 5, and two French destroyer escorts.

Due to the success of recent attacks by the German Luftwaffe against Allied convoys in the western Mediterranean, UGS-40 sailed with an elaborate air defense plan, formulated by the convoy's screen commander, Comdr. Jesse C. Sowell, in Campbell. Practiced in Hampton Roads prior to the convoy's departure and as it crossed the Atlantic, these tactics were designed to meet mass aerial attacks by German aircraft carrying a variety of weapons ranging from bombs, to torpedoes, to radio-controlled glider bombs. Off Gibraltar the British anti-aircraft cruiser HMS Caledon, the escorts USS Wilhoite (DE-397) and Benson (DD-421) together with a British salvage tug and two American minesweepers carrying special apparatus to jam radar transmissions and thus confuse the German glider bombs joined the convoy.

On 9 May, the convoy passed through the Strait of Gibraltar without incident but, two days later, detected German "snoopers" trailing the convoy. In the next few hours, 10 successive shore-based fighter interception sorties including some conducted by British radar-equipped Beaufighters failed to drive off the enemy reconnaissance aircraft. The Germans maintained contact with the Allied ships. First alerted by shore-based radar "eyes", the escort screen went to general quarters at 1316 on 11 May, beginning the first of five successive "on again—off again" alerts. Walter S. Brown took station on the starboard bow of the convoy, some 6,000 yards (5,000 m) from the guide. In Campbell, the commander of the screen, Jesse Clyburn Sowell, enjoined his escorts to be especially vigilant and warned that a dusk attack was well within the realm of possibility. At 2025, radar noted the approach of enemy aircraft; and Sowell formed his charges into eight columns 1,000 yards (1,000 m) apart to allow for plenty of maneuvering room. As UGS-40 went to general quarters at 2043 that evening, Dobler (DE-48) and Ellis (DD-154) took stations on Walter S. Brown's flanks. When the enemy was reported 70 miles (110 km) north of Cape Corbelin, UGS-40 steered due east, through a smooth sea barely rippled by the light easterly airs, past Cape Bengut. Eleven minutes after sunset beneath a moonless, overcast sky, Walter S. Brown received orders to commence laying smoke.

A mixed force of Ju 88s, He 111s, and Do 217s approached from the stern of the convoy and broke into groups to attack from different points of the compass. Eight minutes after the initial sightings, the first German aircraft came in low and fast and entered Walter S. Brown's defense sector. The destroyer escort trained her guns on two aircraft, but these targets quickly slipped out of range. Two more, however, then came into range. Walter S. Brown commenced fire with her forward 20-millimeter and 3-inch battery and scored hits on both aircraft. One climbed for a moment into a steep, almost vertical bank but then faltered and crashed astern of the ship. Seconds later, a fifth aircraft bore in fast across the destroyer escort's bow and her starboard side and crossed over to port. Both Walter S. Brown and Dobler engaged the aircraft with their 20-millimeter and 1.1-inch (28 mm) guns resulting in its destruction. "Almost immediately", wrote Lt. Comdr. Louis B. Burdette, USNR, in his action report, "another single plane was reported coming in from ahead." Again all forward guns swung about, tracked their target, and opened fire as the aircraft swung right to attempt to launch a torpedo at the lead escorts. Despite the fact that the gunners could not hear the bearings being called out from the bridge over the sound-powered phones the fire from the Oerlikons deterred the aircraft from making an attack.

No ships were damaged in the attack. Walter S. Brown, which had engaged six enemy aircraft during the seven-minute battle, dropped astern at 2153 in company with Evarts (DE-5) the British tug Hengist and the French coastal escort Cimieterre to search for possible casualties. After a thorough search in which nothing was found the ships returned to the convoy. Of UGS-40's defense, Comdr. Sowell had high praise for the men and ships of the convoy's screen and was especially complimentary in judging Walter S. Brown's performance. "It is believed", he wrote, "that her performance, when coordinated with the other forces present, broke up the enemy's attack, disrupted his plans, and resulted in no Allied losses; whereas, the enemy suffered a heavy loss of planes."

For the remainder of the war in Europe, Walter S. Brown continued to escort convoys on round trips from the east coast of the United States to North African ports. Then, in the summer of 1945, she operated briefly in training exercises with submarines off the northeast coast of the United States. Decommissioned at the New York Naval Shipyard on 4 October 1945, Walter S. Brown was struck from the Navy List on 24 October 1945. Her scrapping by the New York Naval Shipyard was completed by 12 July 1946.

== Awards ==
Walter S. Brown received one battle star for her World War II service
