= USS Thomas J. Gary =

US naval vessel (1943–1973)

Coordinates: 37.2495407°N 9.8417601°E

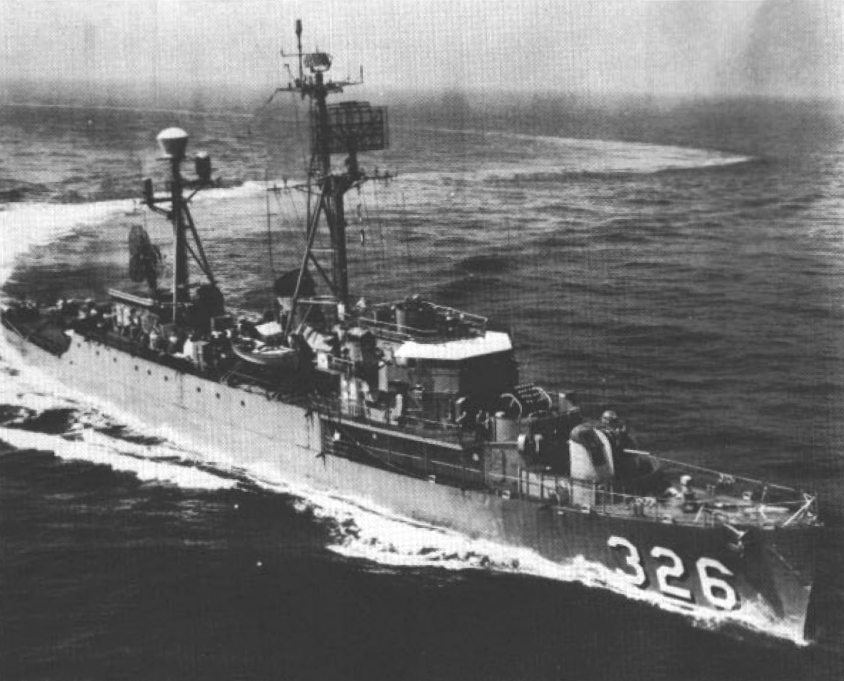
- USS Thomas J. Gary (DER-326) underway c1960

History

United States
- Name: Thomas J. Gary
- Namesake: Thomas J. Gary
- Builder: Consolidated Steel Corporation
- Laid down: As Gary (DE-326) 15 June 1943
- Launched: 21 August 1943
- Commissioned: 27 November 1943
- Decommissioned: 22 October 1973
- Stricken: 22 October 1973
- Fate: Transferred to Tunisia 22 October 1973

Tunisia
- Name: President Bourgiba
- Commissioned: 22 October 1973
- Fate: Fire on 16 April 1992, scrapped 1992-93

General characteristics
- Class & type: Edsall-class destroyer escort
- Displacement: 1,200 tons
- Length: 306 ft (93 m)
- Beam: 36 ft 7 in (11.15 m)
- Draft: 12 ft 3 in (3.73 m)
- Speed: 21.2 kn (39.3 km/h; 24.4 mph)
- Complement: 216
- Armament: 3 × 3 in (76 mm); 6 × 40 mm; 10 × 20 mm; 2 × depth charge tracks; 8 × K-gun depth charge projectors; 1 × depth charge projector (Hedgehog type)

USS Thomas J. Gary (DE-326) was an Edsall-class destroyer escort. The ship was renamed Thomas J. Gary on 1 January 1945 to free the name for planned light cruiser USS Gary (CL-147).

== Namesake ==
Thomas Jones Gary was born on 16 September 1922 in Texas City, Texas. He enlisted in the Navy on 30 September 1940. When the Japanese attacked Pearl Harbor on 7 December 1941, Seaman 2d Class Gary was on board the USS California. California suffered torpedo and bomb hits which caused extensive fires and flooding. After he had rescued three or four wounded men from closed and burning compartments in the ship, Seaman Gary continued his efforts to save others until he lost his own life. He was posthumously commended by the Secretary of the Navy for his courageous action and disregard for personal safety in assisting his endangered crewmates.

== Construction and commissioning ==
Gary (DE-326) was laid down on 15 June 1943 at Orange, Texas by the Consolidated Steel Corporation; launched on 21 August 1943; sponsored by Mrs. Wille Mae Gary, mother of Seaman 2nd Class Gary and commissioned on 27 November 1943.

== US Navy service history ==
Following shakedown exercises out of Bermuda and post-shakedown overhaul at Charleston, Gary reported to the Commander Caribbean Sea Frontier at Guantanamo Bay for temporary duty on 5 February 1944. She was detached from that command on 9 March and set her course for the Straits of Gibraltar, escorting the first of many transatlantic convoys. Until May 1945, Thomas J. Gary operated as an escort vessel in the Atlantic, safely screening eleven convoys from the East Coast to ports in the Mediterranean and the United Kingdom and back to the United States. Here is a list of the ETO convoys:

Casablanca Algiers (twice) Tunisia Naples Taranto, Italy Southampton (twice) Plymouth Portsmouth Liverpool

While on the east coast between patrols, Gary trained off the coast of Maine and out of Guantanamo Bay, Cuba, and conducted antisubmarine warfare exercises out of New London. During June 1944, she was assigned to the Navy Fleet Sound School.

In December 1944, she detached from the homebound convoy she was escorting from British ports to aid Huron which had collided with a merchantman. On the 9th, she took on board more than 100 Coast Guardsmen from the badly damaged patrol escort vessel and then screened her as she was towed to Bermuda.

=== Pacific Duty ===
While the ship was moored at Boston on 1 January 1945, her name was expanded to Thomas J. Gary. She completed her last Atlantic convoy upon her arrival at New York on 7 May and spent the remainder of the month preparing for service in the Pacific. Following refresher training in the Caribbean, she departed waters of the coast of Haiti on 22 June; steamed – via the Panama Canal – to the west coast; and departed San Diego on 12 July with the convoy bound for Hawaii. She arrived at Pearl Harbor on 20 July to begin repairs and training.

On 1 August, she departed Oahu with Escort Division 57 and steamed for Saipan. After a brief stop at Eniwetok, she was rerouted to Guam and arrived at Apra Harbor on the 13th. The same day, she again got underway; this time with Carrier Division 27. As the force steamed toward the Philippines, word of Japan's surrender reached the ship. Following her arrival at San Pedro Bay on 17 August, Thomas J. Gary remained in port until the 29th when she departed Leyte to screen the aircraft carriers of Task Group (TG) 77.1 during their passage to Korea.

=== Voyage to Japan ===
Bob Redmon says "Toward the end of the war we were part of a task force that was probably larger than the one on D-Day. This task force was commanded by Admiral Kincaid and we were underway for the first invasion of the Japanese mainland. Now get this, we were running escort for the battleship California on which Seaman Gary lost his life at Pearl Harbor. Still gives me goose bumps. We knew something was up. We had left Okinawa for the invasion.

Since we were only about 300 miles from the Japanese coast we had no idea why it was taking so long. Of course when we started dropping the big bombs we understood. I still would have liked for the big boys who were sunk at Pearl to have had a chance to lob those 16 inchers ashore and say "hey, Japs, look who's here." especially the California." (NOTE: USS California has 14-inch main guns, not 16 inchers. 16s were on the Colorado, North Carolina, South Dakota and Iowa Class battleships)

En route, the task group was diverted to Formosa. With Commander Escort Division 57 embarked, Thomas J. Gary was designated to liberate Allied prisoners of war (POW) who had been held on that island. On 3 September, she embarked 19 marines from Block Island charged with arranging the details of the evacuation of the POW's. Her division commander was also responsible for making the preliminary arrangements for the occupation of Formosa.

Before dawn of 5 September off the coast of Formosa, Thomas J. Gary and Kretchmer were detached from the escort carrier task group. The destroyer escorts were without navigational guides to indicate the location of mines in water surrounding the island. Despite the signing of the peace some days before, resistance from die-hard Japanese was a distinct possibility.

At 0718, as the two ships approached the waters most apt to be mined, every precaution was taken to minimize damage and casualties, should the ships strike a mine. The American sailors maintained a state of readiness to repel possible attack, as Thomas J. Gary, with her sister ship 500 yards astern, threaded her way at nine knots through the unknown and dangerous waters. Four Combat Air Patrol planes provided cover, and two anti-mine sweep planes from the carriers relayed word of the sightings of possible mines as the destroyer escorts picked their way through the hazardous approaches to Kiirun, making frequent changes of course to avoid sonar contacts which exhibited a suspicious similarity to those made by mines. One mile north of Kiirun Island, she rendezvoused with a small Japanese tug which led the way into Kiirun Harbor, where a Japanese harbor pilot pointed out the dock to be used.

The ships maintained a condition of modified general quarters and stationed armed guards on shore. A detail headed by Thomas J. Gary's communications officer took over the local Japanese radio station to insure reliable communications between the task group and Japanese authorities in Kiirun for the duration of the evacuation operation. Finally, at 1630, a train arrived bearing Allied prisoners of war who were quickly transferred to the waiting destroyer escorts.

At 1800, provided now with a Japanese pilot and Japanese charts of the minefields in the vicinity of Kiirun, Thomas J. Gary got underway. Her commanding officer later dryly reported: "Our outbound route did not coincide with the one used inbound since we discovered that our inbound track crossed several minefields." That night, she rendezvoused with the carriers and transferred the newly freed POW's to the larger ships.

On 6 September, Thomas J. Gary, joined by other destroyer escorts, returned to Kiirun to transport additional POW's. After transferring most other passengers to Block Island, she got underway for Manila; and, on 9 September, she arrived at Manila to discharge the last 50 of her POW's.

=== Duties in the Far East and Europe ===
Later in the month, Thomas J. Gary steamed on to the Ryukyu Islands with the escort carrier group: and she operated out of Okinawa into October, conducting exercises in the East China Sea. On 19 October, while at sea with the escort carrier group, she struck a submerged log, which caused considerable damage to her starboard propeller. Slowed to 13 knots (24 km/h; 15 mph), she was forced to leave the formation and put in at Saipan on 23 November for repairs.

She next operated in the Philippines into the new year with calls at Hong Kong and Okinawa. The destroyer escort departed Singapore on 8 April 1946 and set her course via the Suez Canal for the Mediterranean where she spent much of May visiting European ports. On 29 May, Thomas J. Gary arrived at Charleston to commence dry-docking and preservation procedures. On 25 September, tug Nancy Moran towed the destroyer escort from Charleston and headed for Green Cove Springs, Florida. She was decommissioned there on 7 March 1947 and placed in reserve.

=== DER-326 ===
On 24 July 1956, Thomas J. Gary was delivered to the Philadelphia Naval Shipyard for conversion to radar picket escort ship; and, on 1 November 1956, she was designated DER-326.

She was re-commissioned on 2 August 1957 and spent the remainder of the year in training exercises out of Newport, Rhode Island, and Guantanamo Bay, Cuba. On 30 December, she departed Newport and began duties on the Atlantic Barrier, a part of the North American Defense Command. Operating out of Newport, she completed 12 radar picket assignments in the 18 months, breaking the routine duty with a visit to Belgium and the United Kingdom in August 1958.

In July 1959, Thomas J. Gary entered Boston Navy Yard for an overhaul. She remained there until 30 October when she got underway for refresher training in waters off the coast of Cuba. On 20 December, she resumed her former duties in the Atlantic alternating North Atlantic Barrier and Contiguous Radar Coverage System assignments.

Early in 1961, she varied radar picket duties with participation in Operation "Springboard"; and, in May, she steamed off Bermuda participating in Operation "Lantbex". In August, she completed a DEW Line assignment in the northeast Atlantic with a visit to Scotland and finished out the year in overhaul at Boston.

Thomas J. Gary next set her course of Guantanamo Bay for refresher training; then, on 10 July 1962, she steamed from Newport for now familiar North Atlantic picket deployment. Between picket assignments, she put in at Greenock and at Wilhelmshaven for well-earned recreation for all hands. Shortly after her return to Newport on 22 October, she was called upon to conduct patrols in support of the Cuban Quarantine. Relieved of her patrol station off Key West on 29 November, she returned to Newport for availability and a welcome holiday in homeport.

She filled the opening months of 1963 with radar picket duty out of Key West as Southern Tip Picket, and two tours as Sonar School Ship at Key West. In April, a period of tender availability was cut short for Thomas J. Gary when she was called upon to take part in the unproductive search for the submarine Thresher lost off the Atlantic coast. She resumed Southern Tip Picket duties in July, and she returned to Newport late in August. On 24 September, she arrived at Boston for the overhaul and trials, which occupied the remainder of the year.

She opened 1964 with operations in the Caribbean including refresher training and participation in Operation "Springboard". She spent March undergoing availability at Newport and, during April and May, patrolled on picket station off Florida, with time out in May for a good will visit to Fall River, Massachusetts, on Armed Forces Day. She continued picket duties for the rest of the year breaking her routine with gunnery exercises off the Virginia Capes and a visit to the Naval Academy in October.

=== Trip to New Zealand, and Return to the Mediterranean ===
After participating in the annual exercise Operation "Springboard" again in 1965, she resumed picket duties and, on 30 June, phased out the Southern Tip Picket Station where she had spent so much of her post-World War II career. On 13 September, she departed Newport for a nine-month deployment in the Pacific which took her through the Panama Canal later that month and included support for Operation "Deep Freeze," a scientific expedition to the Antarctic. In March 1966, she departed New Zealand and steamed, via the Suez Canal, to the Mediterranean. Her ports of call in there and in the eastern Atlantic included Barcelona, Bremen, Copenhagen, and Edinburgh. She returned to Newport on 21 May 1966.

Thomas J. Gary again got underway from Newport on 24 August and set her course, via the Panama Canal and Pago Pago to Dunedin, New Zealand, her replenishment port during her participation in Operation ""Deep Freeze". Manning her station midway between McMurdo Sound and New Zealand, Thomas J. Gary acted as logistics headquarters for Operation "Deepfreeze" and stood ready to provide search and rescue for downed fliers. She remained in southern waters through the end of 1966.

In March, she called at Perth, Australia; then she set her course on 23 March for the Suez Canal. She called at European ports and returned to Newport on 24 May. On 1 July, her home port was officially changed to Key West. After her arrival there on 9 July, she helped to test experimental equipment during Operation "Combat Keel" late in the year. On 12 December, she returned to Key West for a period of upkeep.

In 1968, she operated out of Key West; conducted refresher training out of Guantanamo Bay; and, in August, participated in support operation for the practice firing of Polaris missiles by nuclear submarine Daniel Webster. Later in the year, she conducted special operations in the Bahamas and acted as school ship for the Fleet Sonar School at Key West.

She continued operations in the Caribbean Sea and off Florida into 1969. During that period her duties included patrolling off of Cuba's south coast, as an intelligence gathering ship, monitoring the Russian presence there. In July, she began a special four-month deployment during which she conducted intelligence support activities for antisubmarine forces in the Atlantic and earned a Navy Unit Commendation. She visited the Canary Islands and Malta before returning to Key West late in October.

After participating in Operation "Springboard" off Puerto Rico early in 1970, she got underway on 1 April and steamed across the Atlantic for operations which took her to Spain, Denmark, Germany, and the British Isles. On this deployment, she helped to develop new techniques and tactics in antisubmarine warfare in such an exemplary manner that she was awarded another Navy Unit Commendation. She returned to Key West on 7 September and operated out of that port into 1972 providing surveillance in support of the Atlantic Fleet. Departing Key West on 14 January 1972, she visited Wilhelmshaven; then returned via Senegal to the United States. Back in Key West in March, she resumed local operations out of that port which she continued well into 1973.

== Transfer to Tunisia ==
In September 1973, she began preparations for transfer to the Tunisian government. That month, 33 members of a Tunisian turnover team came on board for training. On 12 October, she got underway from Charleston and crossed the Atlantic, stopping briefly at Ponta Delgada and Palma de Mallorca before arriving at Bizerte on 21 October. The next day, Thomas J. Gary was decommissioned in ceremonies at the Quai d'Honneur, Bizerte; and moments later, the ship was commissioned by the Tunisian Navy as the President Bourgiba. Her name was struck from the Navy list that same day.

She suffered a major fire on 16 April 1992 and was subsequently scrapped. Her mast is preserved at Bizerte.
