= USS Crouter =

Evarts-class destroyer escort

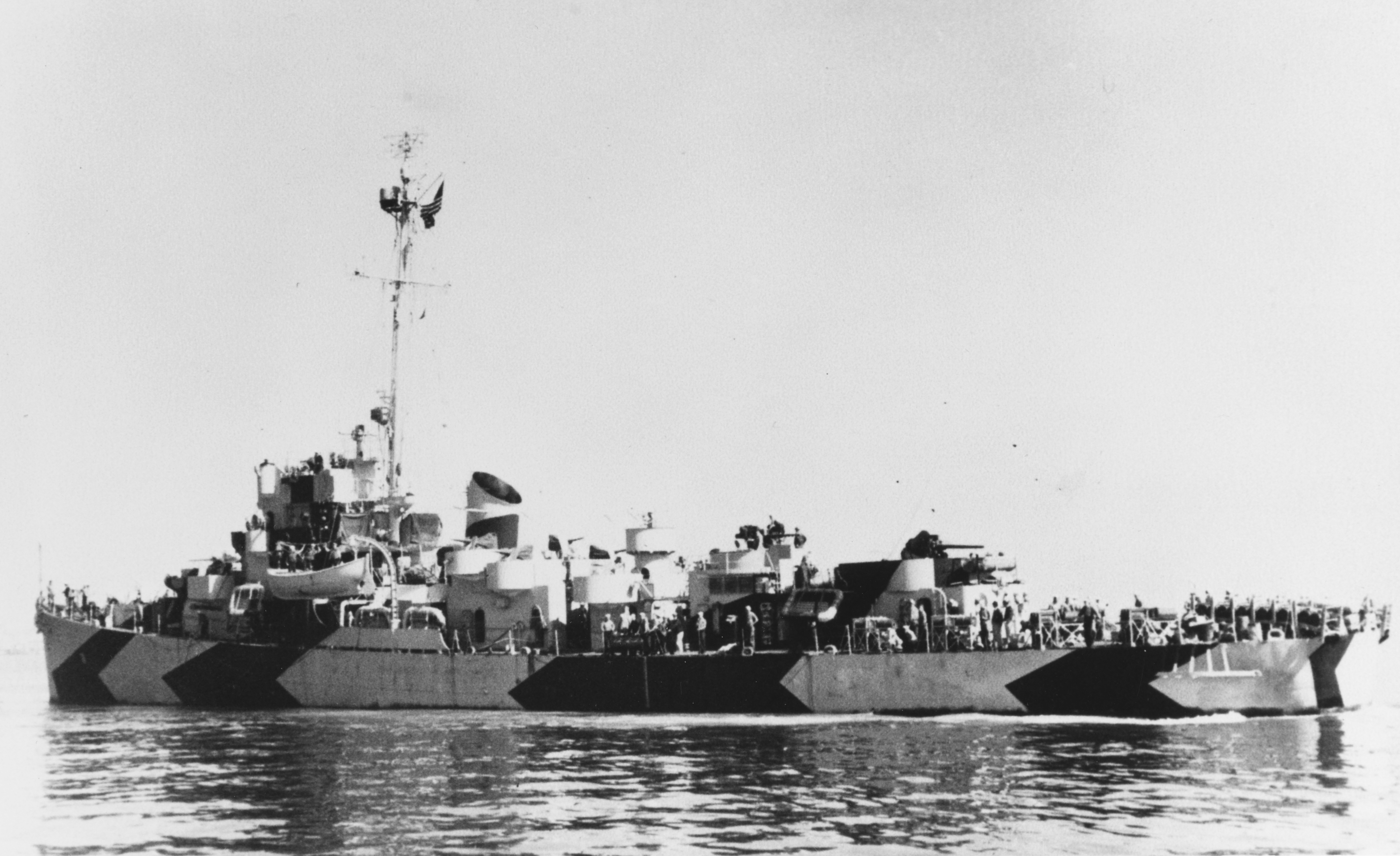
- Crouter underway on 24 May 1944

History

United States
- Name: USS Crouter
- Namesake: Mark Hanna Crouter
- Builder: Boston Navy Yard, Boston, Massachusetts
- Laid down: 8 February 1942
- Launched: 26 January 1943
- Sponsored by: Mrs. M. H. Crouter
- Commissioned: 25 May 1943
- Decommissioned: 30 November 1945
- Stricken: 19 December 1945
- Honors and awards: 1 battle star (World War II)
- Fate: Sold for scrapping, 25 November 1946; Broken up, 1947

General characteristics
- Type: Evarts-class destroyer escort
- Displacement: 1,430 long tons (1,453 t) full
- Length: 289 ft (88 m) o/a
- Speed: 19 knots (35 km/h; 22 mph)
- Complement: 15 officers and 183 enlisted
- Armament: 3 × 3"/50 Mk.22 guns; 1 × quad 1.1"/75 Mk.2 AA gun; 9 × 20 mm Mk.4 AA guns; 1 × Hedgehog Projector Mk.10 (144 rounds); 8 × Mk.6 depth charge projectors; 2 × Mk.9 depth charge tracks

USS Crouter (DE-11) was an Evarts-class destroyer escort of the United States Navy in commission from 1943 to 1945. The ship was named after Mark Hanna Crouter (1897–1942), U.S. Navy officer and Navy Cross recipient.

== Design ==
The Evarts-class destroyer escorts were 289 ft 5 in (88.21 m) long overall, and they had a beam of 35 ft 2 in (10.72 m). They had an average draft of 10 ft 1 in (3.07 m) at their full load displacement of 1,416 long tons (1,439 t). Each ship had a normal crew numbered 156 officers and sailors.

Crouter was propelled by a pair of diesel motors manufactured by General Motors, which drove a pair of screw propellers. Her propulsion system was rated to produce 6,000 brake horsepower (4,500 kW) for a top speed of 19.5 knots (36.1 km/h; 22.4 mph). Oil storage amounted to between 131 and 197 long tons (133 and 200 t), which allowed a cruising radius of up to 6,000 nautical miles (11,000 km; 6,900 mi) at an economical pace of 10 knots (19 km/h; 12 mph).

The ship's armament consisted of a main battery of three 3-inch (76 mm) /50-caliber guns in individual pivot mounts, which could be used against air or surface targets. These were supported by a light anti-aircraft battery that initially consisted of four 1.1 in (28 mm) /75-caliber guns in a quadruple mount and nine 20 mm (0.79 in) Oerlikon guns. For attacks against submarines, the ship was equipped with a Hedgehog mortar, eight depth charge throwers, and two depth charge racks.

== Service history ==
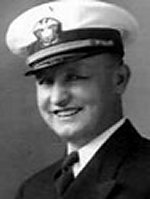
Commander Mark Hanna Crouter

Crouter originally was intended for transfer to the United Kingdom as BDE-11, but was instead retained by the U.S. Navy. She was then renamed Crouter after Mark Crouter, a naval officer killed aboard the heavy cruiser USS San Francisco during the Naval Battle of Guadalcanal. The ship was laid down on 8 February 1942 at the Boston Navy Yard at Boston, Massachusetts and launched on 26 January 1943, sponsored by Crouter's widow. The ship was commissioned on 25 May 1943.

Departing Boston on 24 July 1943, Crouter deployed to the Pacific Ocean for World War II service. She reached Nouméa, New Caledonia, on 3 September 1943. After several convoy escort voyages to Efate and Espiritu Santo in the New Hebrides and to Viti Levu in the Fiji Islands, she escorted convoys between Nouméa and Port Purvis on Florida Island in the Solomons, aiding in the consolidation of the Solomon Islands until 31 March 1944. After overhaul on the United States West Coast, Crouter escorted a convoy from Pearl Harbor, Hawaii, to Eniwetok between 14 June 1944 and 3 July 1944. Returning to Pearl Harbor, Crouter conducted submarine training exercises, and rescued nine survivors of a crashed PBY Catalina flying boat on 15 July 1944. She departed Pearl Harbor on 3 August 1944 for continued operations with submarines from Majuro between 13 August and 24 October 1944. Arriving at Eniwetok on 26 October 1944, Crouter operated out of that port as convoy escort to Ulithi Atoll, Kossol Roads, and Saipan until 15 March 1945.

At San Pedro Bay, Leyte, in the Philippine Islands, Crouter joined the screen of the transport convoy bound for Okinawa, arriving on 1 April 1945 for the invasion landings. She remained on patrol off Okinawa, joining a hunter-killer group from 19 April 1945 to 28 April 1945. Her service in anti-aircraft work included shooting down two suicide planes.

Crouter reported to Guam on 21 May 1945 for training with submarines, remaining there through the end of the war and until 18 September 1945.

Crouter returned to the United States at San Pedro, California, on 5 October 1945, and was decommissioned on 30 November 1945. She was sold for scrapping on 25 November 1946.

== Awards ==
Crouter was awarded one battle star for World War II service in the Pacific.

- Combat Action Ribbon (retroactive)
- American Campaign Medal
- Asiatic-Pacific Campaign Medal (with one service star)
- World War II Victory Medal
