= USS Neuendorf =

Buckley-class destroyer escort

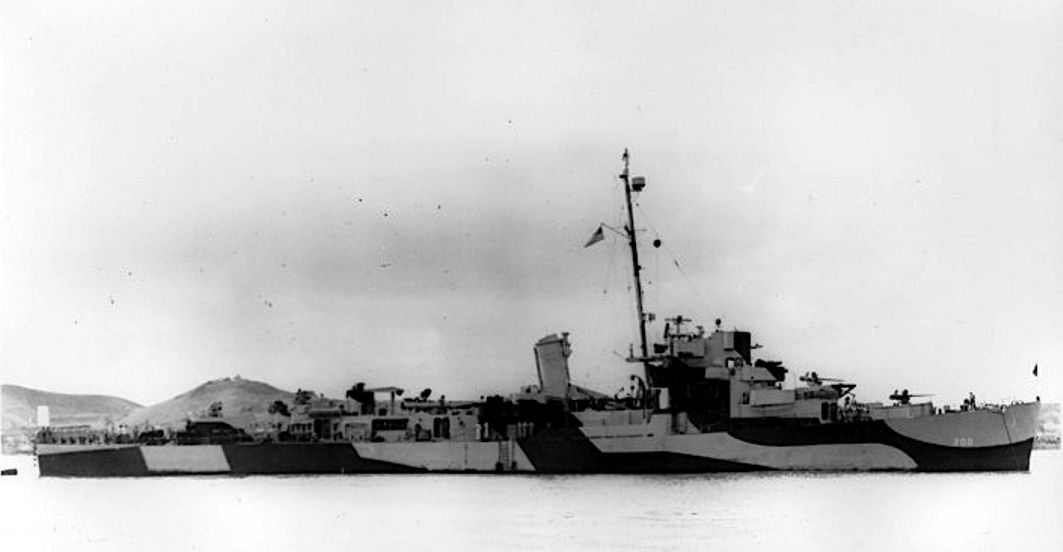

History

United States
- Name: USS Neuendorf
- Namesake: William Frederick Neuendorf
- Ordered: 1942
- Builder: Charleston Navy Yard
- Laid down: 15 February 1943
- Launched: 1 June 1943
- Commissioned: 18 October 1943
- Decommissioned: 14 May 1946
- Stricken: 1 July 1967
- Honors and awards: 3 battle stars (World War II)
- Fate: Sunk as target, 30 November 1967

General characteristics
- Class & type: Buckley-class destroyer escort
- Displacement: 1,400 long tons (1,422 t) light; 1,740 long tons (1,768 t) standard
- Length: 306 ft (93 m)
- Beam: 37 ft (11 m)
- Draft: 9 ft 6 in (2.90 m) standard; 11 ft 3 in (3.43 m) full load
- Propulsion: 2 × boilers; General Electric turbo-electric drive; 12,000 shp (8.9 MW); 2 × solid manganese-bronze 3,600 lb (1,600 kg) 3-bladed propellers, 8 ft 6 in (2.59 m) diameter, 7 ft 7 in (2.31 m) pitch; 2 × rudders; 359 tons fuel oil
- Speed: 23 knots (43 km/h; 26 mph)
- Range: 3,700 nmi (6,900 km) at 15 kn (28 km/h; 17 mph); 6,000 nmi (11,000 km) at 12 kn (22 km/h; 14 mph)
- Complement: 15 officers, 198 men
- Armament: 3 × 3-inch/50-caliber guns; 1 × quad 1.1-inch/75-caliber gun; 8 × single 20 mm guns; 1 × triple 21 inch (533 mm) torpedo tubes; 1 × Hedgehog anti-submarine mortar; 8 × K-gun depth charge projectors; 2 × depth charge tracks

USS Neuendorf (DE-200) was a Buckley-class destroyer escort in service with the United States Navy from 1943 to 1946. She was sunk as a target in 1967.

== History ==
=== Namesake ===
USS Neuendorf was named in honour of Seaman First Class William Frederick Neuendorf (1916–1941), who was killed in action aboard the battleship USS Nevada, as gun captain of No. 6 A.A. gun, gave an example of leadership, skill, and bravery that is remarked upon by all who observed it during the Japanese attack on Pearl Harbor on 7 December 1941. He was commended posthumously "for distinguished devotion to duty and extraordinary courage and disregard for his own safety[,]" and was the most junior sailor mentioned specifically for distinguished conduct in the after action report of USS Nevada regarding the attack on Pearl Harbor.

=== Pacific War ===
Neuendorf was laid down at the Charleston Navy Yard on 15 February 1943. The ship was launched on 1 June 1943, sponsored by Mrs. Edna Rose Morton, the sister of W. F. Neuendorf, Jr., SN1. The destroyer escort was commissioned on 18 October 1943.

Following shakedown off Bermuda and availability at the Charleston Navy Yard, Neuendorf, a unit of CortDiv 37, proceeded to New Orleans where she joined troop transports en route to Panama. Transiting the Canal, the destroyer escort headed west, arriving at Nouméa on 28 January 1944. Through March she escorted supply and transport vessels in the Solomons and the New Hebrides and guarded fleet oilers as they rendezvoused with ships operating against Truk and the Palaus.

Next assigned to the 7th Fleet, she reported for duty at Milne Bay, New Guinea, on 7 April. From there, she completed an escort run to Lae and then shepherded resupply echelons to the newly seized beaches at Hollandia, Aitape, and Tanahmerah Bay. By 18 May, she stood off Wakde Island with an LST echelon which unloaded quickly and sailed for Hollandia the same day. Escort assignments to Aitape, Hollandia and Wakde followed until June when Saidor, Manus and Biak were added to her destinations. Between 25 June and 7 July, she conducted ASW patrol off the latter, then off Aitape and at the end of the month resumed escort work.

In mid-August, she returned to Purvis Bay to resume escort work in the Solomons until 13 October when she sailed for Manus and another tour with the 7th Fleet. After escorting an ammunition supply group to Kossol Roads and an oiler group to Hollandia, she bombarded enemy shore installations in the Maffin Bay area and then departed Wakde to guard an LST echelon to Leyte, arriving on 15 November. Getting under way for Hollandia again the same day, she underwent intensive training in preparation for the upcoming Luzon offensive.

On 2 January 1945, she headed for the Philippines with a small oiler group. Rendezvousing with the Lingayen Minesweeping Group, the force headed through Surigao Strait and into Leyte Gulf. Enemy aircraft plagued the force as it steamed north toward Mindoro where the oilers anchored in Mangarin Bay under the protective watch of Neuendorf and sister ship Manning (DE-199). Between 5 January and 21 February, Neuendorf conducted ASW and HUK patrols, served radar picket duty, and escorted the tankers on refueling missions.

On the 22nd, the destroyer escort returned to Leyte for tender availability, after which she resumed escort work between New Guinea and the Philippines. On 15 April, she was designated flagship for Commander, Local Naval Defense Forces, Iloilo, Panay. There for the next four months, she returned to Leyte after the cessation of hostilities, made an escort run to Okinawa and on 1 October departed the Philippines and headed home.

=== Decommissioning and fate ===
Arriving at San Diego on 23 October, Neuendorf underwent inactivation overhaul and on 14 May 1946 decommissioned and entered the Pacific Reserve Fleet. She remained a unit of that fleet until authorized for use as a target and struck from the Navy List on 1 July 1967. She was sunk on 30 November 1967.

== Awards ==
Neuendorf earned three battle stars during World War II. Combat Action Ribbon, American Campaign Medal, Asiatic-Pacific Campaign Medal w/ 3 stars, World War II Victory Medal, Philippine Liberation Ribbon
