= USS Rall =

Evarts-class destroyer escord of the United States Navy during World War II

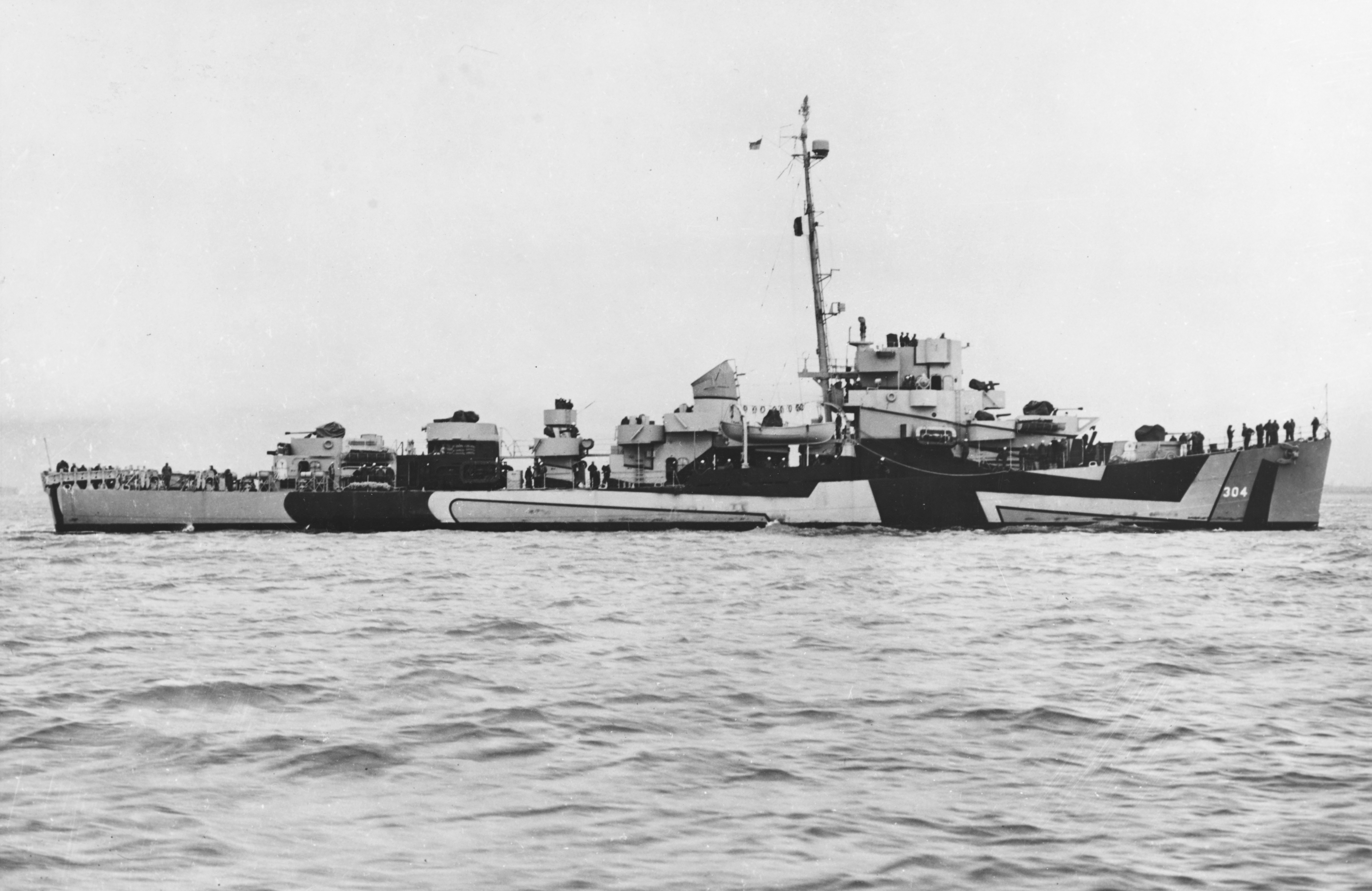
- Rall underway on 23 April 1944

History

United States
- Name: USS Rall
- Builder: Mare Island Navy Yard
- Laid down: 24 May 1943
- Launched: 23 September 1943
- Commissioned: 8 April 1944
- Decommissioned: 11 December 1945
- Stricken: 3 January 1946
- Honors and awards: 3 battle stars (World War II)
- Fate: Sold for scrapping, 18 March 1947

General characteristics
- Type: Evarts-class destroyer escort
- Displacement: 1,140 long tons (1,158 t) standard; 1,430 long tons (1,453 t) full
- Length: 289 ft 5 in (88.21 m) o/a; 283 ft 6 in (86.41 m) w/l
- Beam: 35 ft 2 in (10.72 m)
- Draft: 11 ft (3.4 m) (max)
- Propulsion: 4 × General Motors Model 16-278A diesel engines with electric drive, 6,000 shp (4,474 kW); 2 screws
- Speed: 19 knots (35 km/h; 22 mph)
- Range: 4,150 nmi (7,690 km)
- Complement: 15 officers and 183 enlisted
- Armament: 3 × single 3"/50 Mk.22 dual purpose guns; 1 × quad 1.1"/75 Mk.2 AA gun; 9 × 20 mm Mk.4 AA guns; 1 × Hedgehog Projector Mk.10 (144 rounds); 8 × Mk.6 depth charge projectors; 2 × Mk.9 depth charge tracks

USS Rall (DE-304) was an Evarts-class destroyer escort of the United States Navy during World War II. She was sent off into the Pacific Ocean to protect convoys and other ships from Japanese submarines and fighter aircraft. She performed escort and anti-submarine operations in dangerous battle areas and returned home with three battle stars.

== Design ==
The Evarts-class destroyer escorts were 289 ft 5 in (88.21 m) long overall, and they had a beam of 35 ft 2 in (10.72 m). They had an average draft of 10 ft 1 in (3.07 m) at their full load displacement of 1,416 long tons (1,439 t). Each ship had a normal crew numbered 156 officers and sailors.

Rall was propelled by a pair of diesel motors manufactured by General Motors, which drove a pair of screw propellers. Her propulsion system was rated to produce 6,000 brake horsepower (4,500 kW) for a top speed of 19.5 knots (36.1 km/h; 22.4 mph). Oil storage amounted to between 131 and 197 long tons (133 and 200 t), which allowed a cruising radius of up to 6,000 nautical miles (11,000 km; 6,900 mi) at an economical pace of 10 knots (19 km/h; 12 mph).

The ship's armament consisted of a main battery of three 3-inch (76 mm) /50-caliber guns in individual pivot mounts, which could be used against air or surface targets. These were supported by a light anti-aircraft battery that initially consisted of four 1.1 in (28 mm) /75-caliber guns in a quadruple mount and nine 20 mm (0.79 in) Oerlikon guns. For attacks against submarines, the ship was equipped with a Hedgehog mortar, eight depth charge throwers, and two depth charge racks.

== Service history ==
She was laid down on 24 May 1943; launched on 23 September by Mare Island Naval Shipyard, Vallejo, California; sponsored by Mrs. R. R. Rall, widow of Lieutenant (junior grade) Rall; and commissioned on 8 April 1944. Following shakedown and training exercises off the California coast in April and May, Rall departed San Francisco, California, on 9 June, escorting USS City of Dalhart (IX-156), and arrived at Pearl Harbor on 18 June. For the next three months, she supported the Pacific Submarine Training Command.

On 23 September 1944, the destroyer escort sortied from Pearl Harbor to escort troop ships carrying the occupation force for Ulithi Atoll. The task group arrived at Ulithi on 8 October and spent the remainder of the month on patrol and escort missions there and in the Palaus. In the early weeks of November, the destroyers served in an escort group protecting the oilers of Task Group 30.8, which supported the assault ships at the Leyte Gulf landings. During this duty she rode out heavy weather from a typhoon with no serious damage. On 20 November a Japanese midget submarine torpedoed and sank oiler Mississinewa (AO-59) in Ulithi Lagoon. Laying depth charge patterns at the site of swirls in the calm water of the lagoon, Rall was credited with sinking the submarine when debris and bodies surfaced.

Following patrol duties in early December, Rall and Halloran (DE-305) escorted two escort carriers to the Admiralty Islands, then returned to Ulithi. On 14 December Rall with other ships sortied from that atoll and arrived in Hawaii in time for Christmas. After invasion rehearsals at Maui and Kahoolawe preparatory to the Iwo Jima assault, Rall got underway 26 February 1945 as a unit of the escort group convoying the garrison troops for the occupation of that island. The transports and their escorts arrived on 21 March and landed the Army occupation units. Rall then escorted the transport group carrying assault troops back to Saipan. From there she proceeded to Espiritu Santo, New Hebrides, arriving on 19 March.

Assigned as a screening ship for the transports carrying the Floating Reserve, the 27th Infantry Division, for the Okinawa invasion, DE-304 sortied from Espiritu Santo on 25 March for Ulithi and the Ryukyus. En route, the convoy made an unidentified submarine contact, and Rall's lookout spotted a floating mine in the convoy path and detonated it by gunfire. The task group arrived off Okinawa on 9 April, and Rall took a screening station about 10 miles southeast of Ie Shima. The next few days were quiet except for air raid alerts.

At 1925 on 12 April 1945, the ship went to General Quarters. During the next three hours, 14 separate air attacks were tracked into the area, as the "Divine Wind" brought death and damage to the American invasion fleet off Okinawa. A raid of five Japanese planes approached Rall's sector. The destroyer escort's gunners commenced firing, splashing three of the kamikazes. A fourth was destroyed by a cruiser, but the fifth broke through the fiery screen, and the plane, damaged and aflame hit the escort on the starboard side aft. A 500-pound bomb slung beneath the plane tore through the ship, exploding in the air about 15 feet from the port side. The explosion and fire from the suicide plane, combined with strafing attacks from another wave of fighters, resulted in heavy damage, 21 dead and 38 wounded. Prompt damage control action extinguished the fires and temporary repairs were commenced. Rall entered the Hagushi Beach anchorage and moored alongside Pinkney (APH-2), where most of the wounded were transferred. The dead were removed the next morning for burial on Okinawa.

After initial repairs, ComCortDiv 61 shifted his pennant to Finnegan (DE-307), and the Rall departed for the Kerama Retto anchorage on 15 April. She was ordered on to Ulithi, arriving there on 23 April. Following additional structural repairs, she left Ulithi for the last time and arrived at Seattle, Washington, on 18 May. Following repairs and overhaul, the ship headed for San Diego, California, on 12 July. Upon completion of underway refresher training, Rall left San Diego on 28 July, arriving Pearl Harbor on 5 August. Training occupied the time until 3 September, when Rall sailed for the east coast proceeding via San Pedro, Los Angeles, and the Panama Canal. Arriving Charleston Navy Yard on 24 September, she was decommissioned on 11 December 1945, and struck from the Naval Vessel Register on 3 January 1946. Her hulk was sold for scrap on 18 March 1947.

== Awards ==
Rall earned three battle stars for World War II service.
