= USS Kretchmer =

1943 Edsall-class destroyer escort

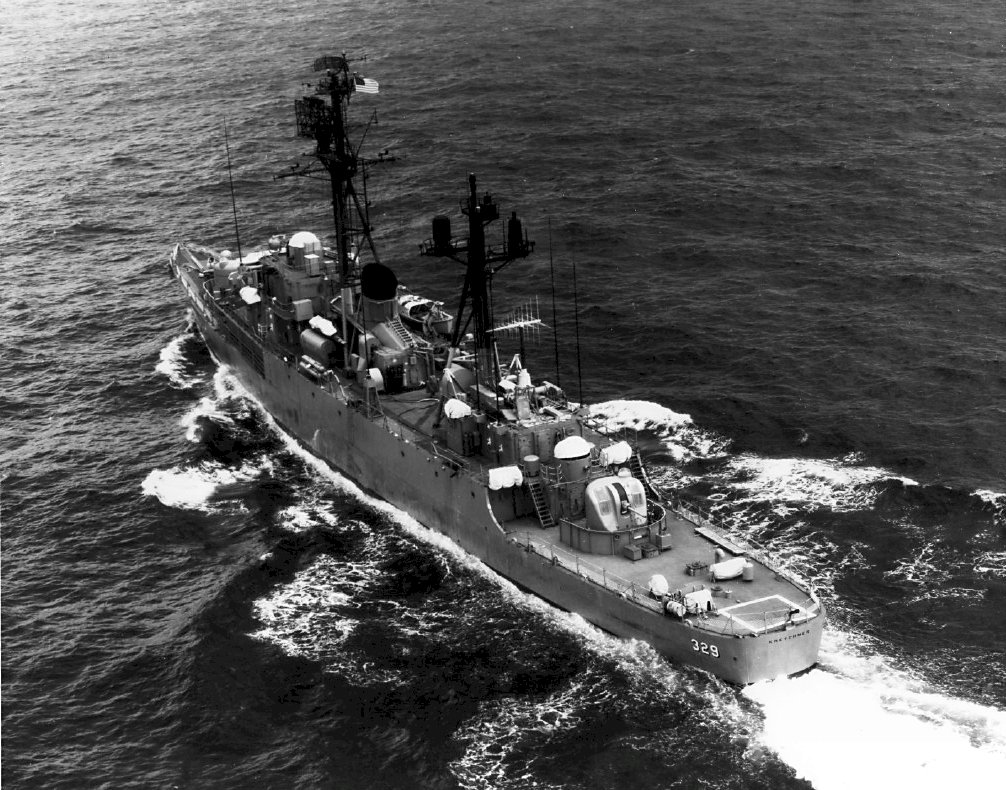

History

United States
- Builder: Consolidated Steel Corporation, Orange, Texas
- Laid down: 28 June 1943
- Launched: 31 August 1943
- Commissioned: 13 December 1943
- Decommissioned: 1 October 1973
- Reclassified: DER-329, 21 October 1955
- Stricken: 30 September 1973
- Fate: Sold for scrapping 14 May 1974

General characteristics
- Class & type: Edsall-class destroyer escort
- Displacement: 1,253 tons standard; 1,590 tons full load
- Length: 306 feet (93.27 m)
- Beam: 36.58 feet (11.15 m)
- Draft: 10.42 full load feet (3.18 m)
- Propulsion: 4 FM diesel engines, 4 diesel-generators, 6,000 shp (4.5 MW), 2 screws
- Speed: 21 knots (39 km/h)
- Range: 9,100 nmi. at 12 knots; (17,000 km at 22 km/h)
- Complement: 8 officers, 201 enlisted
- Armament: 3 × single 3 in (76 mm)/50 guns; 1 × twin 40 mm AA guns; 8 × single 20 mm AA guns; 1 × triple 21 in (533 mm) torpedo tubes; 8 × depth charge projectors; 1 × depth charge projector (hedgehog); 2 × depth charge tracks

USS Kretchmer (DE-329) was an Edsall-class destroyer escort built for the U.S. Navy during World War II. She served in the Atlantic Ocean and the Pacific Ocean and provided destroyer escort protection against submarine and air attack for Navy vessels and convoys.

== Namesake ==
Raymond Joseph Kretchmer was born on 30 January 1917, in Chicago, Illinois. He enlisted in the U.S. Naval Reserve on 29 August 1940. He was appointed Midshipman, Naval Reserve, at Northwestern University and commissioned Ensign on 12 September 1941. He was assigned to active duty on 12 September and served on board USS Astoria. He was killed in action 9 August 1942 when Astoria was sunk by Imperial Japanese Navy forces during the Battle of Savo Island.

== Construction and commissioning ==
Kretchmer was laid down 28 June 1943, by Consolidated Steel Corporation, Orange, Texas; launched 31 August 1943; sponsored by Miss Betty Kretchmer, sister of Ensign Kretchmer; and commissioned 13 December 1943.

== World War II North Atlantic operations ==
After a Bermuda shakedown Kretchmer departed Charleston, South Carolina, 15 February 1944, for operations in the Caribbean. Based at Port-of-Spain, Trinidad, she escorted convoys to Cuba and Bermuda until sailing for Key West, Florida, 2 May. Assigned to an air wing training detachment, Kretchmer operated with torpedo bombers for 3 weeks, before departing Charleston 8 June escorting a convoy to Europe. Sailing via Curaçao, D.W.I., Kretchmer screened shipping bound for Naples, Italy, in preparation for the assaults on southern France. After returning to the United States 16 July, the escort ship made one more cruise to Naples during the summer.

== Transfer to the Pacific Fleet ==
Between 20 September 1944 and 27 April 1945, Kretchmer sailed as escort to five convoys from New York to United Kingdom ports. After victory in Europe, she prepared for Pacific Fleet duty arriving Pearl Harbor 5 July. Clearing Pearl Harbor 1 August, Kretchmer was en route to the Philippines when hostilities stopped on 14 August.

Serving in the Far East until 1 April 1946, the destroyer escort engaged in occupation and repatriation operations, including the evacuation of Allied prisoners of war from Formosa during September 1945. Kretchmer also served on escort duty, mine patrol, and mail runs between Chinese ports. Departing Hong Kong 1 April 1946, she returned home by way of the Indian Ocean and Mediterranean, arriving Charleston, South Carolina, 29 May. Kretchmer decommissioned at Green Cove Springs, Florida, 20 September 1946.

== Conversion to picket ship ==
After extensive conversion, Kretchmer recommissioned as DER-329 on 22 September 1956. After shakedown in the Caribbean, the radar picket arrived at Boston, Massachusetts, 18 December to commence operations in the Northern Radar Barrier. Based at Newport, Rhode Island, from 1957 to 1962, she remained on picket duty, making regular patrols to provide early warning to the continental air defense systems. Kretchmer also made cruises to northern Europe in 1958, 1961, and 1962, and in August 1961 rescued six men from foundered Icelandic fishing vessel MV Sleipnir.

== Cuban Missile Crisis activity ==
In the aftermath of the Cuban Missile Crisis, Kretchmer departed Newport 23 November 1962 for picket duty off the southern coast of the United States. While operating as plane guard and screen for USS Essex (CV-9) in Key West, Florida, waters, Kretchmer rescued two shrimp fishermen from disabled fishing vessel MV Ala, after they had been fired upon by Cuban MiG aircraft. On 21 February 1963, while Kretchmer was guarding Ala, a MiG-17 made four passes at the disabled fishing craft before turning tail ahead of U.S. Marine aircraft.

Kretchmer continued picket and training operations in the Atlantic until 21 May 1965, when she entered Boston Naval Shipyard for overhaul prior to deployment in the western Pacific. The ship departed Newport, Rhode Island, for Guam, arriving in Agana, Guam, Mariana Islands on 2 August 1965 after a stopover at Pearl Harbor.

== Vietnam Operations ==
One month later, Kretchmer joined other vessels off the South Vietnam coast in Operation Market Time, keeping coastal traffic under surveillance to prevent the shipment of Communist arms and supply to South Vietnam by sea. Her motor whaleboat came under heavy small arms fire during a roundup operation in November 1965. No American casualties resulted and Kretchmer's search party seized a large number of suspected guerrilla infiltrators.

By the end of a year of patrol, the ship had investigated some 17,000 contacts, and boarded over 1,000 small craft. On 10 December 1965 Kretchmer steamed into Apra Harbor, Guam, where she remained until her departure 22 February 1966 for a 7-month deployment with the 7th Fleet. She continued "Market Time" patrol off the coast and in the harbors of Vietnam working closely with other US Navy and Coast Guard vessels assigned to Task Force 115, searching junks and providing gunfire support for US Marine and US Army operations ashore. She left Subic Bay 29 September 1966 for her homeport, Guam, where she remained in Restricted Availability and leave until 9 January 1967, departing the Guam homeport once again for a nine-month deployment with the 7th Fleet. Kretchmer served Task Force 115 in all nine of South Vietnam's Market Time Zones through 1967, 1968 and briefly in 1969. Notably, on 10 June 1967, Kretchmer and three PCFs rounded up 120 Viet Cong and 60 junks when Republic of Korea Army troops pushed the enemy to shore at Quang Gnai. POWs were held aboard until US Navy small craft transferred the captives. Her continued presence on the South China Sea and Gulf of Siam coasts delineated the commitment of the United States to the preservation of the independence of South Vietnam.

== Taiwan Patrol & Hong Kong Station Ship Operations ==
When Kretchmer was not engaged in Vietnam Market Time Operations or Restricted Availability in homeport Agana, Guam, during her 1965-1969 Western Pacific 7th Fleet deployment, she usually patrolled the Taiwan Straits between Communist China and Taiwan or was assigned to Station Ship Hong Kong, B.C.C. as SOPA (Senior Officer Present Administration). Kretchmer visited Bangkok, Thailand for R&R (rest and recuperation between combat zone patrols), Subic Bay, Philippines for R&R, dry dock and repairs, Yokosuka, Japan for R&R, operational training and certification, Keelung and Kaohsiung, Taiwan for R&R, repairs and resupply between patrols of the Taiwan Straits. Notably, in the latter half of 1969, while on Taiwan Patrol she was caught in winds topping 70 knots and high seas while in the Straits.

== Key West ==
In early 1970, after a brief homeport assignment in Pearl Harbor, Hawaii, Kretchmer transferred to the Atlantic Fleet via the Panama Canal, stopping in San Francisco and Acapulco along the way. Her new homeport was Key West with DesDiv 601 and was an ASW training ship. During this time, she fired off hedgehogs as a weapons evaluation and later was to drop depth charges between two submarines at periscope depth for the submarine CO/XO school.

== Fate ==
She was decommissioned in Key West, Florida on 1 October 1973 and stricken 30 September 1973. She was sold for scrapping 14 May 1974.
