= USS Manning (DE-199) =

Buckley-class destroyer escort

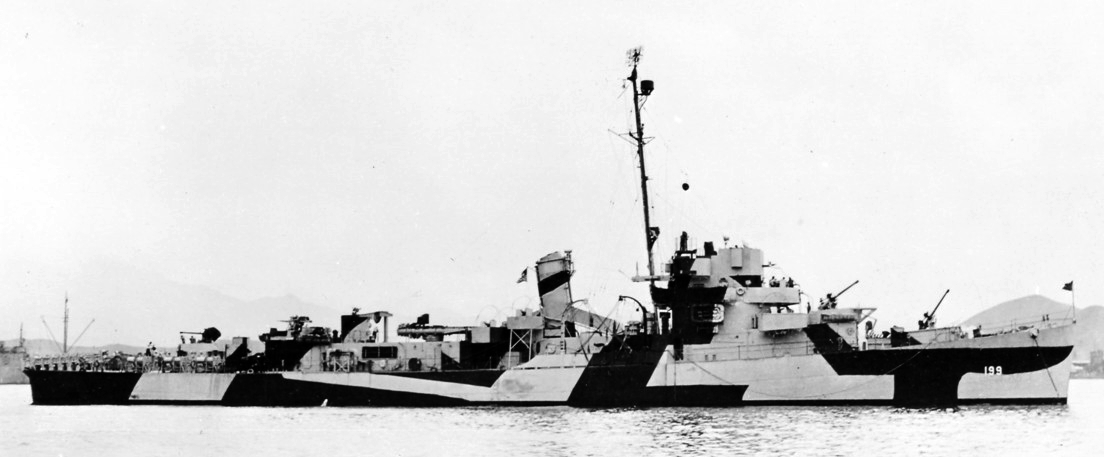

History

United States
- Name: USS Manning
- Ordered: 1942
- Builder: Charleston Navy Yard
- Laid down: 15 February 1943
- Launched: 1 June 1943
- Commissioned: 1 October 1943
- Decommissioned: 15 January 1947
- Stricken: 31 July 1968
- Honors and awards: 4 battle stars (World War II)
- Fate: Sold for scrap, 27 October 1969

General characteristics
- Class & type: Buckley-class destroyer escort
- Displacement: 1,400 long tons (1,422 t) standard; 1,740 long tons (1,768 t) full load
- Length: 306 ft (93 m)
- Beam: 37 ft (11 m)
- Draft: 9 ft 6 in (2.90 m) standard; 11 ft 3 in (3.43 m) full load
- Propulsion: 2 × boilers; General Electric turbo-electric drive; 12,000 shp (8.9 MW); 2 × solid manganese-bronze 3,600 lb (1,600 kg) 3-bladed propellers, 8 ft 6 in (2.59 m) diameter, 7 ft 7 in (2.31 m) pitch; 2 × rudders; 359 tons fuel oil
- Speed: 23 knots (43 km/h; 26 mph)
- Range: 3,700 nmi (6,900 km) at 15 kn (28 km/h; 17 mph); 6,000 nmi (11,000 km) at 12 kn (22 km/h; 14 mph)
- Complement: 15 officers, 198 men
- Armament: 3 × 3-inch/50-caliber guns; 1 × quad 1.1-inch/75-caliber gun; 8 × single 20 mm guns; 1 × triple 21 inch (533 mm) torpedo tubes; 1 × Hedgehog anti-submarine mortar; 8 × K-gun depth charge projectors; 2 × depth charge tracks

USS Manning (DE-199) was a Buckley-class destroyer escort in service with the United States Navy from 1943 to 1947. She was scrapped in 1969.

== History ==
USS Manning was named in honor of Ordnanceman Milburn A. Manning (1920–1941), who was killed in action during the Japanese attack on Pearl Harbor, 7 December 1941. Manning was laid down by Charleston Navy Yard, on 15 February 1943; launched on 1 June 1943; sponsored by Mrs. J. H. Hughes; and commissioned at the Charleston Navy Yard on 1 October 1943.

=== Solomon Islands ===
After shakedown off Bermuda, Manning departed Charleston Navy Yard on 12 December 1943 as escort for a troopship convoy. Steaming via Panama, she reached Pearl Harbor on 1 January 1944. Five days later she sailed for the South Pacific where, after touching the Ellice Islands, she reached Florida Island, Solomons, on 21 January. During the next two months she patrolled off Guadalcanal for submarines and escorted convoys from the Solomons to the New Hebrides, New Caledonia, and Samoa. In addition, she escorted a fleet oiler task group out of Espiritu Santo to an ocean rendezvous north of the Solomons. There on 26 March, the tankers refueled ships of the Fast Carrier Task Force prior to intensive raids by 3rd Fleet carriers against Japanese bases in the Carolines.

=== New Guinea ===
Manning departed the Solomons on 5 April and reached Milne Bay, New Guinea, the 7th to begin temporary duty with the 7th Fleet. Operating with Escort Division 37, she sailed in convoy 19 April and escorted transports and LSTs to Humboldt Bay where she arrived on the 24th. During the next two days, she screened the approaches to Humboldt Bay; thence, she returned to Cape Cretin on 29 April. After screening a reinforcement convoy to Aitape early in May, Manning continued to support the westward advance of the Allies in New Guinea. As escort for attack transports, she arrived off Wakde, New Guinea, on 17 May and screened to seaward during the amphibious invasion. She continued escort and ASW patrols along the northern coast of New Guinea until 24 June when she departed under tow to Espiritu Santo for repairs to damaged screws and shafts.

Arriving on 30 June, Manning underwent repairs and overhaul during the next month. Thence, she sailed for the Solomons on 14 August, and until 9 October she made convoy escort runs out of the Solomons to the Russells, the New Hebrides, the Admiralties, and New Guinea. She arrived at Manus on 11 October; and, after reporting for duty with the 7th Fleet, sailed the 15th to support the American invasion of the Philippines.

=== Philippines ===
Manning steamed to Kossol Passage, Palaus, where on 20 October, she joined other escorts as a screen for tankers and ammunition ships sailing to supply ships in Leyte Gulf. She arrived off Leyte on 23 October, and for more than a week she escorted ammunition ships during replenishment operations. Between 24 and 28 October, American ships repelled numerous Japanese air attacks. Gunfire from Manning splashed a twin-engined bomber during an evening attack on 24 October, and concentrated gunfire as well as chemical smoke helped drive off enemy planes and protect American shipping in the gulf.

Departing Leyte on 1 November, Manning steamed via Kossol to Humboldt Bay where she arrived the 6th. Eight days later, she joined the screen for a task group of transports, LSTs, and amphibious craft steaming via Biak to Leyte. The ships came under air attack at dusk on 23 November, but effective gunfire from the task group drove off the attackers. Manning entered Leyte Gulf early the 24th. As she screened the transport area, her 20 mm guns hit and repelled an enemy dive bomber.

Manning sailed with the LSTs for New Guinea later the same day and arrived Hollandia on 30 November. As flagship for CortDiv 37, she reported for duty with Service Force, 7th Fleet, on 1 December. During the next four weeks she took part in intensive anti-aircraft and ASW exercises off New Guinea. Thence, she joined the screen for a convoy of fleet oilers and sailed on 28 December for the Philippines and the invasion of Luzon.

Steaming via Leyte Gulf and Surigao Strait, Manning entered Mindanao Sea on 2 January 1945. That evening the task group repulsed enemy bombers, and during the next two days American gunfire effectively drove off additional air attacks. Manning reached Mangarin Bay, Mindoro, 4 January, and until 21 February she operated out of Mangarin Bay in support of Luzon operations. Beginning on 7 January, she screened fleet oilers during refueling of Lingayen attack ships in the South China Sea. She provided anti-aircraft and anti-submarine protection for tankers and ammunition ships anchored at Mangarin Bay, and she made ASW sweeps along the coast of Mindoro and Luzon. Thence, she returned to San Pedro Bay, Leyte, on 22 February and underwent tender availability until early March.

Manning reported for duty with the Philippine Sea frontier on 6 March. Two days later, she sailed in the screen of a convoy bound for the Admiralties. For more than two months she escorted convoys out of Leyte to New Guinea, the Palaus, the Admiralties, and back. As U.S. ground forces, buttressed by the might of American seapower, secured control of the Philippines, Manning, in mid-May, resumed ASW patrols in the South China Sea. Operating out of Manila, she patrolled the American convoy lanes from Subic Bay to the southern tip of Mindoro during the final three months of fighting in the western Pacific.

Manning completed her final patrol four days after the cessation of hostilities; and, as Japanese representatives signed the formal surrender documents on 2 September, she departed Subic Bay as escort for an Okinawa-bound convoy of LCTs and LCIs. After returning from Okinawa on 12 September, she sailed with other escorts of CortDiv 37 for the United States on 1 October. Steaming via the Marshalls and Pearl Harbor, she reached San Diego on 23 October and reported for duty with the San Diego group of the Pacific Reserve Fleet.

=== Decommissioning and fate ===
Manning decommissioned at San Diego on 15 January 1947 and was berthed first at San Diego, and, later at Bremerton, Washington. She was declared unfit for further naval service in mid-1968, and her name was struck from the Navy List on 31 July 1968. She was sold for scrapping on 27 October 1969 to the National Metal & Steel Company, Terminal Island, San Pedro, California (USA).

== Awards ==
Manning received four battle stars for World War II service.
