= USS Evarts =

Lead ship in her class of destroyer escorts

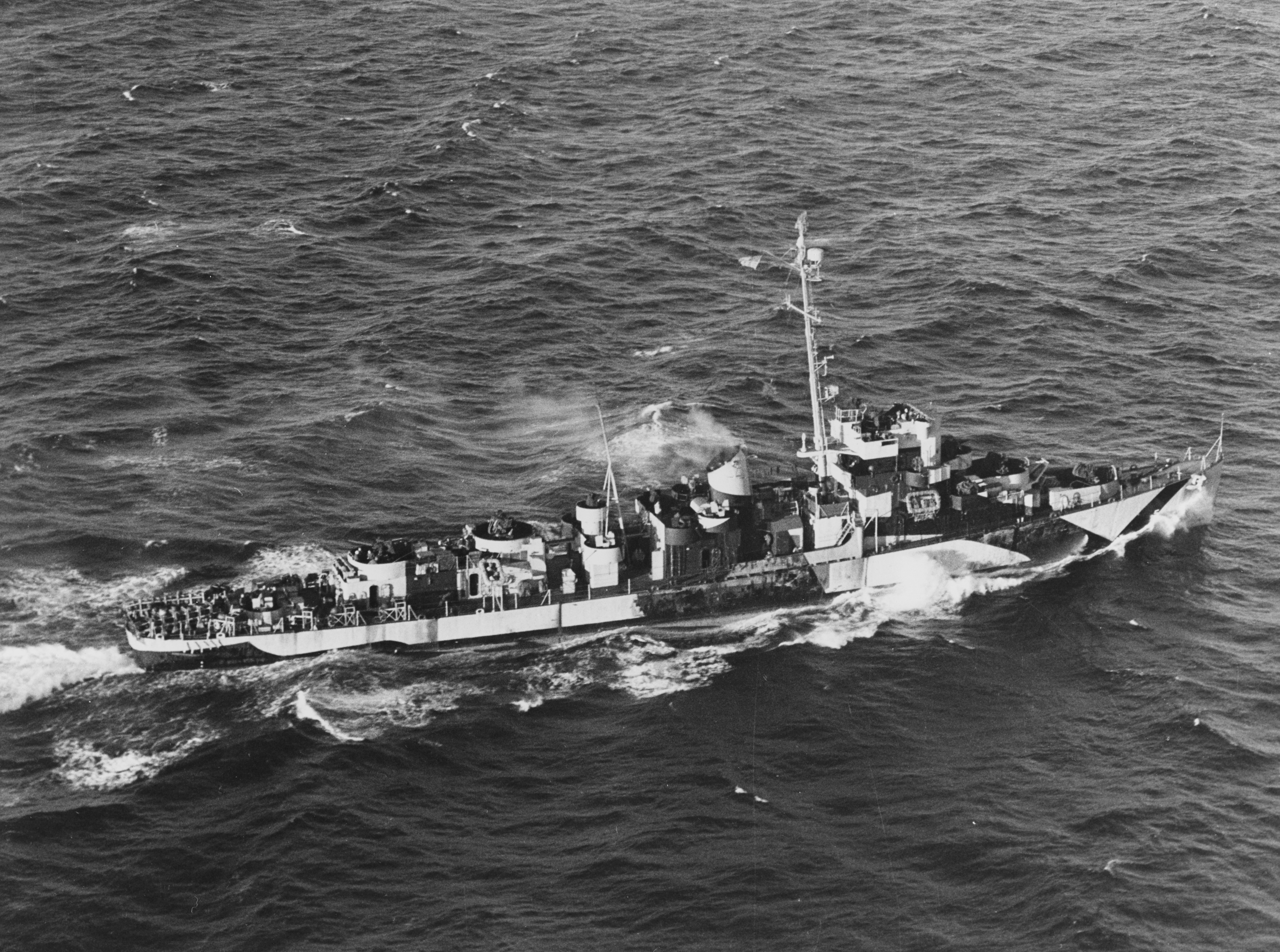
- USS Evarts (DE-5)

History

United States
- Name: USS Evarts
- Builder: Boston Navy Yard
- Laid down: 17 October 1942
- Launched: 7 December 1942
- Commissioned: 15 April 1943
- Decommissioned: 2 October 1945
- Fate: Scrapped 12 July 1946

General characteristics
- Class & type: Evarts-class destroyer escort
- Displacement: 1,140 long tons (1,158 t) (standard); 1,430 long tons (1,453 t) (full load)
- Length: 283 ft 6 in (86.41 m) w/l); 289 ft 5 in (88.21 m) (o/a)
- Beam: 35 ft 1 in (10.69 m)
- Draft: 8 ft 3 in (2.51 m)
- Installed power: 6,000 hp (4,500 kW)
- Propulsion: 4 × General Motors diesel engines with electric drive; 2 × screws
- Speed: 21 kn (24 mph; 39 km/h)
- Range: 4,150 nmi (4,780 mi; 7,690 km) at 12 kn (14 mph; 22 km/h)
- Complement: 198
- Armament: 3 × 3 in (76 mm)/50 cal dual purpose guns (3×1); 4 × 1.1"/75 caliber anti-aircraft guns (1×4); 9 × 20 mm (0.79 in) anti-aircraft cannons (9×1); 8 × depth charge throwers; 1 × 24-tube Hedgehog anti-submarine spigot mortar (144 rounds); 2 × depth charge tracks

USS Evarts (DE-5) was the lead ship of her class of destroyer escorts in the United States Navy.

== Design ==
The Evarts-class destroyer escorts were 289 ft 5 in (88.21 m) long overall, and they had a beam of 35 ft 2 in (10.72 m). They had an average draft of 10 ft 1 in (3.07 m) at their full load displacement of 1,416 long tons (1,439 t). Each ship had a normal crew numbered 156 officers and sailors.

Evarts was propelled by a pair of diesel motors manufactured by General Motors, which drove a pair of screw propellers. Her propulsion system was rated to produce 6,000 brake horsepower (4,500 kW) for a top speed of 19.5 knots (36.1 km/h; 22.4 mph). Oil storage amounted to between 131 and 197 long tons (133 and 200 t), which allowed a cruising radius of up to 6,000 nautical miles (11,000 km; 6,900 mi) at an economical pace of 10 knots (19 km/h; 12 mph).

The ship's armament consisted of a main battery of three 3-inch (76 mm) /50-caliber guns in individual pivot mounts, which could be used against air or surface targets. These were supported by a light anti-aircraft battery that initially consisted of four 1.1 in (28 mm) /75-caliber guns in a quadruple mount and nine 20 mm (0.79 in) Oerlikon guns. For attacks against submarines, the ship was equipped with a Hedgehog mortar, eight depth charge throwers, and two depth charge racks.

== Service history ==
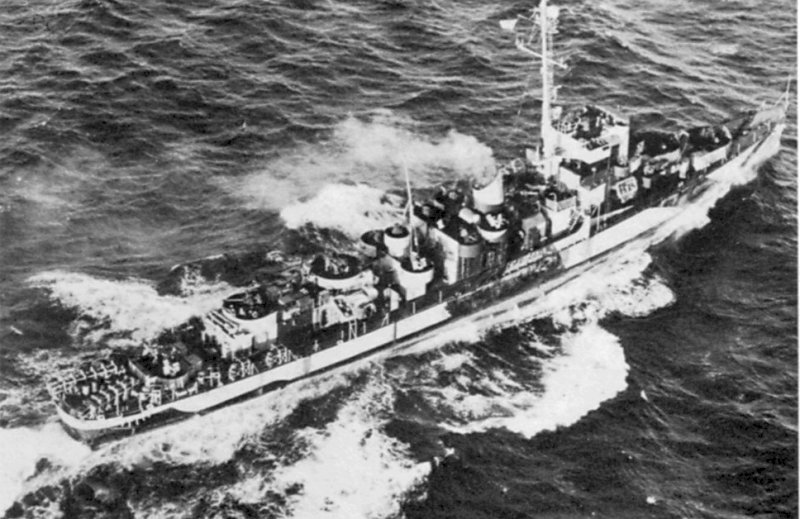
Evarts underway in 1944

The ship was built by the Boston Navy Yard in Boston, Massachusetts, originally ordered under the name BDE-5. The vessel was intended for the British Royal Navy, and was launched on 7 December 1942. Instead, the US Navy decided to keep the ship, which was renamed Evarts, after Milo Evarts, a naval officer killed during the Battle of Cape Esperance aboard the light cruiser USS Boise. The ship was commissioned on 15 April 1943. She thereafter conducted sea trials and then anti-submarine warfare training and experiments with radar in Chesapeake Bay to prepare the crew for combat.

Evarts thereafter began escorting convoys across the Atlantic, including as part of Task Force 62, which escorted convoy UGS.11 in July 1943. By September, Evarts had been transferred to Task Force 61, and that month she served as part of the escort for convoy UGS.16, which sailed to Gibraltar. After arriving in Gibraltar, the ships of TF 61 transferred to a home-bound convoy, GUS-15, later that month. Later convoys sailed to Casablanca in French Morocco; she made five such voyages over the following year.

A sixth convoy, this time bound for Bizerte in French Tunisia, departed Norfolk, Virginia on 22 April 1944. The ships passed Gibraltar on 9 May and entered the Mediterranean Sea. The convoy came under heavy attack from German torpedo bombers about two days from Bizerte, and Evarts contributed her guns to the convoy's defense. A pair of U-boats also attempted to attack the convoy, but they were unable to catch it. After the convoy's cargo was unloaded, the ships departed for the United States, and on 29 May, Evarts was detached to support the escort carrier Block Island and destroyer escort Barr, both of which had been torpedoed. By the time she arrived, however, Block Island had already sunk, so she took Barr under tow. The two ships sailed to Casablanca, and Evarts then returned to the US. She joined a second convoy to Bizerte, followed by one more such voyage to Palermo, Sicily, and then three to Oran in French Algeria. All of these crossings proceeded uneventfully.

The ship was released from convoy escort duties on 11 June 1945, by which time the war in Europe had ended. After returning to New London, Connecticut, Evarts was used as a target ship in exercises with submarines until early September. She then sailed to New York City on 11 September, where she was decommissioned on 2 October. She lingered in the reserve fleet only briefly, before being sold to ship breakers on 12 July 1946 and thereafter dismantled.

== Awards ==
- Combat Action Ribbon (retroactive)
- American Campaign Medal
- European–African–Middle Eastern Campaign Medal
- World War II Victory Medal

Evarts also received one battle star for her World War II service.
