= DE23 =

DE23 may refer to:

- Delaware Route 23
- ROCS Tai Ho (DE-23)
- USS Charles R. Greer (DE-23)
- DE23, a postcode district in Derby, England; see DE postcode area
