= Daniel Carlsson =

Daniel Carlsson may refer to:

- Daniel Carlsson (rally driver) (born 1976), Swedish rally car driver
- Daniel Carlsson (swimmer) (born 1976), Swedish swimmer

== See also ==
- Daniel Carlson (born 1995), American football placekicker
- Dan Carlson (born 1970), American baseball player
- Daniel Karlsson (born 1981), Swedish musician with the stage name The Moniker
- Daniel Carlson, namesake of the USS Carlson
