= DE48 =

DE48 may refer to:

- Delaware Route 48
- HMAS Stuart (DE 48)
- USS Dobler (DE-48)
