= DE14 =

DE14 may refer to:

- Delaware Route 14
- USS Doherty (DE-14)
- DE14, a postcode district in Burton-on-Trent, England; see DE postcode area
