= USS Sanders (DE-40) =

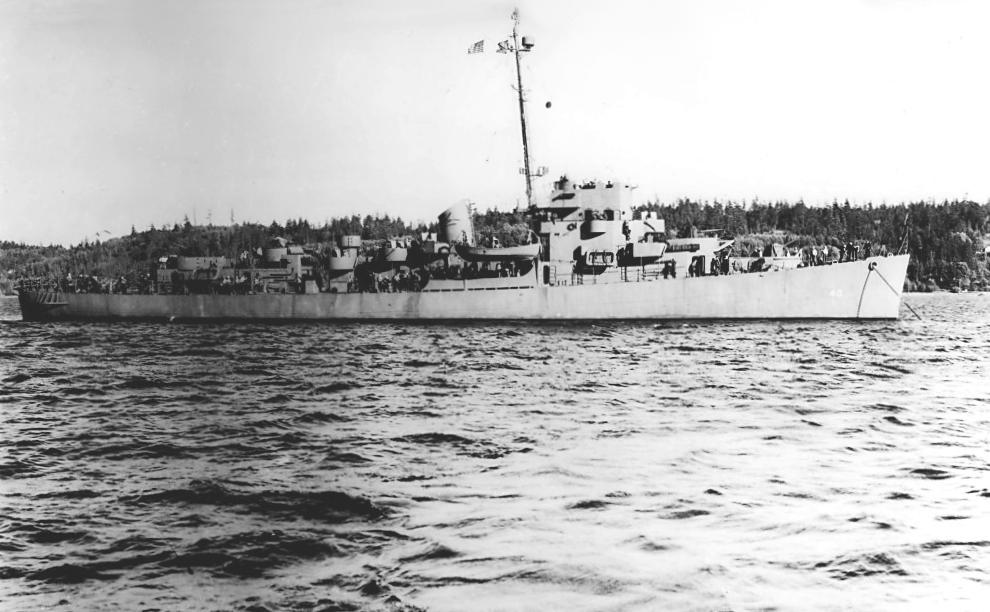
- Sanders at anchor on 15 October 1943

History

United States
- Name: BDE-40
- Builder: Puget Sound Navy Yard
- Laid down: 7 September 1942
- Launched: 18 June 1943
- Commissioned: 1 October 1943
- Decommissioned: 12 December 1945
- Reclassified: DE-40, 14 June 1943, USS Sanders, 16 June 1943
- Stricken: 8 January 1946
- Fate: Sold for scrap, 8 May 1947

General characteristics
- Class & type: Evarts-class destroyer escort
- Displacement: 1,140 long tons (1,160 t) (standard); 1,430 long tons (1,450 t) (full)
- Length: 289 ft 5 in (88.21 m) (oa); 283 ft 6 in (86.41 m) (wl)
- Beam: 35 ft 2 in (10.72 m)
- Draft: 11 ft 0 in (3.35 m) (max)
- Propulsion: 4 GM Model 16-278A diesel engines with electric drive, 6,000 shp (4,500 kW), 2 screws
- Speed: 19 knots (35 km/h; 22 mph)
- Range: 4,150 nmi (7,690 km; 4,780 mi)
- Complement: 15 officers / 183 enlisted
- Armament: 3 × 3 in (76 mm) Mk 22 (1×3), 1 × 1.1-inch/75-caliber gun Mk 2 quad AA (4×1), 9 × 20 mm Mk 4 AA, 1 Hedgehog Projector, Mk 10 (144 rounds), 8 Mk 6 depth charge projectors, 2 Mk 9 depth charge tracks

The second USS Sanders (DE-40) was an Evarts-class destroyer escort constructed for the United States Navy during World War II. She was sent to the Pacific Ocean to protect convoys and other shipping from Japanese submarines and fighter aircraft. She performed dangerous work in major battle areas and was awarded four battle stars.

== Design ==
The Evarts-class destroyer escorts were 289 ft 5 in (88.21 m) long overall, and they had a beam of 35 ft 2 in (10.72 m). They had an average draft of 10 ft 1 in (3.07 m) at their full load displacement of 1,416 long tons (1,439 t). Each ship had a normal crew numbered 156 officers and sailors.

Sanders was propelled by a pair of diesel motors manufactured by General Motors, which drove a pair of screw propellers. Her propulsion system was rated to produce 6,000 brake horsepower (4,500 kW) for a top speed of 19.5 knots (36.1 km/h; 22.4 mph). Oil storage amounted to between 131 and 197 long tons (133 and 200 t), which allowed a cruising radius of up to 6,000 nautical miles (11,000 km; 6,900 mi) at an economical pace of 10 knots (19 km/h; 12 mph).

The ship's armament consisted of a main battery of three 3-inch (76 mm) /50-caliber guns in individual pivot mounts, which could be used against air or surface targets. These were supported by a light anti-aircraft battery that initially consisted of four 1.1 in (28 mm) /75-caliber guns in a quadruple mount and nine 20 mm (0.79 in) Oerlikon guns. For attacks against submarines, the ship was equipped with a Hedgehog mortar, eight depth charge throwers, and two depth charge racks.

== Service history ==
She was originally designated for transfer to the United Kingdom. As BDE-40, she was laid down on 7 September 1942 by the Puget Sound Navy Yard, Bremerton, Washington. After being reallocated to the US Navy, the ship was renamed Sanders on 14 June 1943 and then reclassified DE-40 on 16 June 1943. The ship's namesake was Eugene Sanders, who was killed aboard USS Arizona during the attack on Pearl Harbor. The ship was launched on 18 June 1943 and commissioned on 1 October 1943.

After shakedown, Sanders participated in patrol and escort duties in the Gilbert and Marshall Islands from January–July 1944, including a bombardment of Kusaie Island on 1 June. She then escorted support shipping to the Mariana Islands from August through October. Following patrol and escort duties in the Gilbert and Marshall Islands from November–March 1945, she guarded a logistics support group, supplying fast carrier task forces in the western Pacific, from April–June. Sailing via Pearl Harbor, she arrived at San Francisco, California, on 15 July for overhaul.

Remaining on the United States West Coast, she was decommissioned on 19 December 1945. Struck from the Naval Vessel Register on 8 January 1946, she was delivered, on 8 May 1947, to the National Metal and Steel Corp., Terminal Island, California, and scrapped in 1948.

== Awards ==
- American Campaign Medal
- Asiatic-Pacific Campaign Medal (with four service stars)
- World War II Victory Medal
