= USS Doneff =

1942 Evarts-class destroyer escort

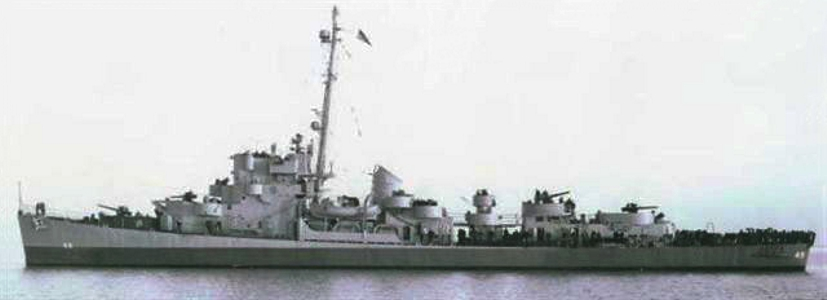
- USS Doneff in February 1945

History

United States
- Name: USS Doneff
- Builder: Philadelphia Navy Yard
- Launched: 24 July 1942
- Commissioned: 10 June 1943
- Decommissioned: 22 December 1945
- Fate: Sold for scrapping, 9 January 1947

General characteristics
- Type: Evarts-class destroyer escort
- Displacement: 1,140 long tons (1,158 t) standard; 1,430 long tons (1,453 t) full
- Length: 289 ft 5 in (88.21 m) o/a; 283 ft 6 in (86.41 m) w/l
- Beam: 35 ft 2 in (10.72 m)
- Draft: 11 ft (3.4 m) (max)
- Propulsion: 4 × General Motors Model 16-278A diesel engines with electric drive, 6,000 shp (4,474 kW); 2 screws
- Speed: 19 knots (35 km/h; 22 mph)
- Range: 4,150 nmi (7,690 km)
- Complement: 15 officers and 183 enlisted
- Armament: 3 × single 3"/50 Mk.22 dual purpose guns; 1 × quad 1.1"/75 Mk.2 AA gun; 9 × 20 mm Mk.4 AA guns; 1 × Hedgehog Projector Mk.10 (144 rounds); 8 × Mk.6 depth charge projectors; 2 × Mk.9 depth charge tracks

USS Doneff (DE-49) was an Evarts-class destroyer escort which served in the United States Navy in the Pacific Theater of Operations. The only encounter with the Imperial Japanese Navy was the sighting of one or two A6M Zero fighters during the operational time spent in the Aleutian Islands.

== Design ==
The Evarts-class destroyer escorts were 289 ft 5 in (88.21 m) long overall, and they had a beam of 35 ft 2 in (10.72 m). They had an average draft of 10 ft 1 in (3.07 m) at their full load displacement of 1,416 long tons (1,439 t). Each ship had a normal crew numbered 156 officers and sailors.

Doneff was propelled by a pair of diesel motors manufactured by General Motors, which drove a pair of screw propellers. Her propulsion system was rated to produce 6,000 brake horsepower (4,500 kW) for a top speed of 19.5 knots (36.1 km/h; 22.4 mph). Oil storage amounted to between 131 and 197 long tons (133 and 200 t), which allowed a cruising radius of up to 6,000 nautical miles (11,000 km; 6,900 mi) at an economical pace of 10 knots (19 km/h; 12 mph).

The ship's armament consisted of a main battery of three 3-inch (76 mm) /50-caliber guns in individual pivot mounts, which could be used against air or surface targets. These were supported by a light anti-aircraft battery that initially consisted of four 1.1 in (28 mm) /75-caliber guns in a quadruple mount and nine 20 mm (0.79 in) Oerlikon guns. For attacks against submarines, the ship was equipped with a Hedgehog mortar, eight depth charge throwers, and two depth charge racks.

== Service history ==
DE-49, originally intended for transfer to Britain, was launched on 24 July 1942 by Philadelphia Navy Yard. The ship was instead retained by the U.S. Navy and renamed Doneff on 4 March 1943. John Doneff, the ship's namesake, was a naval officer killed during the Battle of Tassafaronga on 30 November 1942. The ship was commissioned on 10 June 1943.

Doneff arrived at San Diego, California, as escort for a convoy on 9 September 1943. On 27 September she got underway for Alaskan waters and escort duty. From April 1944 she cruised between Attu and the Kurile Islands to report enemy contacts, forced landings of aircraft, and weather, and to guide planes and serve as rescue vessels in case of forced landings. She returned to Attu on 19 May for escort duty between Alaskan ports. Except for a period as guard ship again from 1 to 21 August 1944, she continued to escort convoys until 7 January 1945 when she sailed for San Francisco, California, and overhaul.

Arriving at Pearl Harbor on 9 March 1945 for exercises, Doneff got underway on 20 March to escort a convoy to Eniwetok, arriving there on 28 March. She served at Guam on patrol and local escort duty, then made anti-submarine patrols off Saipan until 6 August, when she sailed for Okinawa as a convoy escort for the USS Indianapolis, which carried the atomic bomb that was dropped on Hiroshima, returning to Saipan on 19 August. From 25 August to 23 September, she joined the destroyer Mayrant (DD-402) to receive the surrender of the Japanese garrison on Marcus Island and support occupation of the island by American troops.

After brief overhaul at Guam, Doneff put to sea on 11 October, arriving at San Pedro on 26 October. Doneff was decommissioned on 22 December 1945 at San Diego, and sold for scrapping on 9 January 1947.

== Awards ==
- American Campaign Medal
- Asiatic-Pacific Campaign Medal
- World War II Victory Medal
