= USS Canfield =

Evarts-class destroyer escort

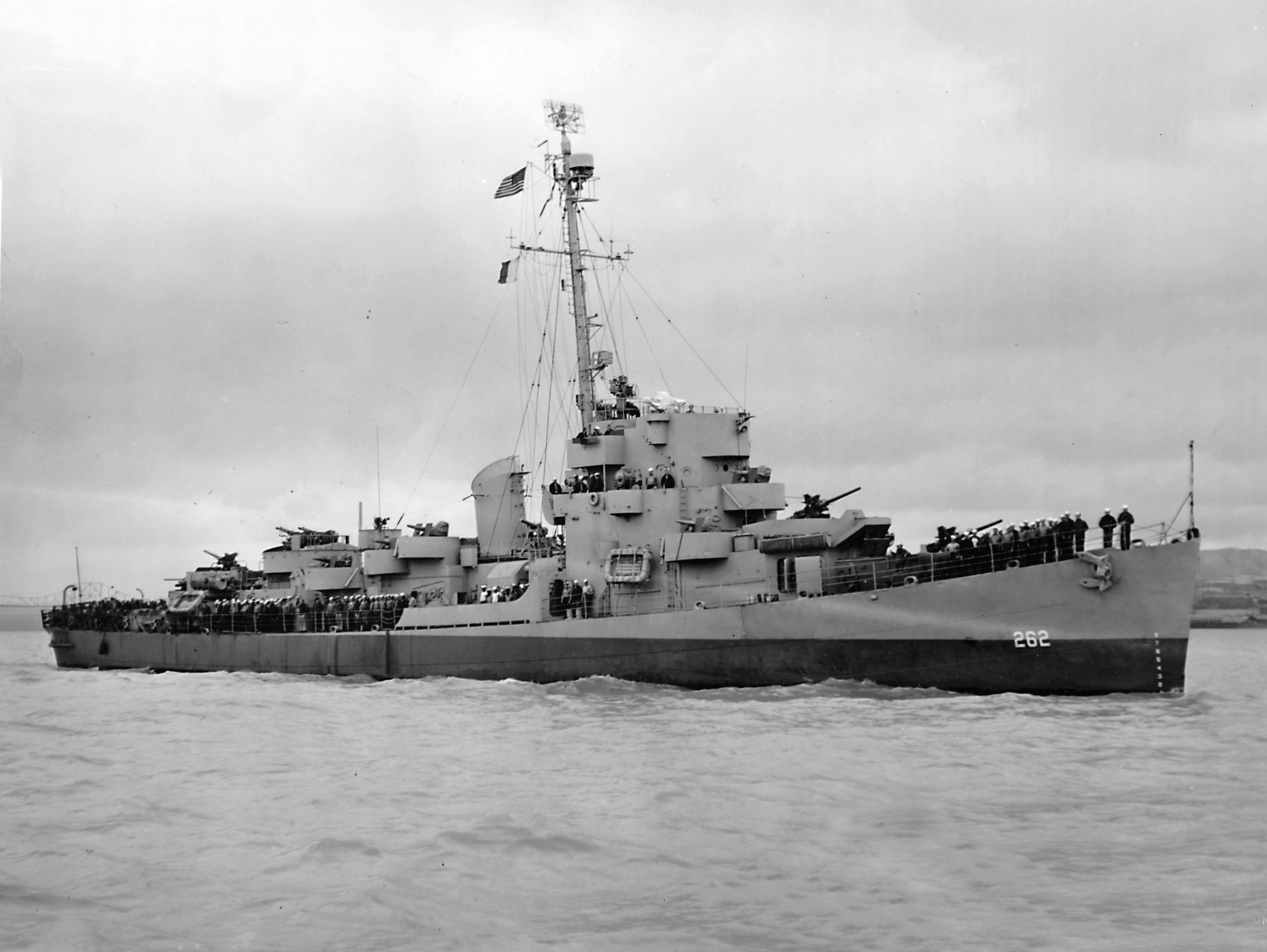
- Canfield on 16 May 1945

History

United States
- Name: USS Canfield (DE-262)
- Builder: Boston Navy Yard
- Laid down: 23 February 1943
- Launched: 6 April 1943
- Commissioned: 22 July 1943
- Decommissioned: 21 December 1945
- Stricken: 8 January 1946
- Honours and awards: 4 Battle Stars
- Fate: Sold for scrap, 12 June 1947

General characteristics
- Class & type: Evarts class destroyer escort
- Displacement: 1,140 (std), 1,430 tons (full)
- Length: 289 ft 5 in (88.21 m) (oa), 283 ft 6 in (86.41 m) (wl)
- Beam: 35 ft 2 in (10.72 m)
- Draft: 11 ft 0 in (3.35 m) (max)
- Propulsion: 4 GM Model 16-278A diesel engines with electric drive, 6000 shp, 2 screws
- Speed: 19 knots
- Range: 4,150 nm
- Complement: 15 officers / 183 enlisted
- Armament: 3 × 3 in (76 mm) Mk 22 (1×3), 1 × 1.1"/75 caliber gun Mk 2 quad AA (4×1), 9 × 20 mm Mk 4 AA, 1 Hedgehog Projector, Mk 10 (144 rounds), 8 Mk 6 depth charge projectors, 2 Mk 9 depth charge tracks

USS Canfield (DE-262) was an Evarts-class destroyer escort constructed for the United States Navy during World War II. She was sent off into the Pacific Ocean to protect convoys and other ships from Japanese submarines and fighter aircraft. She performed escort and antisubmarine operations in dangerous battle areas and returned home with four battle stars.

== Design ==
The Evarts-class destroyer escorts were 289 ft 5 in (88.21 m) long overall, and they had a beam of 35 ft 2 in (10.72 m). They had an average draft of 10 ft 1 in (3.07 m) at their full load displacement of 1,416 long tons (1,439 t). Each ship had a normal crew numbered 156 officers and sailors.

Canfield was propelled by a pair of diesel motors manufactured by General Motors, which drove a pair of screw propellers. Her propulsion system was rated to produce 6,000 brake horsepower (4,500 kW) for a top speed of 19.5 knots (36.1 km/h; 22.4 mph). Oil storage amounted to between 131 and 197 long tons (133 and 200 t), which allowed a cruising radius of up to 6,000 nautical miles (11,000 km; 6,900 mi) at an economical pace of 10 knots (19 km/h; 12 mph).

The ship's armament consisted of a main battery of three 3-inch (76 mm) /50-caliber guns in individual pivot mounts, which could be used against air or surface targets. These were supported by a light anti-aircraft battery that initially consisted of four 1.1 in (28 mm) /75-caliber guns in a quadruple mount and nine 20 mm (0.79 in) Oerlikon guns. For attacks against submarines, the ship was equipped with a Hedgehog mortar, eight depth charge throwers, and two depth charge racks.

== Service history ==
The new destroyer escort was named after Leon Canfield, a naval officer killed aboard the battleship USS South Dakota in the Naval Battle of Guadalcanal. Canfield was launched on 6 April 1943 by Boston Navy Yard; sponsored by the widow of the ship's namesake, and was commissioned on 22 July 1943. Canfield sailed from Boston, Massachusetts on 13 October 1943 for Pearl Harbor, arriving on 17 November. From 25 November – 10 December, she screened the vital but vulnerable tankers supporting air strikes on the Marshall Islands.

In January, Canfield sailed to Majuro, from which base she continued to operate on convoy escort, patrol, and plane guard in the Marshalls operation. Returning to Pearl Harbor in April 1944, Canfield got underway on 6 May escorting a tanker convoy bound for Majuro. Here she resumed escort duties, now supporting the Marianas operation. In September, the escort vessel arrived at Eniwetok, and until December, guarded convoys to the forward base at Ulithi. These convoys carried the men and supplies essential to the Philippines operation. Early in March 1945, after a visit to Pearl Harbor, Canfield arrived off Iwo Jima, and served on patrol during the assault and capture of the northern part of the island. On 20 March, she embarked men of the veteran 4th Marines for transportation to Pearl Harbor.

Canfield continued to San Francisco, California, for overhaul, and San Diego, California, for refresher training, returning to Pearl Harbor on 7 June. After a month of antisubmarine and plane guard duty, she sailed for San Pedro Bay, Philippine Islands, where she joined a Japan-bound occupation convoy. Canfield anchored in Tokyo Bay on 20 September. On 6 October, Canfield was underway for San Francisco. Here, she was decommissioned on 21 December 1945, and sold for scrap on 12 June 1947.

== Awards ==
Canfield received four battle stars for World War II service.
