= USS Lovering (DE-39) =

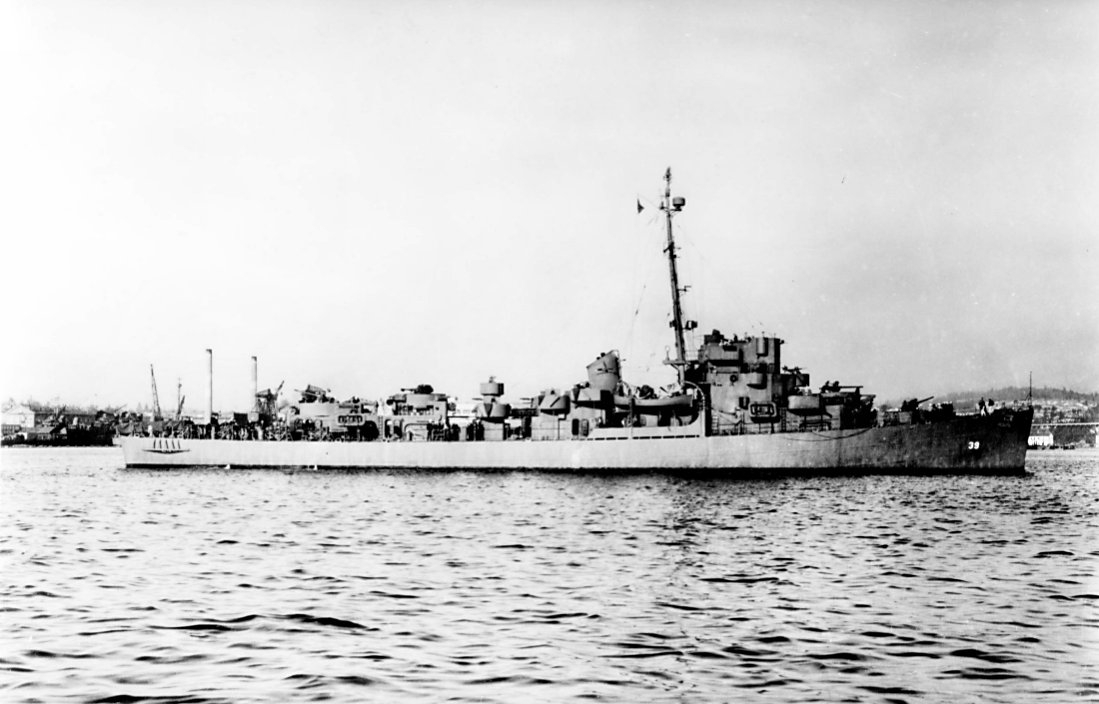
- Lovering on 25 November 1943

History

United States
- Name: USS Lovering (DE-39)
- Namesake: William B. Lovering
- Laid down: 7 September 1942
- Launched: 18 June 1943
- Commissioned: 17 September 1943
- Decommissioned: 16 October 1945
- Renamed: Lovering, 14 June 1943
- Stricken: 1 November 1945
- Honors and awards: 3 battle stars (World War II)
- Fate: Sold for scrapping, 31 December 1946

General characteristics
- Type: Evarts-class destroyer escort
- Displacement: 1,140 long tons (1,158 t) standard; 1,430 long tons (1,453 t) full
- Length: 289 ft 5 in (88.21 m) o/a; 283 ft 6 in (86.41 m) w/l
- Beam: 35 ft 2 in (10.72 m)
- Draft: 11 ft (3.4 m) (max)
- Propulsion: 4 × General Motors Model 16-278A diesel engines with electric drive, 6,000 shp (4,474 kW); 2 screws
- Speed: 19 knots (35 km/h; 22 mph)
- Range: 4,150 nmi (7,690 km)
- Complement: 15 officers and 183 enlisted
- Armament: 3 × single 3"/50 Mk.22 dual purpose guns; 1 × quad 1.1"/75 Mk.2 AA gun; 9 × 20 mm Mk.4 AA guns; 1 × Hedgehog Projector Mk.10 (144 rounds); 8 × Mk.6 depth charge projectors; 2 × Mk.9 depth charge tracks

USS Lovering (DE-39) was an Evarts-class destroyer escort of the United States Navy during World War II. She was promptly sent off into the Pacific Ocean to protect convoys and other ships from Japanese submarines and fighter aircraft. She performed dangerous work in major battle areas and sailed home with three battle stars.

== Design ==
The Evarts-class destroyer escorts were 289 ft 5 in (88.21 m) long overall, and they had a beam of 35 ft 2 in (10.72 m). They had an average draft of 10 ft 1 in (3.07 m) at their full load displacement of 1,416 long tons (1,439 t). Each ship had a normal crew numbered 156 officers and sailors.

Lovering was propelled by a pair of diesel motors manufactured by General Motors, which drove a pair of screw propellers. Her propulsion system was rated to produce 6,000 brake horsepower (4,500 kW) for a top speed of 19.5 knots (36.1 km/h; 22.4 mph). Oil storage amounted to between 131 and 197 long tons (133 and 200 t), which allowed a cruising radius of up to 6,000 nautical miles (11,000 km; 6,900 mi) at an economical pace of 10 knots (19 km/h; 12 mph).

The ship's armament consisted of a main battery of three 3-inch (76 mm) /50-caliber guns in individual pivot mounts, which could be used against air or surface targets. These were supported by a light anti-aircraft battery that initially consisted of four 1.1 in (28 mm) /75-caliber guns in a quadruple mount and nine 20 mm (0.79 in) Oerlikon guns. For attacks against submarines, the ship was equipped with a Hedgehog mortar, eight depth charge throwers, and two depth charge racks.

== Service history ==
She was originally scheduled for transfer to Great Britain, was laid down as BDE-39 on 7 September 1942 by Puget Sound Navy Yard, Bremerton, Washington. Ordered retained for use by the Navy, she was renamed as Lovering on 14 June 1943 and reclassified DE-39 on 16 June. The ship was named after William Lovering, who had been killed aboard USS Hammann during the Battle of Midway on 6 June 1942. Launched on 18 June 1943, she was commissioned on 11 September 1943.

Lovering began her 25 months of naval service with a coastal shakedown cruise and an intense training period operating with carriers, destroyers, and submarines. Departing San Francisco, California, on 4 December 1943, she arrived Pearl Harbor on 16 December. She departed four days later on an escort voyage to the Gilbert Islands. Arriving on 28 December she operated out of the Gilberts for the next six months. Sailing mainly from Tarawa, she performed numerous escort assignments to Kwajalein and Majuro in the nearby Marshall Islands after they were declared secure on 7 February 1944. Eniwetok became a terminus after its seizure on the 22nd.

Returning to Pearl Harbor on 27 July, Lovering underwent a period in drydock and then served as a target and training vessel for submarines. She continued this duty after returning to the Marshall Islands on 19 September. Late in October she commenced a series of escort missions to Saipan and Guam in the Marianas. These concluded on 10 March 1945 when, having steamed to Ulithi, she began her final assignment as a screening and escort vessel for logistic support groups of the variously designated 3rd and 5th Fleets. The Iwo Jima and Ryukyus invasion areas were her main theaters of action before departing for home on 9 July.

Lovering arrived San Pedro, Los Angeles, on 28 July. Her overhaul was prematurely halted on 17 August. Towed to Terminal Island, California, on 6 September, she decommissioned on 16 October. Struck from the Naval Vessel Register on 1 November 1945, she was sold to Hugo Neu of New York City on the last day of 1946.

== Awards ==
- Combat Action Ribbon (retroactive)
- American Campaign Medal
- Asiatic-Pacific Campaign Medal (with three service stars)
- World War II Victory Medal
