= USS Smartt =

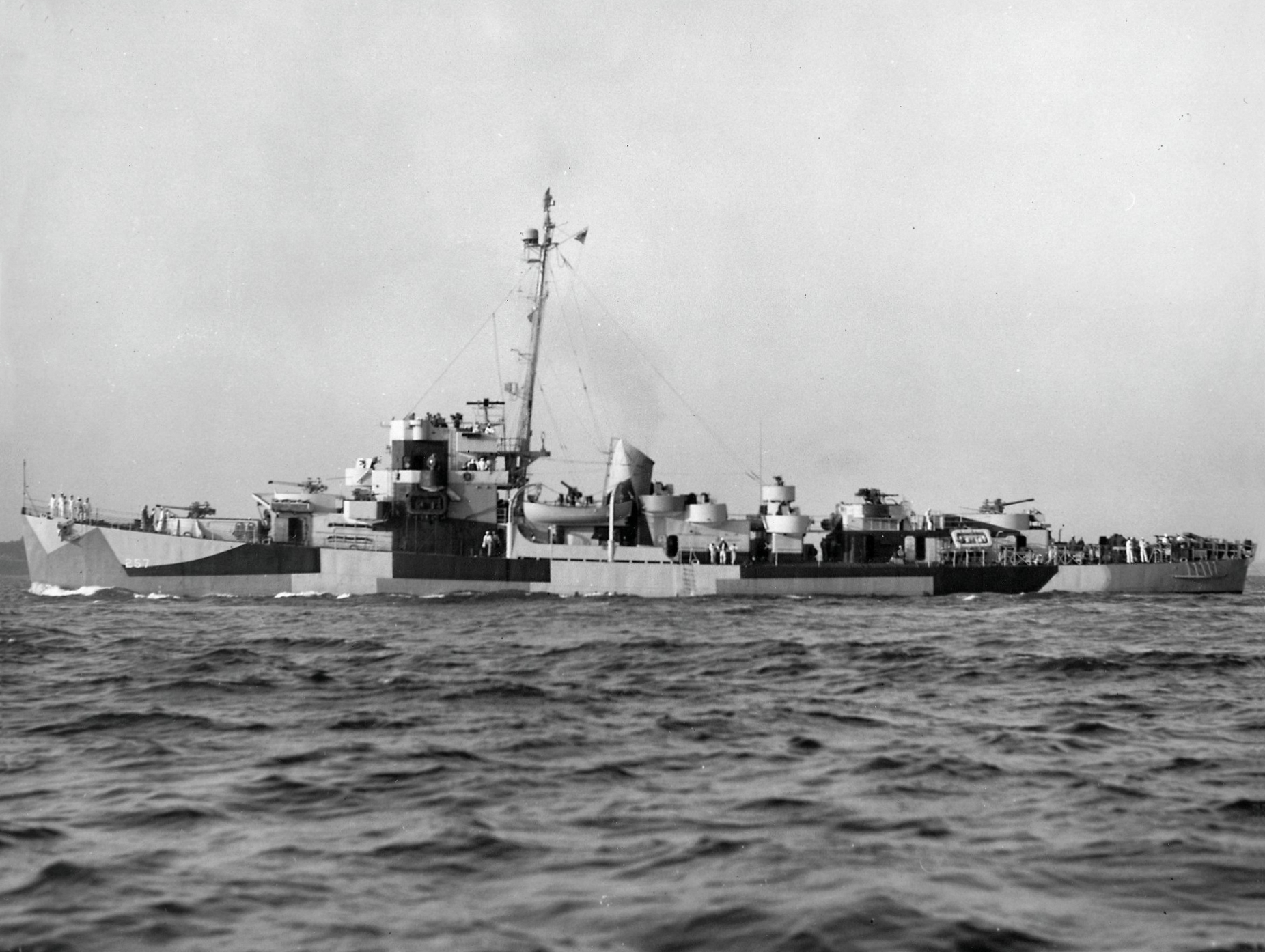
- Smartt underway c. 1943

History

United States
- Name: USS Smartt
- Builder: Boston Navy Yard
- Laid down: 10 January 1943
- Launched: 22 February 1943
- Commissioned: 18 June 1943
- Decommissioned: 5 October 1945
- Stricken: 24 October 1945
- Honors and awards: 1 battle star (World War II)
- Fate: Sold for scrapping, 12 July 1946

General characteristics
- Type: Evarts-class destroyer escort
- Displacement: 1,140 long tons (1,158 t) standard; 1,430 long tons (1,453 t) full
- Length: 289 ft 5 in (88.21 m) o/a; 283 ft 6 in (86.41 m) w/l
- Beam: 35 ft 2 in (10.72 m)
- Draft: 11 ft (3.4 m) (max)
- Propulsion: 4 × General Motors Model 16-278A diesel engines with electric drive, 6,000 shp (4,474 kW); 2 screws
- Speed: 19 knots (35 km/h; 22 mph)
- Range: 4,150 nmi (7,690 km)
- Complement: 15 officers and 183 enlisted
- Armament: 3 × single 3"/50 Mk.22 dual purpose guns; 1 × quad 1.1"/75 Mk.2 AA gun; 9 × 20 mm Mk.4 AA guns; 1 × Hedgehog Projector Mk.10 (144 rounds); 8 × Mk.6 depth charge projectors; 2 × Mk.9 depth charge tracks

USS Smartt (DE-257) was an Evarts-class destroyer escort of the United States Navy during World War II. She took part in operations in the Atlantic Ocean to protect convoys and other ships from German submarines and fighter aircraft. She performed escort and antisubmarine operations in battle areas before sailing home at the end of the conflict.

== Design ==
The Evarts-class destroyer escorts were 289 ft 5 in (88.21 m) long overall, and they had a beam of 35 ft 2 in (10.72 m). They had an average draft of 10 ft 1 in (3.07 m) at their full load displacement of 1,416 long tons (1,439 t). Each ship had a normal crew numbered 156 officers and sailors.

Smartt was propelled by a pair of diesel motors manufactured by General Motors, which drove a pair of screw propellers. Her propulsion system was rated to produce 6,000 brake horsepower (4,500 kW) for a top speed of 19.5 knots (36.1 km/h; 22.4 mph). Oil storage amounted to between 131 and 197 long tons (133 and 200 t), which allowed a cruising radius of up to 6,000 nautical miles (11,000 km; 6,900 mi) at an economical pace of 10 knots (19 km/h; 12 mph).

The ship's armament consisted of a main battery of three 3-inch (76 mm) /50-caliber guns in individual pivot mounts, which could be used against air or surface targets. These were supported by a light anti-aircraft battery that initially consisted of four 1.1 in (28 mm) /75-caliber guns in a quadruple mount and nine 20 mm (0.79 in) Oerlikon guns. For attacks against submarines, the ship was equipped with a Hedgehog mortar, eight depth charge throwers, and two depth charge racks.

== Service history ==
She was laid down on 10 January 1943 by the Boston Navy Yard, Boston, Massachusetts. The ship was named for Joseph Smartt, a naval aviator killed during the attack on Pearl Harbor. Smartt was launched on 22 February 1943 and commissioned on 18 June 1943. Smartt fitted out at Boston and sailed on 6 July to Bermuda, B.W.L., for her shakedown cruise which lasted until 7 August when she returned for yard availability. She steamed to Norfolk, Virginia, on the 23rd and, four days later, departed that port with a convoy bound for North Africa. The convoy passed through the Straits of Gibraltar on 13 September, and the merchant ships were turned over to British control. The convoy reformed on the 17th and sailed for Brooklyn, New York, arriving on 5 October. Between 25 October 1943 and 20 April 1944, Smartt escorted three convoys from New York to Casablanca and back.

On 23 April, Smartt sailed from Norfolk with Escort Division 5 as escort for convoy UGS-40 en route to the Mediterranean. The convoy was attacked near Algiers on 11 May by German dive-bombers. The escorts laid a smoke screen, and Smartt took three Ju 88's under fire, observing hits on all three. A second wave of three came in on the port quarter, near the water. One of these was splashed approximately 2,000 yards from the escort. In the third wave of the attack, two planes came along the ship's starboard side, and she picked them up out of the smoke at approximately 1,500 yards. Her gunners splashed one, and the other was smoking profusely as it passed out of range. The convoy continued to Bizerte, Tunisia, and arrived on 13 May. Smartt joined convoy. GUS-40, consisting of 65 ships, the following week and returned to New York.

Between 4 July 1944 and 14 June 1945, Smartt made six convoy escort voyages from the United States to the Mediterranean and return. When the escort returned to New York with its last convoy, it remained there until 10 July for upkeep. The escort moved to Casco Bay, Maine, and conducted local operations there from 18 July to 10 September when she returned to New York for inactivation. Smartt was placed out of commission, in reserve, on 5 October. She was struck from the Navy List on 24 October 1945 and sold for scrap on 12 July 1946.

== Awards ==
Smartt received one battle star for World War II service.
