= USS John M. Bermingham =

US Navy destroyer escort

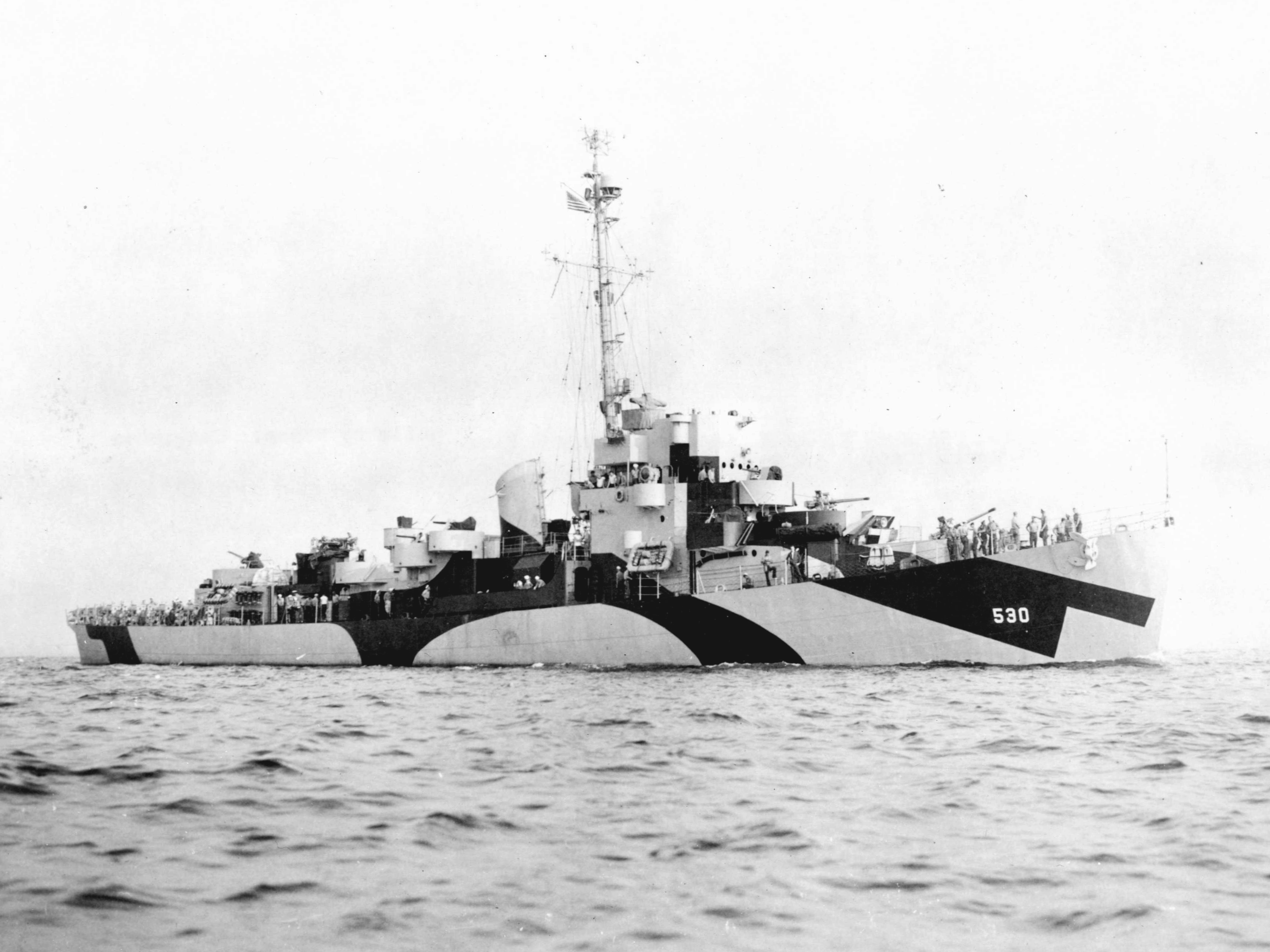
- USS John M. Bermingham (DE-530) in 1944

History

United States
- Name: USS John M. Bermingham (DE-530)
- Namesake: Lieutenant Commander John Michael Bermingham
- Builder: Boston Navy Yard
- Laid down: 14 October 1943
- Launched: 17 November 1943
- Commissioned: 4 April 1944
- Decommissioned: 16 October 1945
- Stricken: 1 November 1945
- Fate: Sold for scrap, March 1946

General characteristics
- Class & type: Evarts class destroyer escort
- Displacement: 1,140 (std), 1,430 tons (full)
- Length: 289 ft 5 in (88.21 m) (oa), 283 ft 6 in (86.41 m) (wl)
- Beam: 35 ft 2 in (10.72 m)
- Draft: 11 ft 0 in (3.35 m) (max)
- Propulsion: 4 GM Model 16-278A diesel engines with electric drive, 6000 shp, 2 screws
- Speed: 19 knots
- Range: 4,150 nm
- Complement: 15 officers / 183 enlisted
- Armament: 3 × 3 in (76 mm) Mk 22 (1×3), 1 × 1.1"/75 caliber gun Mk 2 quad AA (4×1), 9 × 20 mm Mk 4 AA, 1 Hedgehog Projector, Mk 10 (144 rounds), 8 Mk 6 depth charge projectors, 2 Mk 9 depth charge tracks

USS John M. Bermingham (DE-530) was an Evarts class destroyer escort constructed for the United States Navy during World War II. She was sent off into North Atlantic Ocean waters to protect convoys and other ships from German submarines and fighter aircraft. She performed escort and antisubmarine operations in battle areas before being retired and subsequently scrapped.

== Design ==
The Evarts-class destroyer escorts were 289 ft 5 in (88.21 m) long overall, and they had a beam of 35 ft 2 in (10.72 m). They had an average draft of 10 ft 1 in (3.07 m) at their full load displacement of 1,416 long tons (1,439 t). Each ship had a normal crew numbered 156 officers and sailors.

John M. Bermingham was propelled by a pair of diesel motors manufactured by General Motors, which drove a pair of screw propellers. Her propulsion system was rated to produce 6,000 brake horsepower (4,500 kW) for a top speed of 19.5 knots (36.1 km/h; 22.4 mph). Oil storage amounted to between 131 and 197 long tons (133 and 200 t), which allowed a cruising radius of up to 6,000 nautical miles (11,000 km; 6,900 mi) at an economical pace of 10 knots (19 km/h; 12 mph).

The ship's armament consisted of a main battery of three 3-inch (76 mm) /50-caliber guns in individual pivot mounts, which could be used against air or surface targets. These were supported by a light anti-aircraft battery that initially consisted of four 1.1 in (28 mm) /75-caliber guns in a quadruple mount and nine 20 mm (0.79 in) Oerlikon guns. For attacks against submarines, the ship was equipped with a Hedgehog mortar, eight depth charge throwers, and two depth charge racks.

== Service history ==
The ship was laid down by Boston Navy Yard on 14 October 1943, and was named after John Bermingham, who was killed in the Japanese Bombing of Darwin. The ship was launched on 17 November 1943; sponsored by Bermingham's widow. John M. Bermingham was commissioned 8 April 1944.

The new destroyer escort conducted shakedown off Bermuda and arrived Charleston, South Carolina, on 9 June to begin her vital convoy escort duty. Departing on 14 June, she escorted the ships to the English Channel; and, after steaming to Belfast on 23 July, she returned to Boston, Massachusetts on 2 August 1944. She then underwent further training in Casco Bay before arriving New York on 28 August to join an unusual convoy.

Bermingham sailed on 19 September with other escort vessels to convoy a large group of Army tugs and barges for use in the important captured ports of northern France. During the arduous crossing, rough weather claimed several tugs and many of the vitally-needed harbor barges. Only a heroic effort on the part of escorting ships brought the remainder of the convoy to safety at Plymouth on 20 October. After a week of searching for straggling barges, the ship joined a return convoy and arrived New York on 21 November.

After training, Bermingham was assigned to regular convoy runs between American ports and Oran, Algeria, in support of the giant land offensive underway in Europe. She made three voyages to Oran in the months that followed, arriving New York on 29 May 1945. Her mission in Europe completed with the fall of the Axis, the ship arrived on Miami, Florida, 20 July for duty as a school ship at the Naval Training Center. Bermingham sailed to Charleston, South Carolina, after V-J Day, arrived on 9 September, and decommissioned on 12 October. She was scrapped in March 1946.
