= USS Lyman =

1943 Evarts-class destroyer escort

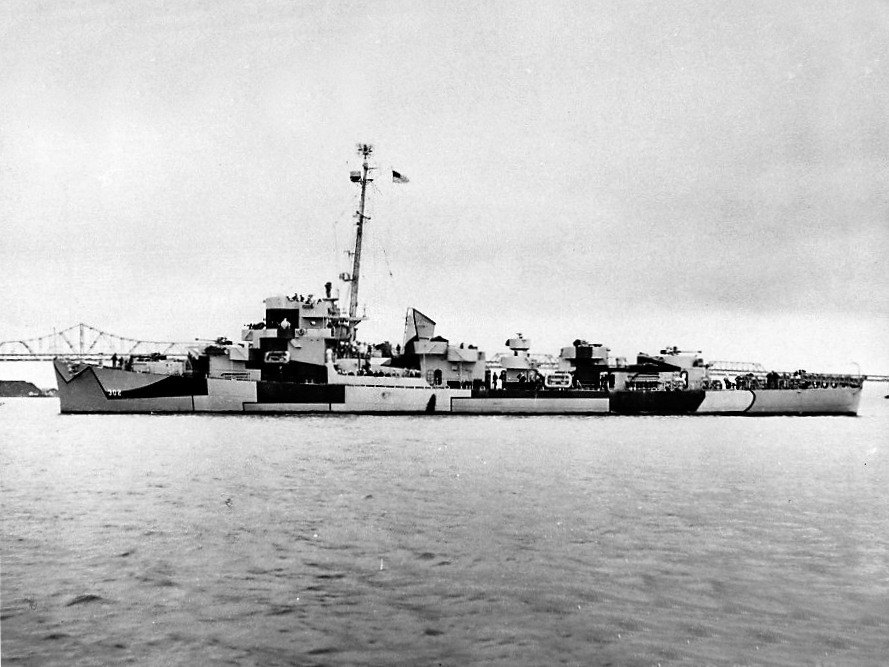
- Lyman underway on 23 April 1944

History

United States
- Name: USS Lyman
- Builder: Mare Island Navy Yard
- Laid down: 22 April 1943
- Launched: 19 August 1943
- Commissioned: 19 February 1944
- Decommissioned: 5 December 1945
- Stricken: 19 December 1945
- Honors and awards: 5 battle stars (World War II)
- Fate: Sold for scrapping, 26 December 1946

General characteristics
- Type: Evarts-class destroyer escort
- Displacement: 1,140 long tons (1,158 t) standard; 1,430 long tons (1,453 t) full
- Length: 289 ft 5 in (88.21 m) o/a; 283 ft 6 in (86.41 m) w/l
- Beam: 35 ft 2 in (10.72 m)
- Draft: 11 ft (3.4 m) (max)
- Propulsion: 4 × General Motors Model 16-278A diesel engines with electric drive, 6,000 shp (4,474 kW); 2 screws
- Speed: 19 knots (35 km/h; 22 mph)
- Range: 4,150 nmi (7,690 km)
- Complement: 15 officers and 183 enlisted
- Armament: 3 × single 3"/50 Mk.22 dual purpose guns; 1 × quad 1.1"/75 Mk.2 AA gun; 9 × 20 mm Mk.4 AA guns; 1 × Hedgehog Projector Mk.10 (144 rounds); 8 × Mk.6 depth charge projectors; 2 × Mk.9 depth charge tracks

USS Lyman (DE-302) was an Evarts-class destroyer escort of the United States Navy during World War II. She served in the Pacific Theatre, escorting convoys and other ships. She received a total of five battle stars for her service during the war, but was decommissioned and sold for scrap within 18 months of the war's end.

== Design ==
The Evarts-class destroyer escorts were 289 ft 5 in (88.21 m) long overall, and they had a beam of 35 ft 2 in (10.72 m). They had an average draft of 10 ft 1 in (3.07 m) at their full load displacement of 1,416 long tons (1,439 t). Each ship had a normal crew numbered 156 officers and sailors.

Lyman was propelled by a pair of diesel motors manufactured by General Motors, which drove a pair of screw propellers. Her propulsion system was rated to produce 6,000 brake horsepower (4,500 kW) for a top speed of 19.5 knots (36.1 km/h; 22.4 mph). Oil storage amounted to between 131 and 197 long tons (133 and 200 t), which allowed a cruising radius of up to 6,000 nautical miles (11,000 km; 6,900 mi) at an economical pace of 10 knots (19 km/h; 12 mph).

The ship's armament consisted of a main battery of three 3-inch (76 mm) /50-caliber guns in individual pivot mounts, which could be used against air or surface targets. These were supported by a light anti-aircraft battery that initially consisted of four 1.1 in (28 mm) /75-caliber guns in a quadruple mount and nine 20 mm (0.79 in) Oerlikon guns. For attacks against submarines, the ship was equipped with a Hedgehog mortar, eight depth charge throwers, and two depth charge racks.

== Service history ==
The ship's namesake, Chan Lyman, was a naval officer killed aboard the fleet oiler USS Neosho during the Battle of the Coral Sea. Lyman was laid down on 22 April 1943 by Mare Island Navy Yard, California; launched on 19 August 1943; sponsored by the widow of the ship's namesake. Lyman was commissioned on 19 February 1944. Lyman cleared San Francisco Bay on 23 April 1944 for duty at Pearl Harbor as a training ship. With other destroyer escorts, she acted as target for fleet submarines and screen for escort carriers training flight squadrons.

On 20 August she departed Pearl Harbor and began 13 months screening the supply ships of the U.S. 3rd Fleet and U.S. 5th Fleet. Arriving off Kossol Passage on 20 September, she screened the Western Garrison Group during the invasions of the Palau Islands. Departing Peleliu on 22 October, Lyman formed part of the escort which brought the 1st Marines to the Russell Islands. Her first port availability period at Manus, Admiralty Islands, was marked on 10 November by the explosion of the Mount Hood (AE-11) an ammunition ship nearby. A week later at Ulithi, a Japanese midget submarine managed to torpedo an oiler, the Mississinewa (AO-59), in the same anchorage. Lyman weighed anchor on 16 December, screening auxiliaries supporting the invasion of Lingayen Gulf, Luzon. She returned to Ulithi on 14 January 1945, but again early in February was at sea protecting a replenishment group during the capture of Iwo Jima.

Her logistic support group was also in the Ryukyus from 22 March to 11 June supporting the battle for strategically important Okinawa. During this later action a typhoon of 5 June caused the ship to roll 65 degrees forcing the withdrawal of Lyman for repairs. Underway again on 3 July, the destroyer escort ended the war guarding the supply ships of the 3rd Fleet, then striking the Japanese home islands. Lyman was the first DE to enter Tokyo Bay on 30 August with a group of tankers, she remained to witness the surrender ceremony of 2 September. Departing the next day she steamed eastward collecting passengers at each stop. She debarked 80 veterans at San Francisco on 8 October. Inactivation began almost immediately and was completed after Lyman sailed to Richmond, California, on 8 November. Decommissioned on 5 December 1945, she was sold to the Puget Sound Navigation Co., Seattle, Washington, on 26 December 1946.

== Awards ==
Lyman received five battle stars for World War II service.
