= Evarts-class destroyer escort =

Class of American destroyer escorts

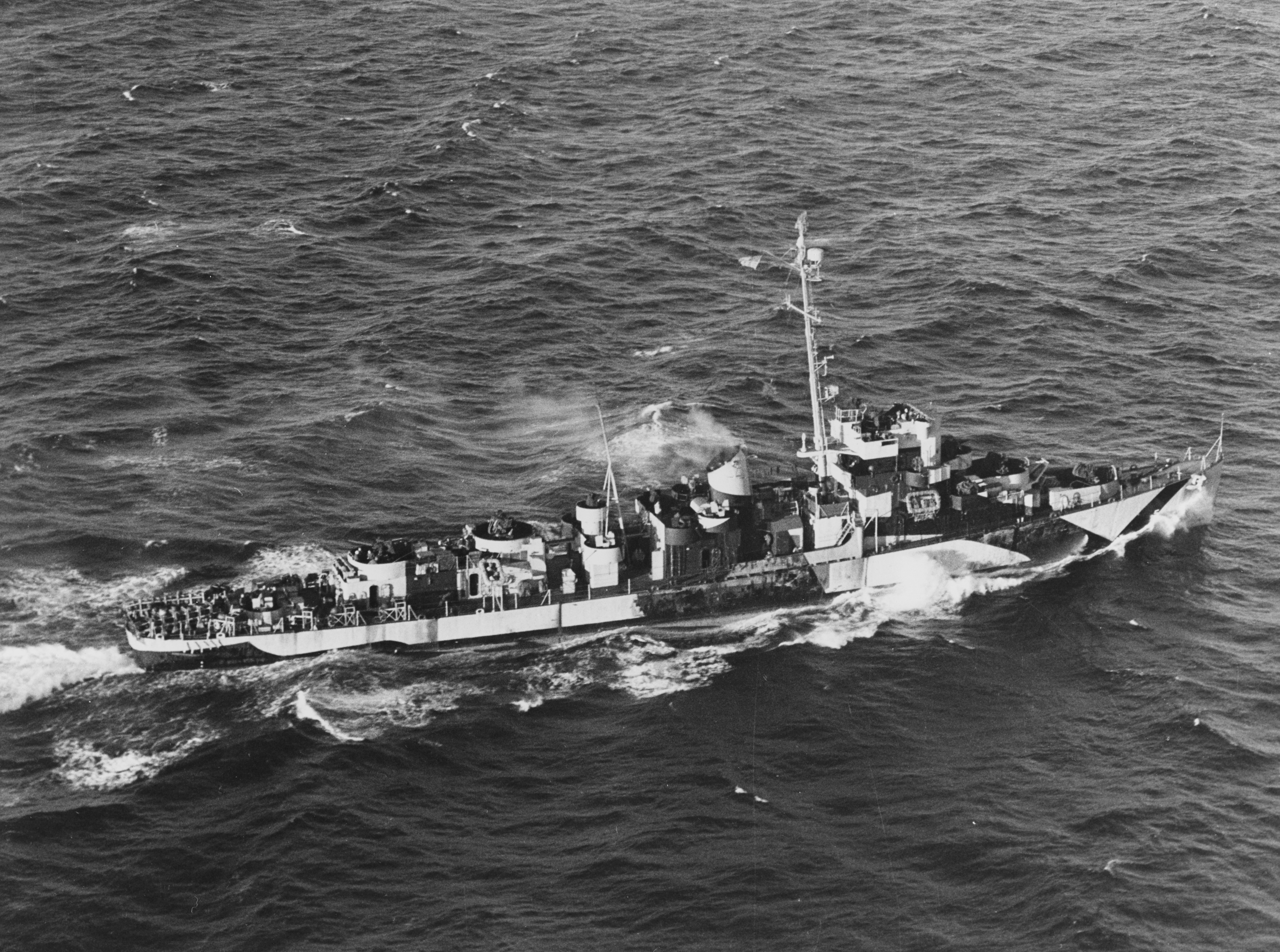
- USS Evarts in August 1944

Class overview
- Name: Evarts class
- Builders: Boston Navy Yard, MA; Mare Island Navy Yard, CA; Puget Sound Navy Yard, WA; Philadelphia Navy Yard, PA
- Operators: United States Navy; Royal Navy; Republic of China Navy
- Preceded by: N/A
- Succeeded by: Buckley class
- Planned: 105
- Completed: 97
- Cancelled: 8

General characteristics
- Type: Destroyer escort
- Displacement: 1,360 tons (fully loaded)
- Length: 289 ft 6 in (88.2 m) (overall)
- Beam: 35 ft (10.7 m)
- Draft: 9 ft (2.7 m) (fully loaded)
- Propulsion: 4 × GM Model 16-278A diesel engines with electric drive, two propellers
- Speed: 19 knots (35 km/h; 22 mph) (Many ships were capable of 21–22 knots)
- Range: 5,000 mi (4,300 nmi; 8,000 km) at 15 knots (28 km/h; 17 mph)
- Sensors & processing systems: Radar: Type SL Surface search and type SA Air search only fitted to certain ships.; Asdic (Sonar): Type 128D or Type 144 both in retractable dome.; Direction Finding: MF Direction Finding and HF/DF Type FH 4 antenna
- Armament: Main guns: 3 × 3 inch/50 guns in open mounts; Anti-aircraft guns: 7 × Oerlikon 20 mm guns; Hedgehog anti-submarine mortar; Depth Charges: Up to 160 depth charges were carried.

The Evarts-class destroyer escorts were destroyer escorts launched in the United States in 1942–44. They served in World War II as convoy escorts and anti-submarine warfare ships. They were also known as the GMT or "short hull" DE class, with GMT standing for General Motors Tandem Diesel drive.

The lead ship was USS Evarts, launched on 7 December 1942, exactly a year after the attack on Pearl Harbor. The first ship to be completed was commissioned on 20 January 1943 at the Boston Navy Yard; it was delivered to the Royal Navy under the Lend-Lease provisions and became HMS Bayntun. Evarts-class ships were driven by diesel-electric power with four diesel engines mounted in tandem with electric drives. The ships were prefabricated in sections at various factories in the United States and the units brought together in the shipyards, where they were welded together on the slipways. The original design specified eight engines for 24 knots but other priority programs forced the use of only four with a consequent shortening of the hull.

In all, 105 Evarts-class ships were ordered with eight later being cancelled. The United States Navy commissioned 65 while 32 Evarts-class ships were delivered to the Royal Navy. They were classed as frigates and named after captains of the Napoleonic Wars and formed part of the Captain class along with 46 ships of the Buckley class.

== Ships in Class ==
Construction data
Ship Name	Hull No.	Builder	Laid down	Launched	Commissioned	Decommissioned	Fate
Evarts	DE-5	Boston Navy Yard	17 October 1942	7 December 1942	5 April 1943	2 October 1945	Decommissioned at New York, sold for scrap 12 July 1946
Wyffels	DE-6	Boston Navy Yard	17 October 1942	7 December 1942	21 April 1943	28 August 1945	Decommissioned and leased to Republic of China as T'ai Kang; permanently transferred to Republic of China February 1948 and struck from NVR 12 March 1948
Griswold	DE-7	Boston Navy Yard	27 November 1942	9 January 1943	28 April 1943	19 November 1945	Struck from Navy List 5 December 1945; sold for scrap 27 November 1946
Steele	DE-8	Boston Navy Yard	27 November 1942	9 January 1943	4 May 1943	21 November 1945	Struck from Navy List 5 December 1945
Carlson	DE-9	Boston Navy Yard	27 November 1942	9 January 1943	10 May 1943	10 December 1945	Sold 17 October 1946
Bebas	DE-10	Boston Navy Yard	27 November 1942	9 January 1943	15 May 1943	18 October 1945	Struck from Navy List 1 November 1945; sold for scrap January 1947
Crouter	DE-11	Boston Navy Yard	8 February 1942	26 January 1943	25 May 1943	30 November 1945	Sold for scrapping, 25 November 1946. Broken up, 1947
Brennan (ex-HMS Bentinck)	DE-13	Mare Island Navy Yard	28 February 1942	22 August 1942	20 January 1943	9 October 1945	Struck from the Navy List 24 October 1945; sold for scrap July 1946
Doherty (ex-HMS Berry)	DE-14	Mare Island Navy Yard	28 February 1942	29 August 1942	6 February 1943	14 December 1945	Sold 26 December 1946
Austin (ex-HMS Blackwood)	DE-15	Mare Island Navy Yard	14 March 1942	25 September 1942	13 February 1943	21 December 1945	Struck from Navy List 8 January 1946; scrapping completed at Terminal Island Naval Shipyard 9 January 1947
Edgar G. Chase (ex-HMS Burges)	DE-16	Mare Island Navy Yard	14 March 1942	26 September 1942	20 March 1943	16 October 1945	Struck from Navy List 1 November 1945; sold for scrap 18 March 1947
Edward C. Daly (ex-HMS Byard)	DE-17	Mare Island Navy Yard	1 April 1942	21 October 1942	3 April 1943	20 December 1945	Struck from Navy List 1 January 1946; sold for scrap 11 November 1946
Gilmore (ex-HMS Calder)	DE-18	Mare Island Navy Yard	1 April 1942	22 October 1942	17 April 1943	29 December 1945	Sold for scrap 1 February 1947
Burden R. Hastings (ex-HMS Duckworth)	DE-19	Mare Island Navy Yard	15 April 1942	20 November 1942	1 May 1943	25 October 1945	Struck from Navy List 13 November 1945; sold for scrap 1 February 1947
Le Hardy (ex-HMS Duff)	DE-20	Mare Island Navy Yard	15 April 1942	21 November 1942	15 May 1943	25 October 1945	Sold for scrap 26 December 1946
Harold C. Thomas (ex-HMS Essington)	DE-21	Mare Island Navy Yard	30 April 1942	18 December 1942	31 May 1943	26 October 1945	Sold for scrap 25 November 1946
Wileman (ex-HMS Foley)	DE-22	Mare Island Navy Yard	30 April 1942	19 December 1942	11 June 1943	16 November 1945	Struck from Navy List 28 November 1945; sold for scrap January 1947
Charles R. Greer	DE-23	Mare Island Navy Yard	7 September 1942	18 January 1943	25 June 1943	2 November 1945	Sold 1 February 1947
Whitman	DE-24	Mare Island Navy Yard	7 September 1942	19 January 1943	3 July 1943	1 November 1945	Struck from Navy List 16 November 1945; sold for scrap 31 January 1947
Wintle	DE-25	Mare Island Navy Yard	1 October 1942	18 February 1943	10 July 1943	15 November 1945	Struck from Navy List 28 November 1945; sold for scrap 25 August 1947
Dempsey	DE-26	Mare Island Navy Yard	1 October 1942	19 February 1943	24 July 1943	22 November 1945	Sold 18 April 1947
Duffy	DE-27	Mare Island Navy Yard	29 October 1942	16 April 1943	5 August 1943	9 November 1945	Sold 16 June 1947
Emery (ex-Eisner)	DE-28	Mare Island Navy Yard	29 October 1942	17 April 1943	14 August 1943	15 November 1945	Sold 21 July 1947
Stadtfeld	DE-29	Mare Island Navy Yard	26 November 1942	17 May 1943	26 August 1943	15 November 1945	Sold for scrap July 1947
Martin	DE-30	Mare Island Navy Yard	26 November 1942	18 May 1943	4 September 1943	19 November 1945	Struck from the Navy List 5 December 1945; Sold for scrap 15 May 1946
Sederstrom (ex-Gillette)	DE-31	Mare Island Navy Yard	24 December 1942	15 June 1943	11 September 1943	15 November 1945	Struck from the Navy List 28 November 1945; sold for scrap 24 November 1947
Fleming	DE-32	Mare Island Navy Yard	24 December 1942	16 June 1943	18 September 1943	10 November 1945	Sold 29 January 1948
Tisdale	DE-33	Mare Island Navy Yard	23 January 1943	28 June 1943	11 October 1943	17 November 1945	Struck from the Navy List 28 November 1945; sold for scrap 2 February 1948
Eisele	DE-34	Mare Island Navy Yard	23 January 1943	29 June 1943	18 October 1943	16 November 1945	Sold 29 January 1948
Fair	DE-35	Mare Island Navy Yard	24 February 1943	27 July 1943	23 October 1943	17 November 1945	Transferred to the U.S. Army 20 May 1947
Manlove	DE-36	Mare Island Navy Yard	24 February 1943	28 July 1943	8 November 1943	16 November 1945	Sold for scrap 4 December 1947
Greiner	DE-37	Puget Sound Navy Yard	7 September 1942	20 May 1943	18 August 1943	19 November 1945	Struck from the Navy List 5 December 1945; sold for scrap 10 February 1946
Wyman	DE-38	Puget Sound Navy Yard	7 September 1942	3 June 1943	1 September 1943	17 December 1945	Struck from the Navy List 8 January 1946; sold for scrap 16 April 1947
Lovering	DE-39	Puget Sound Navy Yard	7 September 1942	18 June 1943	17 September 1943	16 October 1945	Struck from the Navy List 1 November 1945; sold for scrap 31 December 1946
Sanders	DE-40	Puget Sound Navy Yard	7 September 1942	18 June 1943	1 October 1943	19 December 1945	Struck from the Navy List 8 January 1946; sold for scrap 8 May 1947
Brackett	DE-41	Puget Sound Navy Yard	12 January 1943	1 August 1943	18 October 1943	23 November 1945	Struck from the Navy List 5 December 1945; sold for scrap May 1947
Reynolds	DE-42	Puget Sound Navy Yard	12 January 1943	1 August 1943	1 November 1943	5 December 1945	Struck from the Navy List 19 December 1945; sold for scrap 28 April 1947
Mitchell	DE-43	Puget Sound Navy Yard	12 January 1943	1 August 1943	7 November 1943	29 December 1945	Struck from the Navy List 29 December 1945; sold for scrap 11 December 1946
Donaldson	DE-44	Puget Sound Navy Yard	12 January 1943	1 August 1943	1 December 1943	5 December 1945	Sold 2 July 1946
Andres (ex-HMS Capel)	DE-45	Philadelphia Navy Yard	12 February 1942	24 July 1942	15 March 1943	18 October 1945	Struck from the Navy List 1 November 1945; sold for scrap February 1946
Decker	DE-47	Philadelphia Navy Yard	1 April 1942	24 July 1942	3 May 1943	28 August 1945	Decommissioned and leased to the Republic of China as Ta'i Ping; Struck from Navy List and permanently transferred to China 7 February 1948; Sunk by Communist Chinese gunboats 14 November 1954
Dobler	DE-48	Philadelphia Navy Yard	1 April 1942	24 July 1942	17 May 1943	2 October 1945	Sold for scrap 12 July 1946
Doneff	DE-49	Philadelphia Navy Yard	1 April 1942	24 July 1942	10 June 1943	22 December 1945	Struck from the Navy List 21 January 1946; sold for scrap 9 January 1947
Engstrom	DE-50	Philadelphia Navy Yard	1 April 1942	24 July 1942	21 June 1943	19 December 1945	Sold 26 December 1946
Seid	DE-256	Boston Navy Yard	10 January 1943	22 February 1943	11 June 1943	14 December 1945	Struck from the Navy List 8 January 1946; sold for scrap January 1947
Smartt	DE-257	Boston Navy Yard	10 January 1943	22 February 1943	18 June 1943	5 October 1945	Struck from the Navy List 24 October 1945; sold for scrap 12 July 1946
Walter S. Brown	DE-258	Boston Navy Yard	10 January 1943	22 February 1943	25 June 1943	4 October 1945	Struck from the Navy List 24 October 1945
William C. Miller	DE-259	Boston Navy Yard	10 January 1943	22 February 1943	2 July 1943	21 December 1945	Struck from the Navy List 8 January 1946; sold for scrap 12 April 1947
Cabana	DE-260	Boston Navy Yard	27 January 1943	10 March 1943	9 July 1943	9 January 1946	Sold 13 May 1947
Dionne	DE-261	Boston Navy Yard	27 January 1943	10 March 1943	16 July 1943	18 January 1946	Sold 12 June 1947
Canfield	DE-262	Boston Navy Yard	23 February 1943	6 April 1943	22 July 1943	21 December 1945	Sold 12 June 1947
Deede	DE-263	Boston Navy Yard	23 February 1943	6 April 1943	29 July 1943	9 January 1946	Sold 12 June 1947
Elden	DE-264	Boston Navy Yard	23 February 1943	6 April 1943	4 August 1943	18 January 1946	Sold 12 July 1947
Cloues	DE-265	Boston Navy Yard	23 February 1943	6 April 1943	10 August 1943	26 November 1945	Sold 22 May 1947
Lake	DE-301	Mare Island Navy Yard	22 April 1943	18 August 1943	5 February 1944	3 December 1945	Sold for scrap 14 December 1946
Lyman	DE-302	Mare Island Navy Yard	22 April 1943	18 August 1943	19 February 1944	5 December 1945	Sold for scrap 26 December 1946
Crowley	DE-303	Mare Island Navy Yard	24 May 1943	22 September 1943	25 March 1944	3 December 1945	Sold 21 December 1946
Rall	DE-304	Mare Island Navy Yard	24 May 1943	23 September 1943	8 April 1944	11 December 1945	Struck from the Navy List 3 January 1946; sold for scrap 18 March 1947
Halloran	DE-305	Mare Island Navy Yard	21 June 1943	14 January 1944	27 May 1944	2 November 1945	Struck from the Navy List 28 November 1945; sold for scrap 7 March 1947
Connolly	DE-306	Mare Island Navy Yard	21 June 1943	15 January 1944	8 July 1944	22 November 1945	Sold for scrap 20 May 1946
Finnegan	DE-307	Mare Island Navy Yard	5 July 1943	22 February 1944	19 August 1944	27 November 1945	Sold June 1946
O'Toole	DE-527	Boston Navy Yard	25 September 1943	2 November 1943	22 January 1944	18 October 1945	Struck from the Navy List 1 November 1945; sold for scrap March 1946
John J. Powers	DE-528	Boston Navy Yard	25 September 1943	2 November 1943	29 February 1944	16 October 1945	Scrapped February 1946
Mason	DE-529	Boston Navy Yard	14 October 1943	17 November 1943	20 March 1944	12 October 1945	Struck from the Navy List 1 November 1945; sold for scrap 18 March 1947
John M. Bermingham	DE-530	Boston Navy Yard	14 October 1943	17 November 1943	8 April 1944	12 October 1945	Scrapped March 1946

== See also ==
- List of destroyer escorts of the United States Navy
- List of frigates of the United States Navy subset of above with hull numbers DE/FF 1037 and higher plus all DEG/FFGs because of the United States Navy 1975 ship reclassification
- List of frigates
