= USS Engstrom =

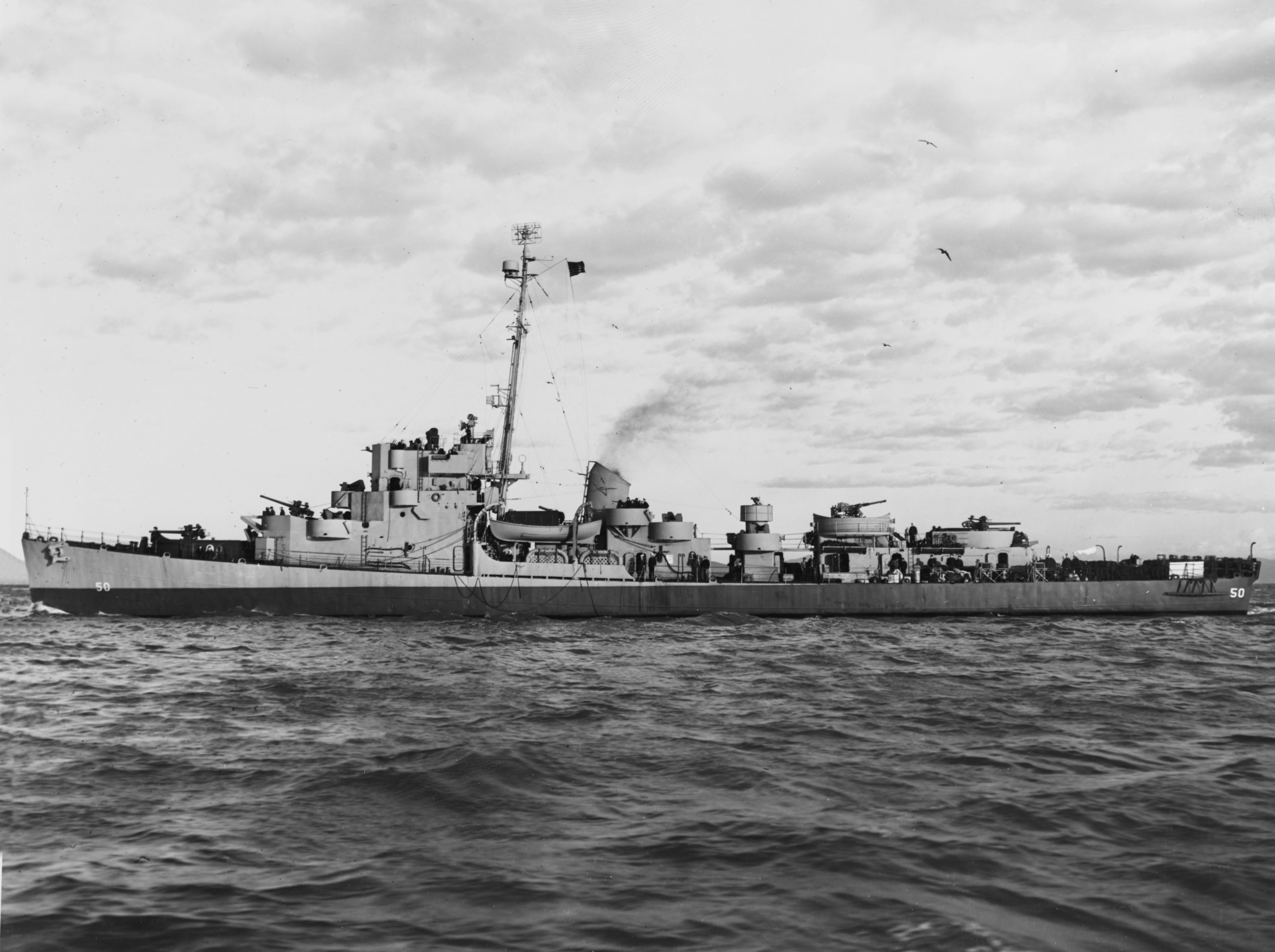
- 27 February 1945: Broadside view of Engstrom. She was under overhaul at Mare Island from 19 January until 27 February 1945.

History

United States
- Name: USS Engstrom (DE-50)
- Builder: Philadelphia Navy Yard
- Laid down: 1 April 1942
- Launched: 24 July 1942 as HMS Drury (BDE-50)
- Commissioned: 21 June 1943 as USS Engstrom (DE-50)
- Decommissioned: 19 December 1945
- Stricken: 8 January 1946
- Fate: Sold for scrap on 26 December 1946

General characteristics
- Class & type: Evarts class destroyer escort
- Displacement: 1,140 (standard), 1,430 tons (full)
- Length: 283 ft 6 in (86.41 m) (waterline), 289 ft 5 in (88.21 m) (overall))
- Beam: 35 ft 2 in (10.72 m)
- Draft: 11 ft 0 in (3.35 m) (max)
- Propulsion: 4 General Motors Model 16-278A diesel engines with electric drive; 6,000 shp; 2 screws
- Speed: 19 kn (35 km/h)
- Range: 4,150 nm
- Complement: 15 officers, 183 enlisted
- Armament: 3 × 3 in (76 mm) cal Mk 22 dual-purpose guns (1×3), 4 × 1.1"/75 caliber gun (1×4), 9 × Oerlikon 20 mm Mk 4 AA cannons, 1 × Hedgehog Projector Mk 10 (144 rounds), 8 × Mk 6 depth charge projectors, 2 × Mk 9 depth charge tracks

USS Engstrom (DE-50) was an Evarts class destroyer escort constructed for the United States Navy during World War II. She was sent off into the Pacific Ocean to protect convoys and other ships from Japanese submarines and fighter aircraft. She performed escort and antisubmarine operations in dangerous battle areas and returned home safely to the States.

== Design ==
The Evarts-class destroyer escorts were 289 ft 5 in (88.21 m) long overall, and they had a beam of 35 ft 2 in (10.72 m). They had an average draft of 10 ft 1 in (3.07 m) at their full load displacement of 1,416 long tons (1,439 t). Each ship had a normal crew numbered 156 officers and sailors.

Engstrom was propelled by a pair of diesel motors manufactured by General Motors, which drove a pair of screw propellers. Her propulsion system was rated to produce 6,000 brake horsepower (4,500 kW) for a top speed of 19.5 knots (36.1 km/h; 22.4 mph). Oil storage amounted to between 131 and 197 long tons (133 and 200 t), which allowed a cruising radius of up to 6,000 nautical miles (11,000 km; 6,900 mi) at an economical pace of 10 knots (19 km/h; 12 mph).

The ship's armament consisted of a main battery of three 3-inch (76 mm) /50-caliber guns in individual pivot mounts, which could be used against air or surface targets. These were supported by a light anti-aircraft battery that initially consisted of four 1.1 in (28 mm) /75-caliber guns in a quadruple mount and nine 20 mm (0.79 in) Oerlikon guns. For attacks against submarines, the ship was equipped with a Hedgehog mortar, eight depth charge throwers, and two depth charge racks.

== Service history ==
She was launched on 24 July 1942 by Philadelphia Navy Yard as HMS Drury (BDE-50), but was reallocated to the US Navy. She was then assigned the name Engstrom on 4 March 1943, after Warren Engstrom, who had been killed during the Battle of Tassafaronga. The ship was commissioned on 21 June 1943.

Engstrom sailed from Philadelphia, Pennsylvania, on 20 August 1943 for Norfolk, Virginia, where she joined a convoy bound for the Panama Canal Zone and San Diego, California, arriving on the west coast on 9 September. On the 27th, she got underway for Adak and over a year of duty in northern waters. Often fighting weather almost as dangerous as the enemy, she escorted combatant and auxiliary ships, acted as radar picket ship for air operations between Attu and Paramushiro, and screened surveying ships.

The escort vessel returned to Mare Island, California, on 19 January 1945 for overhaul and, after training at Pearl Harbor, sailed on convoy duty to Eniwetok and Saipan, her base from 31 March through the end of the war for escort assignments to Eniwetok, Ulithi, Guam, and Iwo Jima. The men and supplies, whose movement she guarded, saw action on Okinawa.

From 12 September-11 October 1945, Engstrom patrolled out of Guam. She reached San Pedro, Los Angeles on 24 October, and was decommissioned on 19 December 1945, being sold on 26 December 1946.

== Awards ==
- American Campaign Medal
- Asiatic–Pacific Campaign Medal
- World War II Victory Medal
