= USS Elden =

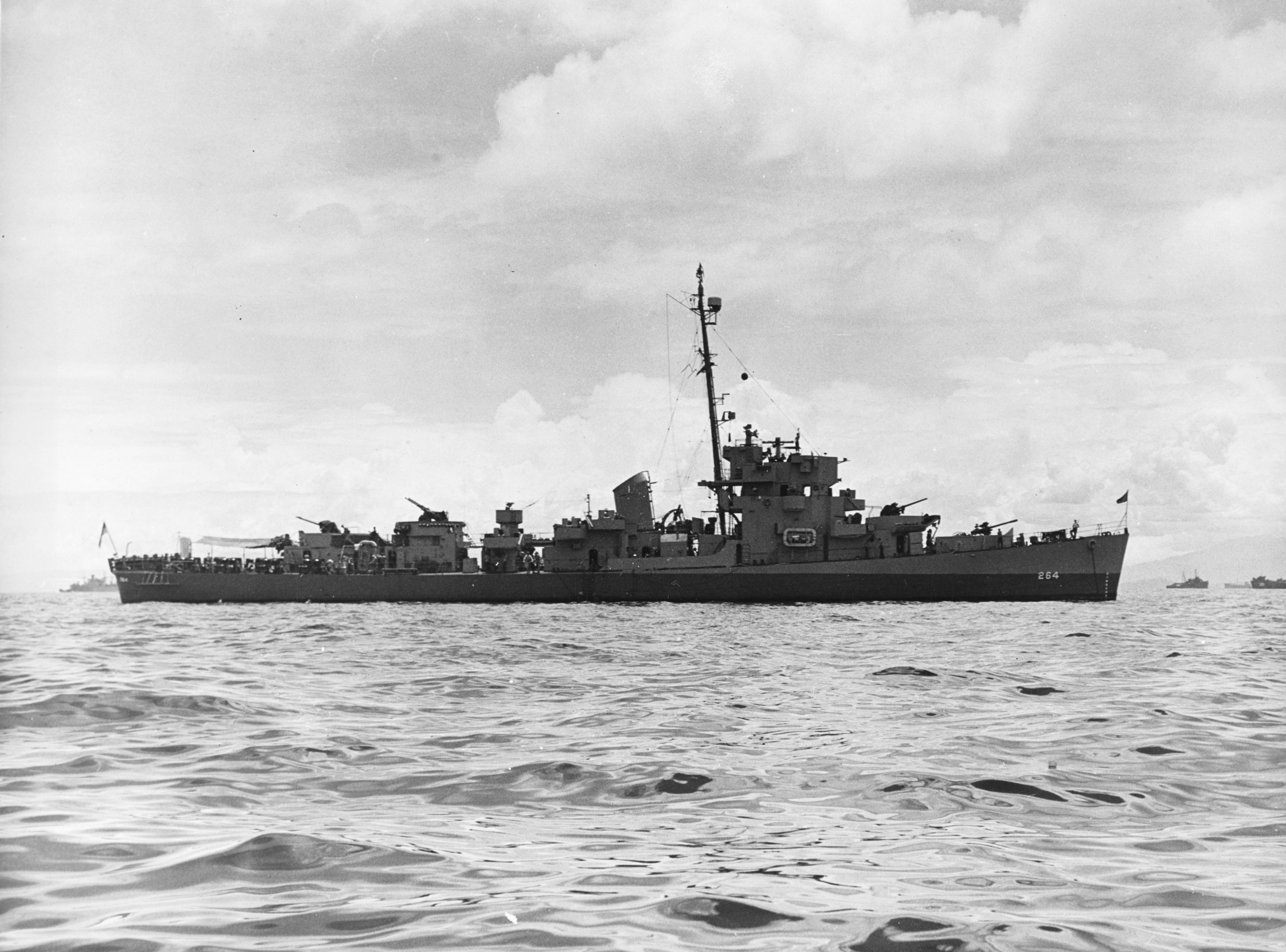
- Elden at anchor c. 1945

History

United States
- Name: USS Elden
- Builder: Boston Navy Yard
- Laid down: 23 February 1943
- Launched: 6 April 1943
- Commissioned: 4 August 1943
- Decommissioned: 18 January 1946
- Stricken: 8 January 1946
- Honors and awards: 6 battle stars (World War II)
- Fate: Sold for scrap, 12 July 1947

General characteristics
- Type: Evarts-class destroyer escort
- Displacement: 1,140 long tons (1,158 t)
- Length: 289 ft 5 in (88.21 m)
- Beam: 35 ft 1 in (10.69 m)
- Draft: 8 ft 3 in (2.51 m)
- Propulsion: 4 × General Motors Model 16-278A diesel engines with electric drive, 6,000 shp (4,474 kW); 2 screws
- Speed: 19 knots (35 km/h; 22 mph)
- Range: 6,000 nmi (11,000 km)
- Armament: 3 × single 3"/50 Mk.22 dual-purpose guns; 1 × Hedgehog projector; 8 × depth charge projectors; 2 × depth charge tracks

USS Elden (DE-264) was an Evarts-class destroyer escort in the service of the United States Navy.

Elden (DE-264) operated mainly in the Pacific Theater of Operations during World War II. Most notably, she participated in "Operation Forager" and "Operation Detachment". Elden earned six battle stars and was scrapped in 1947.

== Design ==
The Evarts-class destroyer escorts were 289 ft 5 in (88.21 m) long overall, and they had a beam of 35 ft 2 in (10.72 m). They had an average draft of 10 ft 1 in (3.07 m) at their full load displacement of 1,416 long tons (1,439 t). Each ship had a normal crew numbered 156 officers and sailors.

Elden was propelled by a pair of diesel motors manufactured by General Motors, which drove a pair of screw propellers. Her propulsion system was rated to produce 6,000 brake horsepower (4,500 kW) for a top speed of 19.5 knots (36.1 km/h; 22.4 mph). Oil storage amounted to between 131 and 197 long tons (133 and 200 t), which allowed a cruising radius of up to 6,000 nautical miles (11,000 km; 6,900 mi) at an economical pace of 10 knots (19 km/h; 12 mph).

The ship's armament consisted of a main battery of three 3-inch (76 mm) /50-caliber guns in individual pivot mounts, which could be used against air or surface targets. These were supported by a light anti-aircraft battery that initially consisted of four 1.1 in (28 mm) /75-caliber guns in a quadruple mount and nine 20 mm (0.79 in) Oerlikon guns. For attacks against submarines, the ship was equipped with a Hedgehog mortar, eight depth charge throwers, and two depth charge racks.

== Service history ==
Elden (DE-264) was named for Ralph Elden. a naval officer killed during the Battle of Midway on 6 June 1942. The new destroyer escort was launched on 6 April 1943 by Boston Naval Shipyard, Charlestown, Massachusetts; sponsored by Mrs. Margaret Newton Elden, widow of the ship's namesake. Elden was commissioned on 4 August 1943.

Sailing from Norfolk on 13 October 1943 for duty with the Pacific Fleet, Elden arrived at Pearl Harbor on 17 November. She trained in anti-submarine and amphibious landing exercises and three times screened oilers to rendezvous with the 5th Fleet, the third time during the occupation of Kwajalein and Majuro in the Marshalls. She departed Pearl Harbor on 30 March 1944 to join a hunter-killer task group on patrol in the eastern Marshalls.

Elden departed Pearl Harbor again on 1 June 1944 with a convoy for Eniwetok, then saw action in the capture and occupation of the Marianas. She patrolled off Tinian to prevent enemy troops from landing behind American lines on Saipan. Her guns sank several barges the night of 25–26 June. After anti-submarine patrol off Eniwetok in early July, she returned to screening transports at Saipan, and deliver harassing fire on Tinian. During the invasion of Guam, she escorted convoys from Eniwetok.

Elden operated out of Manus from 26 August 1944, screening oilers to refueling rendezvous with ships invading the Palaus and Leyte. She returned to Pearl Harbor on 16 November for overhaul and remained there for amphibious and anti-submarine training. She escorted two convoys to Eniwetok in January and February 1945, then arrived off Iwo Jima on 7 March to patrol the transport area until 20 March. She returned to the west coast for overhaul, then operated from Ulithi from 21 July as escort for oilers refueling fleet units executing the final massive raids on Japan. Elden served in the Far East on occupation duty, then returned to San Francisco on 25 November. She was decommissioned at Mare Island Navy Yard on 18 January 1946, and sold on 12 July 1947.
