= USS Cabana =

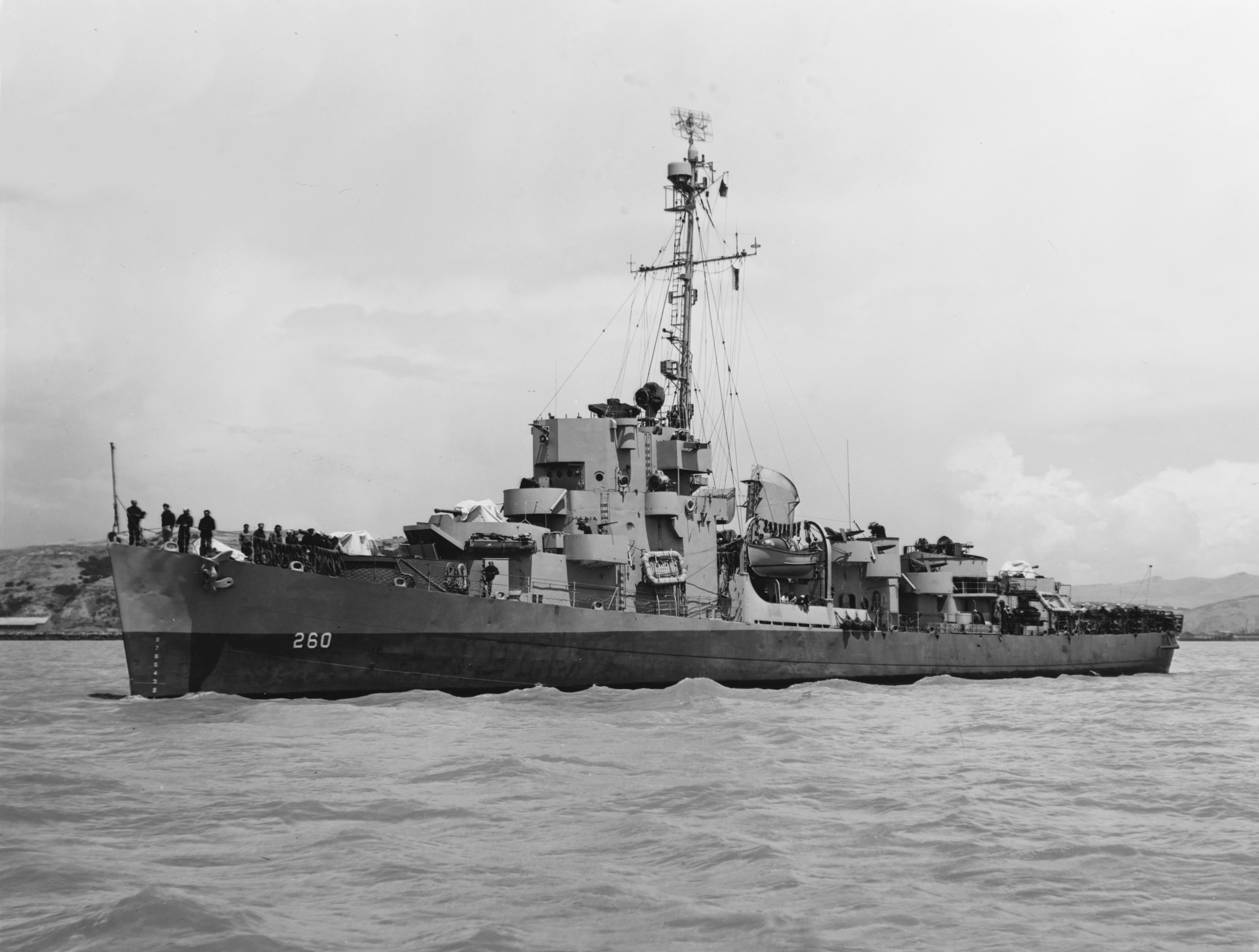
- Cabana on 18 May 1945

History

United States
- Name: USS Cabana
- Builder: Boston Navy Yard
- Laid down: 27 January 1943
- Launched: 10 March 1943
- Commissioned: 9 July 1943
- Decommissioned: 6 January 1946
- Stricken: 21 January 1946
- Honors and awards: 7 battle stars (World War II)
- Fate: Sold for scrapping, 13 May 1947

General characteristics
- Type: Evarts-class destroyer escort
- Displacement: 1,140 long tons (1,158 t) standard; 1,430 long tons (1,453 t) full
- Length: 289 ft 5 in (88.21 m) o/a; 283 ft 6 in (86.41 m) w/l
- Beam: 35 ft 2 in (10.72 m)
- Draft: 11 ft (3.4 m) (max)
- Propulsion: 4 × General Motors Model 16-278A diesel engines with electric drive, 6,000 shp (4,474 kW); 2 screws
- Speed: 19 knots (35 km/h; 22 mph)
- Range: 4,150 nmi (7,690 km)
- Complement: 15 officers and 183 enlisted
- Armament: 3 × single 3"/50 Mk.22 dual-purpose guns; 1 × quad 1.1"/75 Mk.2 AA gun; 9 × 20 mm Mk.4 AA guns; 1 × Hedgehog Projector Mk.10 (144 rounds); 8 × Mk.6 depth charge projectors; 2 × Mk.9 depth charge tracks

USS Cabana (DE-260) was an Evarts-class destroyer escort constructed for the United States Navy during World War II. The namesake of this ship, Napoleon Joseph Cabana, was born in Fairhaven, Massachusetts on 26 March 1911, Cabana enlisted in the Navy on 17 March 1930 and was appointed machinist on 2 February 1941. As assistant safety engineer of the Cavite Navy Yard, Philippines, he was killed in action during Japanese attacks on that base on 12 December 1941.

== Design ==
The Evarts-class destroyer escorts were 289 ft 5 in (88.21 m) long overall, and they had a beam of 35 ft 2 in (10.72 m). They had an average draft of 10 ft 1 in (3.07 m) at their full load displacement of 1,416 long tons (1,439 t). Each ship had a normal crew numbered 156 officers and sailors.

Cabana was propelled by a pair of diesel motors manufactured by General Motors, which drove a pair of screw propellers. Her propulsion system was rated to produce 6,000 brake horsepower (4,500 kW) for a top speed of 19.5 knots (36.1 km/h; 22.4 mph). Oil storage amounted to between 131 and 197 long tons (133 and 200 t), which allowed a cruising radius of up to 6,000 nautical miles (11,000 km; 6,900 mi) at an economical pace of 10 knots (19 km/h; 12 mph).

The ship's armament consisted of a main battery of three 3-inch (76 mm) /50-caliber guns in individual pivot mounts, which could be used against air or surface targets. These were supported by a light anti-aircraft battery that initially consisted of four 1.1 in (28 mm) /75-caliber guns in a quadruple mount and nine 20 mm (0.79 in) Oerlikon guns. For attacks against submarines, the ship was equipped with a Hedgehog mortar, eight depth charge throwers, and two depth charge racks.

== Service history ==
Cabana was launched on 10 March 1943 by Boston Navy Yard; sponsored by Mrs. E. Cabana; and commissioned on 9 July 1943. USS Cabana was sent off into the Pacific Ocean to protect convoys and other ships from Japanese submarines and aircraft. She performed escort and antisubmarine operations in dangerous battle areas and returned home with seven battle stars, a very high number for a ship of her type.

Clearing Norfolk, Virginia, on 2 October 1943, Cabana arrived at Pearl Harbor on 26 October. From this base she screened the tanker units supporting Task Force 53 in its strikes in the Ellice and Gilbert Islands during the invasion of the latter. After a convoy escort voyage to San Francisco, she cleared Pearl Harbor on 28 January 1944 to guard vulnerable transports bound for the occupation of Kwajalein. Cabana returned to Pearl Harbor on 15 February to join the screen of tankers destined for the essential task of refueling ships engaged in the continuing operations in the Marshall Islands.

Displaying her anti-submarine capabilities, Cabana patrolled with a hunter-killer group from Majuro through March and April 1944, then returned to Pearl Harbor to prepare for the Marianas operation. Through the summer she offered fire support, radar picket, and escort services as Saipan, Guam, and Tinian were added to the growing list of American victories. On 18 September she arrived at Guadalcanal to escort invasion forces to the southern Palau Islands, then continued convoy voyages to Ulithi and Peleliu as the Palaus operation came to its close. Cabana returned to Pearl Harbor 21 November for training, and on 11 February 1945 sailed guarding transports to provide reinforcements for the invasion of Iwo Jima. She patrolled off that island from 7 to 20 March, then returned to the United States for a brief overhaul.

Cabana rejoined United States Third Fleet units operating from Ulithi and Guam on 17 July 1945, and until the close of the war screened the logistics support group. On 20 September she entered Tokyo Bay escorting tankers to refuel the occupation fleet, and after a month of service as weather station ship off Pearl Harbor, returned to Mare Island, California, on 25 November 1945. Cabana was decommissioned on 9 January 1946 and sold on 13 May 1947.

== Awards ==
Cabana received seven battle stars for World War II service.
