= USS Connolly =

History

United States
- Name: USS Connolly
- Builder: Mare Island Navy Yard
- Laid down: 21 June 1943
- Launched: 15 January 1944
- Commissioned: 8 July 1944
- Decommissioned: 22 November 1945
- Stricken: 19 December 1945
- Honors and awards: 2 battle stars (World War II)
- Fate: Sold for scrapping, 20 May 1946

General characteristics
- Type: Evarts-class destroyer escort
- Displacement: 1,140 long tons (1,158 t) standard; 1,430 long tons (1,453 t) full
- Length: 289 ft 5 in (88.21 m) o/a; 283 ft 6 in (86.41 m) w/l
- Beam: 35 ft 2 in (10.72 m)
- Draft: 11 ft (3.4 m) (max)
- Propulsion: 4 × General Motors Model 16-278A diesel engines with electric drive, 6,000 shp (4,474 kW); 2 screws
- Speed: 19 knots (35 km/h; 22 mph)
- Range: 4,150 nmi (7,690 km)
- Complement: 15 officers and 183 enlisted
- Armament: 3 × single 3"/50 Mk.22 dual purpose guns; 1 × quad 1.1"/75 Mk.2 AA gun; 9 × 20 mm Mk.4 AA guns; 1 × Hedgehog Projector Mk.10 (144 rounds); 8 × Mk.6 depth charge projectors; 2 × Mk.9 depth charge tracks

USS Connolly (DE-306) was an Evarts-class destroyer escort of the United States Navy during World War II. She was sent off into the Pacific Ocean to protect convoys and other ships from Japanese submarines and fighter aircraft. She performed escort and antisubmarine operations in dangerous battle areas and returned home with two battle stars.

== Design ==
The Evarts-class destroyer escorts were 289 ft 5 in (88.21 m) long overall, and they had a beam of 35 ft 2 in (10.72 m). They had an average draft of 10 ft 1 in (3.07 m) at their full load displacement of 1,416 long tons (1,439 t). Each ship had a normal crew numbered 156 officers and sailors.

Connolly was propelled by a pair of diesel motors manufactured by General Motors, which drove a pair of screw propellers. Her propulsion system was rated to produce 6,000 brake horsepower (4,500 kW) for a top speed of 19.5 knots (36.1 km/h; 22.4 mph). Oil storage amounted to between 131 and 197 long tons (133 and 200 t), which allowed a cruising radius of up to 6,000 nautical miles (11,000 km; 6,900 mi) at an economical pace of 10 knots (19 km/h; 12 mph).

The ship's armament consisted of a main battery of three 3-inch (76 mm) /50-caliber guns in individual pivot mounts, which could be used against air or surface targets. These were supported by a light anti-aircraft battery that initially consisted of four 1.1 in (28 mm) /75-caliber guns in a quadruple mount and nine 20 mm (0.79 in) Oerlikon guns. For attacks against submarines, the ship was equipped with a Hedgehog mortar, eight depth charge throwers, and two depth charge racks.

== Service history ==
Connolly was named for John Connolly, who had been killed aboard USS Oklahoma during the attack on Pearl Harbor. The ship was launched on 15 January 1944 by Mare Island Navy Yard; sponsored by Mrs. Mary Francis Connolly, commissioned on 8 July 1944 and reported to the Pacific Fleet.

Connolly operated in Hawaiian waters on training from 24 September 1944 until 22 January 1945, when she sailed for duty in the Iwo Jima operation from 19 February until 1 March. She patrolled off the island to protect shipping and providing direct support to the landings. After screening transports to Espiritu Santo, Connolly guarded the convoy to Okinawa, arriving off the Hagushi beaches on 9 April. She served on antisubmarine patrol until sailing for repairs at Ulithi on 4 May.

Connolly arrived off Okinawa again in the screen of a resupply convoy on 6 June 1945, then joined the screen of amphibious ships carrying out subsidiary landings in the Nansei Shoto until she reported in Leyte Gulf on 14 July to join the forces of the Philippine Sea Frontier. Between 17 July and 12 August, she voyaged to Okinawa on escort duty, then operated in the Philippines until 7 September, when she cleared Manila for Eniwetok, Pearl Harbor, San Pedro, Los Angeles, and Charleston, South Carolina. She arrived in Charleston on 2 November, where she was decommissioned on 22 November 1945 and sold for scrapping on 20 May 1946.

== Awards ==
Connolly received two battle stars for World War II service.
