= USS Emery =

Evarts-class destroyer escort

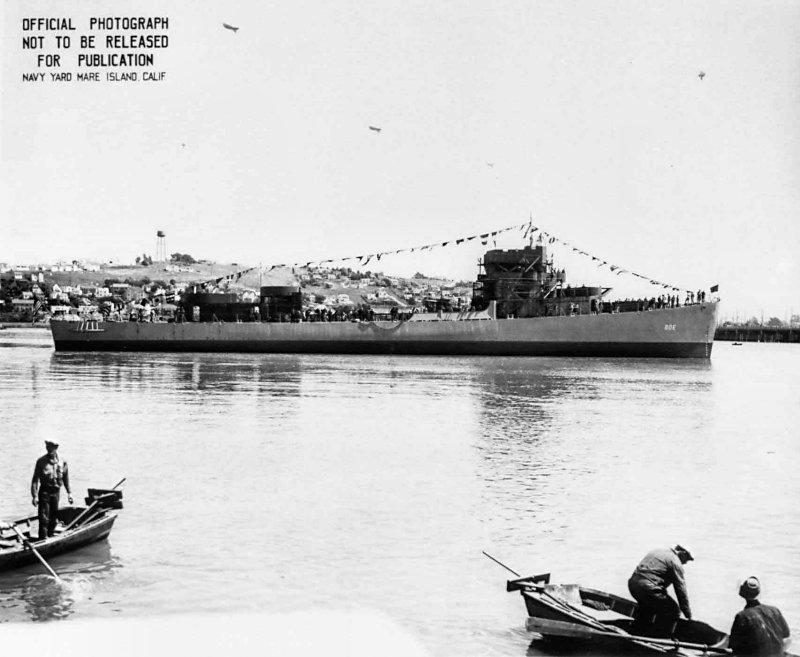

History

United States
- Name: USS Emery (DE-28)
- Builder: Mare Island Navy Yard
- Laid down: 29 October 1942
- Launched: 17 April 1943 as HMS Eisner (BDE-28)
- Commissioned: 14 August 1943 as USS Emery (DE-28)
- Decommissioned: 15 November 1945
- Stricken: 28 November 1945
- Fate: Sold for scrap on 27 July 1947

General characteristics
- Class & type: Evarts-class destroyer escort
- Displacement: 1,140 (standard), 1,430 tons (full)
- Length: 283 ft 6 in (86.41 m) (waterline), 289 ft 5 in (88.21 m) (overall))
- Beam: 35 ft 2 in (10.72 m)
- Draft: 11 ft 0 in (3.35 m) (max)
- Propulsion: 4 General Motors Model 16-278A diesel engines with electric drive; 6,000 shp; 2 screws
- Speed: 19 kn (35 km/h)
- Range: 4,150 nmi (7,690 km; 4,780 mi)
- Complement: 15 officers, 183 enlisted
- Armament: 3 × 3 in (76 mm) cal Mk 22 dual purpose guns (1×3), 4 × 1.1"/75 caliber gun (1×4), 9 × Oerlikon 20 mm Mk 4 AA cannons, 1 × Hedgehog Projector Mk 10 (144 rounds), 8 × Mk 6 depth charge projectors, 2 × Mk 9 depth charge tracks

USS Emery (DE-28) was an Evarts-class destroyer escort constructed for the United States Navy during World War II. It was promptly sent off into the Pacific Ocean to protect convoys and other ships from Japanese submarines and fighter aircraft. By the end of the war, she had accumulated three battle stars.

== Design ==
The Evarts-class destroyer escorts were 289 ft 5 in (88.21 m) long overall, and they had a beam of 35 ft 2 in (10.72 m). They had an average draft of 10 ft 1 in (3.07 m) at their full load displacement of 1,416 long tons (1,439 t). Each ship had a normal crew numbered 156 officers and sailors.

Emery was propelled by a pair of diesel motors manufactured by General Motors, which drove a pair of screw propellers. Her propulsion system was rated to produce 6,000 brake horsepower (4,500 kW) for a top speed of 19.5 knots (36.1 km/h; 22.4 mph). Oil storage amounted to between 131 and 197 long tons (133 and 200 t), which allowed a cruising radius of up to 6,000 nautical miles (11,000 km; 6,900 mi) at an economical pace of 10 knots (19 km/h; 12 mph).

The ship's armament consisted of a main battery of three 3-inch (76 mm) /50-caliber guns in individual pivot mounts, which could be used against air or surface targets. These were supported by a light anti-aircraft battery that initially consisted of four 1.1 in (28 mm) /75-caliber guns in a quadruple mount and nine 20 mm (0.79 in) Oerlikon guns. For attacks against submarines, the ship was equipped with a Hedgehog mortar, eight depth charge throwers, and two depth charge racks.

== Construction and commissioning ==
She was launched on 17 April 1943 by Mare Island Navy Yard as BDE-28 for the British Royal Navy. She was instead reallocated to the United States and assigned the name Eisner on 14 June 1943 before being renamed Emery on 14 July 1943; the ship's namesake was Jack Emery, who had been killed aboard USS Arizona during the attack on Pearl Harbor. Emery was commissioned on 14 August 1943.

== Service history ==
Emery cleared Pearl Harbor on 1 November 1943 for Funafuti and a month of local escort duty in preparation for the invasion of the Gilbert Islands, during which she screened vulnerable tankers fueling assault ships and their covering force of major combatants. She returned to Pearl Harbor on 16 December for training, and on 16 January 1944 put to sea to protect tankers again during the assault on the Marshall Islands, after which she escorted convoys between Majuro and Funafuti until 9 March.

From March–September, Emery sailed out of Port Purvis on Florida Island in the Solomons, escorting combatants, auxiliaries, and merchantmen to Emirau, Green Island, Bougainville Island, and other southwest Pacific ports. She arrived at Manus Island on 27 September, and after screening a small convoy to the Russell Islands, proceeded to Peleliu for antisubmarine patrol and an escort voyage to Ulithi. She returned to Ulithi for brief overhaul in November, then swung back through the Marshall and Mariana Islands on convoy duty, arriving at Eniwetok on 4 March. This was her base through July 1945 as she carried out escort missions to Guam, Saipan, Ulithi, Iwo Jima, and Kwajalein. Thus, she guarded the movement of men and supplies essential to the seaborne advance on Japan.

On 5 July, she sailed for San Francisco, California, where she was decommissioned on 15 November 1945, and sold from scrap on 21 July 1947.

== Awards ==
- American Campaign Medal
- Asiatic-Pacific Campaign Medal (with four service stars)
- World War II Victory Medal
