= USS Edward C. Daly =

Destroyer escort in the service of the United States Navy

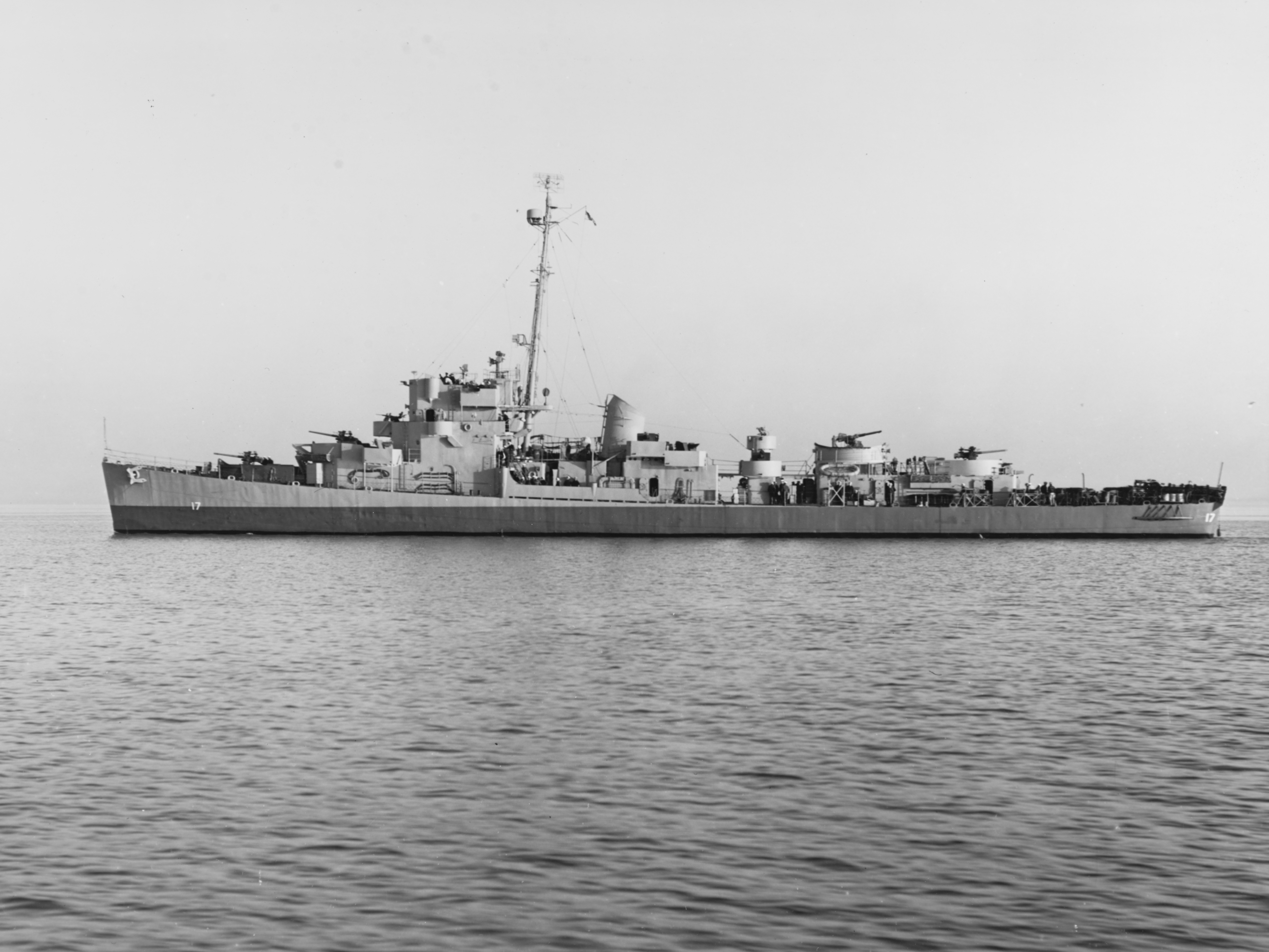
- USS Edward C. Daly on 26 February 1945

History

United States
- Name: USS Edward C. Daly (DE-17)
- Builder: Mare Island Navy Yard
- Laid down: 1 April 1942
- Launched: 21 October 1942 as HMS Byard (BDE-17)
- Commissioned: 3 April 1943 as USS Edward C. Daly (DE-17)
- Decommissioned: 20 December 1945
- Stricken: 8 January 1946
- Fate: Sold for scrap on 18 March 1947

General characteristics
- Class & type: Evarts class destroyer escort
- Displacement: 1,140 (standard), 1,430 tons (full)
- Length: 283 ft 6 in (86.41 m) (waterline), 289 ft 5 in (88.21 m) (overall))
- Beam: 35 ft 2 in (10.72 m)
- Draft: 11 ft 0 in (3.35 m) (max)
- Propulsion: 4 General Motors Model 16-278A diesel engines with electric drive; 6,000 shp; 2 screws
- Speed: 21 kn (39 km/h)
- Range: 4,150 nm
- Complement: 15 officers, 183 enlisted
- Armament: 3 × 3 in (76 mm) cal Mk 22 dual purpose guns (1×3), 4 × 1.1"/75 caliber gun (1×4), 9 × Oerlikon 20 mm Mk 4 AA cannons, 1 × Hedgehog Projector Mk 10 (144 rounds), 8 × Mk 6 depth charge projectors, 2 × Mk 9 depth charge tracks

USS Edward C. Daly (DE-17) was an Evarts-class "short-hull" destroyer escort in the service of the United States Navy.

== Design ==
The Evarts-class destroyer escorts were 289 ft 5 in (88.21 m) long overall, and they had a beam of 35 ft 2 in (10.72 m). They had an average draft of 10 ft 1 in (3.07 m) at their full load displacement of 1,416 long tons (1,439 t). Each ship had a normal crew numbered 156 officers and sailors.

Edward C. Daly was propelled by a pair of diesel motors manufactured by General Motors, which drove a pair of screw propellers. Her propulsion system was rated to produce 6,000 brake horsepower (4,500 kW) for a top speed of 19.5 knots (36.1 km/h; 22.4 mph). Oil storage amounted to between 131 and 197 long tons (133 and 200 t), which allowed a cruising radius of up to 6,000 nautical miles (11,000 km; 6,900 mi) at an economical pace of 10 knots (19 km/h; 12 mph).

The ship's armament consisted of a main battery of three 3-inch (76 mm) /50-caliber guns in individual pivot mounts, which could be used against air or surface targets. These were supported by a light anti-aircraft battery that initially consisted of four 1.1 in (28 mm) /75-caliber guns in a quadruple mount and nine 20 mm (0.79 in) Oerlikon guns. For attacks against submarines, the ship was equipped with a Hedgehog mortar, eight depth charge throwers, and two depth charge racks.

== Construction and commissioning ==
The ship was launched on 21 October 1942 by Mare Island Navy Yard, Solano County, California as HMS Byard (BDE-17); sponsored for British Lend-Lease by the wife of Lieutenant John H. McQuilkin. The ship was retained by the USN and assigned the name Edward C. Daly on 19 February 1943, after Edward Daly, a sailor killed during the attack on Pearl Harbor on 7 December 1941. The ship was commissioned on 3 April 1943.

== Service history ==
Edward C. Daly sailed from San Diego, California on 22 May 1943 and arrived at Pearl Harbor on 28 May. As the first escort vessel to visit this base, she aroused much interest and was visited by Admirals Chester W. Nimitz and Raymond A. Spruance. She escorted convoys between Pearl Harbor and the west coast. In August, she went to Funafuti to occupy other parts of the Ellice Islands and succeeded against slight opposition.

While fueling at Samoa early in October, she rescued the crew of a downed patrol bomber in heavy seas, destroyed the plane, and buried the pilot at sea.

Edward C. Daly returned to San Francisco for repairs and got underway for Alaskan waters on 27 November. Here she was assigned to the demanding, essential duty as guard and weather ship for planes flying the great circle route from Attu to Paramushiro.

She returned to San Francisco on 19 January 1945 for overhaul, then headed for Saipan, escorting Ranee as far as Guam. She was active in air-sea rescue between Iwo Jima and Saipan, continuing this patrol after the war for planes supporting the occupation of Japan.

On 19 October 1945, Edward C. Daly returned to the United States, was decommissioned at San Pedro, Los Angeles on 20 December 1945, and sold on 8 January 1947.

== Awards ==
- American Campaign Medal
- Asiatic-Pacific Campaign Medal
- World War II Victory Medal
