= USS Stadtfeld =

Evarts-class destroyer escort

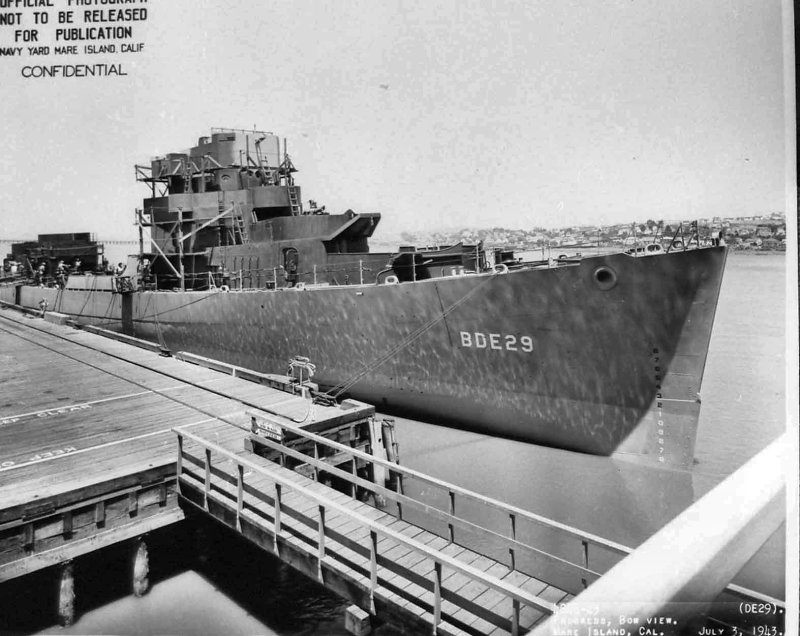
- Stadtfeld on 3 July 1943

History

United States
- Name: USS Stadtfeld
- Builder: Mare Island Navy Yard
- Laid down: 26 November 1942
- Launched: 17 May 1943
- Commissioned: 26 August 1943
- Decommissioned: 10 November 1945
- Stricken: 28 November 1945
- Honors and awards: 4 battle stars (World War II)
- Fate: Sold for scrapping, 22 July 1947

General characteristics
- Type: Evarts-class destroyer escort
- Displacement: 1,140 long tons (1,158 t) standard; 1,430 long tons (1,453 t) full
- Length: 289 ft 5 in (88.21 m) o/a; 283 ft 6 in (86.41 m) w/l
- Beam: 35 ft (11 m)
- Draft: 11 ft (3.4 m) (max)
- Propulsion: 4 × General Motors Model 16-278A diesel engines with electric drive, 6,000 shp (4,474 kW); 2 screws
- Speed: 19 knots (35 km/h; 22 mph)
- Range: 4,150 nmi (7,690 km)
- Complement: 15 officers and 183 enlisted
- Armament: 3 × single 3"/50 Mk.22 dual-purpose guns; 1 × quad 1.1"/75 Mk.2 AA gun; 9 × 20 mm Mk.4 AA guns; 1 × Hedgehog Projector Mk.10 (144 rounds); 8 × Mk.6 depth charge projectors; 2 × Mk.9 depth charge tracks

USS Stadtfeld (DE-29) was an Evarts-class destroyer escort constructed for the United States Navy during World War II. It was promptly sent off into the Pacific Ocean to protect convoys and other ships from Japanese submarines and fighter aircraft. By the end of the war, when she returned to the United States, she was awarded four battle stars.

== Design ==
The Evarts-class destroyer escorts were 289 ft 5 in (88.21 m) long overall, and they had a beam of 35 ft 2 in (10.72 m). They had an average draft of 10 ft 1 in (3.07 m) at their full load displacement of 1,416 long tons (1,439 t). Each ship had a normal crew numbered 156 officers and sailors.

Stadtfeld was propelled by a pair of diesel motors manufactured by General Motors, which drove a pair of screw propellers. Her propulsion system was rated to produce 6,000 brake horsepower (4,500 kW) for a top speed of 19.5 knots (36.1 km/h; 22.4 mph). Oil storage amounted to between 131 and 197 long tons (133 and 200 t), which allowed a cruising radius of up to 6,000 nautical miles (11,000 km; 6,900 mi) at an economical pace of 10 knots (19 km/h; 12 mph).

The ship's armament consisted of a main battery of three 3-inch (76 mm) /50-caliber guns in individual pivot mounts, which could be used against air or surface targets. These were supported by a light anti-aircraft battery that initially consisted of four 1.1 in (28 mm) /75-caliber guns in a quadruple mount and nine 20 mm (0.79 in) Oerlikon guns. For attacks against submarines, the ship was equipped with a Hedgehog mortar, eight depth charge throwers, and two depth charge racks.

== Service history ==
She was laid down for the United Kingdom under the designation BDE-29 on 26 November 1942 by the Mare Island Navy Yard, Vallejo, California; and was launched on 17 May 1943. Her assignment to the Royal Navy was cancelled and the destroyer escort was redesignated DE-29 on 16 June 1943. The ship was renamed Stadtfeld after Sanford Statdfeld, who was killed at the Battle of Tassafaronga on 30 November 1942. She was commissioned in the United States Navy on 26 August 1943.

After her shakedown and yard availability period, the ship sailed on 31 October for Hawaii and arrived at Pearl Harbor on 10 November. She then screened fueling units from there to Funafuti, Ellice Islands, and to Espiritu Santo, New Hebrides Islands. After escorting fueling units for the Gilbert Islands Operation, she departed Funafuti for Tarawa on 18 December 1943 and, five days later, was rerouted to Pearl Harbor.

Stadtfeld sortied, on 16 January 1944, as a screening unit of Task Unit 58.2.1 to participate in the conquest of the Marshall Islands and operated out of Majuro until sailing for Hawaii on 12 February. On 2 March, the ship departed Pearl Harbor en route to Funafuti, but was rerouted to Guadalcanal. Escort duty between the Solomon Islands and the Admiralty, Russell, and New Hebrides Islands followed until 1 May, including voyages to Emirau on 30 March and Green Island on 13 April. After a short tender availability period at Espiritu Santo, the destroyer escort resumed escort duty in the Solomons.

Stadtfeld was routed to Manus on 22 September 1944. In October, she was ordered to the Palau Islands and operated there until mid-November when she sailed for Guam. She escorted convoys from there to Kossol Roads, Manus, and Eniwetok. On 12 February 1945, Stadtfeld was assigned duty as an escort for a convoy from Eniwetok to Iwo Jima. She arrived at Iwo Jima on 13 March and returned to Eniwetok via Saipan. The ship then performed escort duty between the Marshall and Caroline islands until 6 July when she was ordered back to Pearl Harbor. From Hawaii, she was routed on to Mare Island, California, for overhaul.

Yard availability began on 20 July; but, after the termination of hostilities with Japan, all work was stopped on 16 August. Stadtfeld was decommissioned at Mare Island on 15 November 1945 and was struck from the Navy List on 28 November. She was sold for scrap in July 1947.

== Awards ==
- Combat Action Ribbon (retroactive)
- American Campaign Medal
- Asiatic–Pacific Campaign Medal (with four service stars)
- World War II Victory Medal
