= USS Dobler =

Evarts-class destroyer escort

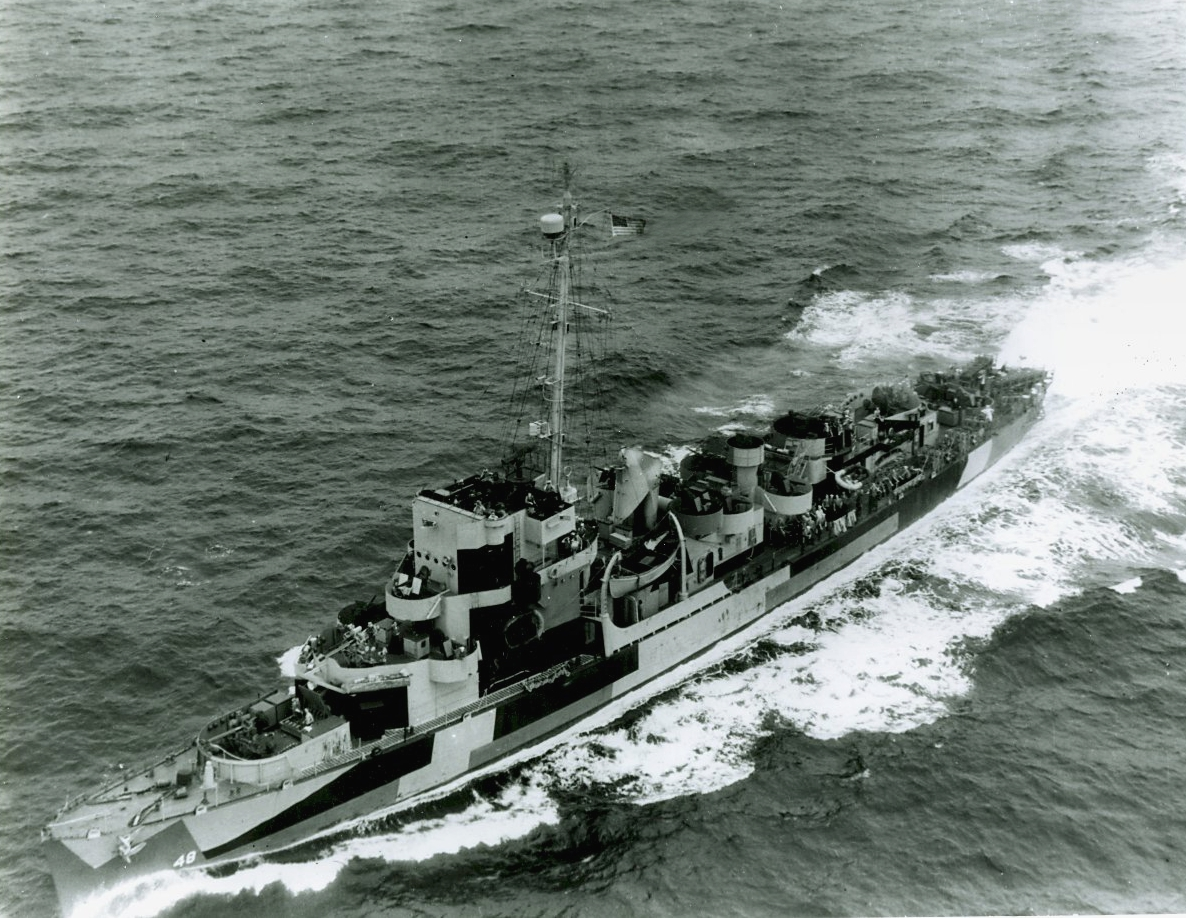
- Dobler underway on 9 September 1944

History

United States
- Name: USS Dobler (DE-48)
- Builder: Philadelphia Navy Yard
- Laid down: 1 April 1942
- Launched: 24 July 1942 as BDE-48
- Commissioned: 17 May 1943 as USS Dobler (DE-48)
- Decommissioned: 2 October 1945
- Stricken: 24 October 1945
- Fate: Sold for scrap on 12 July 1946

General characteristics
- Class & type: Evarts class destroyer escort
- Displacement: 1,140 (standard), 1,430 tons (full)
- Length: 283 ft 6 in (86.41 m) (waterline), 289 ft 5 in (88.21 m) (overall))
- Beam: 35 ft 2 in (10.72 m)
- Draft: 11 ft 0 in (3.35 m) (max)
- Propulsion: 4 General Motors Model 16-278A diesel engines with electric drive; 6000 shp; 2 screws
- Speed: 19 kn (35 km/h)
- Range: 4,150 nm
- Complement: 15 officers, 183 enlisted
- Armament: 3 × 3 in (76 mm) cal Mk 22 (1×3), 4 × 1.1"/75 caliber gun(1×4), 9 × Oerlikon 20 mm Mk 4 AA cannons, 1 × Hedgehog Projector Mk 10 (144 rounds), 8 × Mk 6 depth charge projectors, 2 × Mk 9 depth charge tracks

USS Dobler (DE-48) was an Evarts class destroyer escort constructed for the United States Navy during World War II. She was sent off into dangerous North Atlantic Ocean waters to protect convoys and other ships from German submarines and fighter aircraft. She performed escort and antisubmarine operations in battle areas before sailing home victorious at the end of the conflict.

== Design ==
The Evarts-class destroyer escorts were 289 ft 5 in (88.21 m) long overall, and they had a beam of 35 ft 2 in (10.72 m). They had an average draft of 10 ft 1 in (3.07 m) at their full load displacement of 1,416 long tons (1,439 t). Each ship had a normal crew numbered 156 officers and sailors.

Dobler was propelled by a pair of diesel motors manufactured by General Motors, which drove a pair of screw propellers. Her propulsion system was rated to produce 6,000 brake horsepower (4,500 kW) for a top speed of 19.5 knots (36.1 km/h; 22.4 mph). Oil storage amounted to between 131 and 197 long tons (133 and 200 t), which allowed a cruising radius of up to 6,000 nautical miles (11,000 km; 6,900 mi) at an economical pace of 10 knots (19 km/h; 12 mph).

The ship's armament consisted of a main battery of three 3-inch (76 mm) /50-caliber guns in individual pivot mounts, which could be used against air or surface targets. These were supported by a light anti-aircraft battery that initially consisted of four 1.1 in (28 mm) /75-caliber guns in a quadruple mount and nine 20 mm (0.79 in) Oerlikon guns. For attacks against submarines, the ship was equipped with a Hedgehog mortar, eight depth charge throwers, and two depth charge racks.

== Service history ==
She was launched on 24 July 1942 as BDE-48 by Philadelphia Navy Yard, intended for transfer to Great Britain. The ship was instead retained for use by the United States and was renamed Dobler after Joseph Dobler, a naval aviator killed during the Battle of Rennell Island. Dobler was commissioned on 17 May 1943.

Dobler voyaged to Port Arthur, Texas, on escort duty from 15 to 28 July 1943, then served as a training ship. Reassigned to transatlantic convoy duty, from 27 August 1943 to 14 June 1945, Dobler made 11 voyages from Boston, Norfolk, and New York to Bizerte, Tunisia; Oran, Algeria; and Palermo, Sicily. On 11 May 1944, her convoy was attacked off the North African coast by a large number of torpedo and bombing planes which she aided in driving away before they could damage the convoy.

From 18 July to 10 September 1945, Dobler had training duty at New London, Connecticut. She arrived at New York on 11 September and was decommissioned there on 2 October 1945. Dobler was sold for scrap on 12 July 1946.

== Awards ==
- Combat Action Ribbon (retroactive)
- American Campaign Medal
- European-African-Middle Eastern Campaign Medal (with one service star)
- World War II Victory Medal
