= USS Charles R. Greer =

Evarts-class destroyer escort

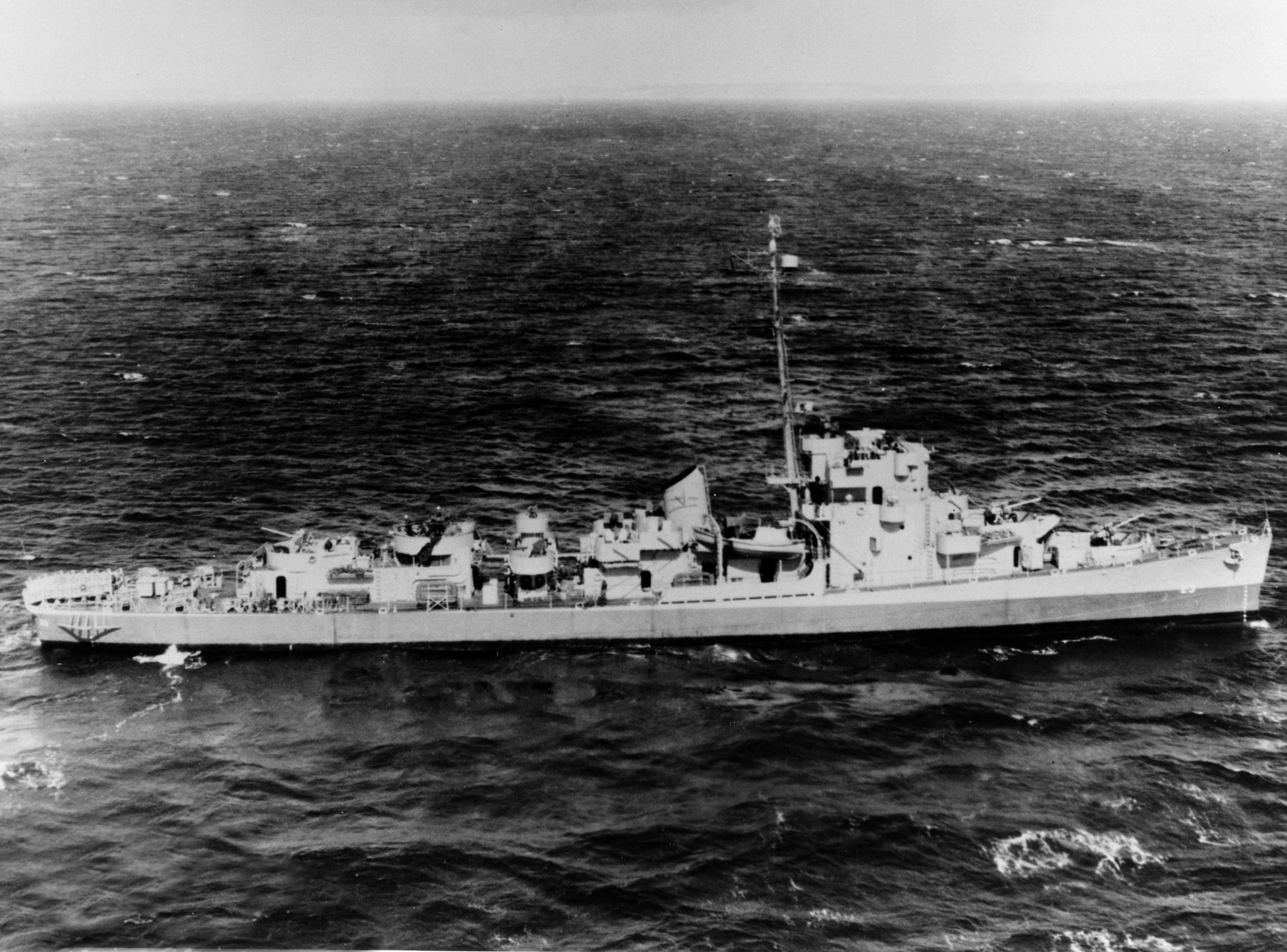
- Charles R. Greer underway, c. 5 April 1945

History

United States
- Name: USS Charles R. Greer
- Namesake: Charles Rogers Greer
- Builder: Mare Island Navy Yard
- Laid down: 7 September 1942
- Launched: 18 January 1943
- Commissioned: 25 June 1943
- Decommissioned: 2 November 1945
- Stricken: 16 November 1945
- Honors and awards: 2 battle stars (World War II)
- Fate: Sold for scrapping, 1 February 1947

General characteristics
- Type: Evarts-class destroyer escort
- Displacement: 1,140 long tons (1,158 t) standard; 1,430 long tons (1,453 t) full
- Length: 289 ft 5 in (88.21 m) o/a; 283 ft 6 in (86.41 m) w/l
- Beam: 35 ft (11 m)
- Draft: 11 ft (3.4 m) (max)
- Propulsion: 4 × General Motors Model 16-278A diesel engines with electric drive, 6,000 shp (4,474 kW); 2 screws
- Speed: 19 knots (35 km/h; 22 mph)
- Range: 4,150 nmi (7,690 km)
- Complement: 15 officers and 183 enlisted
- Armament: 3 × single 3"/50 Mk.22 dual purpose guns; 1 × quad 1.1"/75 Mk.2 AA gun; 9 × 20 mm Mk.4 AA guns; 1 × Hedgehog Projector Mk.10 (144 rounds); 8 × Mk.6 depth charge projectors; 2 × Mk.9 depth charge tracks

USS Charles R. Greer (DE-23) was an Evarts-class destroyer escort constructed for the United States Navy during World War II. She was promptly sent off into the Pacific Ocean to protect convoys and other ships from Japanese submarines and fighter aircraft. At the end of the war, she returned to the United States with two battle stars.

== Design ==
The Evarts-class destroyer escorts were 289 ft 5 in (88.21 m) long overall, and they had a beam of 35 ft 2 in (10.72 m). They had an average draft of 10 ft 1 in (3.07 m) at their full load displacement of 1,416 long tons (1,439 t). Each ship had a normal crew numbered 156 officers and sailors.

Charles R. Greer was propelled by a pair of diesel motors manufactured by General Motors, which drove a pair of screw propellers. Her propulsion system was rated to produce 6,000 brake horsepower (4,500 kW) for a top speed of 19.5 knots (36.1 km/h; 22.4 mph). Oil storage amounted to between 131 and 197 long tons (133 and 200 t), which allowed a cruising radius of up to 6,000 nautical miles (11,000 km; 6,900 mi) at an economical pace of 10 knots (19 km/h; 12 mph).

The ship's armament consisted of a main battery of three 3-inch (76 mm) /50-caliber guns in individual pivot mounts, which could be used against air or surface targets. These were supported by a light anti-aircraft battery that initially consisted of four 1.1 in (28 mm) /75-caliber guns in a quadruple mount and nine 20 mm (0.79 in) Oerlikon guns. For attacks against submarines, the ship was equipped with a Hedgehog mortar, eight depth charge throwers, and two depth charge racks.

== Service history ==
She was intended for Great Britain under Lend-Lease as BDE-23. However, Charles R. Greer was retained for American use and reclassified DE-23. The ship was thereafter renamed Charles R. Greer for Charles Greer, a marine recognized for his actions during the Battle of Corregidor. The ship launched 18 January 1943 by Mare Island Navy Yard, sponsored by Mrs. E. Greer, and was commissioned 25 June 1943.

Charles R. Greer's assignment in the U.S. Pacific Fleet was to the never-ending task of escorting convoys in the intricate meshing of movements demanded by the buildup of Pacific bases. She cleared San Francisco, California, on the first such mission 5 September 1943, bound for Pearl Harbor, Hawaii, which was to be her base until October 1944.

Her escort duty took her to west coast ports, to Funafuti in the Ellice Islands, and to the Gilberts and Marshalls. Early in December 1943 she formed part of the screen for the transports bringing the garrison force to Abemama in the Gilberts, where an important air base was soon developed. The next month she guarded the movement of the garrison for Majuro.

From October 1944 through February 1945, Charles R. Greer operated guarding convoys from Ulithi to Eniwetok, Guam, and Pearl Harbor. On 20 November 1944, her group came under attack by a lone enemy aircraft off Ulithi, but the fire of Charles R. Greer and the other escort vessels drove the Japanese plane off. She returned to Pearl Harbor from a west coast overhaul in April 1945, and took up a full schedule of training activities until late June, when she returned to the Marshall Islands for anti-submarine patrols, and convoy escort duty.

She left Eniwetok on 31 August to sail to Wake Island, where on 4 September she took part in the surrender ceremonies. She sailed on to Pearl Harbor, where she was decommissioned 2 November 1945 and sold 1 February 1947.

== Awards ==
- Combat Action Ribbon (retroactive)
- American Campaign Medal
- Asiatic-Pacific Campaign Medal (with two service stars)
- World War II Victory Medal
