= USS Carlson =

Evarts-class destroyer escort

History

United States
- Name: Carlson
- Builder: Boston Navy Yard
- Launched: 10 May 1943
- Commissioned: 10 May 1943
- Decommissioned: 10 December 1945
- Fate: Sold, 17 October 1946

General characteristics
- Class & type: Evarts-class destroyer escort
- Displacement: 1,140 long tons (1,160 t)
- Length: 289 ft 5 in (88.21 m)
- Beam: 35 ft 2 in (10.72 m)
- Speed: 19 1/2 knots (36.1 km/h; 22.4 mph)
- Range: 5,000 miles at 15 knots (28 km/h; 17 mph)
- Complement: 198
- Armament: 3 × single 3"/50 Mk.22 dual purpose guns; 1 × quad 1.1"/75 Mk.2 AA gun; 9 × 20 mm Mk.4 AA guns; 1 × Hedgehog Projector Mk.10 (144 rounds); 8 × Mk.6 depth charge projectors; 2 × Mk.9 depth charge tracks

USS Carlson (BDE-9/DE-9) was an Evarts-class short-hull destroyer escort in the United States Navy. It was named after Chief Machinist's Mate Daniel William Carlson (1899–1942), who was killed during the Battle of Midway aboard the destroyer USS Hammann. The ship was launched and commissioned in 1943. Carlson was assigned to the Pacific fleet during World War II and spent time as a convoy escort and took part in the Battle of Iwo Jima. At the end of the war in 1945 Carlson was decommissioned and the ship was sold the following year.

== Design ==
The Evarts-class destroyer escorts were 289 ft 5 in (88.21 m) long overall, and they had a beam of 35 ft 2 in (10.72 m). They had an average draft of 10 ft 1 in (3.07 m) at their full load displacement of 1,416 long tons (1,439 t). Each ship had a normal crew numbered 156 officers and sailors.

Carlson was propelled by a pair of diesel motors manufactured by General Motors, which drove a pair of screw propellers. Her propulsion system was rated to produce 6,000 brake horsepower (4,500 kW) for a top speed of 19.5 knots (36.1 km/h; 22.4 mph). Oil storage amounted to between 131 and 197 long tons (133 and 200 t), which allowed a cruising radius of up to 6,000 nautical miles (11,000 km; 6,900 mi) at an economical pace of 10 knots (19 km/h; 12 mph).

The ship's armament consisted of a main battery of three 3-inch (76 mm) /50-caliber guns in individual pivot mounts, which could be used against air or surface targets. These were supported by a light anti-aircraft battery that initially consisted of four 1.1 in (28 mm) /75-caliber guns in a quadruple mount and nine 20 mm (0.79 in) Oerlikon guns. For attacks against submarines, the ship was equipped with a Hedgehog mortar, eight depth charge throwers, and two depth charge racks.

== Service history ==
Carlson's keel was laid on 28 November 1941, at the Charlestown Navy Yard in Boston, Massachusetts. Carlson was originally scheduled for transfer to Britain as BDE-9. BDE-9 was launched on 10 May 1943, sponsored by Mrs. Irene Carlson, the widow of the ship's namesake, and commissioned 10 May 1943.

Carlson sailed from Norfolk, Virginia, 23 July 1943 for Espiritu Santo, where she arrived on 31 August. For seven months she was at sea almost constantly, aiding in the Guadalcanal and northern Solomon Islands operations with convoy escort and anti-submarine patrol services. Returning to San Francisco, California for overhaul in May 1944, Carlson trained with submarines and acted as target ship and plane guard for aircraft in the Hawaiian area from June through September 1944.

The escort vessel arrived at Eniwetok on 6 October 1944 to begin escort duty between that atoll and Ulithi, guarding convoys composed mainly of tankers. She thus contributed to the success of operations in the Philippines, and later at Iwo Jima, until 21 March 1945, when she sailed from Ulithi for Leyte. Here she was assigned to the screen of the Southern Attack Force for the assault on Okinawa.

Carlson's task unit arrived off Okinawa to launch the initial assault waves on the morning of 1 April 1945. During that day, and the five that followed, she conducted anti-submarine patrols during the daylight hours and retired to seaward guarding the transports at night. From 6–17 April, she sailed to Saipan and back, escorting transports and cargo ships with reinforcements, then took up a screening station between Okinawa and Kerama Retto. On her first night, a Japanese plane launched a torpedo which passed harmlessly under Carlson's bow. Three more times during the next two weeks Japanese planes were driven off by the escort vessel's gunners. After another voyage to Saipan, Carlson screened on various stations off Okinawa, during a period of heavy kamikaze attacks.

A kamikaze fighter struck Carlson on one occasion but the plane hit the water and lost all momentum before striking the ship, and did not explode. The dead Japanese pilot was retrieved by Carlson's crew.

Clearing Okinawa on 29 June 1945, she sailed to Leyte to join the screen for the replenishment group serving TF 38. With this group she aided the Third Fleet in maintaining a constant offensive on Japan proper through the close of the war. On 16 September, she got underway for San Pedro, California, where she was decommissioned on 10 December 1945. Carlson was sold on 17 October 1946.

Carlson received two battle stars for World War II service.

== Awards ==
- Combat Action Ribbon (retroactive)
- American Campaign Medal
- Asiatic-Pacific Campaign Medal (with two service stars)
- World War II Victory Medal
