= USS Doherty =

Evarts-class destroyer escort

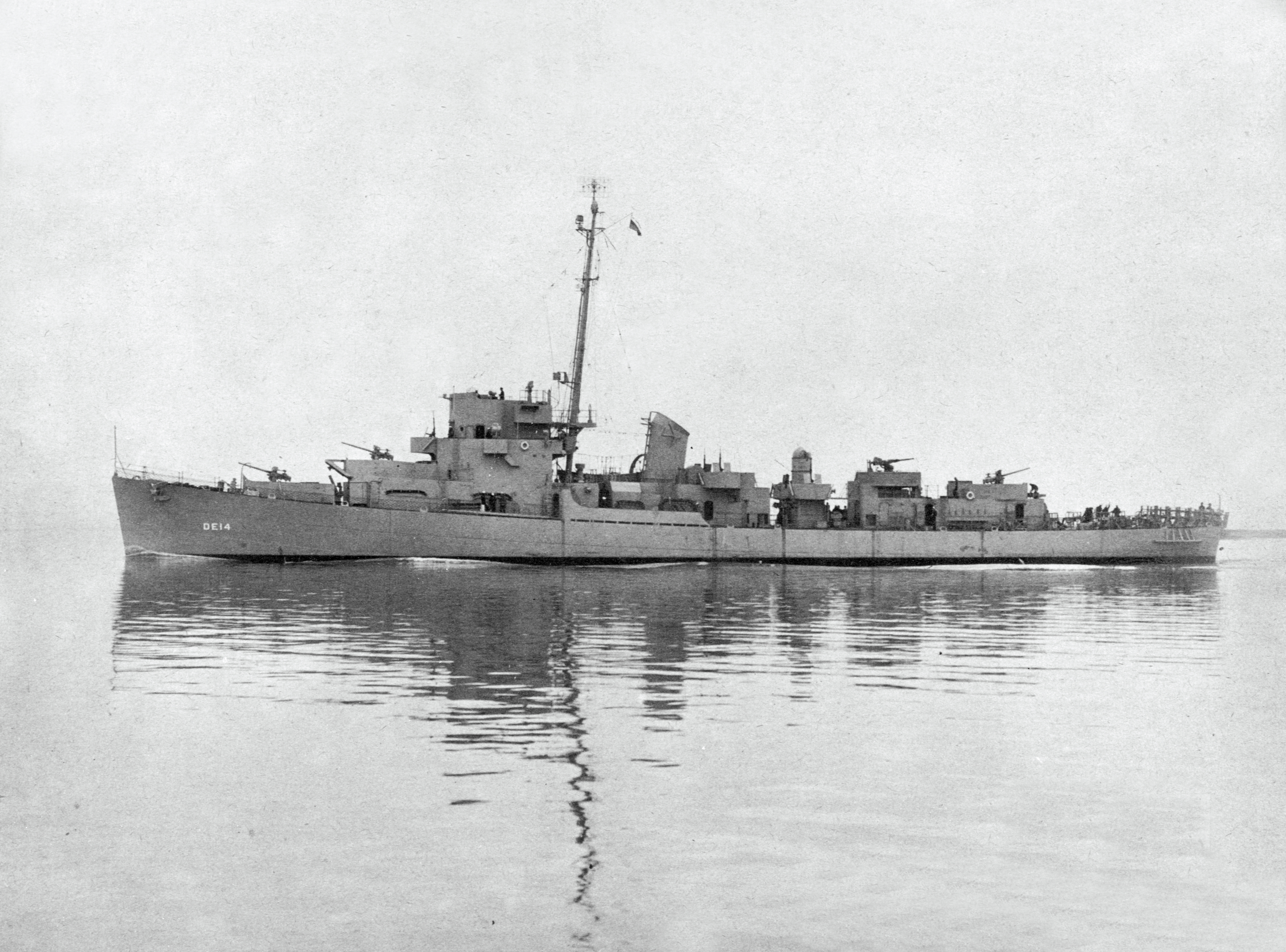
- USS Doherty (DE 14) 23 February 1943: off Mare Island

History

United States
- Name: USS Doherty (DE-14)
- Namesake: John Joseph Doherty
- Builder: Mare Island Navy Yard
- Laid down: 28 February 1942
- Launched: 29 August 1942 as HMS Berry (BDE-14)
- Commissioned: 6 February 1943 as USS Doherty (DE-14)
- Decommissioned: 14 December 1945
- Stricken: 8 January 1946
- Fate: Sold for scrap on 26 December 1946

General characteristics
- Class & type: Evarts class destroyer escort
- Displacement: 1,140 (standard), 1,430 tons (full)
- Length: 283 ft 6 in (86.41 m) (waterline), 289 ft 5 in (88.21 m) (overall))
- Beam: 35 ft 2 in (10.72 m)
- Draft: 11 ft 0 in (3.35 m) (max)
- Propulsion: 4 General Motors Model 16-278A diesel engines with electric drive *6000 shp; 2 screws
- Speed: 19 kn (35 km/h)
- Range: 4,150 nm
- Complement: 15 officers, 183 enlisted
- Armament: 3 × 3 in (76 mm) cal Mk 22 dual purpose guns (1×3), 4 × 1.1"/75 caliber gun (1×4), 9 × Oerlikon 20 mm Mk 4 AA cannons, 1 × Hedgehog Projector Mk 10 (144 rounds), 8 × Mk 6 depth charge projectors, 2 × Mk 9 depth charge tracks

USS Doherty (DE-14) was an Evarts class destroyer escort constructed for the United States Navy during World War II. She was sent off into the Pacific Ocean to protect convoys and other ships from Japanese submarines and fighter aircraft. She performed escort and antisubmarine operations in dangerous battle areas and returned home safely at war's end.

== Design ==
The Evarts-class destroyer escorts were 289 ft 5 in (88.21 m) long overall, and they had a beam of 35 ft 2 in (10.72 m). They had an average draft of 10 ft 1 in (3.07 m) at their full load displacement of 1,416 long tons (1,439 t). Each ship had a normal crew numbered 156 officers and sailors.

Doherty was propelled by a pair of diesel motors manufactured by General Motors, which drove a pair of screw propellers. Her propulsion system was rated to produce 6,000 brake horsepower (4,500 kW) for a top speed of 19.5 knots (36.1 km/h; 22.4 mph). Oil storage amounted to between 131 and 197 long tons (133 and 200 t), which allowed a cruising radius of up to 6,000 nautical miles (11,000 km; 6,900 mi) at an economical pace of 10 knots (19 km/h; 12 mph).

The ship's armament consisted of a main battery of three 3-inch (76 mm) /50-caliber guns in individual pivot mounts, which could be used against air or surface targets. These were supported by a light anti-aircraft battery that initially consisted of four 1.1 in (28 mm) /75-caliber guns in a quadruple mount and nine 20 mm (0.79 in) Oerlikon guns. For attacks against submarines, the ship was equipped with a Hedgehog mortar, eight depth charge throwers, and two depth charge racks.

== Service history ==
The ship, originally intended for transfer to Great Britain, was launched on 29 August 1942 as Berry (BDE-14) by Mare Island Navy Yard, but was retained for use by the United States Navy. The ship was renamed Doherty on 6 January 1943 after John Doherty, a naval aviator killed during the Marshall Islands Raid. She was commissioned on 6 February 1943.

After escorting a convoy to Cold Bay, Alaska from 23 April–11 May 1943, Doherty served on escort duty between the west coast and Pearl Harbor from 23 May – 15 September. She sailed from San Francisco, California on 15 September for duty in Alaskan waters where she escorted merchant ships and occasionally served as plane guard for United States Army Air Forces bomber strikes over the Kuriles. Doherty returned to San Francisco for overhaul on 28 September 1944, then sailed to San Diego, California, for training.

Leaving San Diego on 23 November, Doherty operated as a training vessel in submarine exercises at Pearl Harbor from 2 December 1944 – 5 February 1945. She arrived at Guam on 16 February on escort duty and for the rest of the war plied between Guam and Okinawa on escort, patrol and air-sea rescue missions.

Sailing from Guam on 12 October, Doherty arrived at San Pedro, California on 28 October, was decommissioned on 14 December 1945, and sold for scrap on 26 December 1946.

== Awards ==
- American Campaign Medal
- Asiatic-Pacific Campaign Medal
- World War II Victory Medal
