= French frigate Doudart de Lagrée =

Commandant Rivière-class frigate of the French Navy

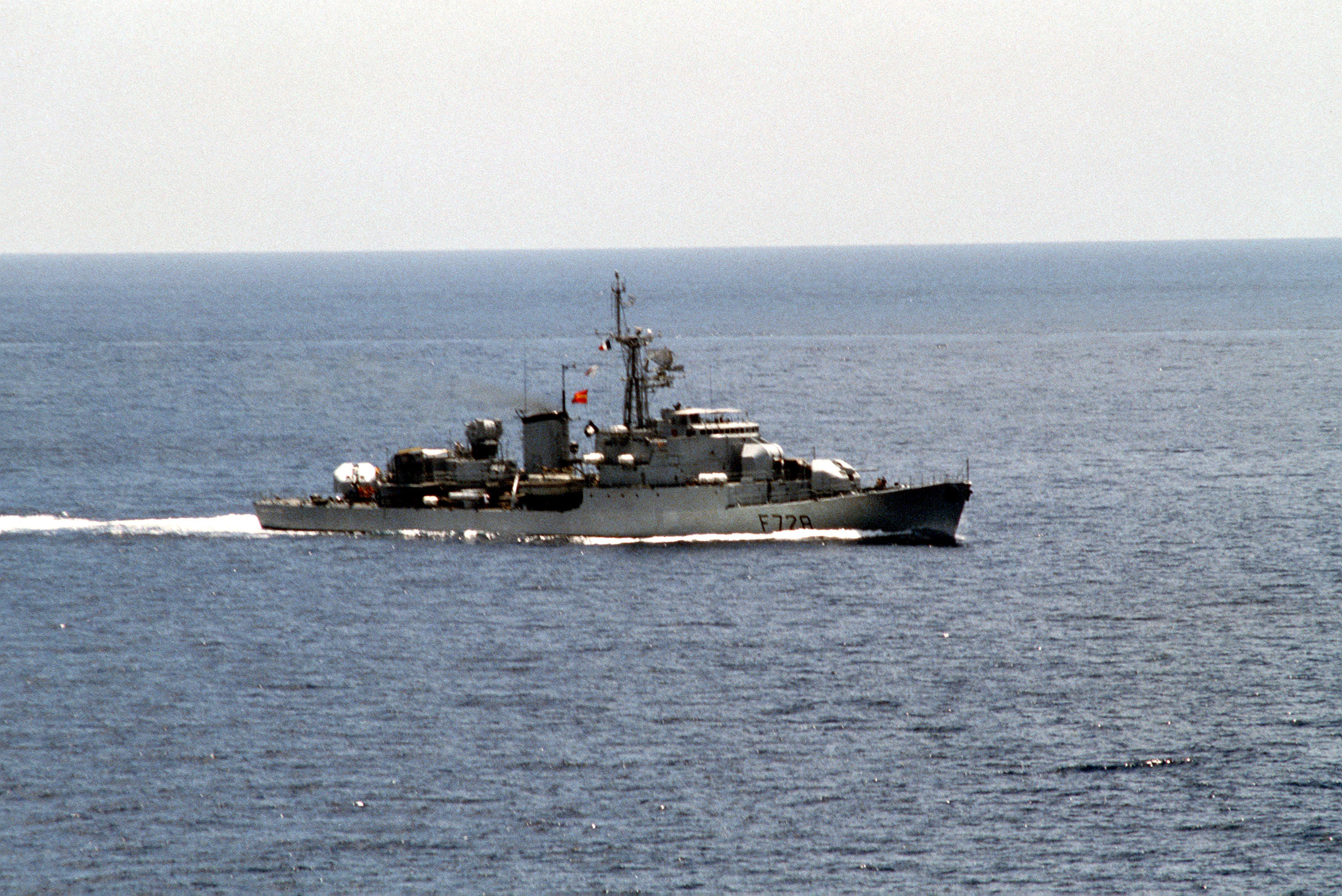
- Doudart de Lagrée

History

France
- Name: Doudart de Lagrée
- Namesake: Ernest Doudart de Lagrée
- Builder: Arsenal de Lorient, Lorient
- Laid down: March 1960
- Launched: 15 April 1961
- Commissioned: 1 May 1963
- Decommissioned: 1992
- Identification: Pennant number: F728
- Fate: Sunk as target, 29 November 1999

General characteristics
- Class & type: Commandant Rivière-class frigate
- Displacement: 1,720 long tons (1,750 t) standard; 2,190 long tons (2,230 t) full load
- Length: 98.0 m (321 ft 6 in) oa; 103.0 m (337 ft 11 in) pp
- Beam: 11.5 m (37 ft 9 in)
- Draught: 4.3 m (14 ft 1 in)
- Propulsion: 2 shafts (4 × SEMT-Pielstick 12-cylinder diesel engines); 16,000 bhp (12,000 kW)
- Speed: 25 knots (46 km/h; 29 mph)
- Range: 7,500 nmi (13,900 km; 8,600 mi) at 16 knots (30 km/h; 18 mph)
- Boats & landing craft carried: 2 × LCP landing craft
- Complement: 166
- Sensors & processing systems: DRBV22A air search radar; DRBC32C fire control radar; DUBA3 sonar; SQS17 sonar
- Armament: 3 × single 100 mm (4 in) guns - one gun later replaced by 4 MM38 Exocet missiles; 2 × 30 mm guns; 1 × 305 mm (12 in) anti-submarine mortar; 2 × triple 550 mm (22 in) torpedo tubes (6 × L5 torpedoes)

Doudart de Lagrée (F728) is a Commandant Rivière-class frigate in the French Navy.

== Development and design ==
Designed to navigate overseas, the escorts of the Doudart de Lagrée were fully air-conditioned.

A posting on a Aviso-escort was a boarding sought after by sailors because it guaranteed campaigns overseas and visits to the country.

Four other similar units were built at Ateliers et Chantiers de Bretagne (ACB) in Nantes for the Portuguese Navy under the class name João Belo.

All French units were decommissioned in the mid-1990s. Three ships were sold to the Uruguayan Navy.

In 1984, the Commandant Rivière frigate underwent a redesign to become an experimentation building. It retained only a single triple platform of 550mm anti-submarine torpedo tubes and the rest of the armament was landed, replaced by a single 40mm anti-aircraft gun and two 12.7mm machine guns.

== Construction and career ==
The Doudart de Lagrée was laid down in March 1960 at Arsenal de Lorient, Lorient. She was launched on April 15, 1961, and commissioned on May 1, 1963.

From 1981 to 1983, as a preserve of Joan of Arc, she carried out 22 patrols in the Persian Gulf.

In 1986, leading up to the Gulf War, she evacuated French nationals to Aden and a port base in Djibouti.

She was decommissioned in 1992, and her number was changed to Q686. She served as a breakwater in Brest from 1994 to 1999.

The Doudart de Lagrée was sunk as a target on November 29, 1999.
