= French frigate Commandant Bory =

Commandant Rivière-class frigate of the French Navy

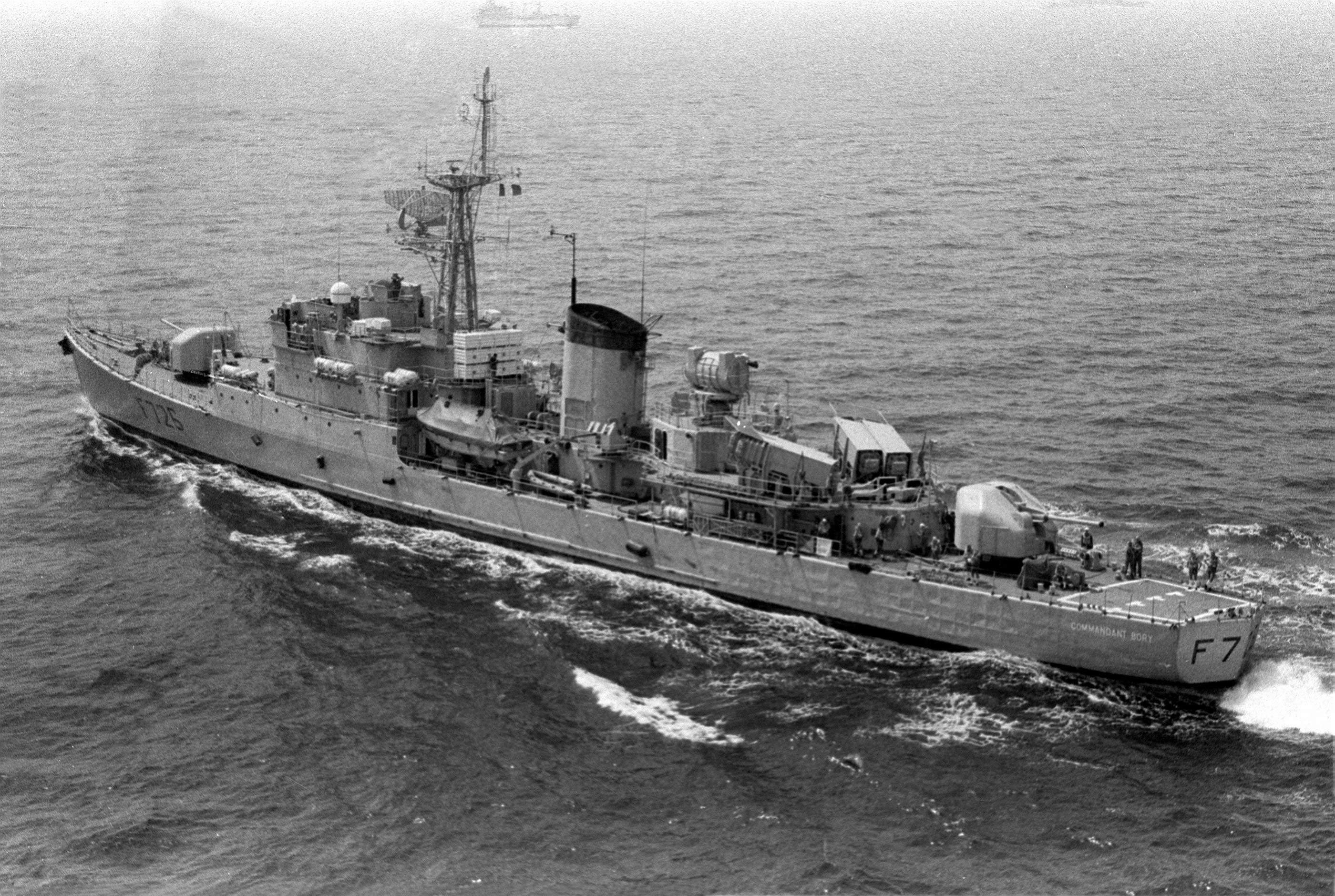
- Commandant Bory

History

France
- Name: Commandant Bory
- Namesake: Victor Bory
- Builder: Arsenal de Lorient, Lorient
- Laid down: May 1958
- Launched: 11 October 1958
- Commissioned: 5 March 1964
- Decommissioned: 1 September 1996
- Identification: Pennant number: F726
- Fate: Sunk as target, 2004

General characteristics
- Class & type: Commandant Rivière-class frigate
- Displacement: 1,720 long tons (1,750 t) standard; 2,190 long tons (2,230 t) full load
- Length: 98.0 m (321 ft 6 in) oa; 103.0 m (337 ft 11 in) pp
- Beam: 11.5 m (37 ft 9 in)
- Draught: 4.3 m (14 ft 1 in)
- Propulsion: 2 shafts (4 × SEMT-Pielstick 12-cylinder diesel engines); 16,000 bhp (12,000 kW)
- Speed: 25 knots (46 km/h; 29 mph)
- Range: 7,500 nmi (13,900 km; 8,600 mi) at 16 knots (30 km/h; 18 mph)
- Boats & landing craft carried: 2 × LCP landing craft
- Complement: 166
- Sensors & processing systems: DRBV22A air search radar; DRBC32C fire control radar; DUBA3 sonar; SQS17 sonar
- Armament: 3 × single 100 mm (4 in) guns - one gun later replaced by 4 MM38 Exocet missiles; 2 × 30 mm guns; 1 × 305 mm (12 in) anti-submarine mortar; 2 × triple 550 mm (22 in) torpedo tubes (6 × L5 torpedoes)

Commandant Bory (F726) was a Commandant Rivière-class frigate in the French Navy.

== Development and design ==
Designed to navigate overseas, the escorts were fully air-conditioned, resulting in appreciated comfort, which was far from being the case for other contemporary naval vessels.

A posting on an Aviso-escort was a boarding sought after by sailors because it was a guarantee of campaigning overseas and visiting the country.

Four other similar units were built at Ateliers et Chantiers de Bretagne (ACB) in Nantes for the Portuguese Navy under the class name João Belo.

All French units were decommissioned in the mid-1990s. Three ships were sold to the Uruguayan Navy.

In 1984, Commandant Rivière underwent a redesign to become an experimentation building. It will retain only a single triple platform of 550mm anti-submarine torpedo tubes and all the rest of the armament was landed, replaced by a single 40mm anti-aircraft gun and two 12.7mm machine guns.

== Construction and career ==
Commandant Bory was laid down in May 1958 at Arsenal de Lorient, Lorient. Launched on 11 October 1958 and commissioned on 5 March 1964.

In 1979, she underwent refit.

She was decommissioned on 1 September 1996, she served from 1996 to 2004 as a breakwater in Brest.

The ship was sunk as a target in 2004.
