= French frigate Balny =

Commandant Rivière-class frigate of the French Navy

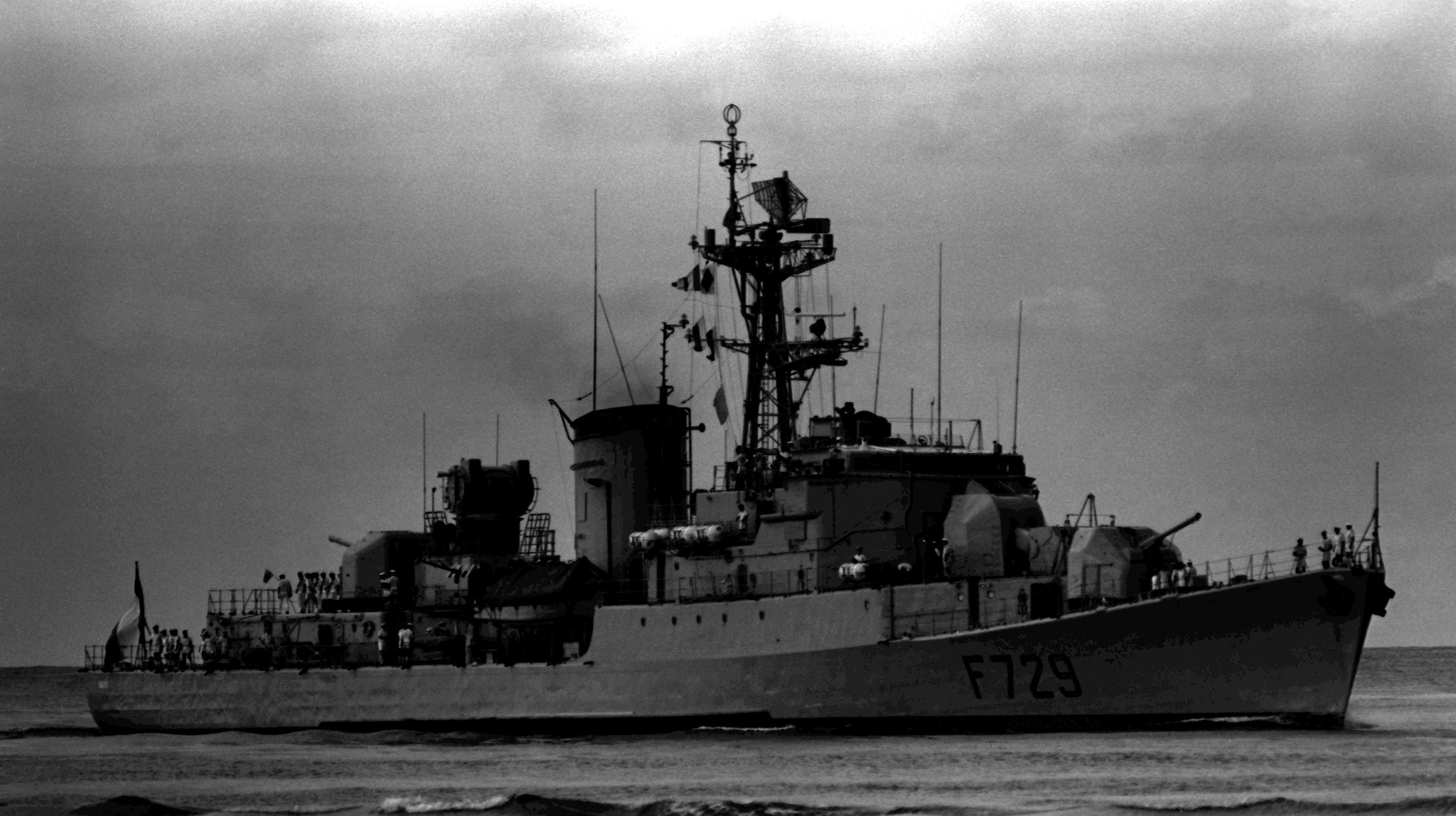
- Balny

History

France
- Name: Balny
- Namesake: Adrien-Paul Balny d'Avricourt
- Builder: Arsenal de Lorient, Lorient
- Laid down: March 1960
- Launched: 17 March 1962
- Commissioned: 1 February 1970
- Decommissioned: 1994
- Identification: Pennant number: F729
- Fate: Sunk as target, 2003

General characteristics
- Class & type: Commandant Rivière-class frigate
- Displacement: 1,720 long tons (1,750 t) standard; 2,190 long tons (2,230 t) full load
- Length: 98.0 m (321 ft 6 in) oa; 103.0 m (337 ft 11 in) pp
- Beam: 11.5 m (37 ft 9 in)
- Draught: 4.3 m (14 ft 1 in)
- Propulsion: 1 shaft CODAG (1 x 11,500 bhp (8,600 kW) Turbomeca M38 gas turbine + 2 x 3,600 bhp (2,700 kW) AGO V16 diesel engines); 18,700 bhp (13,900 kW)
- Speed: 26 knots (48 km/h; 30 mph)
- Range: 13,000 nmi (24,000 km; 15,000 mi) at 10 knots (19 km/h; 12 mph)
- Boats & landing craft carried: 2 × LCP landing craft
- Complement: 166
- Sensors & processing systems: DRBV22A air search radar; DRBC32C fire control radar; DUBA3 sonar; SQS17 sonar
- Armament: 2 × single 100 mm (4 in) guns - one gun later replaced by 4 MM38 Exocet missiles; 2 × 30 mm guns; 1 × 305 mm (12 in) anti-submarine mortar; 2 × triple 550 mm (22 in) torpedo tubes (6 × L5 torpedoes)

Balny (F729) is a Commandant Rivière-class frigate in the French Navy.

== Development and design ==
Designed to navigate overseas, the escorts were fully air-conditioned, resulting in appreciated comfort, which was far from being the case for other contemporary naval vessels.

A posting on an Aviso-escort was a boarding sought after by sailors because it was a guarantee of campaigning overseas and visiting the country.

Four other similar units were built at Ateliers et Chantiers de Bretagne (ACB) in Nantes for the Portuguese Navy under the class name João Belo.

All French units were decommissioned in the mid-1990s. Three ships were sold to the Uruguayan Navy.

Because a long-range was required for the overseas colonial role of the ships, most of the class was fitted with a 16,000-brake-horsepower (12,000 kW) two-shaft diesel powerplant. However Balny was fitted with an experimental CODAG (combined diesel and gas) installation, in which a Turbomeca M38 gas turbine (a modified Atar-8 aero-engine downrated from 15,000 bhp (11,000 kW) to 11,500 bhp (8,600 kW)) was combined with two 3,600 bhp (2,700 kW) AGO VI6 diesels for cruising. The gas turbine and the diesels could be clutched together to drive the single shaft, which was fitted with a 3.6m diameter controllable-pitch propeller. The CODAG arrangement took up less space, allowing 100 tons more fuel to be carried and giving a range of 13,000 nautical miles (24,000 km; 15,000 mi) at 10 knots (19 km/h; 12 mph). Balny omitted one 100 mm gun turret to accommodate the revised machinery.

== Construction and career ==
Balny was laid down in March 1960 at Arsenal de Lorient, Lorient. Launched on 17 March 1962 and commissioned on 1 February 1970.

She was decommissioned in 1994 and serve as a breakwater in Lanvéoc-Poulmic from 1994 to 2003.

Sunk as target in 2003.
