= French frigate Protet =

Commandant Rivière-class frigate of the French Navy

- Commandant Rivière-class frigate

History

France
- Name: Protet
- Namesake: Auguste Léopold Protet
- Builder: Arsenal de Lorient, Lorient
- Laid down: September 1961
- Launched: 7 December 1962
- Commissioned: 1 May 1964
- Decommissioned: 1992
- Identification: Pennant number: F748
- Fate: Sunk as target, 2001

General characteristics
- Class & type: Commandant Rivière-class frigate
- Displacement: 1,720 long tons (1,750 t) standard; 2,190 long tons (2,230 t) full load
- Length: 98.0 m (321 ft 6 in) oa; 103.0 m (337 ft 11 in) pp
- Beam: 11.5 m (37 ft 9 in)
- Draught: 4.3 m (14 ft 1 in)
- Propulsion: 2 shafts (4 × SEMT-Pielstick 12-cylinder diesel engines); 16,000 bhp (12,000 kW)
- Speed: 25 knots (46 km/h; 29 mph)
- Range: 7,500 nmi (13,900 km; 8,600 mi) at 16 knots (30 km/h; 18 mph)
- Boats & landing craft carried: 2 × LCP landing craft
- Complement: 166
- Sensors & processing systems: DRBV22A air search radar; DRBC32C fire control radar; DUBA3 sonar; SQS17 sonar
- Armament: 3 × single 100 mm (4 in) guns - one gun later replaced by 4 MM38 Exocet missiles; 2 × 30 mm guns; 1 × 305 mm (12 in) anti-submarine mortar; 2 × triple 550 mm (22 in) torpedo tubes (6 × L5 torpedoes)

Protet (F748) is a Commandant Rivière-class frigate in the French Navy.

== Development and design ==
Designed to navigate overseas, the escorts were fully air-conditioned, resulting in appreciated comfort, which was far from being the case for other contemporary naval vessels.

A posting on an Aviso-escort was a boarding sought after by sailors because it was a guarantee of campaigning overseas and visiting the country.

Four other similar units were built at Ateliers et Chantiers de Bretagne (ACB) in Nantes for the Portuguese Navy under the class name João Belo.

All French units were decommissioned in the mid-1990s. Three ships were sold to the Uruguayan Navy.

In 1984, Commandant Rivière underwent a redesign to become an experimentation building. It will retain only a single triple platform of 550mm anti-submarine torpedo tubes and all the rest of the armament was landed, replaced by a single 40mm anti-aircraft gun and two 12.7mm machine guns.

== Construction and career ==
Protet was laid down in September 1961 at Arsenal de Lorient, Lorient. Launched on 7 December 1962 and commissioned on 1 May 1964.

In 1991, before the Operation Desert Storm, the vessel embarked additional equipment in Djibouti (Inmarsat, infrared camera, Mistral missiles, stealth tarpaulins, etc.). Until the end of the year, the embargo control missions alternate with stopovers (Kenya, Seychelles, Pakistan, Gulf countries). The last commander, Commander de Roquefeuil, takes up his duties in Djibouti during the month of May.

In 1992, the previous year, the vessel carried out embargo control missions and several stopovers (Monbasa, Singapore, Colombo, Chittagong) before leaving Djibouti on Saturday June 13, 1992. It returned to Toulon on Monday June 22, 1992 for there start disarmament operations. Her last outing to the sea will take place on the occasion of the traditional outing of his commanders on Thursday, June 25, 1992.

In 4,020 days at sea, this vessel will have circled the Earth 44 times, or approximately 960,000 nautical miles (1,780,000 km). She was decommissioned on 29 June 1992 and sunk as target off the coast of Toulon by a combined naval air force during a Trident exercise on 24 May 2001.
