= French frigate Enseigne de Vaisseau Henry =

Commandant Rivière-class frigate of the French Navy

- Commandant Rivière-class frigate

History

France
- Name: Enseigne de Vaisseau Henry
- Namesake: Paul Charles Joseph Martin Henry
- Builder: Arsenal de Lorient, Lorient
- Laid down: September 1962
- Launched: 14 December 1963
- Commissioned: 1 January 1965
- Decommissioned: 1994
- Identification: Pennant number: F749
- Fate: Scrapped, 2016

General characteristics
- Class & type: Commandant Rivière-class frigate
- Displacement: 1,720 long tons (1,750 t) standard; 2,190 long tons (2,230 t) full load
- Length: 98.0 m (321 ft 6 in) oa; 103.0 m (337 ft 11 in) pp
- Beam: 11.5 m (37 ft 9 in)
- Draught: 4.3 m (14 ft 1 in)
- Propulsion: 2 shafts (4 × SEMT-Pielstick 12-cylinder diesel engines); 16,000 bhp (12,000 kW)
- Speed: 25 knots (46 km/h; 29 mph)
- Range: 7,500 nmi (13,900 km; 8,600 mi) at 16 knots (30 km/h; 18 mph)
- Boats & landing craft carried: 2 × LCP landing craft
- Complement: 166
- Sensors & processing systems: DRBV22A air search radar; DRBC32C fire control radar; DUBA3 sonar; SQS17 sonar
- Armament: 3 × single 100 mm (4 in) guns - one gun later replaced by 4 MM38 Exocet missiles; 2 × 30 mm guns; 1 × 305 mm (12 in) anti-submarine mortar; 2 × triple 550 mm (22 in) torpedo tubes (6 × L5 torpedoes)

Enseigne de Vaisseau Henry (F749) is a Commandant Rivière-class frigate in the French Navy.

== Development and design ==
Designed to navigate overseas, the escorts were fully air-conditioned, resulting in appreciated comfort, which was far from being the case for other contemporary naval vessels.

A posting on an Aviso-escort was a boarding sought after by sailors because it was a guarantee of campaigning overseas and visiting the country.

Four other similar units were built at Ateliers et Chantiers de Bretagne (ACB) in Nantes for the Portuguese Navy under the class name João Belo.

All French units were decommissioned in the mid-1990s. Three ships were sold to the Uruguayan Navy.

In 1984, Commandant Rivière underwent a redesign to become an experimentation building. It will retain only a single triple platform of 550mm anti-submarine torpedo tubes and all the rest of the armament was landed, replaced by a single 40mm anti-aircraft gun and two 12.7mm machine guns.

== Construction and career ==
Enseigne de Vaisseau Henry was laid down in September 1962 at Arsenal de Lorient, Lorient. Launched on 14 December 1963 and commissioned on 1 January 1965.

In 1973, an experimental helicopter platform was installed above the rear deck, to be then dismantled in 1979, to reinstall its old 100 mm gun.

In 1985, two 40 mm Bofors anti-aircraft guns replaced the 30 mm HSS831 guns.

Her ASM mortar (305 mm) and torpedo tubes were landed in 1990.

In 1994, she was decommissioned and served as a breakwater at the port of Brest.

Provisionally anchored in the Landévennec ship cemetery awaiting dismantling, it left the scene on September 12, 2015 for the military port of Brest, where it was prepared for its transfer which took place on February 25, 2016, to the shipyard of Ghent, Belgium, to be deconstructed by the Franco-Belgian group Galloo.
