= French frigate Commandant Bourdais =

Commandant Rivière-class frigate

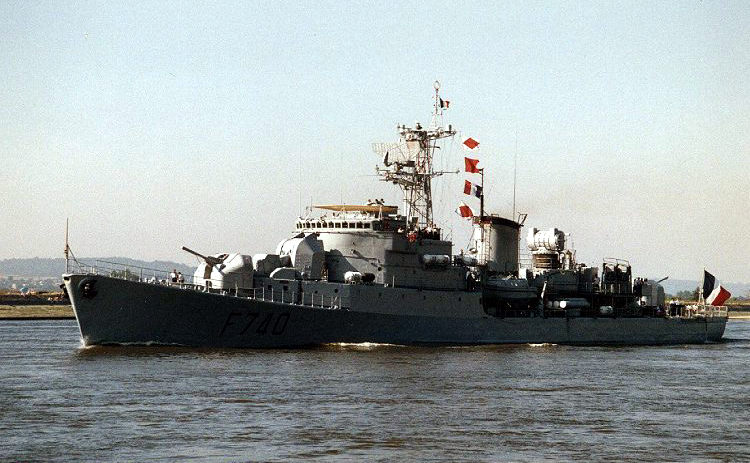
- Commandant Bourdais at Seine River in July 1989

History

France
- Name: Commandant Bourdais
- Namesake: Adrien Bourdais
- Builder: Arsenal de Lorient, Lorient
- Laid down: April 1959
- Launched: 15 April 1961
- Commissioned: 10 March 1963
- Decommissioned: 1990
- Identification: Pennant number: F 740
- Fate: Sold to Uruguay Navy in 1991

Uruguay
- Name: Uruguay
- Namesake: Uruguay
- Acquired: 1991
- Commissioned: 1991
- Decommissioned: 2008
- Identification: Pennant number: ROU 01
- Fate: Scrapped

General characteristics
- Class & type: Commandant Rivière-class frigate
- Displacement: 1,750 tons standard, 2,230 tons full load
- Length: 98.0 m (321 ft 6 in) oa; 103.0 m (337 ft 11 in) pp
- Beam: 11.5 m (37 ft 9 in)
- Draught: 4.3 m (14 ft 1 in)
- Propulsion: 2 shafts (4 × SEMT-Pielstick 12-cylinder diesel engines); 16,000 bhp (12,000 kW)
- Speed: 25 knots (46 km/h; 29 mph)
- Range: 7,500 nmi (13,900 km; 8,600 mi) at 16 knots (30 km/h; 18 mph)
- Boats & landing craft carried: 2 × LCP landing craft
- Complement: 166
- Sensors & processing systems: DRBV22A air search radar; DRBC32C fire control radar; DUBA3 sonar; SQS17 sonar
- Armament: (Early service); 3 x 100 mm (4 in) guns; 2 x 30 mm guns; 1 x 305 mm (12 in) anti-submarine mortar; 6 x 550 mm (22 in) torpedo tubes (6 L5 torpedoes); (Late Service); 2 x 100 mm (4 in) guns; 4 x MM38 Exocet missiles; 2 x 30 mm guns; 1 x 305 mm (12 in) anti-submarine mortar; 6 x 550 mm (22 in) torpedo tubes (6 L5 torpedoes)

Commandant Bourdais (F 740) was a Commandant Rivière-class frigate of French Navy, launched on 15 April 1961 and commissioned on 10 March 1963. She was later sold to National Navy of Uruguay in 1991 where she served as ROU 01 Uruguay until her decommissioning in 2008.

== Development and design ==
The main gun armament of the Commandant Rivière class consisted of three of the new French 100-millimetre (4 in) guns, with a single turret located forward and two turrets aft. These water-cooled automatic dual-purpose guns could fire a 13.5-kilogram (30 lb) shell at an effective range of 12,000 metres (39,000 ft) against surface targets and 6,000 m (20,000 ft) against aircraft at a rate of 60 rounds per minute. A quadruple 305 mm (12 in) anti-submarine mortar was fitted in 'B' position, aft of the forward gun and in front of the ship's superstructure, capable of firing a 230 kg (510 lb) depth charge to 3,000 m (9,800 ft) or in the shore bombardment role, a 100 kg (220 lb) projectile to 6,000 m (20,000 ft). Two triple torpedo tubes were fitted for anti-submarine torpedoes, while the ship's armament was completed by two 30 mm (1.2 in) Hotchkiss HS-30 cannon. The ships had accommodation for an 80-man commando detachment with two fast landing boats, each capable of landing 25 personnel.

== Construction and career ==
Commandant Bourdais was laid down in April 1959 and launched on 15 April 1961 at Arsenal de Lorient in Lorient. The frigate was commissioned on 10 March 1963.

The ship was sold to Uruguay in 1991 and given the new name Uruguay and was in service until 2008. She was sold for scrap some years later.
