= French frigate Commandant Rivière =

Commandant Rivière-class frigate

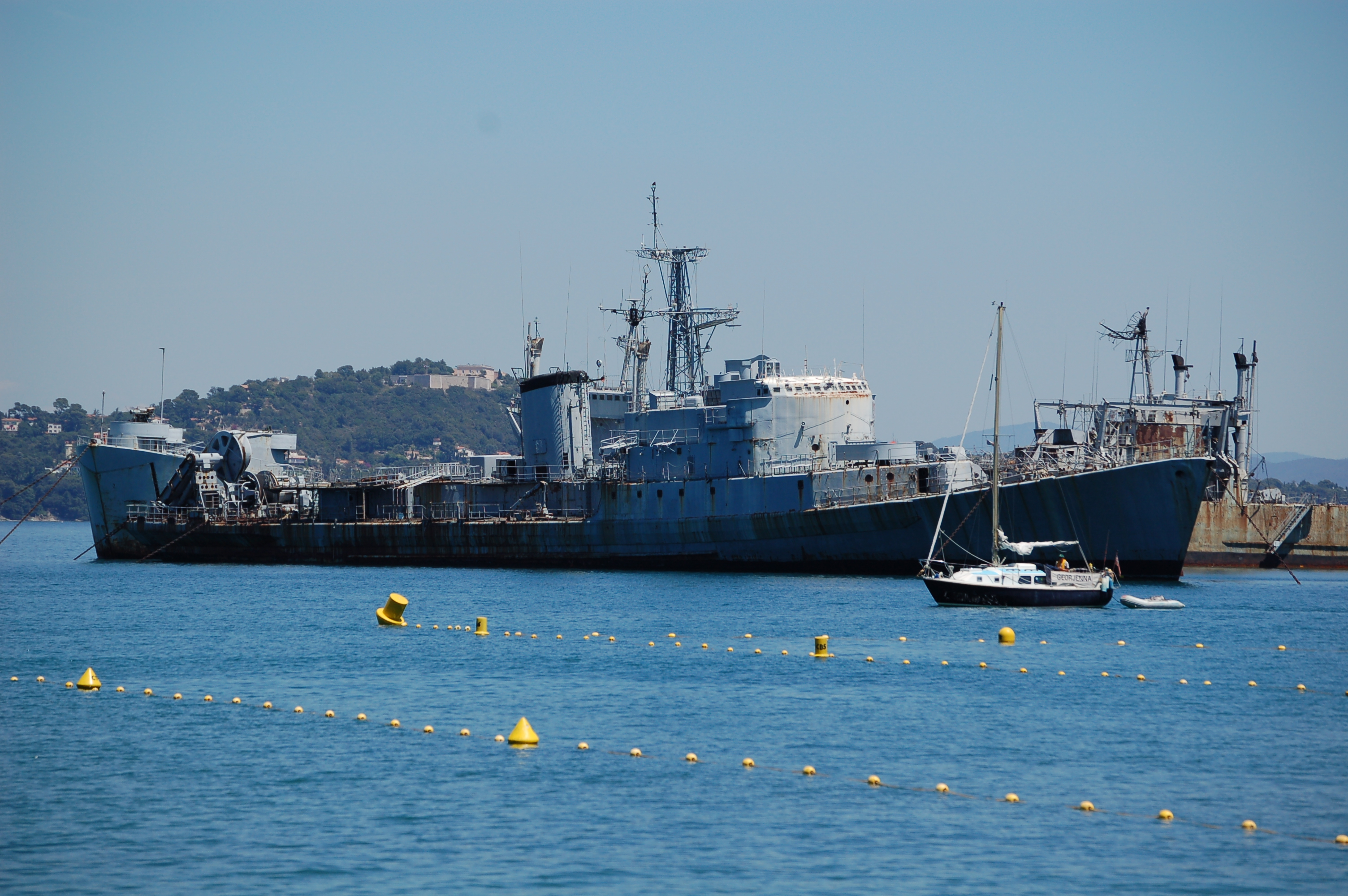
- Commandant Rivière awaiting scrap on 12 July 2007

History

France
- Name: Commandant Rivière
- Namesake: Henri Rivière
- Builder: Arsenal de Lorient, Lorient
- Laid down: April 1957
- Launched: 11 October 1958
- Commissioned: 4 December 1962
- Decommissioned: 1992
- Identification: Pennant number: F 733
- Fate: Scrapped at Ghent, 2015

General characteristics
- Class & type: Commandant Rivière-class frigate
- Displacement: 1,750 tons standard, 2,230 tons full load
- Length: 98.0 m (321 ft 6 in) oa; 103.0 m (337 ft 11 in) pp
- Beam: 11.5 m (37 ft 9 in)
- Draught: 4.3 m (14 ft 1 in)
- Propulsion: 2 shafts (4 × SEMT-Pielstick 12-cylinder diesel engines); 16,000 bhp (12,000 kW)
- Speed: 25 knots (46 km/h; 29 mph)
- Range: 7,500 nmi (13,900 km; 8,600 mi) at 16 knots (30 km/h; 18 mph)
- Boats & landing craft carried: 2 × LCP landing craft
- Complement: 166
- Sensors & processing systems: DRBV22A air search radar; DRBC32C fire control radar; DUBA3 sonar; SQS17 sonar
- Armament: (Early service); 3 × 100 mm (4 in) guns; 2 × 30 mm guns; 1 × 305 mm (12 in) anti-submarine mortar; 6 × 550 mm (22 in) torpedo tubes (6 L5 torpedoes); (Late Service); 2 × 100 mm (4 in) guns; 4 × MM38 Exocet missiles; 2 × 30 mm guns; 1 × 305 mm (12 in) anti-submarine mortar; 6 × 550 mm (22 in) torpedo tubes (6 L5 torpedoes)

Commandant Rivière (F 733) was a Commandant Rivière-class frigate of French Navy.

== Development and design ==
The main gun armament of the Commandant Rivière class consisted of three of the new French 100 mm (4 in) guns, with a single turret located forward and two turrets aft. These water-cooled automatic dual-purpose guns could fire a 13.5 kg (30 lb) shell at an effective range of 12,000 m (39,000 ft) against surface targets and 6,000 m (20,000 ft) against aircraft at a rate of 60 rounds per minute. A quadruple 305 mm anti-submarine mortar was fitted in 'B' position, aft of the forward gun and in front of the ship's superstructure, capable of firing a 230 kg (510 lb) depth charge to 3,000 m (9,800 ft) or in the shore bombardment role, a 100 kg (220 lb) projectile to 6,000 m (20,000 ft). Two triple torpedo tubes were fitted for anti-submarine torpedoes, while the ship's armament was completed by two 30 mm Hotchkiss HS-30 cannon. The ships had accommodation for an 80-man commando detachment with two fast landing boats, each capable of landing 25 men.

== Construction and career ==
Commandant Rivière was laid down in April 1957 and launched on 11 October 1958 at Arsenal de Lorient in Lorient. The vessel was commissioned on 4 December 1962.

In 1984–1985, Commandant Rivière was converted to a sonar-trials ship. The ship's armament was replaced by a single 40 mm Bofors gun and two 12.7 mm machine guns, while the ship's stern was rebuilt to accommodate a hoist for a variable depth sonar, which was used to test various active and passive towed array sonars.

She served as a breakwater in Saint-Mandrier from 1993 to 2009 after decommissioning in 1992. She awaited dismantling in Toulon from 2009 to 2014 and dismantled in Ghent in 2015.
