= French frigate Victor Schœlcher =

Commandant Rivière-class frigate

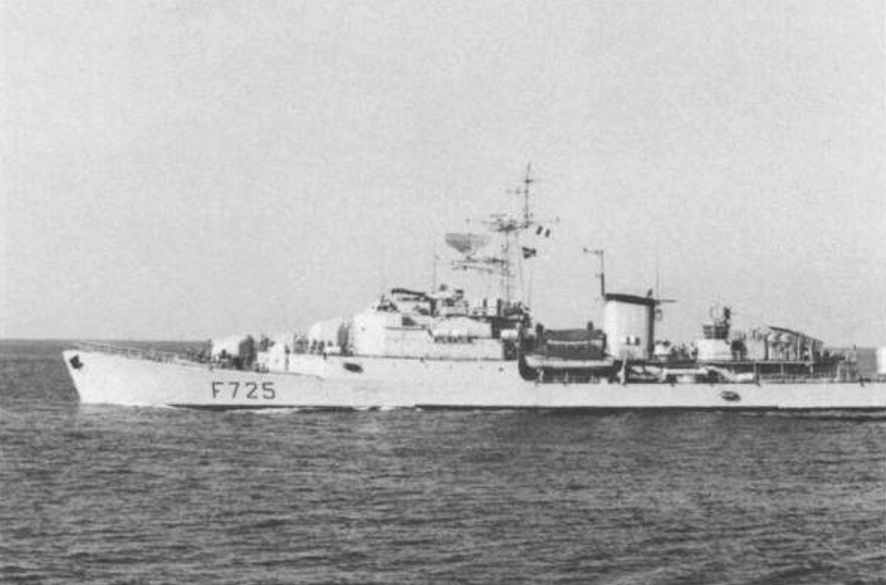
- Victor Schœlcher underway in 1987

History

France
- Name: Victor Schoelcher
- Namesake: Victor Schœlcher
- Builder: Arsenal de Lorient, Lorient
- Laid down: October 1957
- Launched: 11 October 1958
- Commissioned: 4 December 1962
- Decommissioned: 1988
- Identification: Pennant number: F 725
- Fate: Sold to Uruguay Navy in 1988

Uruguay
- Name: General Artigas
- Namesake: José Gervasio Artigas
- Acquired: 19 December 1988
- Commissioned: 19 December 1988
- Decommissioned: 27 April 2005
- Identification: Pennant number: ROU 02
- Fate: Scrapped on 27 April 2005

General characteristics
- Class & type: Commandant Rivière-class frigate
- Displacement: 1,750 tons standard, 2,230 tons full load
- Length: 98.0 m (321 ft 6 in) oa; 103.0 m (337 ft 11 in) pp
- Beam: 11.5 m (37 ft 9 in)
- Draught: 4.3 m (14 ft 1 in)
- Propulsion: 2 shafts (4 × SEMT-Pielstick 12-cylinder diesel engines); 16,000 bhp (12,000 kW)
- Speed: 25 knots (46 km/h; 29 mph)
- Range: 7,500 nmi (13,900 km; 8,600 mi) at 16 knots (30 km/h; 18 mph)
- Boats & landing craft carried: 2 × LCP landing craft
- Complement: 166
- Sensors & processing systems: DRBV22A air search radar; DRBC32C fire control radar; DUBA3 sonar; SQS17 sonar
- Armament: (Early service); 3 x 100 mm (4 in) guns; 2 x 30 mm guns; 1 x 305 mm (12 in) anti-submarine mortar; 6 x 550 mm (22 in) torpedo tubes (6 L5 torpedoes); (Late Service); 2 x 100 mm (4 in) guns; 4 x MM38 Exocet missiles; 2 x 30 mm guns; 1 x 305 mm (12 in) anti-submarine mortar; 6 x 550 mm (22 in) torpedo tubes (6 L5 torpedoes)

Victor Schœlcher (F 725) was a Commandant Rivière-class frigate of French Navy. She was later transferred to National Navy of Uruguay in 1988 and given the name General Artigas. The ship was scrapped in 2005.

== Development and design ==
The main gun armament of the Commandant Rivière class consisted of three of the new French 100-millimetre (4 in) guns, with a single turret located forward and two turrets aft. These water-cooled automatic dual-purpose guns could fire a 13.5-kilogram (30 lb) shell at an effective range of 12,000 metres (39,000 ft) against surface targets and 6,000 m (20,000 ft) against aircraft at a rate of 60 rounds per minute. A quadruple 305 mm (12 in) anti-submarine mortar was fitted in 'B' position, aft of the forward gun and in front of the ship's superstructure, capable of firing a 230 kg (510 lb) depth charge to 3,000 m (9,800 ft) or in the shore bombardment role, a 100 kg (220 lb) projectile to 6,000 m (20,000 ft). Two triple torpedo tubes were fitted for anti-submarine torpedoes, while the ship's armament was completed by two 30 mm (1.2 in) Hotchkiss HS-30 cannon. The ship had accommodation for an 80-man commando detachment with two fast landing boats, each capable of landing 25 personnel.

== Construction and career ==
Victor Schœlcher was laid down in October 1957 and launched on 11 October 1958 at Arsenal de Lorient in Lorient. The vessel was commissioned on 4 December 1962.

Victor Schœlcher operated among other places with the Indian Navy and collaborated in the evacuation of the Diego Suarez base in the independence of Madagascar. She helped in Cyclone Andry in 1983 by rescuing refugees in the Pacific.

The frigate was sold to Uruguay in 1988 and given the new name General Artigas. The ship remained in service until 27 April 2005.
