= João Belo-class frigate =

1967 subclass of Commandant Rivière-class frigates

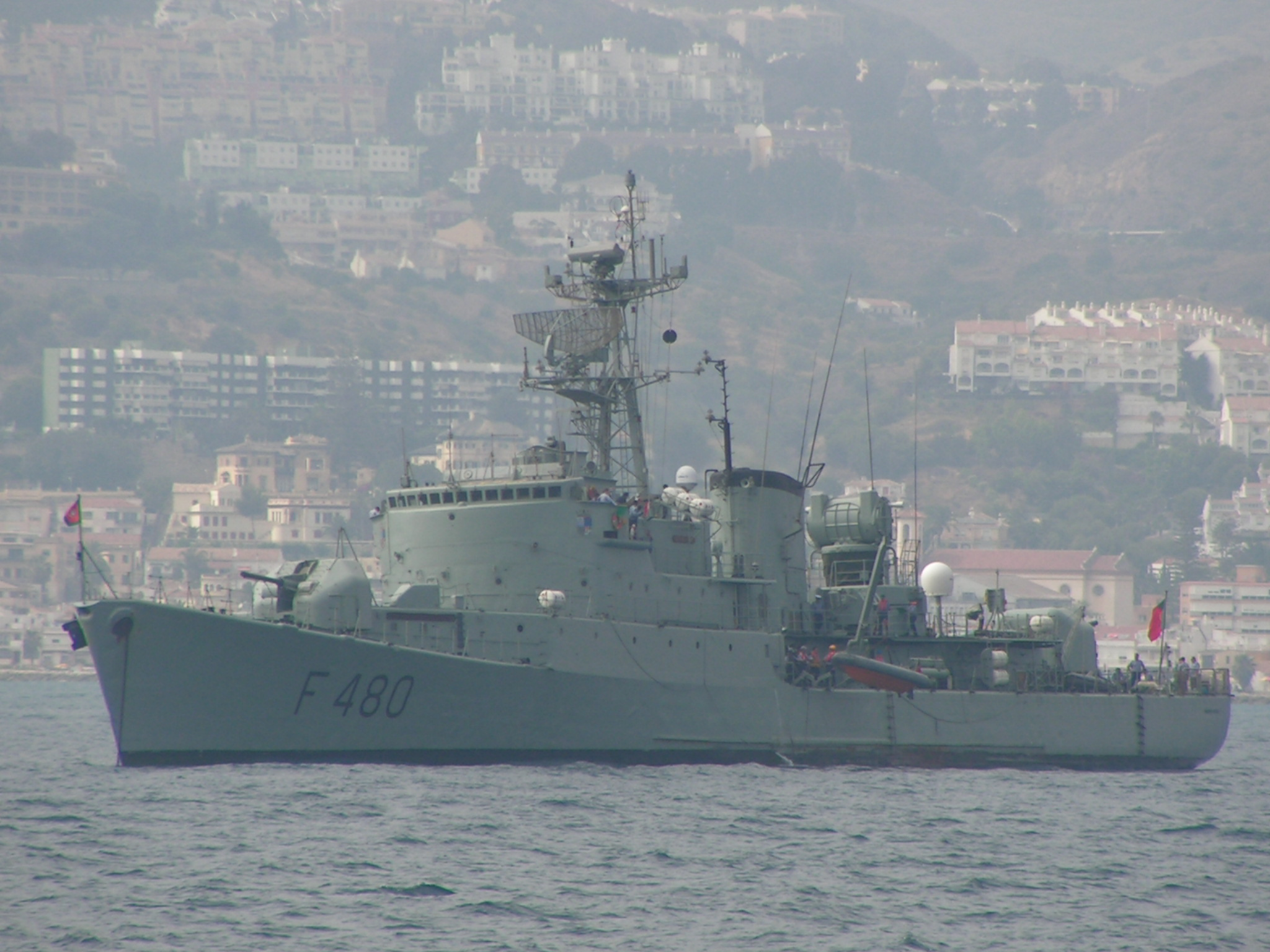
- NRP Comandante João Belo

Class overview
- Name: João Belo class
- Builders: AC de Nantes, France
- Operators: Portuguese Navy; National Navy of Uruguay
- Preceded by: Almirante Pereira da Silva class
- Succeeded by: Bartolomeu Dias class
- In commission: 1967–2022
- Completed: 4
- Retired: 4
- Scrapped: 3

General characteristics as built
- Type: Frigate
- Displacement: 1,780 t (1,750 long tons); 2,290 t (2,250 long tons) full load
- Length: 102.7 m (336 ft 11 in)
- Beam: 11.7 m (38 ft 5 in)
- Draught: 4.4 m (14 ft 5 in)
- Installed power: 4 diesel engines SEMT Pielstick V12 PC 16,000 bhp (12,000 kW)
- Propulsion: 2 shafts
- Speed: 26.6 knots (49.3 km/h; 30.6 mph) max
- Range: 4,500 nmi (8,300 km; 5,200 mi) at 15 kn (28 km/h; 17 mph)
- Complement: 214
- Sensors & processing systems: DRBV22A sentry radar; DRBC31D fire control radar; DRBV50 surface search; DUBA3 sonar; SQS17 sonar
- Electronic warfare & decoys: ARBR10 radar detector
- Armament: 3 × single 100 mm (3.9 in) guns; 2 × 40 mm (1.6 in) guns; 1 × 305 mm (12 in) anti-submarine mortar; 2 × triple 550 mm (22 in) torpedo tubes

The João Belo class, also known as Comandante João Belo class, is a class of four frigates of French design, based on the Commandant Rivière class but fitted for tropical service. Ordered by the Portuguese Navy in 1964, the four ships of this class were constructed at the shipyard in Nantes, France between 1965 and 1967. The first ship entered Portuguese service in 1967. The frigates were used for ocean patrol of Portuguese colonies and later, joined NATO's STANAVFORLANT unit. The first unit was discarded in 2003, followed by a second in 2004. The final two ships were taken out of service in 2008 sold to the Uruguayan Navy. The third ship was discarded in 2021, and the last ship was decommissioned on 12 August 2022.

== Background ==
After World War II, Portugal retained much of its colonial empire. However, beginning in 1961, the Portuguese colonial empire saw unrest and invasion. This led Portugal to increase the number of ships capable of operating in colonial waters. In the 1960s the Portuguese Navy was interested in the acquisition of British frigates of the Leander class, but because of British political opposition against Portugal this acquisition was impossible. Portugal was then forced to buy frigates of an already existing project due to the urgency in the acquisition of naval ships for the defense of African, Macanese and Timorese waters.

== Description and design ==
Based on the French Commandant Rivière class, the João Belo class was designed for coastal patrol and convoy escort duty. However, due to their planned use in Portuguese colonies in the Pacific and African regions, they had additional equipment installed for tropical service. The vessels as built measured 102.7 metres (336 ft 11 in) long overall with a beam of 11.7 m (38 ft 5 in) and a draught of 4.4 m (14 ft 5 in). The vessels had a standard displacement of 1,780 t (1,750 long tons) and 2,290 t (2,250 long tons) at full load. The frigates were propelled by two shafts powered by four SEMT Pielstick V12 PC diesel engines creating 16,000 bhp (12,000 kW). This gave the ships a maximum speed of 26.6 knots (49.3 km/h; 30.6 mph) and a range of 2,300 nautical miles (4,300 km; 2,600 mi) at 25 knots (46 km/h; 29 mph) or 4,500 nmi (8,300 km; 5,200 mi) at 15 knots (28 km/h; 17 mph). The ships had a crew of 214. (Note: The numbers vary widely between the sources. Couhat has the length overall at 103.0 m (337 ft 11 in), a length between perpendiculars of 98.0 m (321 ft 6 in), a beam of 11.5 m (37 ft 9 in) and a draught of 3.8 m (12 ft 6 in) Sharpe has the crew numbering 201 including 15 officers. Lyon & Chumbley state that they share the same numbers as the French Commandant Rivière class and had a length overall of 103.0 m, a length between perpendiculars of 98.0 m, a beam of 11.5 m and a draught of 4.3 m (14 ft 1 in).)

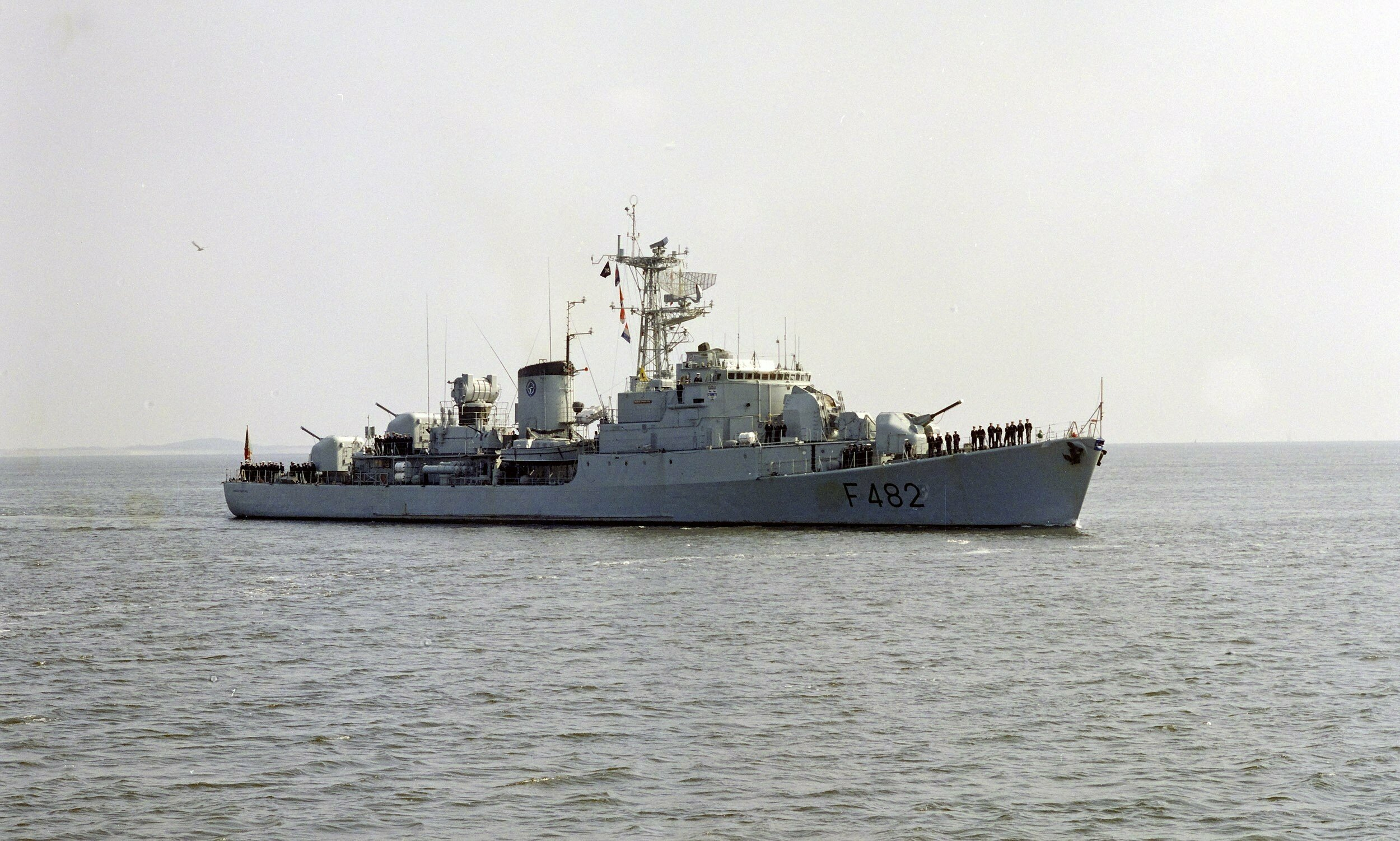
Comandante Roberto Ivens in 1989

The ships initially mounted three Creusot Loire 100-millimetre (3.9 in)/55 calibre Mod 1953 naval guns in single mounts placed on the centreline in positions "A", "X", and "Y". The frigates also sported two Bofors 40 mm (1.6 in)/60 guns in a twin turret situated in the "B" position on the centreline. The 100 mm guns could fire a 13 kilograms (29 lb) shell 9 nmi (17 km; 10 mi) at 80° elevation. The 40 mm guns could fire a 0.89 kg (2.0 lb) shell 6.6 nmi (12.2 km; 7.6 mi) at 90° elevation. For anti-submarine warfare (ASW), the João Belo class were equipped with a single Mortier four-barrelled 305 mm (12.0 in) anti-submarine mortar with a range of 2,700 m (8,900 ft) firing a 227 kg (500 lb) projectile and two triple-mounted 550 mm (22 in) ASW torpedo tubes for LCAN L3 torpedoes.

The João Belo class mounted Thomson-CSF DRBV 22A air search radar operating on the D band, and Thomson-CSF DR8V 50 surface search radar operating on the G band. For fire control radar, they mounted Thomson-CSF DRBC 31D radar operating on the I band and ARBR10 radar warning. For ASW, they had a hull-mounted EDO SQS-17A attack sonar coupled with a Thomson Sintra DU8A 3A search sonar.

=== Modifications ===
In 1989, the frigates had two Loral Hycor Mk 36 SRBOC six-barrelled chaff launchers installed. The frigates underwent significant modernization beginning in 1993. The "X" turret was removed along with the anti-submarine mortar. The João Belos received a new SQS-510 hull-mounted sonar, the AR-700(V2) intercept ESM replaced the ARBR10. The torpedo tubes were upgraded to the US Mk 32 torpedo tubes Mod 5 firing Honeywell Mk 46 torpedoes. Furthermore, they received the SLQ-25 Nixie towed torpedo decoy system. After all the modifications to the ship, the final result were frigates that had a displacement of 2,700 t (2,700 long tons), with a length of 102.7 m (336 ft 11 in), a draught of 11.7 m (38 ft 5 in) and a draught of 4.4 m (14 ft 5 in). The vessels had a maximum speed of 23.5 knots (43.5 km/h; 27.0 mph) and a range of 7,500 nmi (13,900 km; 8,600 mi) at 15 knots (28 km/h; 17 mph). They had a crew of 164 including 15 officers.

== Ships ==
João Belo class construction data
Pennant	Name	Builder	Laid down	Launched	Commissioned	Status
F480	Comandante João Belo	Ateliers et chantiers de Bretagne (ACB) Nantes	6 September 1965	22 March 1966	1 July 1967	Decommissioned in March 2008. Sold to Uruguay on 8 April 2008 and renamed ROU Uruguay. Decommissioned on 12 August 2022.
F481	Comandante Hermenegildo Capelo	Ateliers et chantiers de Bretagne (ACB) Nantes	13 May 1966	29 November 1966	26 April 1968	Decommissioned in 2004. Sunk in 2013 to form an artificial reef in Algarve. "Ocean Revival" program.
F482	Comandante Roberto Ivens	Ateliers et chantiers de Bretagne (ACB) Nantes	13 December 1966	8 August 1967	23 November 1968	Stricken 16 May 2003
F483	Comandante Sacadura Cabral	Ateliers et chantiers de Bretagne (ACB) Nantes	10 August 1967	15 March 1968	25 July 1969	Sold to Uruguay as ROU Comandante Pedro Campbell on 8 April 2008. Decommissioned as of late 2018, used as spare parts for ROU Uruguay. Departed to Turkey for scrapping 1 July 2021.

== Construction and career ==
The four frigates of the class were ordered from the French shipyard Ateliers et chantiers de Bretagne (ACB) Nantes, with construction of the first ship beginning in 1965. Three more ships followed with construction ending in 1968 with the commissioning of the final ship in 1968. Comandante João Belo was the first ship to enter service and was sent on a mission to Bissau in January 1968. This was followed by a nearly year-long overseas deployment which involved monitoring the British blockade of Beira, Mozambique. In 1972, Comandante João Belo was among the Portuguese warships that sailed to Brazil for the nation's 150th anniversary of its independence. In 1974 Comandante Roberto Ivens was among the Portuguese ships that was sent to Luanda as part of decolonization efforts there.

Comandante João Belo deployed to NATO's STANAVFORLANT unit in 1983, 1984 and 1986. Comandante Roberto Ivens was assigned to STANAVFORLANT in 1985, 1989 and 1991. Comandante Hermenegildo Capelo was the first Portuguese warship to incorporate female crew. On 16 May 2003, Comandante Roberto Ivens was stricken from the naval register and cannibalised for spare parts. In 2004, Comandante Hermenegildo Capelo was stricken from service. Comandante Hermenegildo Capelo was chosen as a hull for the "Ocean Revival" program and stripped and decontaminated. The hull was then sunk as an artificial reef in 30 m (98 ft) of water off Portimão, Portugal.

The two remaining frigates in active service of this class were replaced, in 2008, by the Bartolomeu Dias class in the Portuguese Navy. Comandante João Belo was taken out of service in March 2008. Comandante João Belo and Comandante Sacadura Cabral were sold to the Uruguayan Navy in April 2008, becoming, respectively ROU Uruguay and ROU Pedro Campbell. Pedro Campbell was taken out service by Uruguay and cannibalized for parts. The vessel was sold for scrap in 2021. Subsequently, Uruguay was decommissioned on 12 August 2022.

== See also ==
- Portuguese Colonial War
- List of frigate classes by country

=== Equivalent frigates of the same era ===
- Garcia class
- Oslo class
- Leander class
- Bronstein class
- Köln class
- Commandant Rivière class
- Tribal class
