= Commandant Rivière-class frigate =

1958 class of French frigates

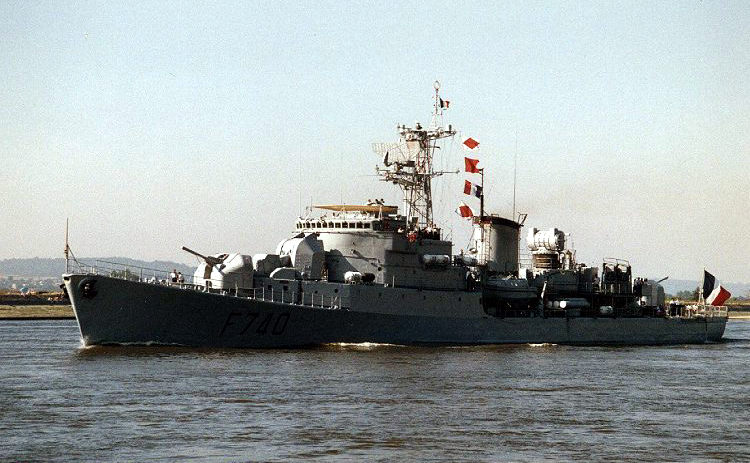
- Escort Commandant Bourdais on the Seine River in July 1989

Class overview
- Name: Commandant Rivière class
- Builders: Arsenal de Lorient
- Operators: Marine Nationale; National Navy of Uruguay
- Preceded by: Le Normand class
- Succeeded by: D'Estienne d'Orves class
- Subclasses: João Belo class
- In commission: 1962–1991
- Completed: 9
- Laid up: 1 (Uruguay)
- Retired: 6

General characteristics
- Type: Frigate
- Displacement: 1,750 tons standard, 2,230 tons full load
- Length: 98.0 m (321 ft 6 in) oa; 103.0 m (337 ft 11 in) pp
- Beam: 11.5 m (37 ft 9 in)
- Draught: 4.3 m (14 ft 1 in)
- Propulsion: 2 shafts (4 × SEMT-Pielstick 12-cylinder diesel engines); 16,000 bhp (12,000 kW)
- Speed: 25 knots (46 km/h; 29 mph)
- Range: 7,500 nmi (13,900 km; 8,600 mi) at 16 knots (30 km/h; 18 mph)
- Boats & landing craft carried: 2 × LCP landing craft
- Complement: 166
- Sensors & processing systems: DRBV22A air search radar; DRBC32C fire control radar; DUBA3 sonar; SQS17 sonar
- Armament: 3 × single 100 mm (4 in) guns - one gun later replaced by 4 MM38 Exocet missiles; 2 × 30 mm guns; 1 × 305 mm (12 in) anti-submarine mortar; 2 × triple 550 mm (22 in) torpedo tubes (6 × L5 torpedoes)

The Commandant Rivière class was a class of frigates built for the French Navy in the late 1950s and early 1960s. Labeled "aviso-escorteur" (fr: "sloop-escort"), they were designed to perform the role of overseas patrol in peacetime and anti-submarine escort in wartime. This vessel class is named after the French Navy officer Henri Rivière (1827–1883).

Four similar ships were built for the Portuguese Navy as the João Belo class.

== Design ==
Side view of a Commandant Rivière-class ship

The main gun armament of the Commandant Rivière class consisted of three of the new French 100-millimetre (3.9 in) guns, with a single turret located forward and two turrets aft. These water-cooled automatic dual-purpose guns could fire a 13.5-kilogram (30 lb) shell at an effective range of 12,000 metres (39,000 ft) against surface targets and 6,000 m (20,000 ft) against aircraft at a rate of 60 rounds per minute. A quadruple 305 mm (12 in) anti-submarine mortar was fitted in 'B' position, aft of the forward gun and in front of the ship's superstructure, capable of firing a 230 kg (510 lb) depth charge to 3,000 m (9,800 ft) or in the shore bombardment role, a 100 kg (220 lb) projectile to 6,000 m (20,000 ft). Two triple torpedo tubes were fitted for anti-submarine torpedoes, while the ship's armament was completed by two 30 mm (1.2 in) Hotchkiss HS-30 cannon. The ships had accommodation for an 80-man commando detachment with two fast landing boats, each capable of landing 25 personnel.

While the previous French frigates of the Le Corse and Le Normand classes were powered by steam turbines, because a long-range was required for the overseas colonial role of the ships, the class was instead fitted with a 16,000-brake-horsepower (12,000 kW) two-shaft diesel powerplant, capable of propelling the ship at a speed of 26 knots (48 km/h; 30 mph), although 26.6 knots (49.3 km/h; 30.6 mph) was reached during trials.

Two ships of the class were fitted with modified power plants. Commandment Bory was powered by free-piston engines driving gas turbines, although it was refitted with a conventional diesel installation in 1974–1975. Balny was fitted with an experimental CODAG (combined diesel and gas) installation, in which a Turbomeca M38 gas turbine (a modified Atar-8 aero-engine downrated from 15,000 bhp (11,000 kW) to 11,500 bhp (8,600 kW)) was combined with two 3,600 bhp (2,700 kW) AGO VI6 diesels for cruising.The gas turbine and the diesels could be clutched together to drive the single shaft, which was fitted with a 3.6m diameter controllable-pitch propeller. The CODAG arrangement took up less space, allowing 100 tons more fuel to be carried and giving a range of 13,000 nautical miles (24,000 km; 15,000 mi) at 10 knots (19 km/h; 12 mph). Balny omitted one 100 mm gun turret to accommodate the revised machinery.

== Operational history ==
The first ship to have been commissioned, but the second in her class, after Commandant Rivière, the prototype and lead ship of the series, was Victor Schœlcher, which entered service in October 1962, with all but one of the class following in the next 27 months. The exception was the CODAG powered Balny, which although launched in 1962 and completed in 1964, did not commission until 1970, being employed as a trials ship in the meantime.

Commandant Bourdais was used for fishery protection in the North Atlantic from 1963 to 1972, while several of the ships of the class were used as training ships, including Victor Schœlcher (1961–1973) and Commandant Bourdais. In the 1970s, all except Balny had one 100 mm turret replaced by four MM 38 Exocet anti-ship missile launchers, while several of the ships had their 30 mm cannon replaced by Bofors 40 mm (1.6 in) guns.

In 1984–1985, Commandant Rivière was converted to a sonar-trials ship. The ship's armament was replaced by a single 40 mm Bofors gun and two 12.7 mm (0.50 in) machine guns, while the ship's stern was rebuilt to accommodate a hoist for a variable depth sonar, which was used to test various active and passive towed array sonars.

All French units were decommissioned in the early 1990s, save for three frigates that were sold to the Uruguayan Navy.

== Ships ==
All French ships were built by Arsenal de Lorient

Pennant	Name	Namesake	Laid down	Launched	Commissioned	Fate
F 733	Commandant Rivière	Henri Rivière	April 1957	11 October 1958	4 December 1962	Trials ship 1986 - decommissioned late 1990s
F 725	Victor Schœlcher	Victor Schœlcher	October 1957	11 October 1958	15 October 1962	Sold to Uruguay 1988 as General Artigas; Decommissioned 27 April 2005.
F 726	Commandant Bory	Victor Bory	May 1958	11 October 1958	5 March 1964	Decommissioned 1 September 1996
F 727	Amiral Charner	Léopold Victor Charner	November 1958	12 March 1960	14 December 1962	Sold to Uruguay 1991 as Montevideo
F 740	Commandant Bourdais	Adrien Bourdais	April 1959	15 April 1961	10 March 1963	Sold to Uruguay 1990 as Uruguay
F 728	Doudart de Lagrée	Ernest Doudart de Lagrée	March 1960	15 April 1961	1 May 1963	Decommissioned 1991
F 729	Balny	Adrien-Paul Balny d'Avricourt	March 1960	17 March 1962	1 February 1970	Decommissioned 1994
F 748	Protet	Auguste Léopold Protet	September 1961	7 December 1962	1 May 1964	Decommissioned 1992
F 749	Enseigne de Vaisseau Henry	Paul Henry	September 1962	14 December 1963	1 January 1965	Decommissioned 1994

== See also ==
- List of Escorteurs of the French Navy
- List of frigate classes by country

Equivalent frigates of the same era

- Garcia class
- Oslo class
- Leander class
- Bronstein class
- João Belo class
- Köln class
- Tribal class
