= Garcia-class frigate =

Class of US Navy frigates

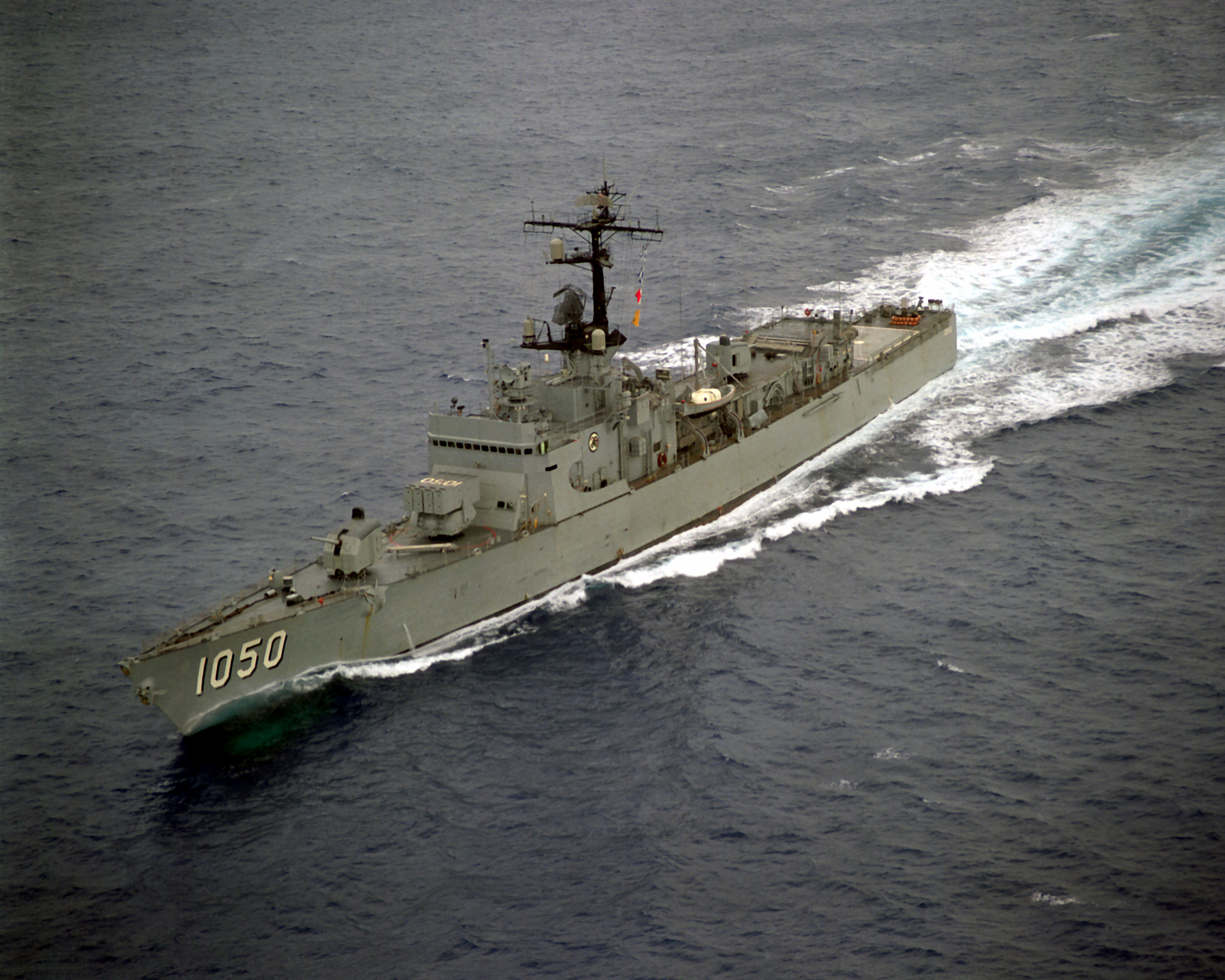
- USS Albert David underway in December 1975.

Class overview
- Name: Garcia class
- Builders: Various
- Operators: United States Navy; Brazilian Navy; Pakistan Navy
- Preceded by: Bronstein class (US); Marcílio Dias class (Brazil)
- Succeeded by: Knox class
- Subclasses: Brooke class
- Built: 1962–1968
- In commission: 1964–1990 (USN)
- Completed: 10 + Glover
- Retired: 10 + Glover

General characteristics
- Type: Frigate
- Displacement: 2,624 tons (light)
- Length: 414 ft 6 in (126.34 m)
- Beam: 44 ft 1 in (13.44 m)
- Draft: 24 ft 6 in (7.47 m)
- Propulsion: 2 Foster-Wheeler boilers, 1 steam turbine, 35,000 shp (26,000 kW), single screw
- Speed: 27 knots (50 km/h; 31 mph)
- Range: 4,000 nmi (7,400 km; 4,600 mi) at 20 knots (37 km/h; 23 mph)
- Complement: 16 officers; 231 enlisted
- Sensors & processing systems: AN/SPS-40 air search radar; AN/SPS-10 surface search radar; AN/SQS-26 bow mounted sonar; Mark 56 fire-control system
- Armament: 2 × single 5 in (127 mm)/38 cal. Mk 30 guns; 1 × 8-tube ASROC Mk16 launcher (16 missiles); 2 × triple 12.75 in (324 mm) Mk 32 torpedo tubes, Mk 46 torpedoes (18 torpedoes); 2 × Mk 25 twin torpedo tubes for Mk 37 torpedo (fixed, stern) (removed later) (8 torpedoes)
- Aircraft carried: Gyrodyne QH-50 (planned) / SH-2 LAMPS

Garcia-class frigates were United States Navy warships. These frigates were originally ocean escorts bearing the hull classification DE until 1975. The ships were commissioned between 1964 and 1968 and decommissioned between 1988 and 1990.

== Description ==
Frigates fulfill a Protection of Shipping (POS) mission as anti-submarine warfare (ASW) combatants for amphibious expeditionary forces, underway replenishment groups and merchant convoys.

The Garcia class was a larger version of the Bronstein class. The Garcias were accompanied by the similar Brooke class, which replaced the aft gun with a Mark 22 missile launcher.

The Bronstein ocean escort was a response to the development of high speed nuclear submarines in the late 1950s, but their speed was insufficient to keep pace with anti-submarine warfare (ASW) groups and their gun (naval artillery) power was poor for general patrol tasks. The Garcia class rectified these issues by becoming the first ships of their type in the US Navy to use pressure fired boilers, which allowed them to generate much more power than the Bronsteins without an increase in size or weight of machinery. The gun armament was increased in the Garcia class to two Mk.30 5 inch/38 caliber guns. The ASW weapon system consisted of the SQS-26BX sonar, Mk.112 ASROC rocket launcher, QH-50 DASH armed drones, and Mk.32 torpedo tubes and was further reinforced with the addition of a pair of Mk.25 torpedo tubes for firing the much longer ranged Mark 37 torpedo.

There were two distinct breeds of ships bearing the DE hull classification, the World War II destroyer escorts (some of which were converted to DERs) and the postwar DE/DEG classes, which were known as ocean escorts despite carrying the same type symbol as the World War II destroyer escorts. All DEs, DEGs, and DERs were reclassified as FFs, FFGs, or FFRs on 30 June 1975 by the United States Navy 1975 ship reclassification.

After decommissioning, Bradley, Davidson, Sample, and Albert David were transferred to the Brazilian Navy, as Pernambuco (D 30), Paraíba (D 28), Paraná (D 29), and Pará (D 27), respectively. Pará (D 27) remained in reserve till 2015, but appears to have been scrapped since. Glover was a Garcia-class frigate modified for research use, commissioned as AGDE-1 in 1965, redesignated AGFF-1 in 1975, and redesignated FF-1098 in 1979.

== Ships ==
Name	Hull no.	Crest	Builder	Commission– decommission	Fate	Link
Garcia	FF-1040		Bethlehem Steel, San Francisco	1964–1989	Sold for scrapping, 29 March 1994	
Bradley	FF-1041		Bethlehem Steel, San Francisco	1965–1988	Sold to Brazil as Pernambuco (D 30), decommissioned 2004, scrapped 2013	
Edward McDonnell	FF-1043		Avondale Shipyard, Louisiana	1965–1988	Sold for scrapping, 21 August 2002	
Brumby	FF-1044		Avondale Shipyard, Louisiana	1965–1989	Sold for scrapping, 9 September 1994	
Davidson	FF-1045		Avondale Shipyard, Louisiana	1965–1988	Sold to Brazil as Paraiba (D28), decommissioned 2002, sank under tow 2005	
Voge	FF-1047		Defoe Shipbuilding Company, Michigan	1966–1989	Sold for scrapping, 19 January 2001	
Sample	FF-1048		Lockheed Shipbuilding and Construction Company, Seattle	1968–1988	1989 to Brazil as Paraná (D 29), sold for scrapping in 2004	
Koelsch	FF-1049		Defoe Shipbuilding Company, Michigan	1967–1989	Sold for scrapping, 9 September 1994	
Albert David	FF-1050		Lockheed Shipbuilding and Construction Company Seattle	1968–1989	1989 to Brazil as Pará (D 27), scrapped 2015	
O'Callahan	FF-1051		Defoe Shipbuilding Company, Michigan	1968–1988	Sold for scrapping, 29 March 1994	
Glover	FF-1098		Bath Iron Works	1965–1990	Sold for scrapping, 15 April 1994	

== Gallery ==
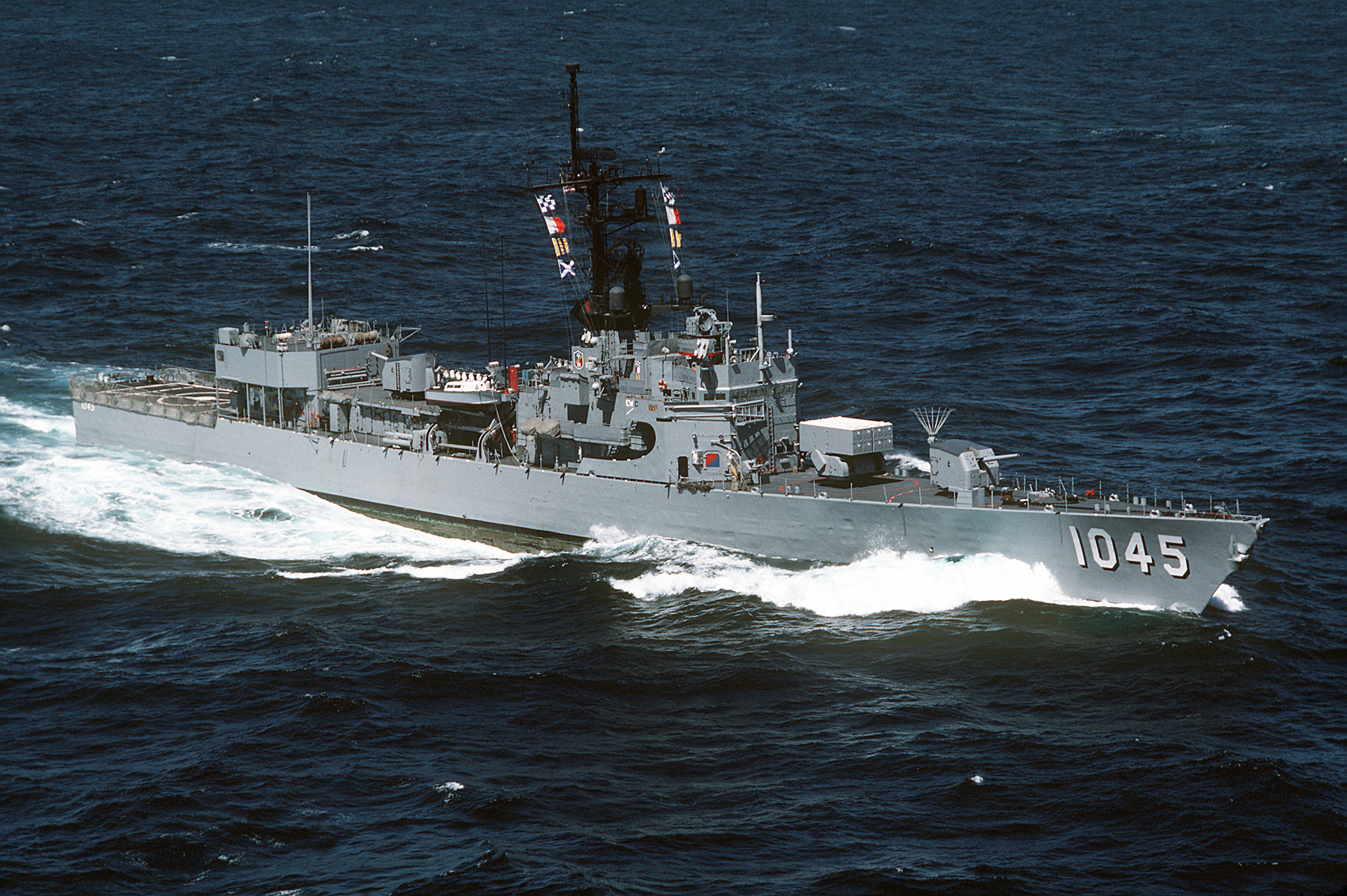
Davidson with vertical bridge structure

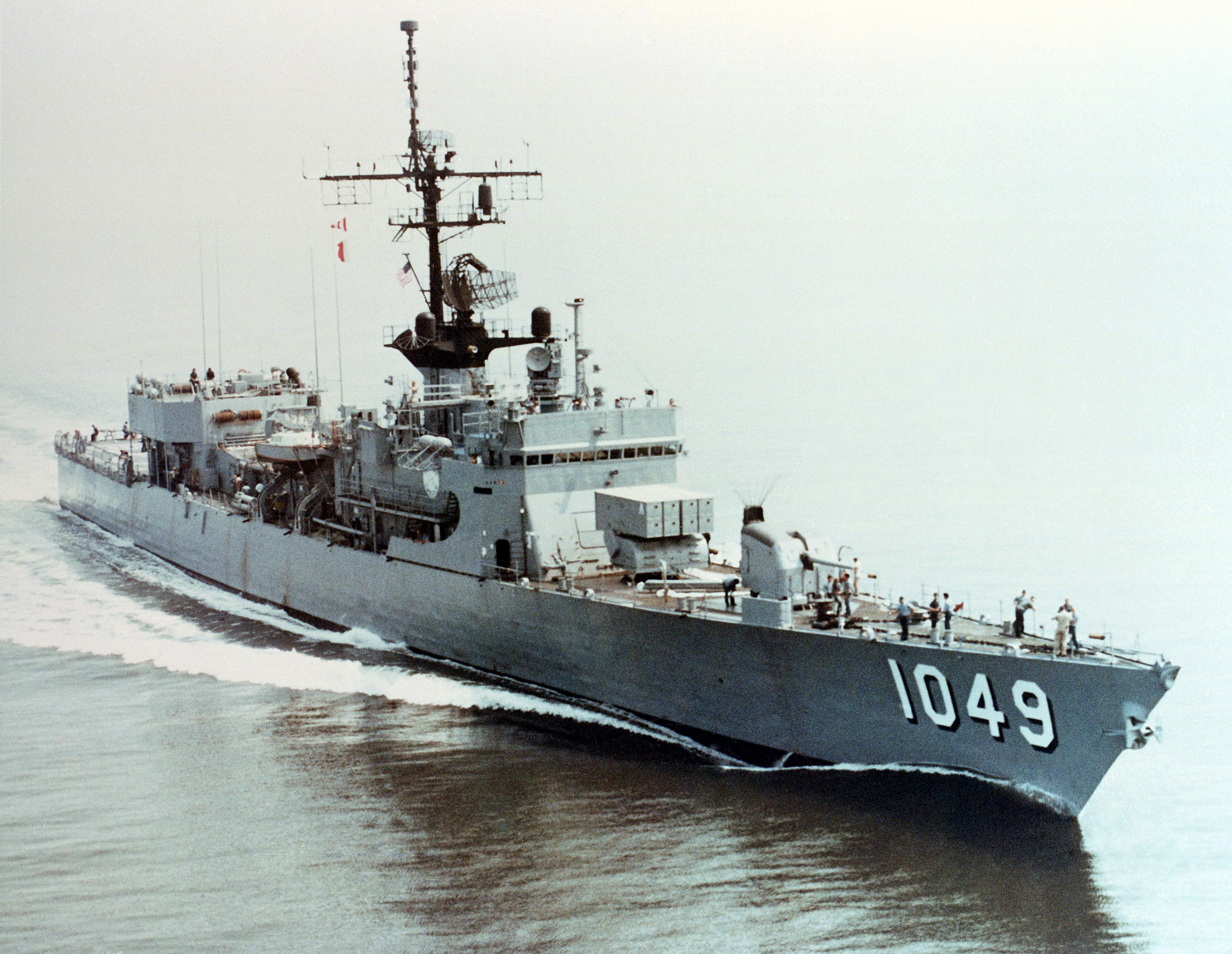
Koelsch with angled lower bridge structure for automatic ASROC loading. All units Voge and later were similarly equipped

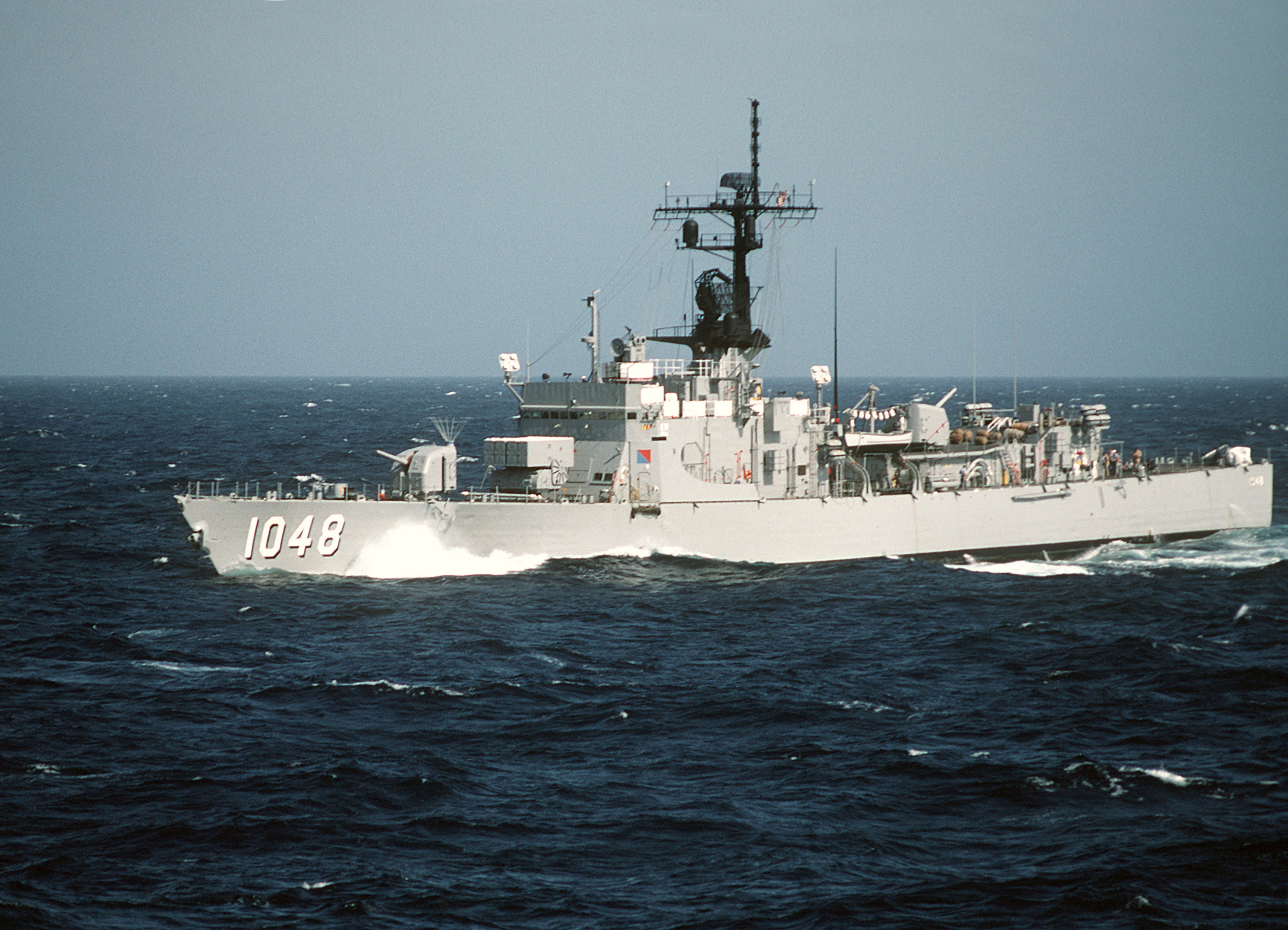
Sample with two gun mounts

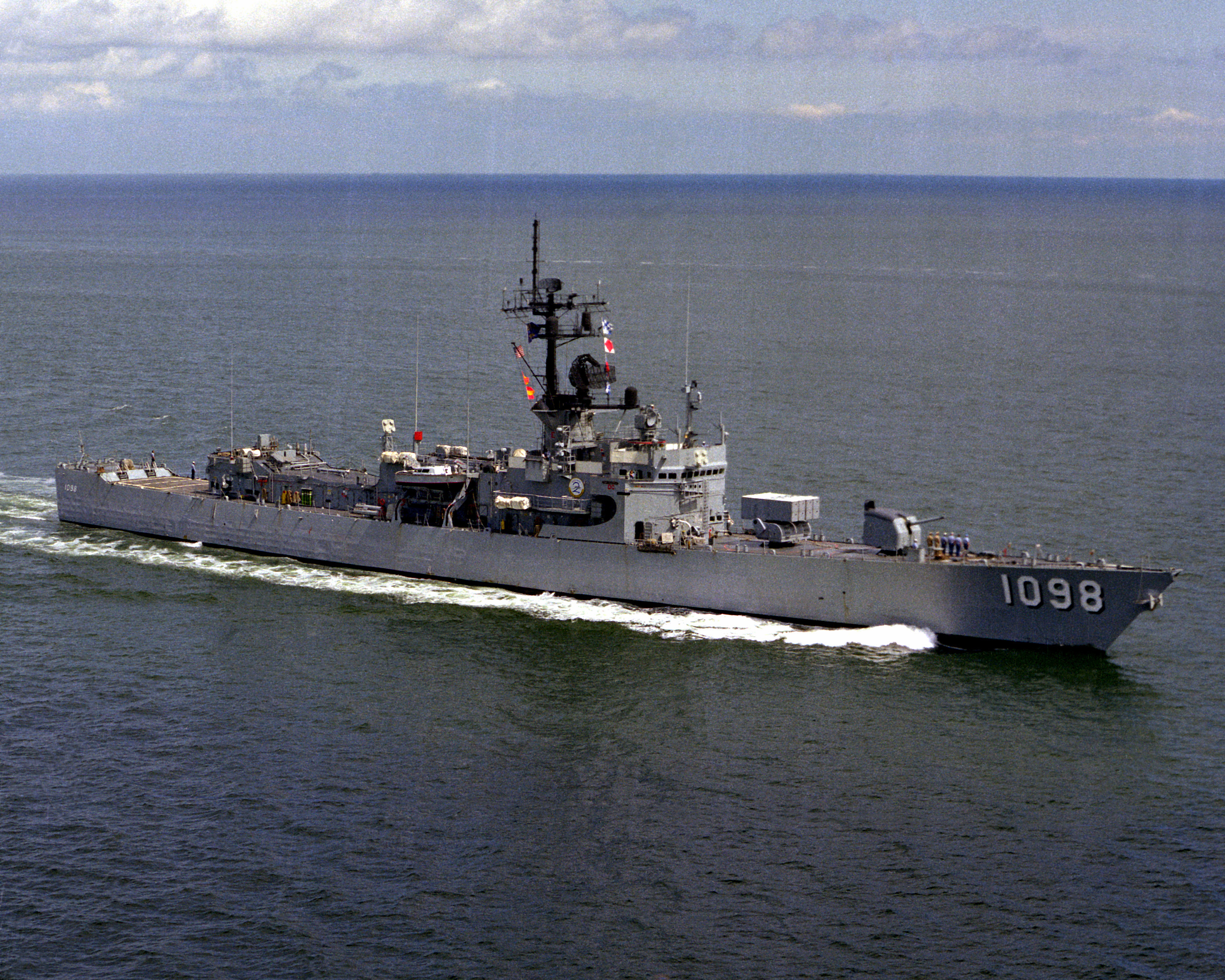
Glover with only one gun mount

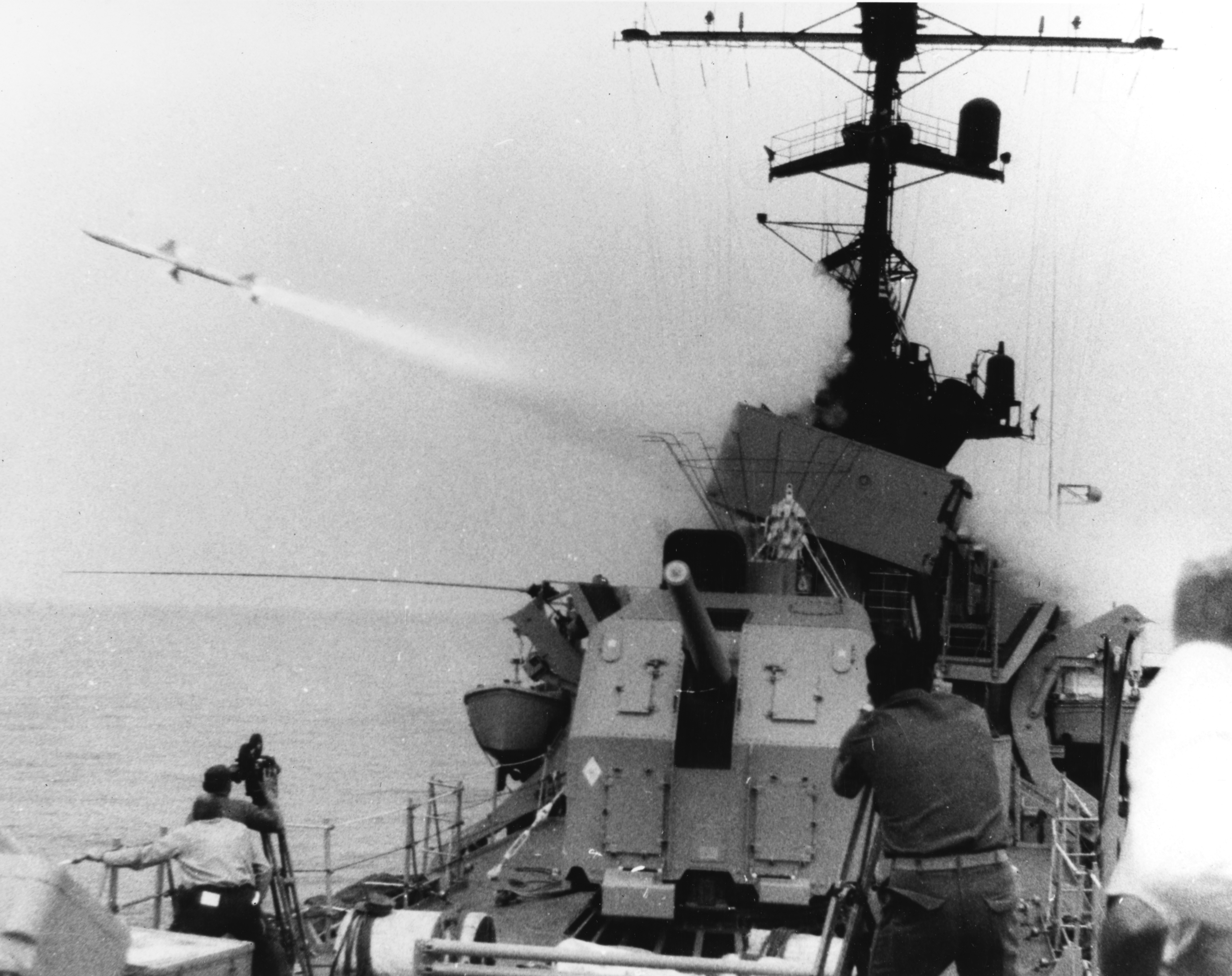
Bradley with RIM-7 Sea Sparrow BPDMS installed. Installed and removed c.1967-1968.

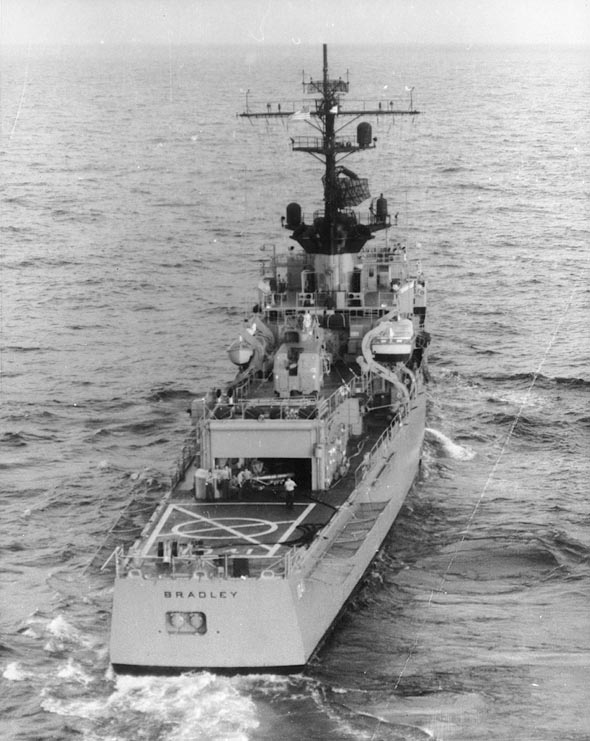
Stern view of Bradley, note torpedo tubes installed in the transom, later removed.

== See also ==
- List of frigates of the United States Navy
- List of frigates by country and by frigate class

Equivalent frigates of the same era

- Oslo class
- Leander class
- Köln class
- Bronstein class
- João Belo class
- Commandant Rivière class
- Tribal class
