= Bronstein-class frigate =

US Navy warship class

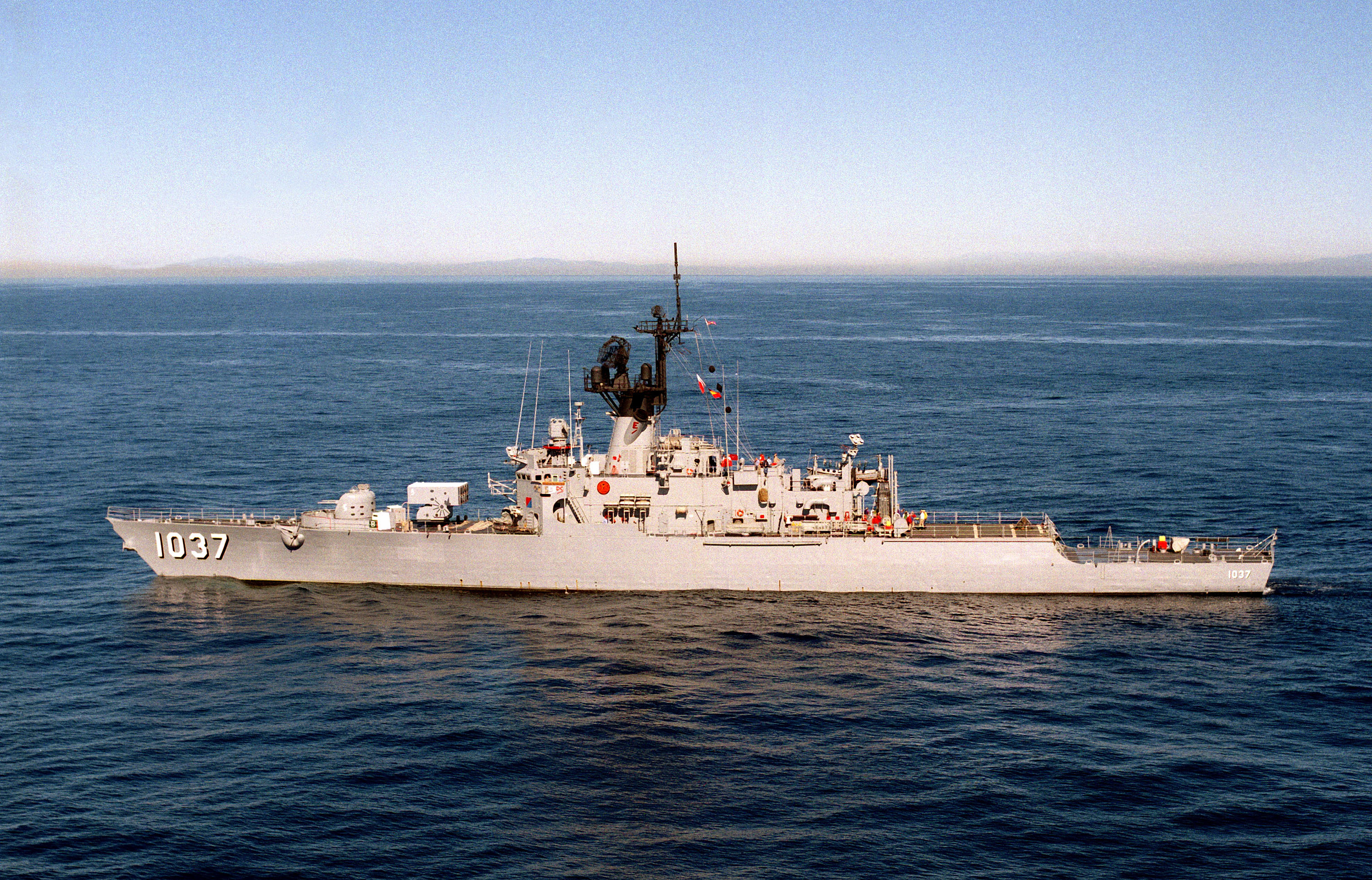
- USS Bronstein in 1986

Class overview
- Name: Bronstein class
- Operators: United States Navy; Mexican Navy
- Preceded by: Claud Jones class
- Succeeded by: Garcia class
- Built: 1961-1963
- In service: 1963-2017
- Completed: 2
- Retired: 2

General characteristics
- Type: Frigate
- Displacement: 2,360 tons standard, 2,960 full load
- Length: 372 ft (113 m)
- Beam: 41 ft (12 m)
- Draught: 23 ft (7.0 m) to bottom of sonar dome
- Propulsion: 2 Foster-Wheeler 600 PSI boilers; 1 Westinghouse turbine coupled to 1 de Laval locked-train double reduction gears; 1 shaft: 22,000 shp (16,000 kW)
- Speed: 26 knots (48 km/h; 30 mph)
- Range: 4,000 mi (6,400 km) at 15 knots (28 km/h; 17 mph)
- Complement: 196 (16 officers, 180 men); Accommodation for 20 officers, 200 men
- Sensors & processing systems: Air search radar: AN/SPS-40; Surface search radar: AN/SPS-10; Fire control radar: AN/SPG-35; Sonar: AN/SQS-26 AX(R) (bow mounted); TASS (Towed Array Sonar System): installed in the mid-1970s for trials but later removed; MK 6 Fanfare torpedo decoy system
- Armament: MK-16 octuple RUR-5 ASROC launcher without reload capability; 6 torpedo tubes (2, MK 32 triple torpedo mounts); 1 twin 3 in (76 mm)/50 caliber MK 33 guns operated by an MK 56 radar director and MK 114 Mod 7 ASW fire-control system using MK 1 target designation system.; 1 3 in (76 mm) gun was replaced by the AN/SQS-15 TASS towed array sonar on McCloy

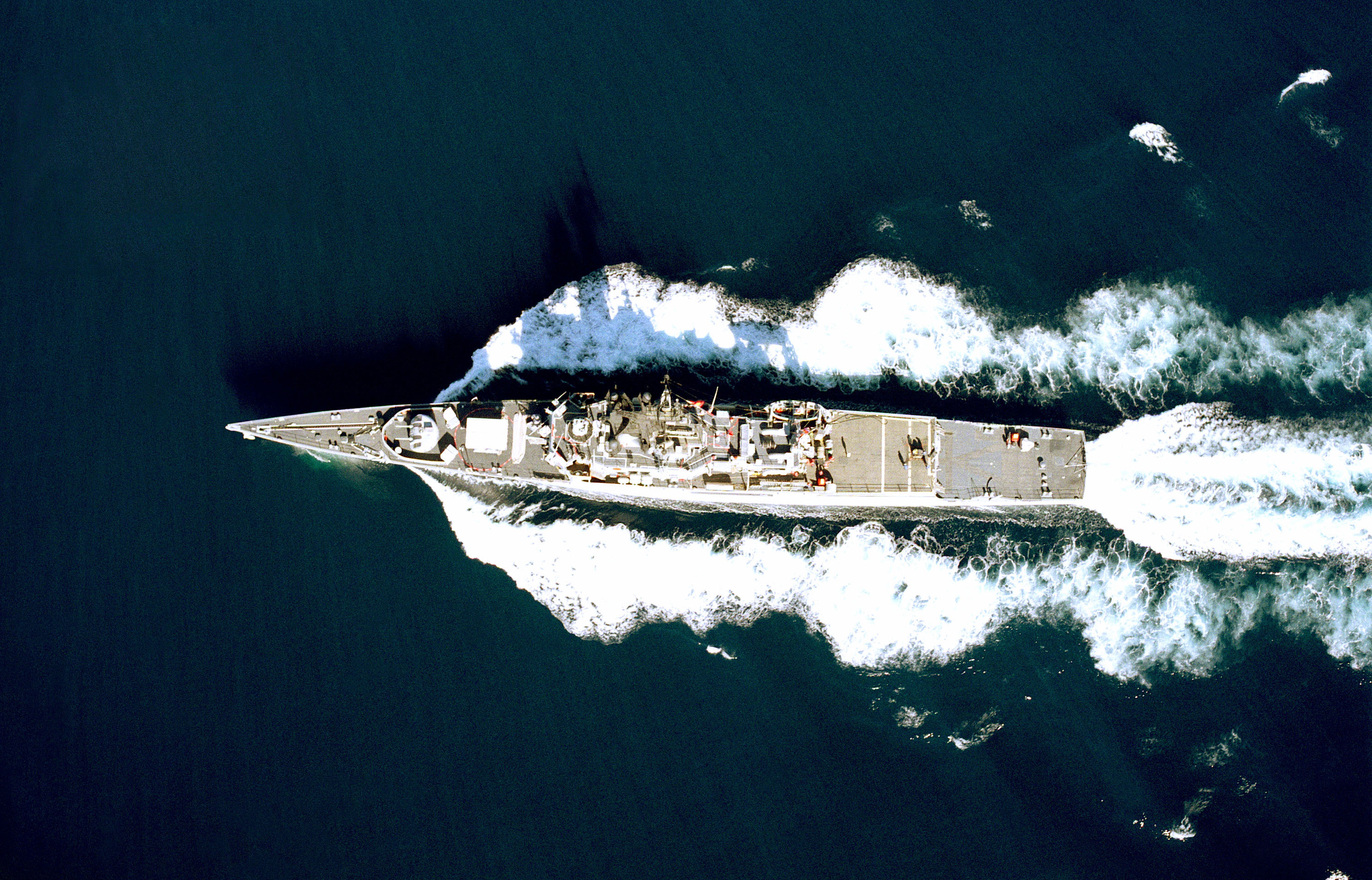
USS Bronstein

The Bronstein-class frigates were United States Navy warships, originally laid down as ocean escorts (formerly called destroyer escorts), but were all redesignated as frigates on 30 June 1975 in the United States Navy 1975 ship reclassification and their hull designation changed from DE to FF.

The lead ship of the class was Bronstein, laid down 16 May 1961 and commissioned 15 June 1963, at Avondale Shipyards, Louisiana. A second and final ship, USS McCloy, was laid down in parallel with Bronstein.

This class comprised the second generation of post-World War II destroyer escorts. These ships can be considered developmental vessels as many new systems were installed to test for future use, such as a new hull design, larger bow-mounted AN/SQS-26AX sonar system, and ASW weaponry. This class was a new design from the keel up, incorporating the FRAM improvements, and was specifically designed to operate the DASH drone helicopter. The sonar was later upgraded to the AN/SQS-26AX(R).

The top weight of the new ASW equipment and the large bow-mounted sonar made the Bronstein frigates too slow to operate with the ASW task forces for which they had been designed. Thus the US Navy decided against any further procurement of ships of this class. The later Garcia-class frigates were given a larger power plant and greater speed.

== Ships ==
Only two ships of this class were built: USS Bronstein (FF-1037) and USS McCloy (FF-1038). Both were later sold to the Mexican Navy.

=== Bronstein ===
- Built by: Avondale Shipyards, Avondale, Louisiana
- Laid down: 16 May 1961
- Launched: 31 March 1962
- Commissioned: 15 June 1963
- Reclassified: As frigate (FF) 30 June 1975
- Operations: US Pacific Fleet
- Decommissioned: 13 December 1990
- Stricken: 13 December 1990
- Sold: To Mexico, 1 October 1993; renamed Hermenegildo Galeana (E-42); later ARM Hermenegildo Galeana (F202)

=== McCloy ===
- Built by: Avondale Shipyards, Avondale, Louisiana
- Laid down: 1 September 1961
- Launched: 9 June 1962
- Commissioned: 21 October 1963
- Reclassified: As frigate (FF) 30 June 1975
- Operations: US Atlantic Fleet
- Decommissioned: 14 December 1990
- Stricken: 17 December 1990
- Sold: To Mexico, 1 October 1993; renamed ARM Nicolas Bravo (E-40); later ARM Nicolas Bravo (F201)

At one time USS McCloy held the record for largest military drug bust at 49.5 tons of marijuana (late 1980s). A sea-going tug was forcefully boarded after an overnight chase while the tug's crew tossed bales of cocaine overboard and weapons fire was released the following morning at dawn. One of the tug's crew was wounded by .50 caliber gunfire and was helo'd off. A Coast Guard detachment estimated the amount and an attempt was made to tow the tug to port. The tug had too much damage and sank in the night after several attempts to salvage her.

McCloy made many drug busts late in her life, received several citations and was painted with marijuana leaves for each bust.

Other notables include involvement in the rescue of the crew of the submarine USS Bonefish. One of the last US Navy diesel submarines, it had a battery compartment fire and was abandoned by her crew off the coast of Florida. McCloy ran lifeguard ops and eventually was designated the tow vessel to bring Bonefish to Charleston, South Carolina.

== See also ==
- List of frigate classes by country

Equivalent frigates of the same era

- Oslo class
- Leander class
- Köln class
- João Belo class
- Commandant Rivière class
- Tribal class
- Garcia class

== Sources ==
- Photo gallery of Bronstein-class frigate at NavSource Naval History
- Class history – Gyrodyne Helicopter Historical Foundation
