= AN/SQS-26 =

US Navy bow-mounted sonar

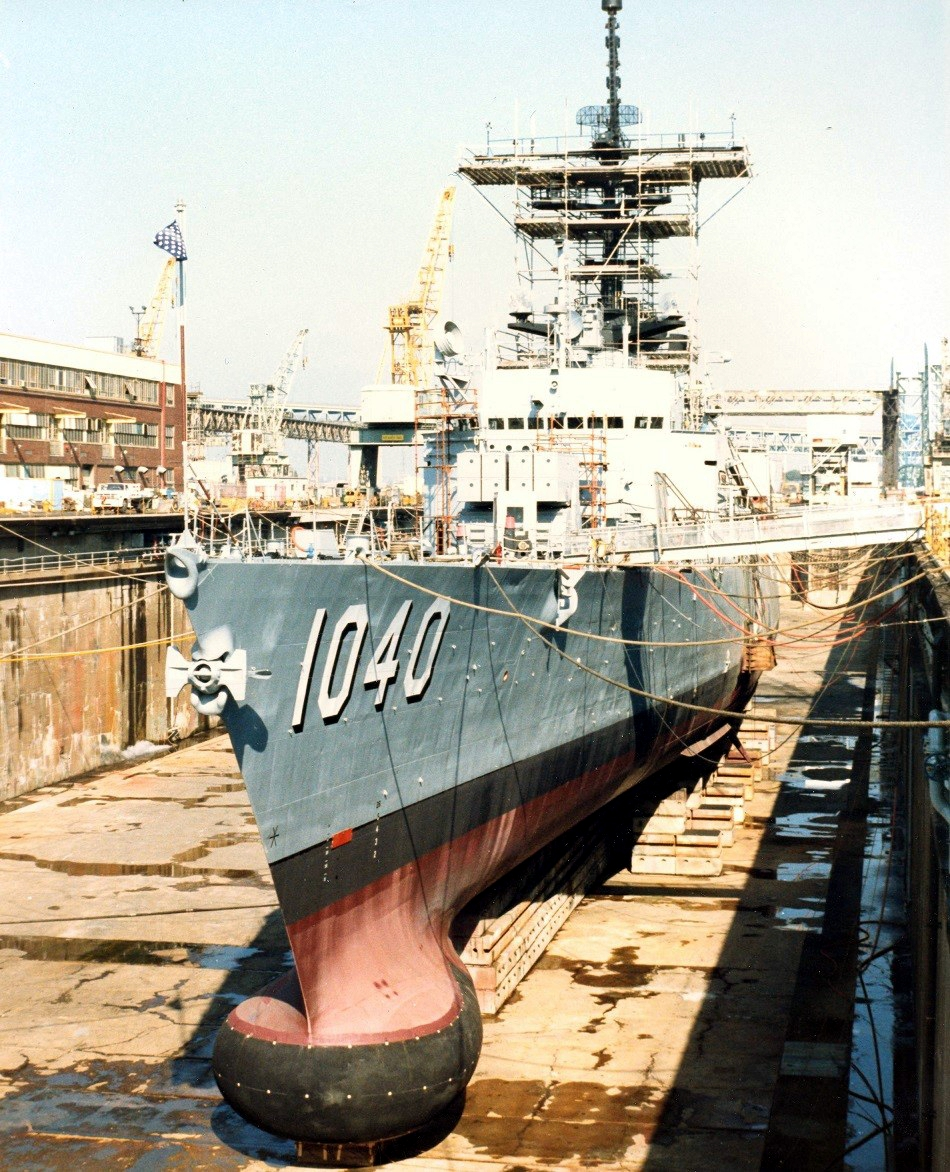
The USS Garcia (FF-1040) is seen with a AN/SQS-26 installed while in dry dock.

AN/SQS-26 was a United States Navy surface ship, bow mounted, low frequency, active/passive sonar developed by the Naval Underwater Sound Laboratory and built by General Electric and the EDO Corporation. At one point, it was installed on 87 US Navy warships from the 1960s to the 1990s and may still be in use on ships transferred to other navies.

In accordance with the Joint Electronics Type Designation System (JETDS), the "AN/SQS-26" designation represents the 26th design of an Army-Navy electronic device for surface ship sonar search system. The JETDS system also now is used to name all Department of Defense electronic systems.

== Capabilities ==
The AN/SQS-26 weighed 27,215 kg (59,999 lb). It could be operated as a passive sonar on the 1.5 kHz frequency or as an active sonar at 3–4 kHz. Its maximum output was 240 kW and it had a range from 18 to 64 km (11 to 40 mi). It had direct path, bottom reflected, passive and convergence zone (CZ) capabilities.

== Variants ==
- AN/SQS-26 AXR - Bronstein-class frigates, FF-1037, 1038
- AN/SQS-26 AXR - Garcia-class frigates, FF-1040, 1041, 1043, 1044, 1045 and FF-1098 (formerly AGFF-1)
- AN/SQS-26 AXR - Brooke-class frigates, FFG-1, 2, 3
- AN/SQS-26 AXR - Belknap-class cruisers, CG-26, 27

The original AX sonars were manufactured by General Electric Heavy Military Electronics. The "R" suffix was the result of a "Retrofit" by GE that incorporated improved designs derived from the AN/SQS-26CX sonar, also manufactured by GE.

- AN/SQS-26 BX - Garcia-class frigates, FF-1047, 1048, 1049, 1050, 1051
- AN/SQS-26 BX - Brooke-class frigates, FFG-4, 5, 6
- AN/SQS-26 BX - Belknap-class cruisers, CG-28, 29, 30, 31, 32, 33, 34
- AN/SQS-26 BX - Truxtun-class cruiser, CGN-35

BX sonars were manufactured by EDO Corporation.

- AN/SQS-26 CX - Knox-class frigates, FF-1052-1097
- AN/SQS-26 CX - California-class cruisers, CGN-36, 37
- AN/SQS-26 CX - Virginia-class cruisers, CGN-38, 39, 40, 41

CX sonars were manufactured by General Electric Heavy Military Electronics. AN/SQS-26CX sonar performs a 360-deg, long-range sector search at low frequency.

=== AN/SQS-53 ===
AN/SQS-53 is an improved version of AN/SQS-26CX. The main difference between the SQS-26CX and SQS-53 sonars is the digital computer interface with the Mk 116 anti-submarine warfare (ASW) weapon control system in the latter. In addition, AN/SQS-53 sonar can be fitted with the Kingfisher small obstacle (mines) avoidance sonar.

Specifications:

- Operating frequency: 3 kHz
- Peak frequency: 192 kHz
- Array height: 1.6 m (5 ft 3 in)
- Array diameter: 4.8 m (15 ft 9 in)

Versions:

- AN/SQS-53A: Original version with analog control and display, used on various destroyers and cruisers. Installed on early Ticonderoga-class cruisers (CG-47 to 55).
- AN/SQS-53B: Original analog control and display in AN-SQS-53A replaced by digital, solid-state controls and displays incorporating built-in test system and AN/UYS-1 acoustic signal processor for integration with the digital AN/SQQ-89 system. Installed on later Ticonderoga-class cruisers (CG-56 to 67) as part of AN/SQQ-89.
- AN/SQS-53C: Improvement of AN/SQS-53B that is 50% smaller in volume and weight with improved reliability: mean time between failure is 2000 hours. New transducers with higher power and wider bandwidth and incorporating AN/UYK-44(V) digital computers in addition to UYK-1. Installed on CG-68 to 73 and Arleigh Burke-class destroyers.

== See also ==
- List of military electronics of the United States
