= Ateliers et Chantiers de Bretagne =

- Company type: Private
- Industry: Shipbuilding
- Headquarters: Nantes, France

Ateliers et Chantiers de Bretagne was a French shipbuilding company of the late 19th and early 20th century, renamed from Établissement de la Brosse et Fouché in 1909. The shipyard often built destroyers for the French Navy.
