= French 100 mm naval gun =

Canon de 100mm
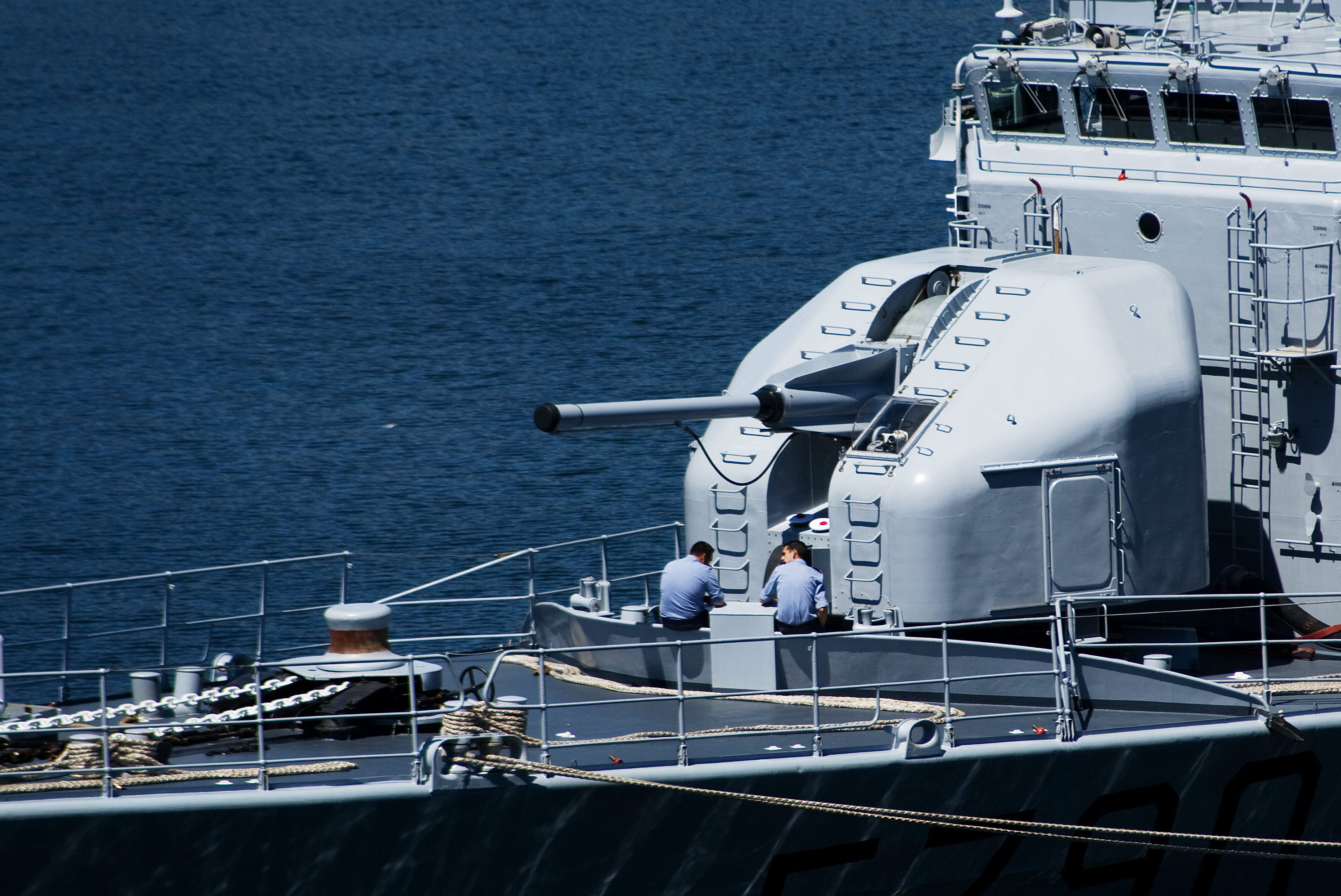
- 100 mm turret on Lieutenant de vaisseau Lavallée
- Type: Naval gun
- Place of origin: France

Service history
- In service: 1958–present
- Used by: France, Belgium, Portugal, Turkey, Argentina, Brazil, Saudi Arabia, Bulgaria, Malaysia
- Wars: Gulf War, Falklands War

Production history
- Designer: Tonnelé
- Designed: 1953–1961
- Manufacturer: Naval Group formerly DCNS
- Produced: 1961–present
- Variants: modèle 53 modèle 64 modèle 68 modèle 100 TR; Compact; Type 210 (China)

Specifications
- Mass: 22 tonnes (49,000 lb) (Compact version: 19 tonnes (42,000 lb))
- Barrel length: 55 calibres 5,500 mm (220 in)
- Crew: 2 (modèle 68); later version entirely automatic
- Shell: 100x700mmR cartridge weight 23.6 kilograms (52 lb)
- Shell weight: 13.5 kilograms (30 lb)
- Calibre: 100 mm (3.9 in)
- Elevation: 29°/s
- Traverse: 40°/s
- Rate of fire: 60, 78 or 90 round/min depending on version
- Muzzle velocity: 870 m/s (2,900 ft/s)
- Effective firing range: 17,000 m (elevation 40°)
- Maximum firing range: Maximum practical range: 6,000 m against aerial targets; 12,000 m against surface targets

Modern French 100 mm naval guns are multipurpose artillery pieces, capable of a high rate of fire, against both aerial and surface targets. Most modern French warships are or were equipped with one of its variants.

== History ==
At the end of the Second World War, the French Navy was equipped with guns of numerous calibres, most of which were obsolete. In 1953, the STCAN of Paris, under engineer Tonnelé, drafted the design of a multi-purpose 100 mm gun. The gun was designed to be effective for anti-aircraft defence, anti-ship combat, and shore bombardment fire support.

The first model of the family, "modèle 53", was tested at sea on the escort Le Brestois in 1958 and the escort aviso Victor Schoelcher in 1961.

== Description ==
The most common version, modèle 68, features a completely automatic action and control. The ammunition is stored in a magazine underneath the turret, and fed to the gun by a lift operated by a team of two. A flexible pipe allows feeding the gun under any orientation.

Rounds of ammunition are fed automatically; after firing, the empty shell casing is ejected through an evacuation door on the front of the turret. Cooling is provided by water circulating in layers of steel around the tube of the gun, and by an injection of air and water after every shot.

The turret can be used in three modes:

- Remote control by the main weapon control system, from the Operation Center
- Remote control from a secondary weapon control system
- Manual control by the joystick at the left of the gun (except the 100TR version)

In manual mode, a team of two serve the turret: the gunner, at the left of the gun, uses a joystick to point the gun, and optic ranging and aiming instruments to direct the fire; the observer monitors the operations from the back of the turret.

Aiming is performed by two electric motors, one for the elevation (left of the turret) and the other for the traverse (right of the turret). Two hydraulic systems feed the gun. The gun can also be moved manually for maintenance.

Since it is usually installed on the bow deck of warships, these turrets are often exposed to breaking waves and humidity. To prevent corrosion and mechanical problems, the turret is made water-tight with rubber joints. The muzzle itself is sealed by a rubber tampion, which can be shot through in case of emergency.

The plexiglas viewbay used to manually aim the gun is usually protected by a steel cover.

== Versions ==
Over the years, the 100 mm turret went through several improvements, notably bringing more reliable operation and increased firing rate, new ammunition optimized to shoot down missiles, and compatibility with modern firing computers. There are four main versions of French 100 mm guns:

- Modèle 53: the first shell had to be fed manually, with subsequent shots taking advantage of recoil to load automatically, firing at up to 60 rounds per minute. Employs electro-mechanical fire control, with two manual command stations on the front of the turret.
- Modèle 64 is a direct offspring of the 53, with a 78 round/min rate of fire. This version can be connected to modern firing computers.
- Modèle 68 In this model, the turret was lightened and can load the first round automatically, but rate of fire is reduced back to 60 rounds per minute. This version may operate with automatic action and control with only one manual station remaining as a backup. This version was later improved to the CADAM standard (CADence AMéliorée, "improved rate of fire"), restoring the 78 rounds/min rate of fire. A derivative is the modèle 100 TR (used on the La Fayette-class frigates), mechanically similar to the 68, but with a stealth armour. The manual control has been removed.
- Compact: This weapon has only been exported to China (see also China's Type 210 100 mm naval gun), Malaysia, Portugal and Saudi Arabia. It is even lighter than the modèle 68, at only 19 metric tons including gunhouse (14 metric ton alone), deck and magazine. Later Mk 2 versions also fire faster, at up to 90 rounds per minute. However, it is also limited to firing short bursts of no more than 6 rounds.

== Usage ==
The 100 mm gun sp has been used in the French navy on most warships equal or greater than avisos (the A69 especially, built and exported in 20 units). The aircraft carrier Charles de Gaulle, with her MBDA Aster-only defence, is the main exception. Also, Horizon CNGF frigates are equipped with the 76 mm Oto-Melara gun.

The 100 mm has been sold abroad, and is used by the navies of Argentina, Belgium, China, Portugal, Turkey, Brazil, Saudi Arabia, Bulgaria, Malaysia & Germany (mounted on Köln-class frigates and Hamburg-class destroyers; both classes are now retired), and others. Belgian Wielingen-class frigates equipped with the system were sold to Bulgaria in 2004-2008.

=== Applications ===
Below is a list of ship classes fitted with the weapon.

Class	Type	Nation	Reference
Jeanne D'arc	Aircraft carrier	France	
Cassard	Destroyer	France	
George Leygues	Destroyer	France	
Suffren	Destroyer	France	
Tourville	Destroyer	France	
Hamburg	Destroyer	West Germany	
Köln	Frigate	West Germany	
Wielingen	Frigate	Belgium Bulgaria	
Commandant Riviere	Frigate	Portugal Uruguay	
D'Estienne d'Orves	Frigate	Argentina France Turkey	
Al Madinah	Frigate	Saudi Arabia	
Florèal	Frigate	France	
La Fayette	Frigate	France	
Almirante Padilla	Frigate	Colombia Malaysia	
Vasco da Gama	Frigate	Portugal	
Baptista de Andrade	Frigate	Portugal	

== Gallery ==
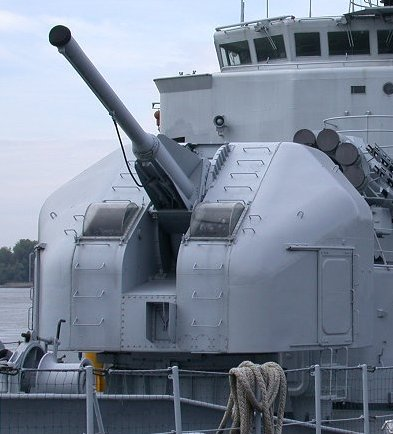
100 mm modèle 53 turret of the destroyer Maillé-Brézé

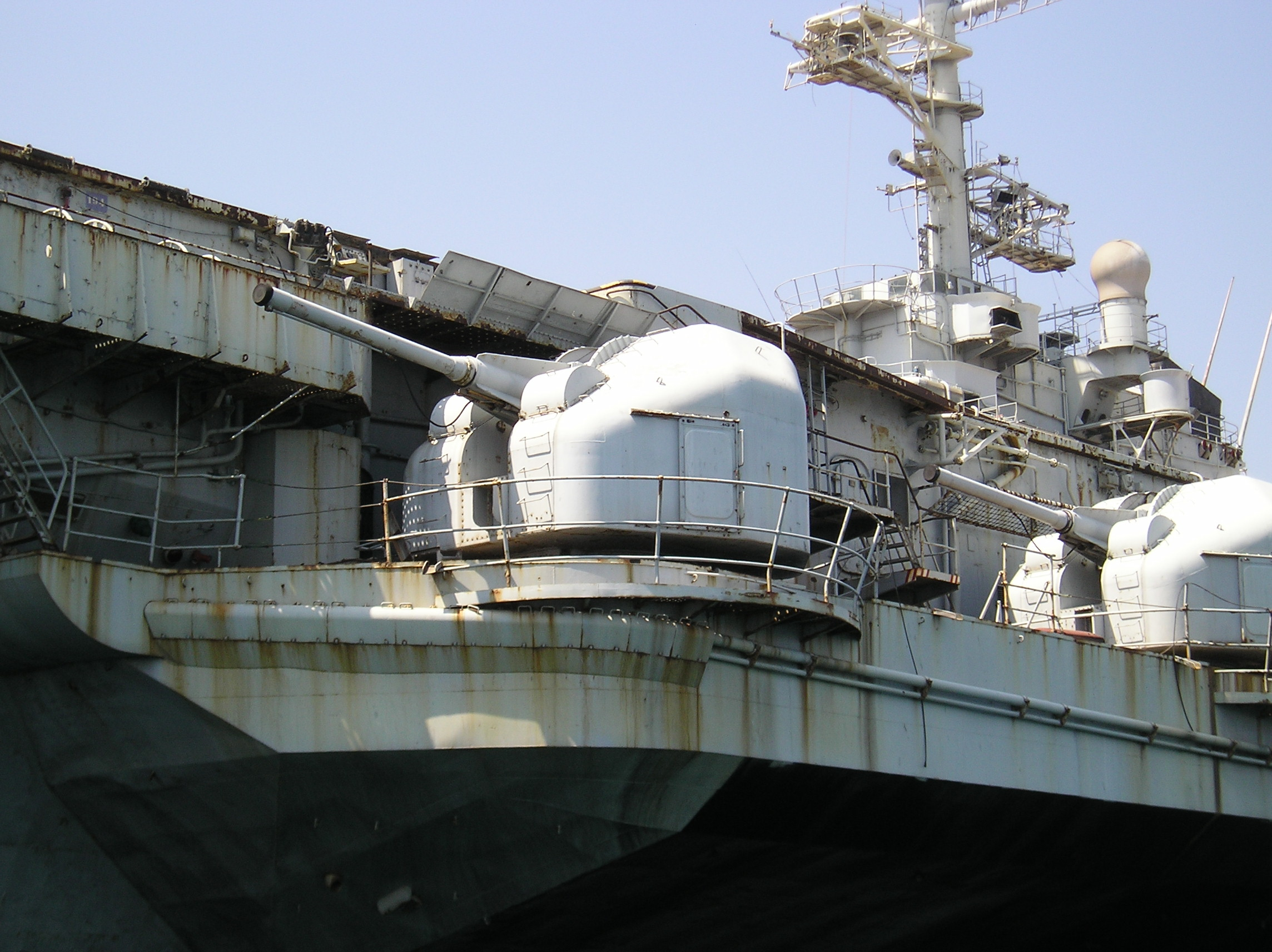
100 mm modèle 64 turret of the aircraft carrier Clemenceau

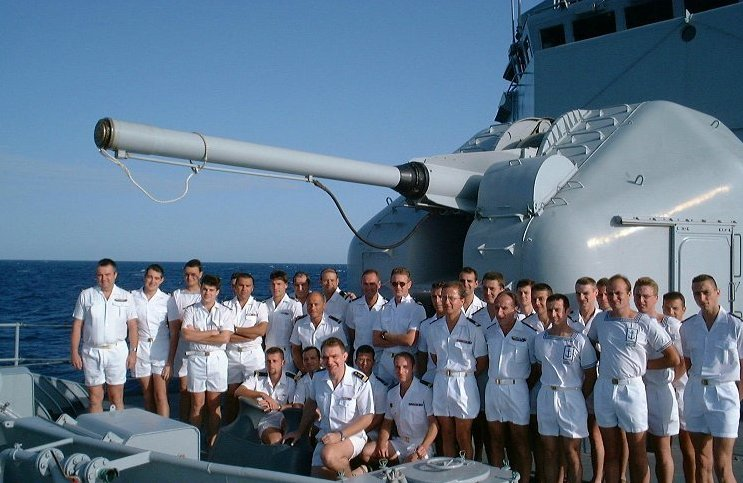
100 mm modèle 68 turret on La Motte-Picquet

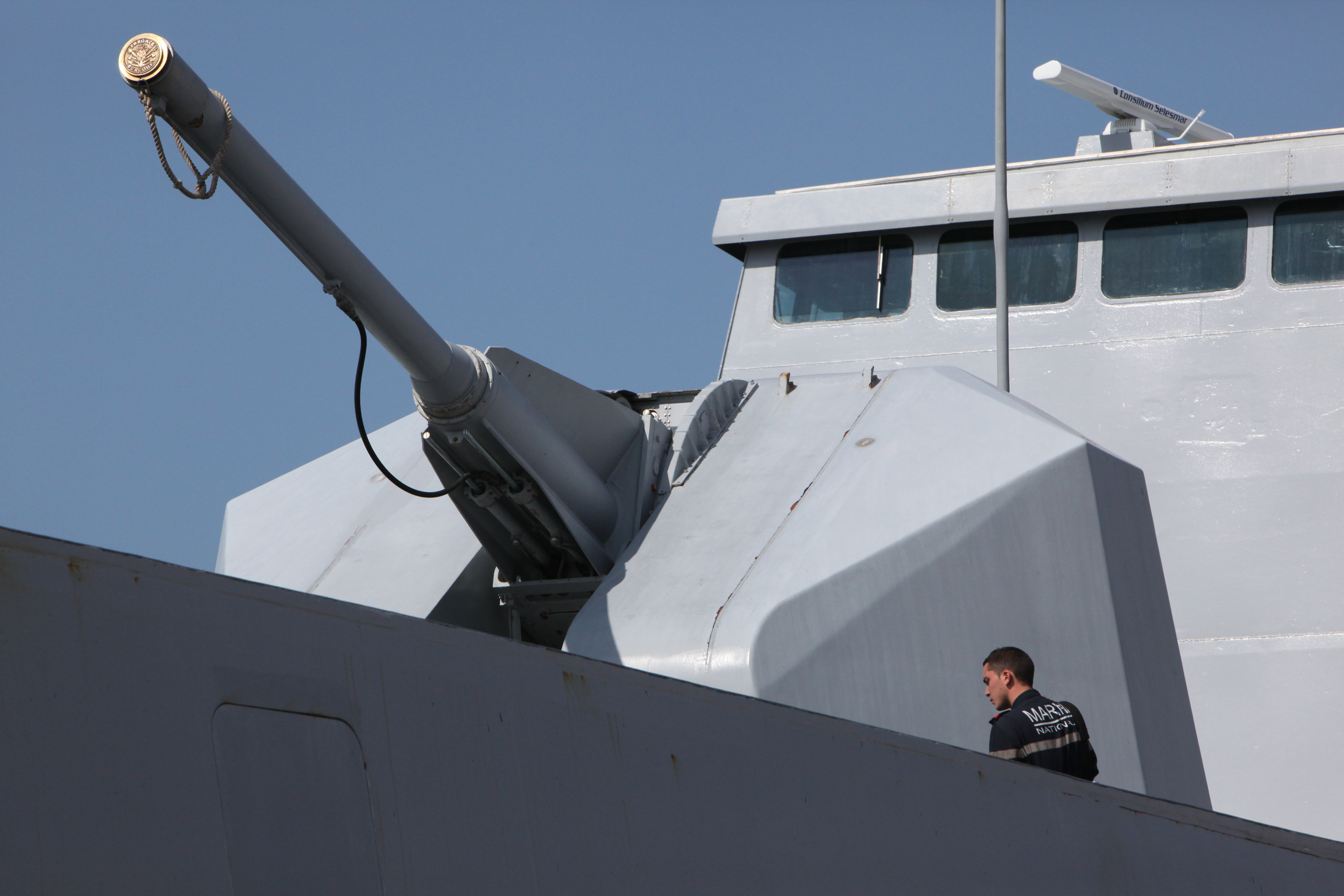
The modèle 100 TR of the La Fayette-class frigate Surcouf

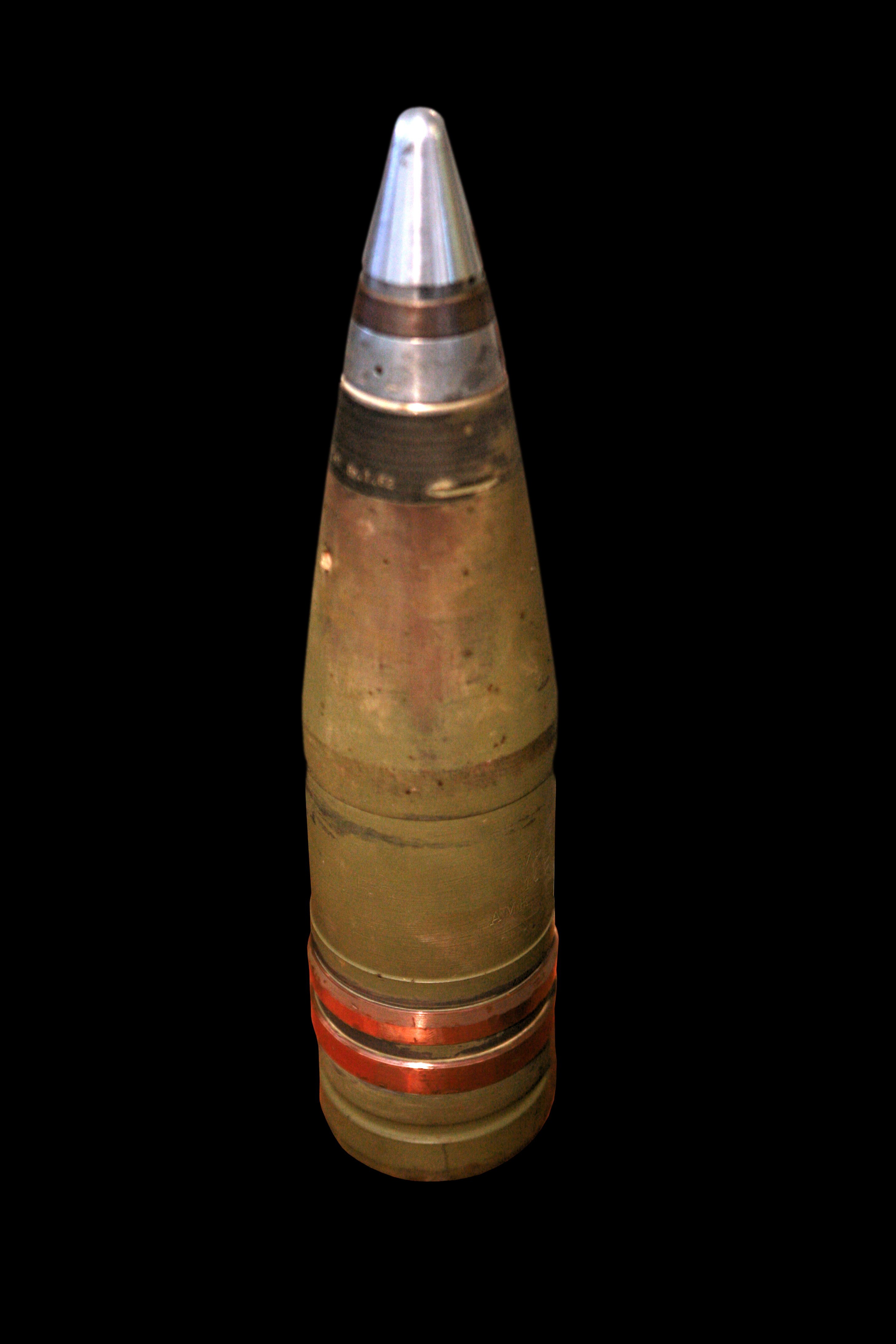
100 mm shell, model 1957

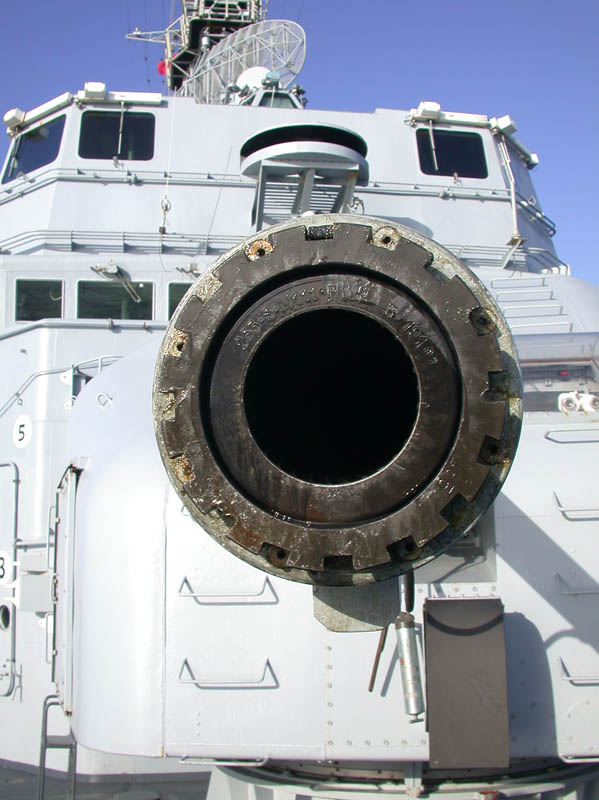

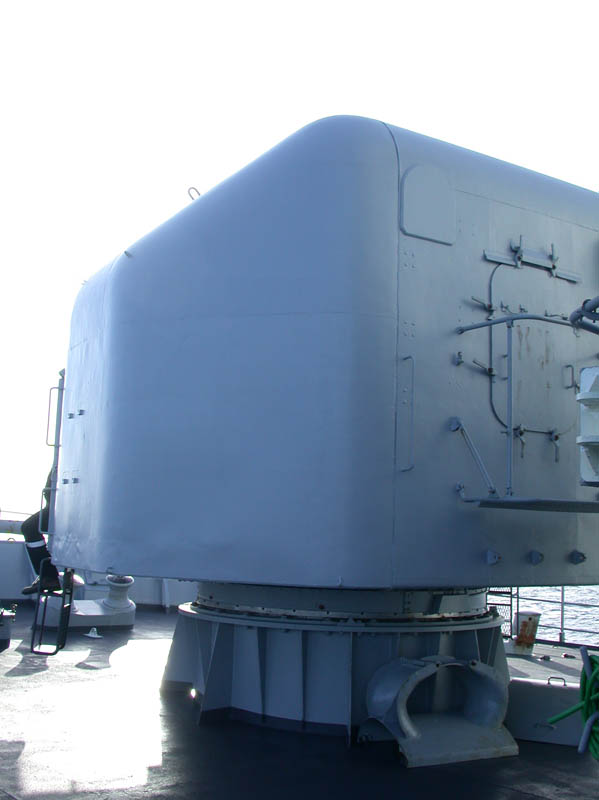

== See also ==
=== Weapons of comparable role, performance and era ===
- 4.5 inch Mark 8 naval gun: contemporary standard naval gun for British ships
- 5"/54 caliber Mark 45 gun: contemporary standard naval gun for US ships
- AK-100: contemporary 100 mm standard naval gun mounting for Russian ships
- Type 210 100 mm naval gun : contemporary 100 mm standard naval gun mounting for Chinese ships
- Otobreda 127/54 Compact and Otobreda 127/64: contemporary 127 mm naval gun from Italian manufacturer Oto Melara

== Bibliography ==
- Friedman, Norman (1989). The Naval Institute Guide to World Naval Weapons Systems. Annapolis, Maryland: Naval Institute Press. ISBN 0-87021-793-3.
