= List of frigates of the United States Navy =

Ships of the United States Navy

Ships in current service
- Current ships

Ships grouped alphabetically
- A–B; C; D–F; G–H; I–K; L; M; N–O; P; Q–R; S; T–V; W–Z

Ships grouped by type
- Aircraft carriers; Airships; Amphibious warfare ships; Auxiliaries; Battlecruisers; Battleships; Cruisers; Destroyers; Destroyer escorts; Destroyer leaders; Escort carriers; Frigates; Hospital ships; Littoral combat ships; Mine warfare vessels; Monitors; Oilers; Patrol vessels; Registered civilian vessels; Sailing frigates; Steam frigates; Steam gunboats; Ships of the line; Sloops of war; Submarines; Torpedo boats; Torpedo retrievers; Unclassified miscellaneous; Yard and district craft

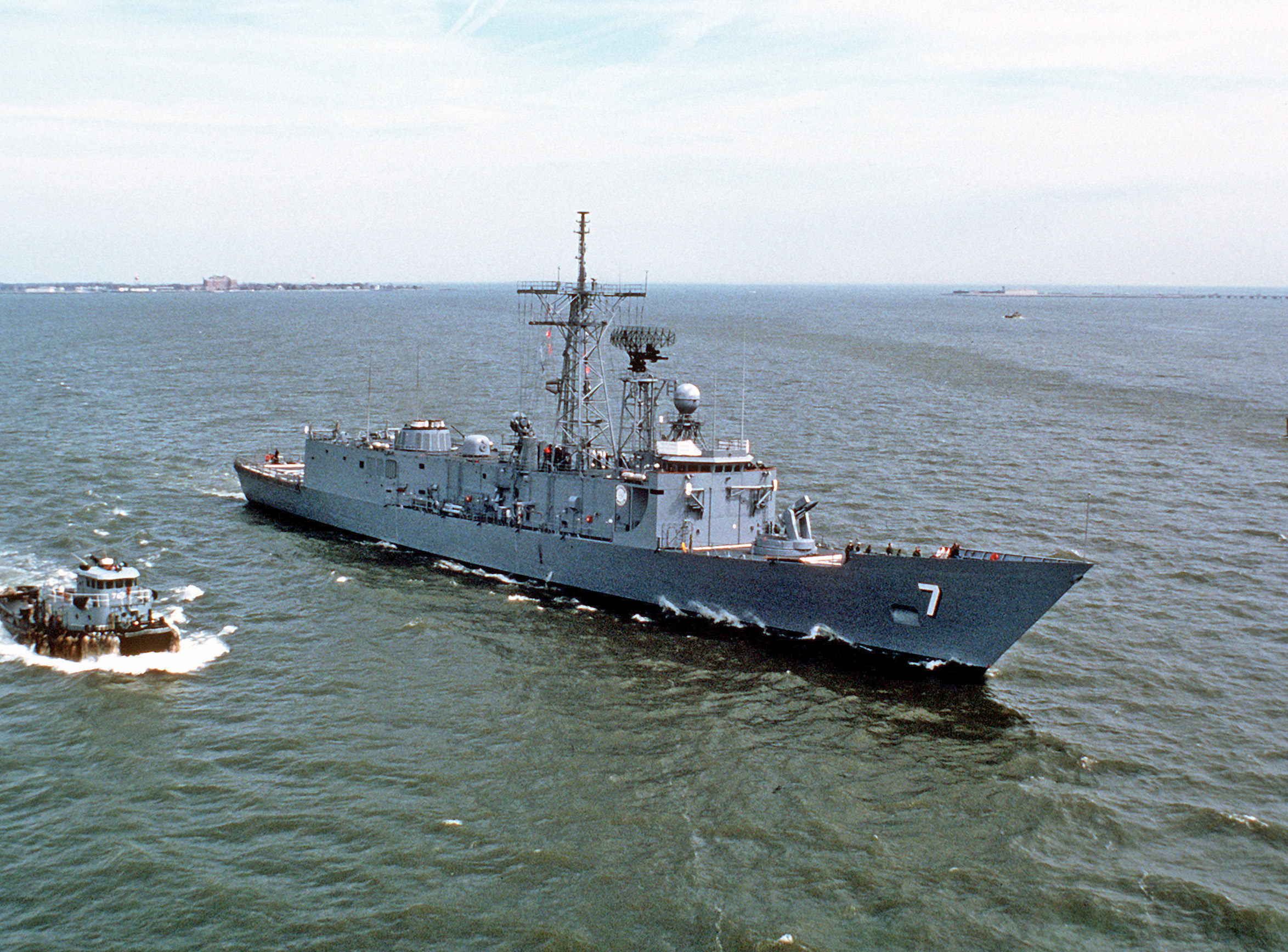
USS Oliver Hazard Perry (FFG-7)

This is a list of frigates of the United States Navy, sorted by hull number. It includes all of the hull classification symbols FF and FFG. Prior to the 1975 ship reclassification, ships that are now classified as FF or FFG were classified as DE or DEG (destroyer escort). The Oliver Hazard Perry class has been retired from active duty in the Navy as of 2015, and use has been replaced by the Littoral Combat Ship, to be augmented by the planned Constellation class guided-missile frigates.

For age-of-sail era frigates, see List of sailing frigates of the United States Navy. For PF (Patrol Frigate) ships, see List of patrol vessels of the United States Navy § Patrol frigate (PF).

== Overview ==
Symbol	Class	In service	Planned	Completed	Cancelled	Active	Laid up	Retired	Preserved	Building	On order	Image	Ref.
FF	Bronstein	1963-1990	2	2	0	0	0	2	0	0	0	USS Bronstein (FF-1037), lead ship of her class	
FF	Garcia	1964-1989	11	11^{[a]}	0	0	0	11^{[a]}	0	0	0	USS Garcia (FF-1040), lead ship of her class	
FFG	Brooke	1966-1989	19	6	13	0	0	6	0	0	0	USS Brooke (FFG-1), lead ship of her class	
FF	Knox	1969-1994^{[b]}	55	46	9	7^{[c]}	0	46^{[b]}	2	0	0	USS Knox (FF-1052), lead ship of her class	
FFG	Oliver Hazard Perry	1977-2015^{[b]}	71	71	0	41^{[d]}	6	51^{[b]}	0	0	0	USS Oliver Hazard Perry (FFG-7), lead ship of her class	
FFG	Constellation	TBA	20	0	18	0	0	0	0	1	1	Rendering of the USS Constellation (FFG-62), to be the lead ship of her class	

== Bronstein-class FF ==
The Bronstein class comprised 2 ships, commissioned in 1963. They were both decommissioned in December 1990, and donated to Mexico in 1993.

Badge	#	Name	Commissioned	Decommissioned	Class	Status
	FF-1037	Bronstein	1963	13 December 1990	Bronstein class	Donated to Mexico, 12 November 1993
	FF-1038	McCloy	1963	14 December 1990	Bronstein class	Donated to Mexico, 12 November 1993

== Garcia-class FF ==
The Garcia class comprised 10 ships, commissioned from 1964 to 1968. The last active duty ship in the US of this class, the USS Voge (FF-1047), was decommissioned in August 1989.

Badge	#	Name	Commissioned	Decommissioned	Class	Status
	FF-1040	Garcia	1964	30 January 1989	Garcia class	Scrapped, 29 March 1994
	FF-1041	Bradley	1965	30 September 1988	Garcia class	Transferred to Brazil
	FF-1043	Edward McDonnell	1965	30 September 1988	Garcia class	Scrapped; dismantling, 21 August 2002
	FF-1044	Brumby	1965	31 March 1989	Garcia class	Disposed of by Navy title transfer to the Maritime Administration, 28 September 1994
	FF-1045	Davidson	1965	8 December 1988	Garcia class	Transferred to Brazil
	FF-1047	Voge	1966	23 August 1989	Garcia class	Scrapped; dismantling 19 January 2001
	FF-1048	Sample	1968	23 September 1988	Garcia class	Leased to Brazil, 1989
	FF-1049	Koelsch	1968	31 May 1989	Garcia class	Scrapped in Hong Kong
	FF-1050	Albert David	1968	28 September 1988	Garcia class	Initially leased, then sold, to Brazil on 24 January 2001
	FF-1051	O'Callahan	1968	20 December 1988	Garcia class	Scrapped in Hong Kong

=== Glover-class AGFF ===
The Glover class, a subclass of the Garcia class, comprised 1 ship, the USS Glover (FF-1098). She was in commission from 1965 to 1990.

Badge	#	Name	Commissioned	Decommissioned	Class	Status
	FF-1098	Glover	1965	15 June 1990	Garcia class	Sold for scrap, 15 April 1994

== Brooke-class FFG ==
The Brooke class comprised 6 ships, commissioned from 1966 to 1968. The last active-duty ship of this class, the USS Julius A. Furer (FFG-6), was decommissioned in January 1989.

Badge	#	Name	Commissioned	Decommissioned	Class	Status
	FFG-1	Brooke	1966	16 September 1988	Brooke class	Disposed of by Navy title transfer to the Maritime Administration, 28 March 1994
	FFG-2	Ramsey	1967	1 September 1988	Brooke class	Sunk as a target, 15 June 2000
	FFG-3	Schofield	1968	8 September 1988	Brooke class	Sunk as a target, 2 November 1999
	FFG-4	Talbot	1967	30 September 1988	Brooke class	Sold for scrap, 9 March 1994
	FFG-5	Richard L. Page	1967	30 September 1988	Brooke class	Disposed of by Navy title transfer to the Maritime Administration, 28 March 1994
	FFG-6	Julius A. Furer	1967	31 January 1989	Brooke class	Disposed of by Navy title transfer to the Maritime Administration, 28 March 1994

== Knox-class FF ==
The Knox class comprised 46 ships, commissioned between 1969 and 1974. The last ship of this class in active US service, the USS Truett (FF-1095), was decommissioned in July 1994.

Badge	#	Name	Commissioned	Decommissioned	Class	Status
	FF-1052	Knox	1969	14 February 1992	Knox class	Sunk as target, 7 August 2007
	FF-1053	Roark	1969	14 December 1991	Knox class	Scrapped in 2004
	FF-1054	Gray	1970	29 June 1991	Knox class	Scrapped, 21 July 2001
	FF-1055	Hepburn	1969	20 December 1991	Knox class	Sunk as target, 4 June 2002
	FF-1056	Connole	1969	30 August 1992	Knox class	Transferred to Greece, 1992
	FF-1057	Rathburne	1970	14 February 1992	Knox class	Sunk as target, 5 July 2002
	FF-1058	Meyerkord	1969	14 December 1991	Knox class	Scrapped beginning on 15 December 2001
	FF-1059	W. S. Sims	1970	6 September 1991	Knox class	Transferred to Turkey for spare parts, 21 December 1999
	FF-1060	Lang	1970	12 December 1991	Knox class	Sold for scrapping, 15 December 2001
	FF-1061	Patterson	1970	30 September 1991	Knox class	Sold for scrapping, late September 1999
	FF-1062	Whipple	1970	14 February 1992	Knox class	Transferred to Mexico as ARM Mina (F-214), 10 April 2002
	FF-1063	Reasoner	1971	28 August 1993	Knox class	Sold to Turkey, renamed Kocatepe
	FF-1064	Lockwood	1970	27 September 1993	Knox class	Disposed of by Recycling, 4 August 2000
	FF-1065	Stein	1972	19 March 1992	Knox class	Donated to Mexico
	FF-1066	Marvin Shields	1971	2 July 1992	Knox class	Donated to Mexico
	FF-1067	Francis Hammond	1970	2 July 1992	Knox class	Disposed of by scrapping, dismantling 31 March 2003
	FF-1068	Vreeland	1970	30 June 1992	Knox class	Transferred to Greece, 30 June 1992
	FF-1069	Bagley	1972	26 September 1991	Knox class	Disposed of by Recycling, 19 September 2000
	FF-1070	Downes	1971	14 February 1992	Knox class	Disposed of in support of Fleet training exercise, 15 August 2003
	FF-1071	Badger	1970	20 December 1991	Knox class	Sunk as a target, 22 July 1998
	FF-1072	Blakely	1970	15 November 1991	Knox class	Scrapped, dismantling, 30 September 2000
	FF-1073	Robert E. Peary	1972	7 August 1992	Knox class	Transferred to Taiwan as Chi Yang (FF-932)
	FF-1074	Harold E. Holt	1971	2 July 1992	Knox class	Disposed of in support of Fleet training exercise, RIMPAC 2002, 10 July 2002
	FF-1075	Trippe	1970	30 July 1992	Knox class	Transferred to Greece, July 1992
	FF-1076	Fanning	1971	31 July 1993	Knox class	Transferred to Turkey on 31 July 1993; renamed Adatepe (F-251); decommissioned 2001
	FF-1077	Ouellet	1970	6 August 1993	Knox class	Transferred to Thailand as Phuttaloetla Naphalai (F-462)
	FF-1078	Joseph Hewes	1971	30 June 1994	Knox class	Transferred to Taiwan as Lan Yang (FF-935)
	FF-1079	Bowen	1971	30 June 1994	Knox class	Transferred to Turkey, 22 February 2002
	FF-1080	Paul	1971	14 August 1992	Knox class	Transferred to Turkey, 9 January 2000
	FF-1081	Aylwin	1971	15 May 1992	Knox class	Transferred to Taiwan, 29 April 1998, as Ni Yang (F-938)
	FF-1082	Elmer Montgomery	1971	30 June 1993	Knox class	Transferred to Turkey, 13 December 1993
	FF-1083	Cook	1971	30 April 1992	Knox class	Transferred to Taiwan, 29 September 1999
	FF-1084	McCandless	1972	6 May 1994	Knox class	Transferred to Turkey, 2 February 2002
	FF-1085	Donald B. Beary	1972	20 May 1994	Knox class	Transferred to Turkey, 2 February 2002
	FF-1086	Brewton	1972	2 July 1992	Knox class	Transferred to Taiwan, 29 September 1999
	FF-1087	Kirk	1972	6 August 1993	Knox class	Transferred to Taiwan, as Fen Yang
	FF-1088	Barbey	1972	20 March 1992	Knox class	Sold to Taiwan in 1999
	FF-1089	Jesse L. Brown	1973	27 July 1994	Knox class	Transferred to Egypt, 27 July 1994
	FF-1090	Ainsworth	1973	27 May 1994	Knox class	Transferred to Turkey, 27 May 1994
	FF-1091	Miller	1973	15 October 1991	Knox class	Sold to Turkey as a hulk (19 July 1999); subsequently sunk as a target in the Turkish Seawolf 2001 naval exercise, June 2001
	FF-1092	Thomas C. Hart	1973	30 August 1993	Knox class	Disposed of through the Security Assistance Program (SAP), transferred to Turkey
	FF-1093	Capodanno	1973	30 July 1993	Knox class	Leased and then sold to Turkey
	FF-1094	Pharris	1974	15 April 1992	Knox class	Donated to Mexico
	FF-1095	Truett	1974	30 July 1994	Knox class	Leased to Royal Thai Navy in 1994 and eventually sold, 9 December 1999
	FF-1096	Valdez	1974	16 December 1991	Knox class	Transferred to Taiwan, renamed Yi Yang (F-939)
	FF-1097	Moinester	1974	28 July 1994	Knox class	Transferred to Egypt, 28 June 1994

== Oliver Hazard Perry-class FFG ==
The Oliver Hazard Perry class comprised 51 ships, commissioned between 1977 and 1989. The last active duty ship in the US of this class, the USS Simpson (FFG-56), was decommissioned in September 2015.

Badge	#	Name	Commissioned	Decommissioned	Class	Status
	FFG-7	Oliver Hazard Perry	1977	20 February 1997	Oliver Hazard Perry class	Scrapped
	FFG-8	McInerney	1979	31 August 2010	Oliver Hazard Perry class	Donated to Pakistani Navy, recommissioned as PNS Alamgir (F-260)
	FFG-9	Wadsworth	1980	28 June 2002	Oliver Hazard Perry class	Transferred to Poland and renamed ORP Generał Tadeusz Kościuszko
	FFG-10	Duncan	1980	17 December 1994	Oliver Hazard Perry class	Disposed of through the Security Assistance Program (SAP)
	FFG-11	Clark	1980	15 March 2000	Oliver Hazard Perry class	Transferred to Poland and renamed ORP Generał Kazimierz Pułaski
	FFG-12	George Philip	1980	15 March 2003	Oliver Hazard Perry class	Stricken, to be disposed
	FFG-13	Samuel Eliot Morison	1981	10 April 2002	Oliver Hazard Perry class	Sold to Turkey, 11 April 2002, renamed TCG Gokova (F-496)
	FFG-14	Sides	1981	28 February 2003	Oliver Hazard Perry class	Sold for scrapping 15 December 2014
	FFG-15	Estocin	1981	3 April 2003	Oliver Hazard Perry class	Disposed of through the Security Assistance Program (SAP)
	FFG-16	Clifton Sprague	1981	2 June 1995	Oliver Hazard Perry class	Disposed of through the Security Assistance Program (SAP)
	FFG-19	John A. Moore	1981	1 September 2000	Oliver Hazard Perry class	Disposed of through the Security Assistance Program (SAP)
	FFG-20	Antrim	1981	8 May 1996	Oliver Hazard Perry class	Disposed of through the Security Assistance Program (SAP)
	FFG-21	Flatley	1981	11 May 1996	Oliver Hazard Perry class	Disposed of through the Security Assistance Program (SAP)
	FFG-22	Fahrion	1982	31 March 1998	Oliver Hazard Perry class	Transferred to Egyptian Navy, 31 March 1998
	FFG-23	Lewis B. Puller	1982	18 September 1998	Oliver Hazard Perry class	Transferred to Egyptian Navy, 18 September 1998
	FFG-24	Jack Williams	1981	13 September 1996	Oliver Hazard Perry class	Transferred to Bahrain, 1996
	FFG-25	Copeland	1982	18 September 1996	Oliver Hazard Perry class	Transferred to Egyptian Navy, 18 September 1996
	FFG-26	Gallery	1981	14 June 1996	Oliver Hazard Perry class	Transferred to Egyptian Navy, 25 September 1996
	FFG-27	Mahlon S. Tisdale	1982	27 September 1996	Oliver Hazard Perry class	Disposed of through the Security Assistance Program (SAP)
	FFG-28	Boone	1982	23 February 2012	Oliver Hazard Perry class	Disposed, sunk as target, 7 September 2022
	FFG-29	Stephen W. Groves	1982	24 February 2012	Oliver Hazard Perry class	Scrapped 2021
	FFG-30	Reid	1983	25 September 1998	Oliver Hazard Perry class	Transferred to Turkey, 1999
	FFG-31	Stark	1982	7 May 1999	Oliver Hazard Perry class	Scrapped – dismantled 21 June 2006
	FFG-32	John L. Hall	1982	9 March 2012	Oliver Hazard Perry class	Arrived to be scrapped, 19 December 2022
	FFG-33	Jarrett	1983	21 April 2011	Oliver Hazard Perry class	Disposed of by scrapping, dismantling, 1 August 2016
	FFG-34	Aubrey Fitch	1982	12 December 1997	Oliver Hazard Perry class	Scrapped, dismantling
	FFG-36	Underwood	1983	15 February 2013	Oliver Hazard Perry class	Towed to be scrapped, dismantled, 27 February 2023
	FFG-37	Crommelin	1983	26 October 2012	Oliver Hazard Perry class	Sunk as target during RIMPAC 2016
	FFG-38	Curts	1983	27 February 2013	Oliver Hazard Perry class	Disposed of as target during Valiant Shield 2020 SINKEX, 19 September 2020
	FFG-39	Doyle	1983	29 July 2011	Oliver Hazard Perry class	Disposed of by scrapping, dismantling, 12 June 2019
	FFG-40	Halyburton	1984	8 September 2014	Oliver Hazard Perry class	
	FFG-41	McClusky	1983	14 January 2015	Oliver Hazard Perry class	Disposed of as target during RIMPAC 2018 SINKEX, 19 July 2018
	FFG-42	Klakring	1983	22 March 2013	Oliver Hazard Perry class	Sunk as target during Exercise Atlantic Thunder 20 September 2026
	FFG-43	Thach	1983	1 November 2013	Oliver Hazard Perry class	Sunk as target during RIMPAC 2016
	FFG-45	De Wert	1983	4 April 2014	Oliver Hazard Perry class	
	FFG-46	Rentz	1984	23 May 2014	Oliver Hazard Perry class	Disposed of as target during Valiant Shield 2016 SINKEX, 13 September 2016
	FFG-47	Nicholas	1984	17 March 2014	Oliver Hazard Perry class	Disposed of by scrapping, dismantling, 28 February 2023
	FFG-48	Vandegrift	1984	19 February 2015	Oliver Hazard Perry class	Disposed of as target during Valiant Shield 2022 SINKEX, 17 June 2022
	FFG-49	Robert G. Bradley	1984	28 March 2014	Oliver Hazard Perry class	Transferred to Royal Bahrain Naval Force in 2022.
	FFG-50	Taylor	1984	8 May 2015	Oliver Hazard Perry class	Transferred to Taiwan as ROCS Ming-chuan (PFG-1112), 9 March 2016
	FFG-51	Gary	1984	23 July 2015	Oliver Hazard Perry class	Transferred to Taiwan as ROCS Feng Jia (PFG-1115), 9 March 2016
	FFG-52	Carr	1985	13 March 2013	Oliver Hazard Perry class	
	FFG-53	Hawes	1985	10 December 2010	Oliver Hazard Perry class	Recycled by 2021
	FFG-54	Ford	1985	31 October 2013	Oliver Hazard Perry class	Disposed of as target during Pacific Griffin 2019 SINKEX, 1 October 2019
	FFG-55	Elrod	1985	30 January 2015	Oliver Hazard Perry class	
	FFG-56	Simpson	1985	29 September 2015	Oliver Hazard Perry class	Disposed as a target during UNITAS 2025 SINKEX, September 28, 2025
	FFG-57	Reuben James	1986	18 July 2013	Oliver Hazard Perry class	Sunk as a target 18 January 2016
	FFG-58	Samuel B. Roberts	1986	22 May 2015	Oliver Hazard Perry class	Disposed of by scrapping, dismantling by 2022
	FFG-59	Kauffman	1987	18 September 2015	Oliver Hazard Perry class	
	FFG-60	Rodney M. Davis	1987	23 January 2015	Oliver Hazard Perry class	Disposed of as target during RIMPAC 2022 SINKEX, 12 July 2022
	FFG-61	Ingraham	1989	12 November 2014	Oliver Hazard Perry class	Disposed of as target during LSE 21 SINKEX, 15 August 2021

== Constellation-class FFG ==
The Constellation class was planned to be 20 ships with all but two cancelled as of 2025.

Badge	#	Name	Commissioned	Class	Status
	FFG-62	Constellation	planned for 2026	Constellation	Under construction
	FFG-63	Congress	tba	Constellation	Awarded
—	FFG-64	Chesapeake	cancelled	Constellation	Cancelled
—	FFG-65	Lafayette	cancelled	Constellation	Cancelled
—	FFG-66	Hamilton	cancelled	Constellation	Cancelled
—	FFG-67	Galvez	cancelled	Constellation	Cancelled
—	FFG-68	Everett Alvarez Jr.	cancelled	Constellation	Cancelled
—	FFG-69	Hancock	cancelled	Constellation	Cancelled

== FF(X) program ==
FF(X) is a program to develop a frigate from the Coast Guard's Legend-class cutter. The class is planned to comprise 50-65 ships.

== See also ==
- List of current ships of the United States Navy
- List of frigate classes
- List of frigate classes by country
- List of frigate classes of the Royal Navy
- List of United States Navy ships

== Notes ==
1. ^ ^{1} ^{2} 10 + Glover, a ship of its own subclass
2. ^ ^{1} ^{2} ^{3} ^{4} (USN); some were transferred to other countries where they are in active service
3. In other countries:
  - 2 (Egypt)
  - 5 (Taiwan)
4. In other countries:
  - 8 (Turkey)
  - 4 (Egypt)
  - 2 (Poland)
  - 1 (Pakistan)
  - 6 (Spain)
  - 10 (Taiwan)
  - 2 (Bahrain)
  - 2 (Chile)
