= Rathbun =

The name Rathbun may refer to the following people, places or vessels:

- Benjamin Rathbun (1790–1873), American entrepreneur
- Bob Rathbun (born 1954), American sportscaster
- Helen R. Rathbun (1870–1944), American artist
- John Rathbun (1746–1782), American sailor
- Kent Rathbun (born 1961), American chef
- Kevin Rathbun, American chef
- Mark "Marty" Rathbun (born 1957), former Scientology executive
- Mary J. Rathbun (1860–1943), American zoologist
- Nathaniel Rathbun (born 1992), American electronic music producer and DJ known under his stage name Audien
- Richard Rathbun (1852–1918), American biologist and Smithsonian administrator
- USS Rathburne, two ships named after John Rathbun
- Rathbun, Iowa, a small town in the United States

== See also ==
- Rathburn, with an "r"
