= USS Rathburne =

Two ships of the United States Navy have borne the name USS Rathburne, named in honor of the John Rathbun, one of the first officers of the Continental Navy. "Rathburne" is an incorrect spelling of the name Rathbun, which has also been spelled Rathbourne, Rathburn, or Rathbon.

- USS Rathburne (DD-113), was a Wickes-class destroyer, launched in 1917 and struck in 1945.
- USS Rathburne (DE-1057), was a Knox-class frigate, launched in 1969, struck in 1995 and sunk by BAP Montero's guns in a SINKEX event during RIMPAC 2002. Originally classified as a destroyer escort, DE-1057, she was reclassified as a frigate in 1975.
