= Naval Station Everett =

Military installation in Washington, US

- Everett, Washington in the United States
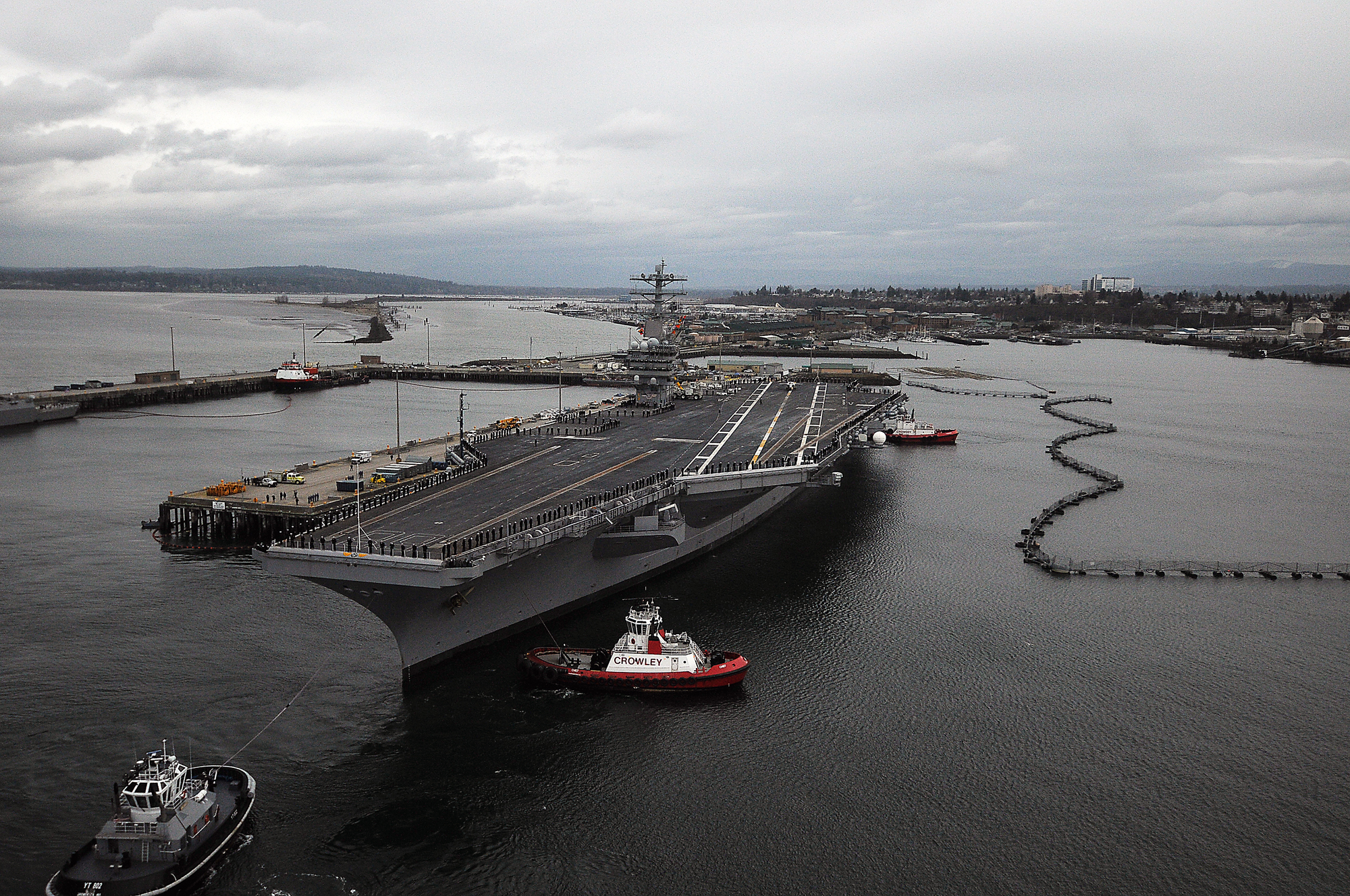
- US Navy aircraft carrier USS Nimitz arrives at Naval Station Everett during 2012

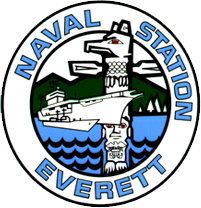

Site information
- Type: Naval base
- Owner: Department of Defense
- Operator: US Navy
- Controlled by: Navy Region Northwest
- Condition: Operational
- Website: Official website

Location
- Coordinates: 47°59′33.54″N 122°13′5.79″W

Site history
- Built: 1987–1994
- In use: 1992 – present

Garrison information
- Current commander: Captain Joshua Manzel

Naval Station Everett (NAVSTA Everett) is a military installation located in the city of Everett, Washington, 29 miles (47 km) north of Seattle. The naval station, located on the city's waterfront on the northeastern end of Puget Sound, was designed as a homeport for a US Navy carrier strike group and opened in 1994. A separate Navy Support Complex is located in Smokey Point, 11 miles (18 km) north of Everett near Marysville, and houses a commissary, Navy Exchange, a college and other services.

NAVSTA Everett is home to seven guided-missile destroyers, a Coast Guard Keeper-class cutter USCGC Henry Blake, and a USCG Marine Protector-class patrol boat, USCGC Blue Shark. There are about 6,000 sailors and civil service persons assigned to commands located at Naval Station Everett. The Naval Station itself has about 350 sailors and civilians assigned.

== History ==
=== Background ===
Although a Naval Reservation existed previously at the site, the history of Naval Station Everett began in 1983 when Secretary of the Navy John Lehman first proposed a new Puget Sound-area naval base as part of the Strategic Homeport concept. In the early 1980s, Congress approved the strategic homeporting initiative to build additional bases and disperse the fleet from the main concentration areas. The strategic homeport program enjoyed the support of not only of the House and Senate but of the Reagan Administration and the Department of Defense. It was decided in 1985 that the strategic homeport program was the best method for implementing the militarily-sound principles of dispersal, battlegroup integrity, and increasing the naval presence in the geographic flanks.

=== Planning and construction ===
On April 17, 1984, Everett was selected from among 13 ports as the ideal location for the new homeport, ahead of a site near the Port of Seattle. The decision to build the base in Everett was opposed by local residents and the longshoreman's union, and an advisory ballot measure on whether to accept the base was held in the city on November 6, 1984. Voters approved the construction of the naval base by a margin of more than 2 to 1. Congress approved $43.5 million in funds for construction of the homeport on October 2, 1986, amid the removal of the homeport program from the federal budget and increases in the base's estimated cost.

The Port of Everett Commission approved the sale of 143 acres (58 ha) to build the base on May 5, 1987, and the official ground breaking ceremony was November 9, 1987. Despite the groundbreaking, the Navy was unable to secure dredging permits until the following week due to opposition from environmentalist groups, who unsuccessfully appealed in court to halt construction. On September 9, 1988, the Navy awarded the $56 million construction contract for the carrier pier, which is 1,620 feet (490 m) long and 120 feet (37 m) wide. On June 4, 1992, three Navy ships participated in the formal opening of the new $56.4 million pier.

On June 26, 1993, the Base Realignment and Closure Commission voted unanimously to retain the planned Everett homeport and close the Naval Air Station Alameda in California. In January 1994, Naval Station Puget Sound personnel began transitioning to the new Fleet Support and Administration buildings and officially began operations at Naval Station Everett. On April 8, 1994, an official dedication ceremony was conducted with over 1,500 guests in attendance.

=== Ship assignments ===
On September 3, 1994, USS Ingraham and Ford arrived as the first of seven ships to be assigned here, welcomed by a celebration from the city. On November 22, 1995, Paul F. Foster arrived at the naval station. On that same date, the Navy officially announced the assignment of David R. Ray, Callaghan, and Chandler to Naval Station Everett. David R. Ray arrived July 29, 1996, and Callaghan and Chandler both arrived September 27, 1996. To complete the complement of ships at Naval Station Everett, USS Abraham Lincoln made a change of homeport from Puget Sound Naval Shipyard at Bremerton to Everett on January 8, 1997. Fife and Rodney M. Davis made their official change of homeport from Japan to Everett on May 5, 1998. Callaghan was decommissioned on March 31, 1998, followed by the Chandler on September 23, 1999.

In July 1999 the Navy completed a Final Environmental Impact Statement (EIS) designed to determine the appropriate homeports for three Nimitz-class nuclear-powered aircraft carriers in the Pacific Fleet. The EIS examined four locations: Bremerton, Everett, San Diego, and Pearl Harbor. The Navy's decision was to develop facilities to homeport two Nimitz-class carriers at Naval Air Station North Island, California in addition to John C. Stennis, and to maintain Everett as a homeport for one Nimitz-class aircraft carrier. The successful completion of Abraham Lincoln's six-month maintenance period at the Puget Sound Naval Shipyard in Bremerton, validated the Navy's preference to keep a carrier homeported in Everett. The in-depth EIS process began in December 1996. Following public scoping meetings held in communities at each of the four alternate locations in February 1997, the Navy spent more than 18 months examining the ports to determine how well they satisfied the CVN Homeporting Objectives and Requirements as they pertain to Operations and Training; Facilities and Infrastructure; Maintenance; and Quality of Life.

In June 2021, the Navy announced that Naval Station Everett would be the future home of the first 12 Constellation-class frigates. The Navy is expected to take delivery of the first ship, USS Constellation, sometime in 2026.

=== Other events ===
On September 15, 2000, two vessels from the Chinese Navy (Qingdao and Taicang) began a three-day visit to Naval Station Everett as part of a cultural exchange and goodwill tour for Chinese sailors. The visit was the second by a Chinese Navy vessel to the United States, following a similar goodwill program in San Diego in 1997.

== Facilities ==
=== Naval Support Complex ===
The Naval Support Complex is located in Smokey Point, approximately 11 miles (18 km) north of Everett, and houses the base's support facilities. The complex includes a commissary, Navy Exchange store, gas station, family service center, thrift shop, education offices, Bachelor Officer Quarters, craft shop/gear issue, chapel and religious education center, an auto hobby shop, ball fields and courts, fleet parking for personnel assigned to deployed Everett-based ships and a 50-room Navy Lodge. The campus was designed to look "more like a community college campus" than traditional military facilities and serves more than 30,000 personnel and families in Western Washington.

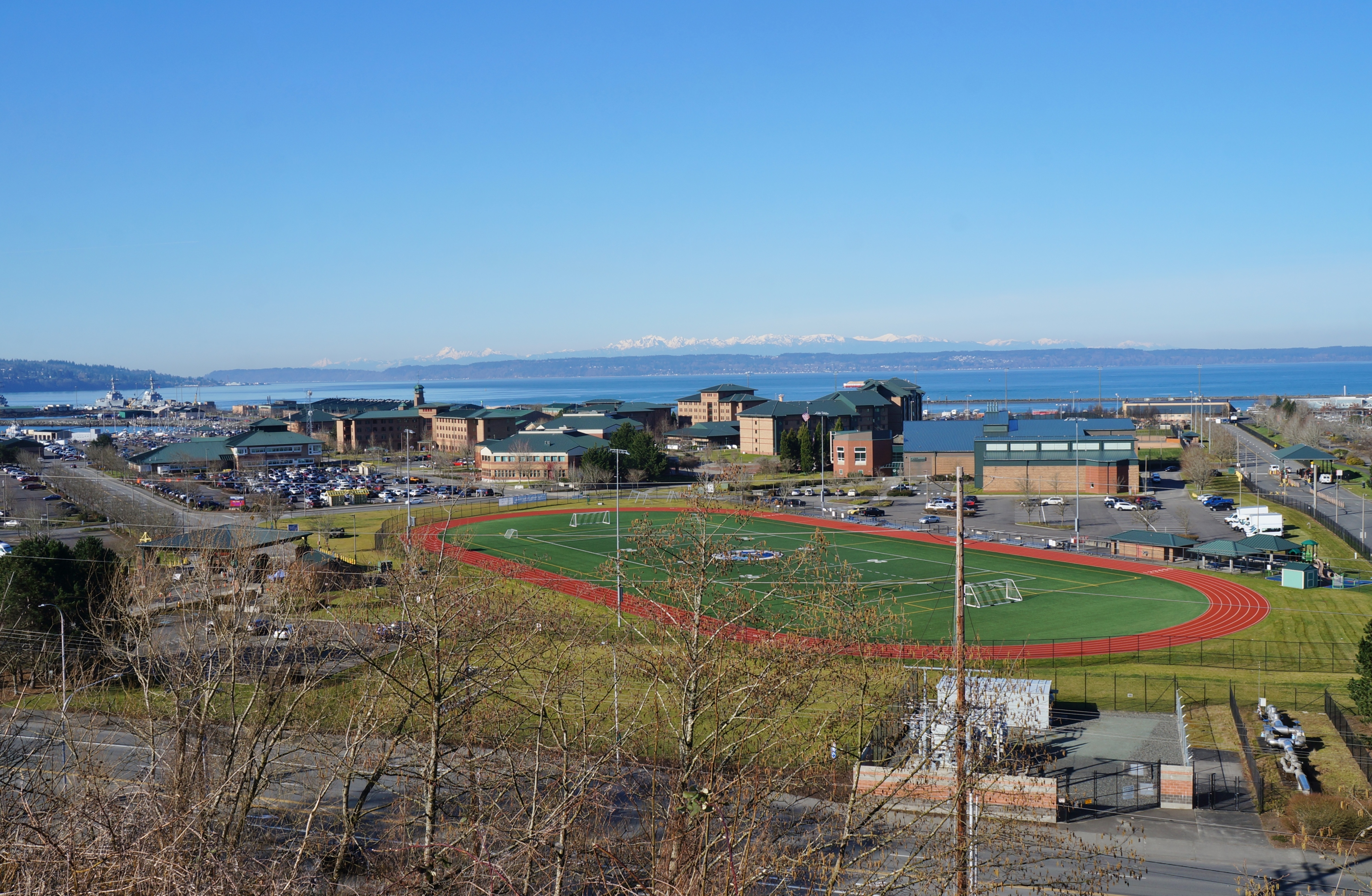
Naval Station Everett viewed from the east

The Navy originally proposed housing the support complex in downtown Everett in high-rise structures by 1992, but dropped the site after being unable to find 40 acres (16 ha) of suitable real estate. A site on the Tulalip Indian Reservation near Marysville was chosen in 1990, but was shelved after the Navy rejected the terms of the 75-year lease with the Tulalip Tribes. A new 52-acre (21 ha) site in Smokey Point was chosen in late 1992, and construction of the $90 million project began on August 30, 1993. The commissary and Navy Exchange opened on June 6, 1995, replacing similar facilities at Naval Air Station Sand Point in Seattle, while the rest of the complex opened later that year.

In 2012, the $33 million Marysville Armed Forces Reserve Center opened at a site south of the Naval Support Complex. The facility houses 250 soldiers from the 364th Expeditionary Sustainment Command of the U.S. Army Reserve, who moved from Seattle's Fort Lawton, and 300 members of the Washington Army National Guard; the facility is designed to support a total of 1,200 military members. It also includes a 147,000-square-foot (13,700 m^{2}) training center and services for members of the military and their families.

== Homeported ships ==
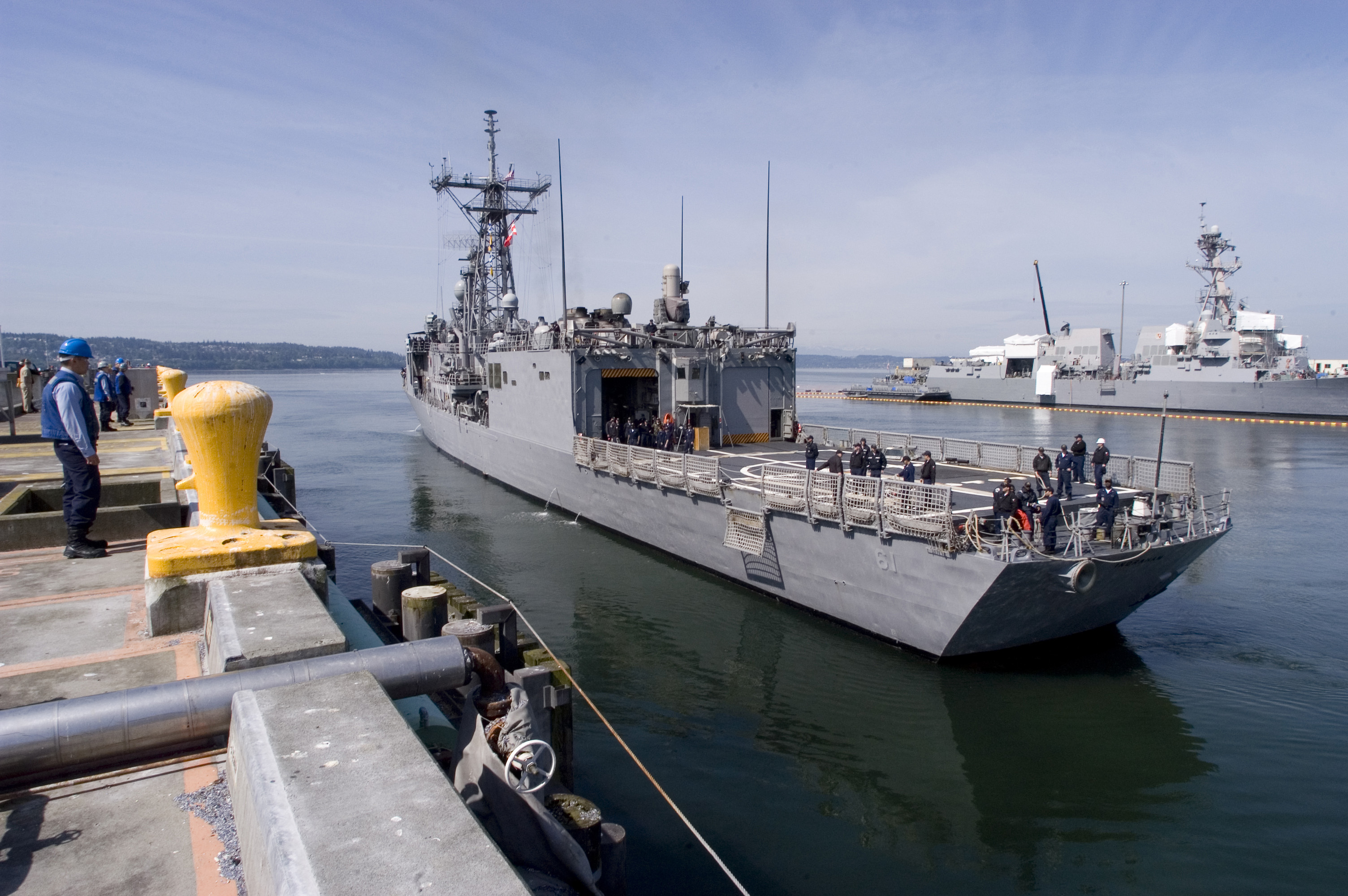
Guided missile frigate USS Ingraham (FFG 61) makes sternway while maneuvering to moor pier side at Naval Station Everett

=== Aircraft carriers ===
There are currently no aircraft carriers homeported at Naval Station Everett due to the reassignment of USS Nimitz to Naval Base Kitsap in January 2015. The carrier was planned to return to Everett in 2019, but the Navy announced in late 2018 that it would remain at Kitsap. The USS Abraham Lincoln was formerly homeported at Everett from 1994 to 2011, when it moved to Naval Station Norfolk in Virginia.

=== Guided missile frigates ===
First 12 Constellation-class frigates to be homeported at Everett beginning after first delivery in 2026.

=== Guided missile destroyers (7) ===
- USS Barry (DDG-52)
- USS John Paul Jones (DDG-53)
- USS John S. McCain (DDG-56)
- USS Kidd (DDG-100)
- USS Gridley (DDG-101)
- USS Sampson (DDG-102)
- USS Benfold (DDG-65)

=== Coast Guard Units (3) ===
- USCGC Henry Blake (WLM-563)
- USCGC Blue Shark (WPB-87360)
- Port Security Unit 313
