= USS Kidd (DDG-100) =

Arleigh Burke-class destroyer

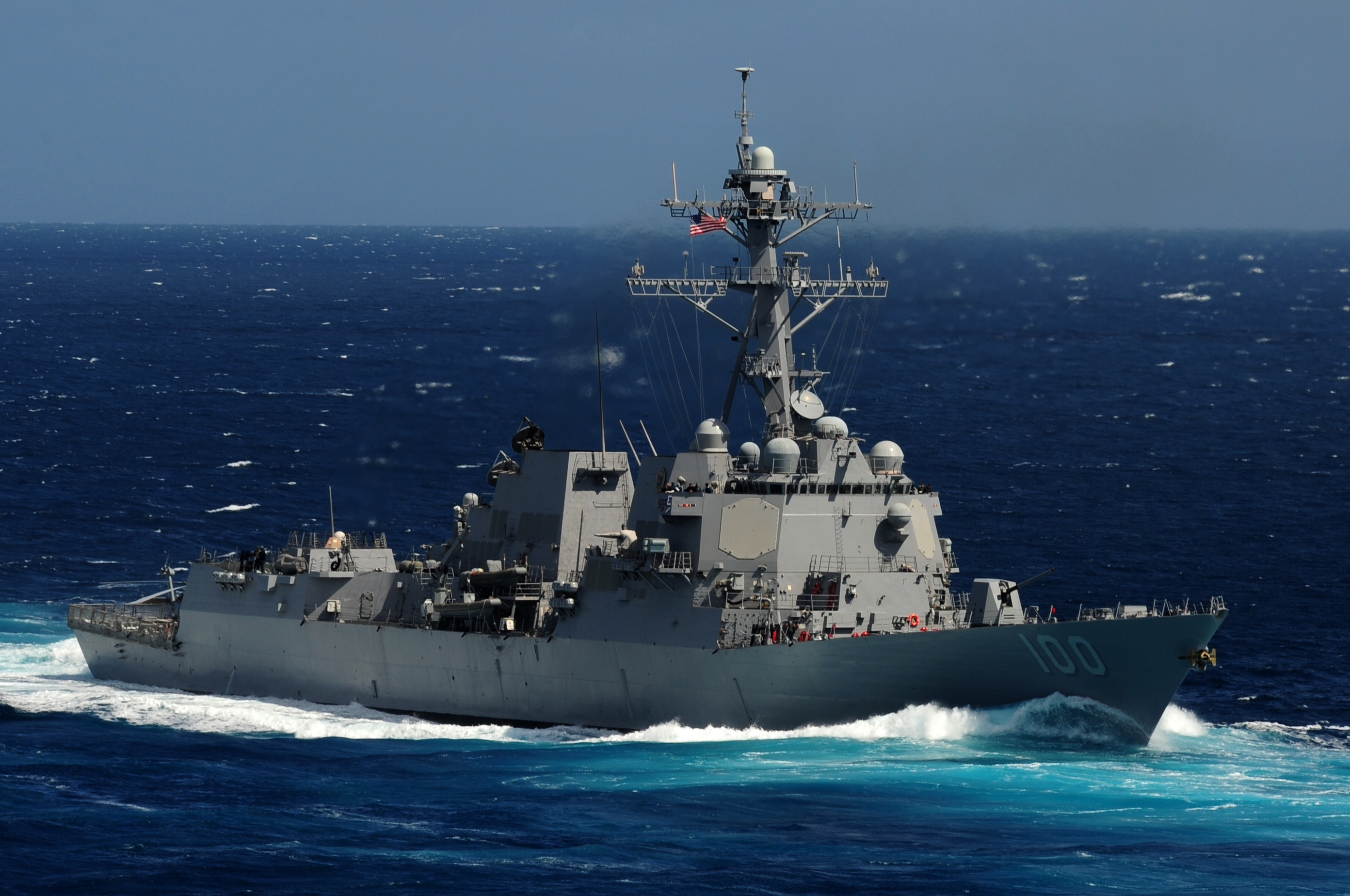
- USS Kidd on 18 May 2011

History

United States
- Name: Kidd
- Namesake: USS Kidd (DD-661)
- Ordered: 6 March 1998
- Builder: Ingalls Shipbuilding
- Laid down: 29 April 2004
- Launched: 15 December 2004
- Commissioned: 9 June 2007
- Home port: Everett
- Identification: MMSI number: 368011000; Callsign: NKID; Hull number: DDG-100
- Motto: On To Victory
- Status: in active service
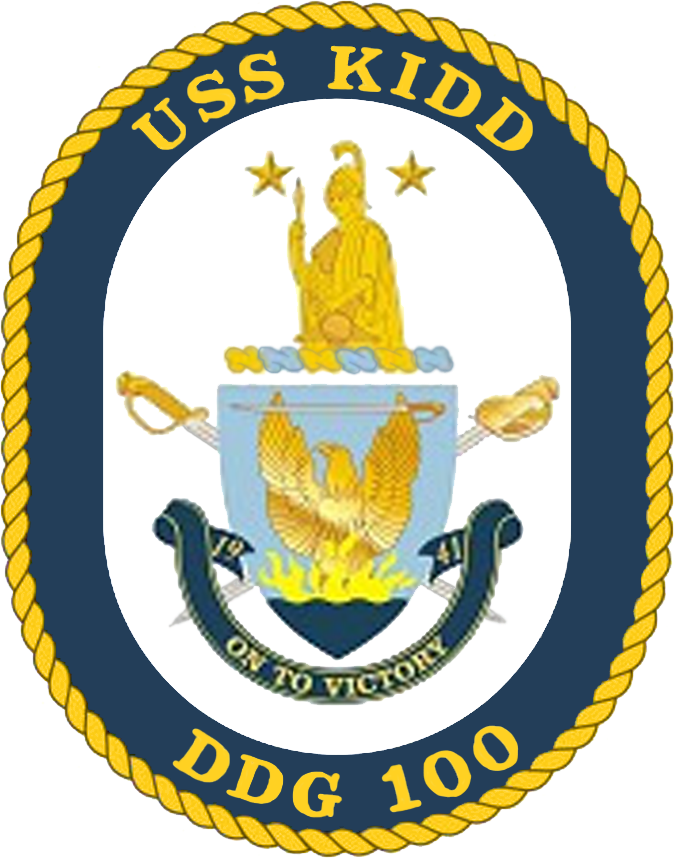
- Badge

General characteristics
- Class & type: Arleigh Burke-class destroyer
- Displacement: 9,200 tons
- Length: 509 ft 6 in (155.30 m)
- Beam: 66 ft (20 m)
- Draft: 31 ft (9.4 m)
- Propulsion: 4 × General Electric LM2500-30 gas turbines, 2 shafts, 100,000 shp (75 MW)
- Speed: 30+ knots (55+ km/h)
- Complement: 380 officers and enlisted
- Armament: Guns: 1 × 5-inch (127 mm)/62 mk 45 mod 4 (lightweight gun); 1 × 20 mm (0.8 in) Phalanx CIWS; 2 × 25 mm (0.98 in) Mk 38 machine gun system; 4 × 0.50 inches (12.7 mm) caliber guns; Lasers: Optical Dazzling Interdictor, Navy (ODIN); Missiles: 1 × 32-cell, 1 × 64-cell (96 total cells) Mk 41 vertical launching system (VLS): RIM-66M surface-to-air missile; RIM-156 surface-to-air missile; RIM-174A standard ERAM; RIM-161 anti-ballistic missile; RIM-162 ESSM (quad-packed); BGM-109 Tomahawk cruise missile; RUM-139 vertical launch ASROC; Torpedoes: 2 × Mark 32 triple torpedo tubes: Mark 46 lightweight torpedo; Mark 50 lightweight torpedo; Mark 54 lightweight torpedo
- Aircraft carried: 2 × MH-60R Seahawk helicopters

USS Kidd (DDG-100) is an Arleigh Burke-class (Flight IIA) Aegis guided missile destroyer in the United States Navy. She is the third Navy ship named after Rear Admiral Isaac C. Kidd, who was on board USS Arizona during the attack on Pearl Harbor, and was the first American flag officer to die in World War II. The ship is part of Destroyer Squadron 1 of Carrier Strike Group 1 which is currently headed by the Nimitz-class nuclear-powered aircraft carrier USS Carl Vinson. USS Kidd is the only active ship in the Navy officially allowed to fly the Jolly Roger.

== Construction and career ==
Kidd was christened by Admiral Kidd's granddaughters, Regina Kidd Wolbarsht and Mary Kidd Plumer on 22 January 2005, at Ingalls Shipbuilding in Pascagoula, Mississippi. Commander Richard E. Thomas of Westwood, New Jersey, served as her first commanding officer until February 2008. Commander Charles P. Good of Huntington Beach, California, took Kidd on her maiden deployment.

While in the midst of final outfitting, the ship was holed and partially flooded at the shipyard docks during Hurricane Katrina on the Mississippi Gulf Coast, requiring a return to dry dock for repairs, which included cutting out a turbine, delaying her commissioning and deployment with the Navy. She was commissioned at Galveston, Texas on 9 June 2007. Kidd is currently homeported in Everett, Washington.

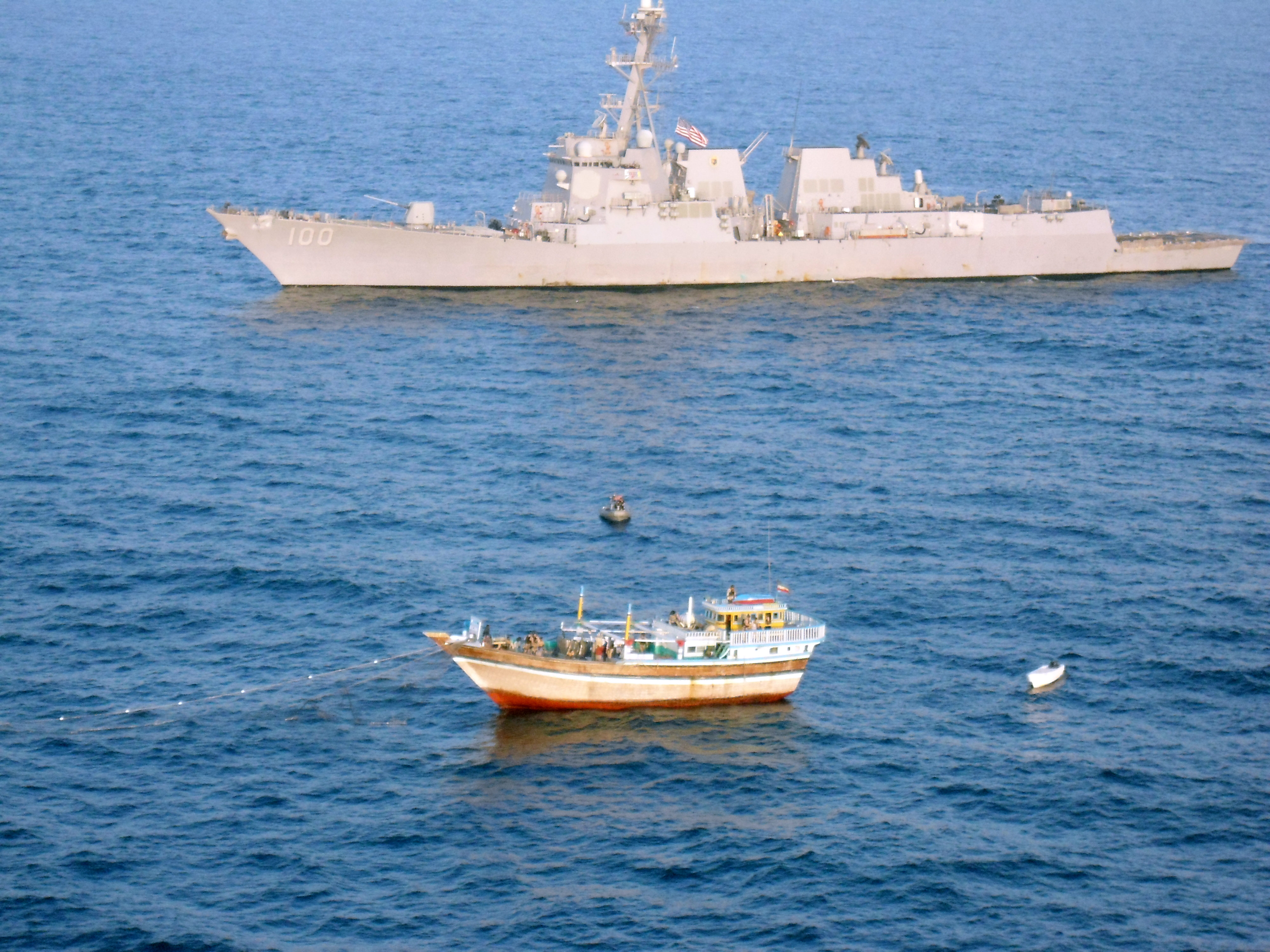
USS Kidd rescues Iranian fishing dhow from pirates, 5 January 2012

On 5 January 2012, Kidd rescued the 13-member crew of the Iranian-flagged fishing vessel Al Molai from Somali pirates who had been holding them hostage for over 40 days, capturing fifteen pirates in the process with no casualties.

=== Search for Malaysia Airlines MH 370 ===
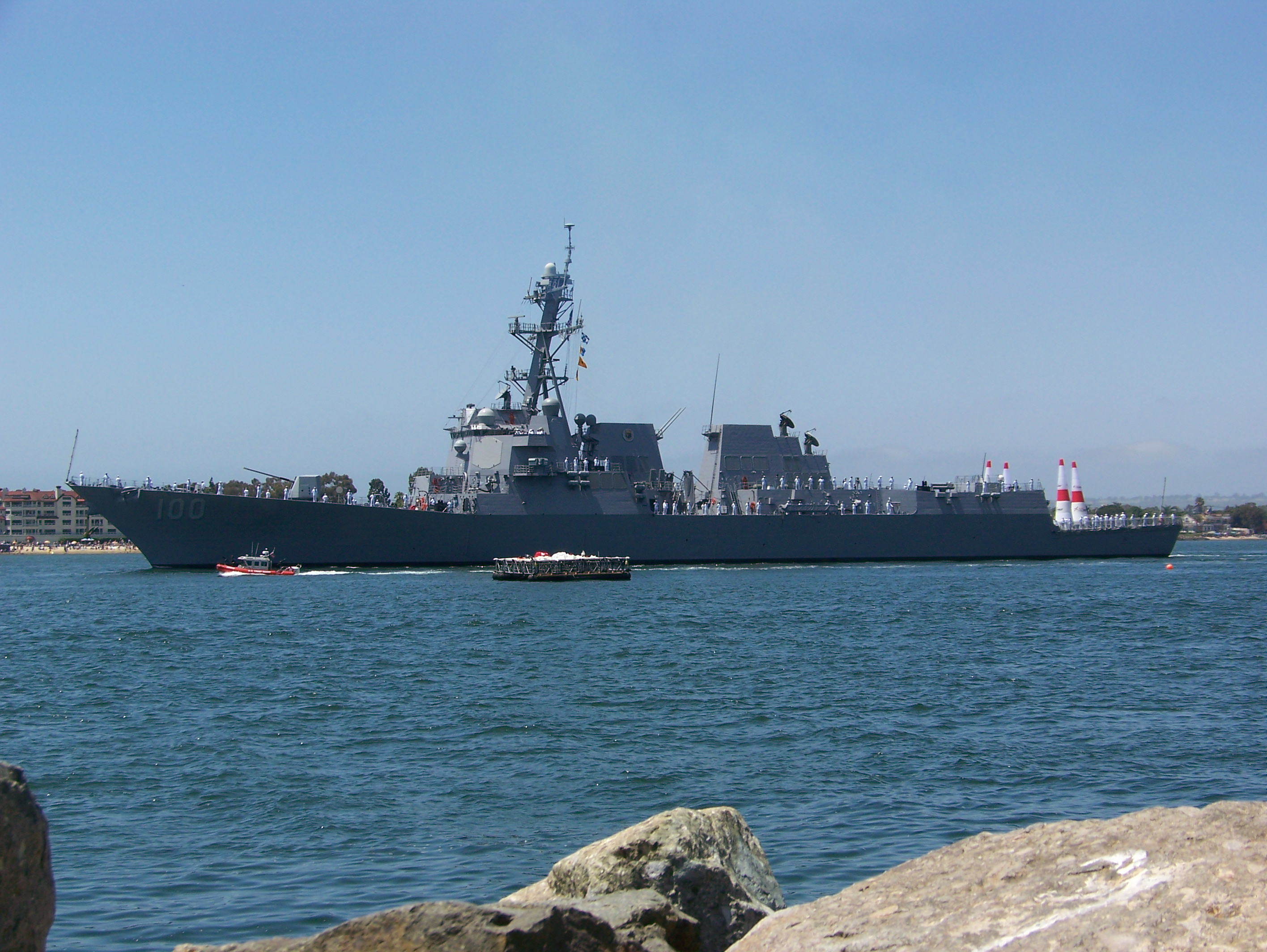
USS Kidd in San Diego in May 2008

On 10 March 2014, the ship joined the search for Malaysia Airlines Flight 370 two days after it went missing over the South China Sea. Kidd was the second Navy ship to be deployed in the search. She joined USS Pinckney, and more than 40 other ships and 32 aircraft from Malaysia, Australia, China, India, Thailand, Indonesia, Singapore, Taiwan, Vietnam, New Zealand, and the Philippines taking part in the search and rescue. On 14 March it was announced that Kidd would be relocated to the Indian Ocean in search of the plane, since new evidence pointed to the possibility of the plane being there.

=== 2020 COVID-19 pandemic ===
On 24 April 2020, the United States Navy reported that a sailor assigned to Kidd had tested positive for the virus after being medically evacuated the previous day from operations at sea. After the sailor's test returned positive, the Navy sent a medical team to the ship to conduct contact tracing and test sailors for the virus on board. By the morning of 24 April, 17 additional sailors tested positive, with additional cases expected as testing continued.

The initial patient was stable and recovering at a medical facility in San Antonio, Texas. It was planned for Kidd to return to port so that she could be disinfected. This was the second instance of the coronavirus being found aboard an American naval ship that had been deployed.

=== In popular culture ===
The ship was featured in the Michael Bay film Transformers: Revenge of the Fallen (2009). In the film, the ship had a rail gun used to shoot and kill a Decepticon named Devastator. However, it was USS Preble (DDG-88) that was filmed during the production of the movie to portray as the USS Kidd.
