= USS Rathburne (DD-113) =

Wickes-class destroyer

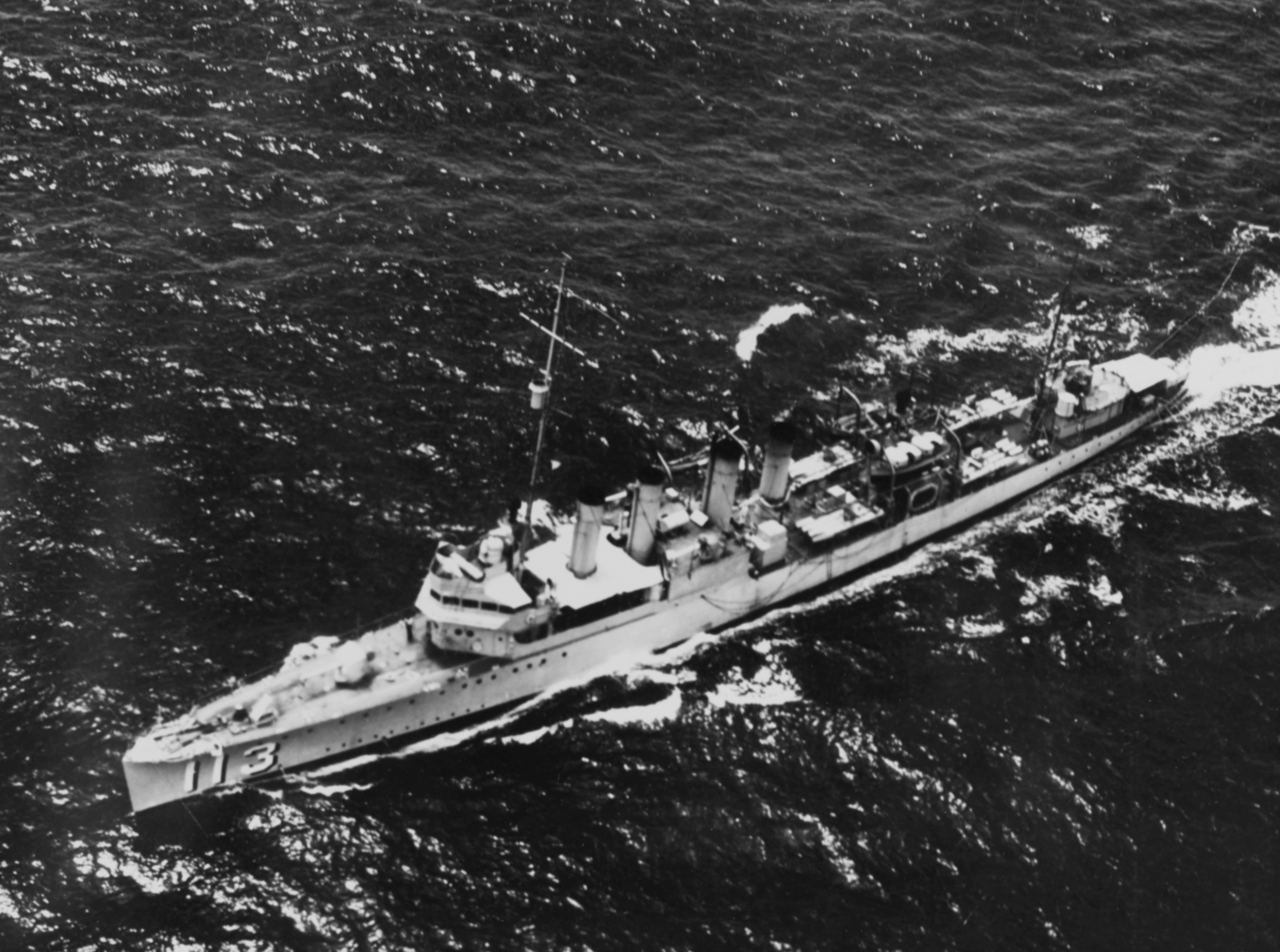
- USS Rathburne underway at sea during the early 1930s

History

United States
- Name: Rathburne
- Namesake: John Peck Rathbun
- Builder: William Cramp & Sons, Philadelphia
- Yard number: 450
- Laid down: 12 July 1917
- Launched: 27 December 1917
- Commissioned: 24 June 1918
- Decommissioned: 12 February 1923
- Identification: DD-113
- Recommissioned: 8 February 1930
- Decommissioned: 2 November 1945
- Reclassified: APD-25, 20 May 1944; DD-113, 20 July 1945
- Stricken: 28 November 1946
- Fate: Sold for scrapping, November 1946

General characteristics
- Class & type: Wickes-class destroyer
- Displacement: 1,060 tons
- Length: 314 ft 5 in (95.8 m)
- Beam: 31 ft 0 in (9.4 m)
- Draft: 12 ft 0 in (3.7 m)
- Speed: 35 knots (65 km/h)
- Complement: 133 officers and enlisted
- Armament: 4 × 4 in (102 mm)/50 guns; 2 × 3 in (76 mm)/23 guns; 12 × 21 in (533 mm) torpedo tubes

USS Rathburne (DD–113) was a Wickes-class destroyer in the United States Navy during both World Wars. She was the first ship named for John Peck Rathbun.

== Construction and commissioning ==
Rathburne was laid down on 12 July 1917 by William Cramp & Sons Company, Philadelphia. The ship was launched on 27 December 1917, sponsored by Miss Malinda B. Mull. The destroyer was commissioned on 24 June 1918.

== Service history ==
=== World War I ===
During the final months of World War I, July to November 1918, Rathburne escorted coastal convoys from the mid-Atlantic seaboard as far north as Halifax, Nova Scotia and oceanic convoys to the Azores. Completing her last convoy at New York on 27 November, she remained there until the new year, 1919, then sailed south to Cuba for winter maneuvers. With the spring, she again crossed the Atlantic, operated from Brest during May and June, and returned to New York in July. In August she was transferred to the Pacific Fleet. West coast operations occupied the remainder of the year, while the first half of 1920 was spent in overhaul at Puget Sound. Designated DD-113 in July, she cruised the waters off Washington and in the Gulf of Alaska from August 1920 until January 1921, and then shifted south for operations off California.

In July, she headed west and in late August arrived at Cavite to join the Asiatic Fleet. Based there for almost a year, she departed the Philippines on 16 July 1922, cruised off the China coast into August and on 30 August sailed from Nagasaki en route to Midway, Pearl Harbor, and San Francisco. Arriving at the latter on 2 October, she soon shifted to San Diego, where she was decommissioned on 12 February 1923 and was berthed with the reserve fleet until 1930.

Recommissioned on 8 February 1930, Rathburne remained in the eastern Pacific, engaged in exercises including fleet problems involved with strategic scouting, tracking, attacking, and defense of convoys and the defense of the west coast, through 1933. In early 1934 she departed San Diego for the Panama Canal and the Caribbean Sea for Fleet Problem XV, a three-phased problem involving the attack and defense of the canal; the capture of advanced bases; and fleet action. A cruise along the east coast followed and in the fall she returned to San Diego.

=== World War II ===
Two years later she was transferred to the West Coast Sound Training Squadron, and, until early 1944, she was used primarily as a schoolship.

On 25 April 1944, she departed San Diego for Puget Sound and conversion to a high-speed transport. Reclassified APD-25 on 20 May, she returned to San Diego in June; underwent amphibious training, and in July steamed for Hawaii. During late July and early August, she trained with underwater demolition teams (UDT). On 10 August, UDT 10 reported aboard, and on 12 August, Rathburne continued west.

After rehearsals in the Solomons, Rathburne sortied from Purvis Bay with TG 32.5 on 6 September. Six days later, she arrived off the Palaus to begin her first combat operations, the Peleliu and Angaur preinvasion bombardment and minesweeping operations. On 14 September she offloaded UDT 10, supported them with gunfire as they cleared the approaches to the Angaur beaches, and reembarked them on 15 September. Rathburne resumed covering fire for UDT 8, after reembarking UDT 10, then on 16 September took up screening duties. On 19 September, she departed Angaur and headed for Ulithi, where UDT 10 reconnoitered the Falalop and Asor beaches, beginning on 21 September. By 23 September the atoll had been occupied and Rathburne moved south, to New Guinea and the Admiralties, to prepare for the invasion of Leyte.

On 18 October, the APD entered Leyte Gulf. The next day, UDT 10 went ashore on Red Beach in the northern assault area between Palo and San Ricardo. Through the morning, Rathburne provided covering fire and shortly after noon pulled the team off the beach. On 20 October, she covered the landings, and then shifted to fire support off the Dulag beaches. Detached, soon after her arrival, she began messenger and passenger runs between the northern and southern transport areas.

The next day, she transited Surigao Strait en route to Kossol Roads, the Admiralties, the Solomons, and New Caledonia. At the end of November she steamed west, for New Guinea. In December, she prepared for the Luzon offensive. On the 27th, she sailed for Lingayen Gulf.

Assigned to TU 77.2.1, the San Fabian fire support group, she acted as part of the antiaircraft screen en route and splashed two enemy planes on 5 January 1945. The following day she was in Lingayen Gulf, screening larger ships bombarding the assault area. On 7 January, she landed UDT 10 on Blue Beach and covered them as they reconnoitered the area to destroy natural and manmade obstacles. On the 8th she resumed bombardment activities.

On 9 January, troops went ashore, and from then until 11 January, Rathburne alternated fire support duty with patrols in the transport area. On 11 January, she got underway for Leyte, but 14 days later headed back to Luzon to provide support during the push against Manila. UDT 10, disembarked on 29 January, reported no opposition at San Narciso, but Rathburne remained in the area until after the landings.

By 3 February, Rathburne was back in San Pedro Bay, whence, the next day, she sailed for Saipan. From Saipan, she carried mail to Iwo Jima in early March, then at mid-month she returned to the Bonin-Volcano area for antisubmarine patrol duty. On 22 February, she departed the area; transported prisoners of war to Guam; and prepared for duty off Okinawa.

Escorting LST Group 91 en route, Rathburne arrived at Kerama Retto on 18 April. The next day, she shifted to the Hagushi anchorage and took up screening and escort duty.

On the evening of 27 April, she was on patrol off Hagushi. Air alerts had been called throughout the day. At about 2200, her radar picked up an enemy plane on the port quarter, 3,700 yards (3,383 m) out but closing fast.

Increasing speed, changing course, and antiaircraft fire did not deter the kamikaze. He crashed the port bow on the waterline. Three compartments were flooded. Sound gear was put out of commission. Fires broke out on the forecastle. But there were no casualties. Damage control parties soon extinguished the fires and contained the flooding. Rathburne, slowed to 5 knots (9.3 km/h; 5.8 mph), made for Kerama Retto.

By mid-May, temporary repairs had been completed and she was underway for San Diego. Arriving on 18 June, she was reconverted to a destroyer and reclassified DD-113 on 20 July.

Still on the west coast when hostilities ceased in mid-August, Rathburne was ordered to the east coast for inactivation. Sailing on 29 September, she arrived at Philadelphia on 16 October and was decommissioned on 2 November 1945. Struck from the Navy list on 28 November, she was sold for scrapping to the Northern Metals Co, Philadelphia, in November 1946.

== Awards ==
Rathburne earned six battle stars during World War II.

== Notable crew ==
- Ernest E. Evans – future MOH recipient. Served aboard Rathburne in 1933 as an ensign.
