= FF(X) =

Planned US Navy frigate class

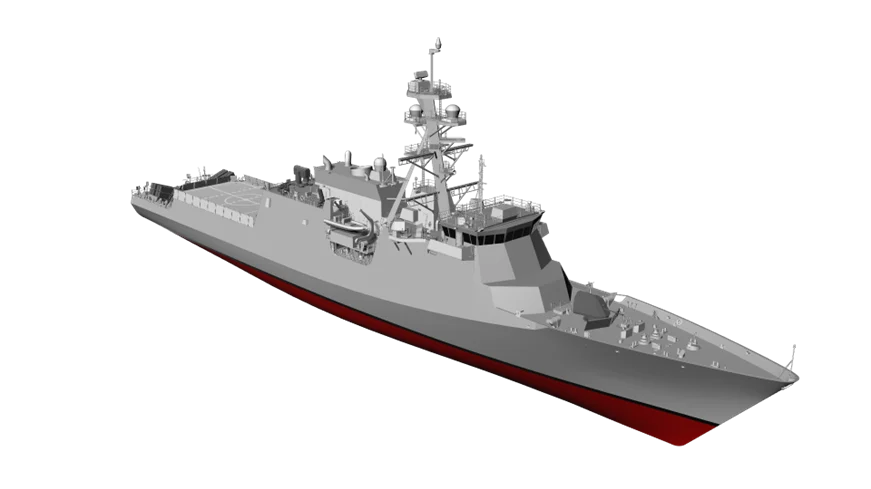
- Rendering of the FF(X) frigate, based on the Legend-class cutter

Class overview
- Builders: Huntington Ingalls Industries
- Operators: United States Navy (projected)
- Preceded by: Constellation class
- Planned: 50-65

General characteristics
- Type: Frigate
- Displacement: 4,750 tonnes (4,670 long tons; 5,240 short tons)
- Length: 421 feet (128 m)
- Beam: 54 feet (16 m)
- Draft: 22 feet (6.7 m)
- Speed: 28 knots (52 km/h; 32 mph)
- Range: 12,000 nautical miles (22,000 km; 14,000 mi)
- Complement: 148
- Sensors & processing systems: AN/SPS-77 3D air and surface search radar
- Electronic warfare & decoys: AN/SLQ-32(V)6 electronic warfare suite; 2 × Mk 53 Nulka Decoy Launcher System
- Armament: Flight I; 1 × Mk 110 57 mm gun; 1 × Mk 38 Mod 4 30mm gun; 1 × 21-cell Mk 49 RIM-116 Rolling Airframe Missile launcher; Up to 16 × Naval Strike Missile canister launchers or 48 AGM-114 Hellfire missiles for counter-UAV role or modular containerized mission payloads

FF(X) is the designation for a class of frigates intended for the United States Navy based on the National Security Cutter (NSC) or Legend-class cutter in service with the United States Coast Guard. The program was announced on December 19, 2025, and the ships will be built by Huntington Ingalls Industries.

== Development ==
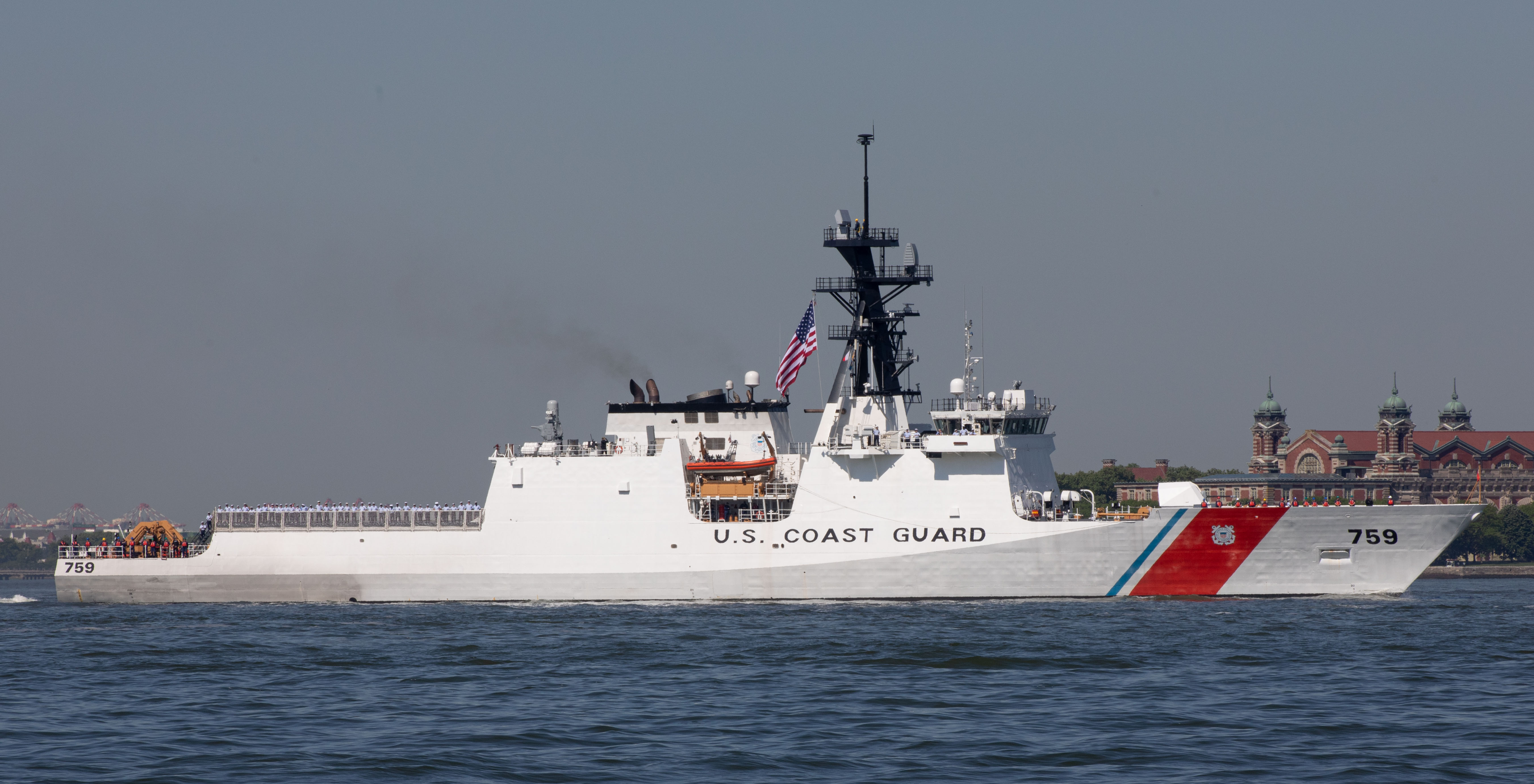
The Legend-class cutter, the base design for the FF(X)

On November 25, 2025, then-Secretary of the Navy John C. Phelan announced the cancellation of the Constellation-class frigate program beyond the first two ships, citing the need to build ships at a faster rate.

The FF(X) program was announced on December 19, 2025, in social media posts by Phelan and Chief of Naval Operations Admiral Daryl Caudle. The program's objective is to have the first ship launched by 2028. To achieve this objective, the US Navy is planning for Ingalls to utilize components from the canceled 11th Legend-class cutter, Friedman.

Specifications of the FF(X) were announced on January 16, 2026, at Surface Navy 2026's Future Fleet Panel. 50-65 ships spanning multiple flights are planned to be constructed. Modular construction across multiple shipyards is planned to expedite production of the FF(X).

US$242 million was allocated to long lead items for the FF(X) program as part of the Fiscal Year 2026 defense appropriations legislation passed in February 2026. According to the Navy's FY2027 budget request, the first FF(X) is projected to cost US$1.671 billion including long lead items and will be delivered by June 2030.

== Design ==
The specifications of the FF(X) differ from the preceding Constellation-class frigate. The FF(X) will be a smaller and more agile warship that is capable of performing a range of missions and tasks. Changes from the original NSC design include the construction of a platform above the stern boat deck for modular containerized payloads and unmanned systems. In the FF(X) renderings, a "shelf" was added to the bottom front end of the superstructure, presumably a space for future upgrades such as vertical launching systems (VLS), laser-based directed energy weapons, or some other close-in weapon systems.

The FF(X) is similar to HI Industries' 2012 "Patrol Frigate" proposal, also based on the Legend-class hull, previously offered to the U.S. Navy as a replacement for the Littoral Combat Ship. However, there are notable differences between the respective conceptual renderings, including variations in the size of the main superstructure and the gun turret. Notably, the Patrol Frigate design incorporated a 12-cell Mk 56 VLS unit, a capability not included on Flight I ships of the FF(X). The Patrol Frigate concept also included an expanded sensor suite.

=== Flight I ===
The Flight I FF(X) differs only slightly from the NSC design to expedite production. It will be armed with a Mk 110 57 mm gun, a Mk 38 Mod 4 30 mm gun, a Mk 49 launcher for 21 RIM-116 Rolling Airframe Missiles for point defense, and a flexible station at the stern of the ship for a variety of modular payloads, including up to 16 RGM-184 Naval Strike Missile anti-ship missiles or 48 AGM-114 Hellfire missiles for counter drone operations. The initial flight will not feature an integrated VLS or anti-submarine warfare equipment, though these may be added in the future.

=== Flight II ===
As of May 2026, development of the improved Flight II FF(X) has begun. A VLS and ASW equipment are being considered for the design.

== See also ==
- List of frigates of the United States Navy

Equivalent frigates

- Baden-Württemberg-class frigate (Germany)
- La Fayette-class frigate (France)
- Miguel Malvar-class frigate (Philippines)
- Type 053H3 frigate (China)
