= USCGC Blue Shark =

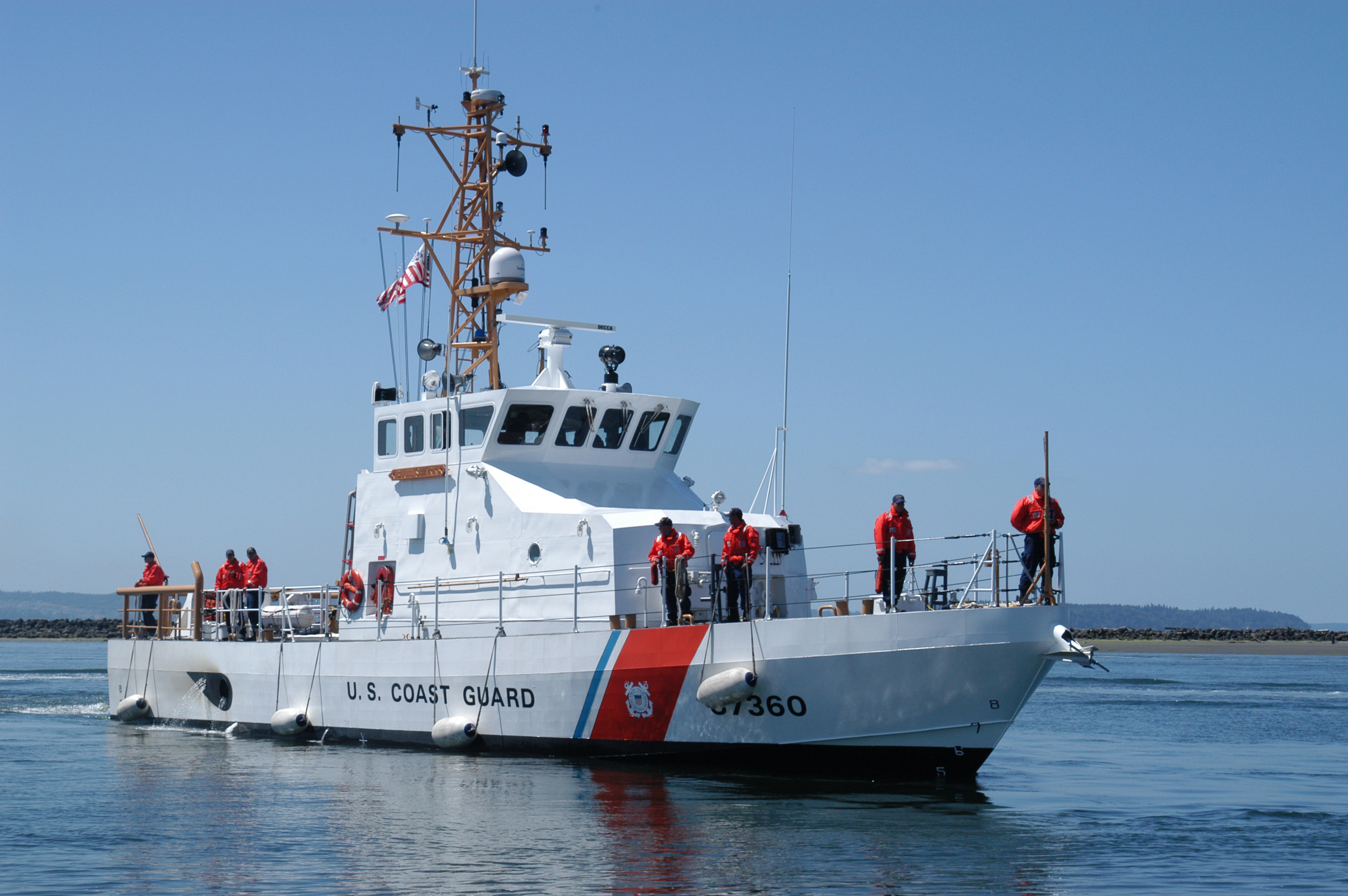
- USCGC Blue Shark (WPB-87360) in July 2005.

History

United States
- Name: USCGC Blue Shark
- Builder: Bollinger Shipyards
- Home port: Port Angeles, Washington, U.S.
- Identification: MMSI number: 366999636; Callsign: NLEX
- Status: in active service
- Badge

General characteristics
- Displacement: 91 lt
- Length: 87 ft (27 m)
- Beam: 19 ft 5 in (5.92 m)
- Draft: 5 ft 7 in (1.70 m)
- Propulsion: 2 x MTU diesels
- Speed: 25 kn (46 km/h; 29 mph)
- Range: 900 nmi (1,700 km)
- Endurance: 5 days
- Complement: 10
- Armament: 2 × .50 caliber M2 Browning machine guns

USCGC Blue Shark (WPB-87360) is an 87-foot (27 m) long Marine Protector-class coastal patrol boat of the United States Coast Guard built by Bollinger Shipyards in Lockport, Louisiana.

== History ==
Blue Shark, one of the newest cutters in the U.S. Coast Guard's fleet, is homeported at Everett, Washington and her primary missions are ports, waterways and coastal security, search and rescue, law enforcement, marine environmental response, recreational boating safety and military readiness.

== See also ==
- List of United States Coast Guard cutters
