= USS Congress (FFG-63) =

Future guided-missile frigate for the U.S. Navy

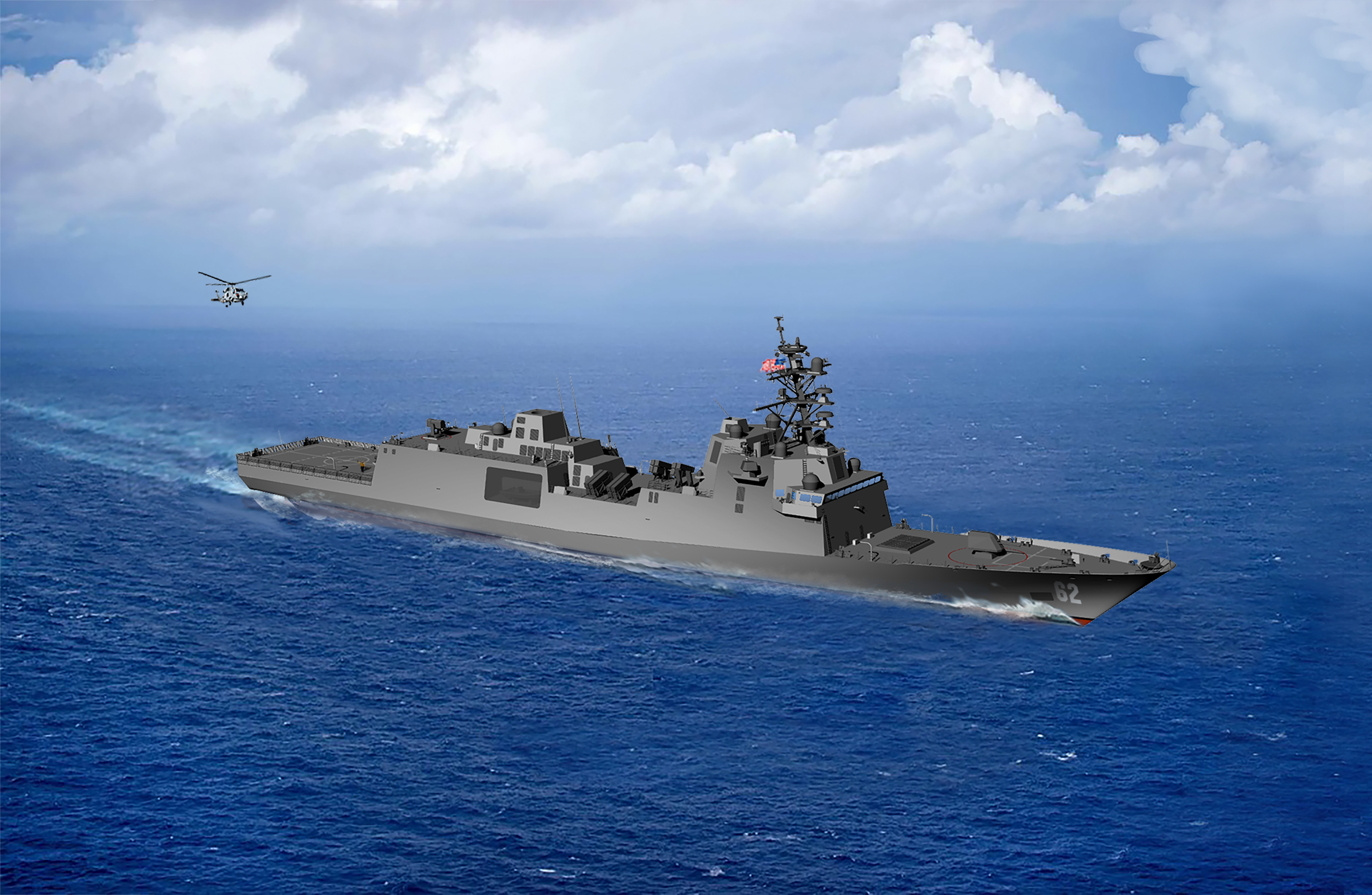
- Artist rendering of the final Constellation-class design

History

United States
- Name: Congress
- Namesake: USS Congress
- Awarded: 20 May 2021
- Builder: Fincantieri Marinette Marine, Marinette, Wisconsin
- Identification: Hull number: FFG-63
- Status: Ordered

General characteristics
- Class & type: Constellation-class frigate
- Displacement: 7,400 short tons (6,700 t)
- Length: 496 ft (151.18 m)
- Beam: 65 ft (19.81 m)
- Draft: 26 ft (7.92 m)
- Propulsion: CODLAG; 1 × General Electric LM2500+G4 gas turbine; driving a Philadelphia Gear Gearbox system; 2 × electric propulsion motors: INDAR 2 x 3.4 MW; 4 × ship service diesel generators Rolls-Royce MTU 20V 4000 M53B engine 3000 kW for a total output of 12 MW electrical ship power; 2 x fixed-pitch propellers; 1 × auxiliary propulsion unit Thrustmasters of Texas Hydrologic Retractable Thruster
- Speed: in excess of 26 kn (48 km/h; 30 mph)
- Range: 6,000 nmi (11,000 km; 6,900 mi) at 16 kn (30 km/h; 18 mph) (electric drive)
- Boats & landing craft carried: 2 × rigid-hulled inflatable boats
- Capacity: 200 accommodations
- Complement: 140 crew
- Sensors & processing systems: COMBATSS-21 Combat Management System (AEGIS derivative); AN/SPY-6(V)3 Enterprise Air Surveillance Radar (EASR); AN/SPS-73(V)18 - Next Generation Surface Search Radar; AN/SLQ-61 light weight towed array sonar; AN/SQS-62 Variable-Depth Sonar; AN/SQQ-89F undersea warfare/anti-submarine warfare combat system; Cooperative Engagement Capability
- Electronic warfare & decoys: SLQ-32(V)6 Surface Electronic Warfare Improvement Program (SEWIP) Block 2; Mk53 Nulka decoy launching system
- Armament: 32 Mark 41 VLS cells with: Possibly RIM-162 ESSM Block 2 and/or RIM-174 Standard ERAM missiles; Planned RIM-66 Standard SM-2 Block 3C; 8 × or 16 × canister launched Over-the-horizon Anti-Ship Weapons (likely Naval Strike Missile); RIM-116 Rolling Airframe Missile launched from Mk 49 Guided Missile Launching System (21 cell); Mk 110 57mm gun with the Advanced Low Cost Munition Ordnance (ALaMO) projectile and related systems.; Various machine guns M240 or M2
- Aircraft carried: 1 × MH-60R Seahawk helicopter; MQ-8C Firescout

USS Congress (FFG-63) will be the second ship of the Constellation class of guided-missile frigates and the seventh ship in the United States Navy bearing this name. She is named in honor of the first USS Congress, one of the original six frigates of the United States Navy, and her name was among ten names submitted to President George Washington by Secretary of War Timothy Pickering in March 1795 for the frigates that were to be constructed.
