= USS Constellation (FFG-62) =

Future guided-missile frigate for the U.S. Navy

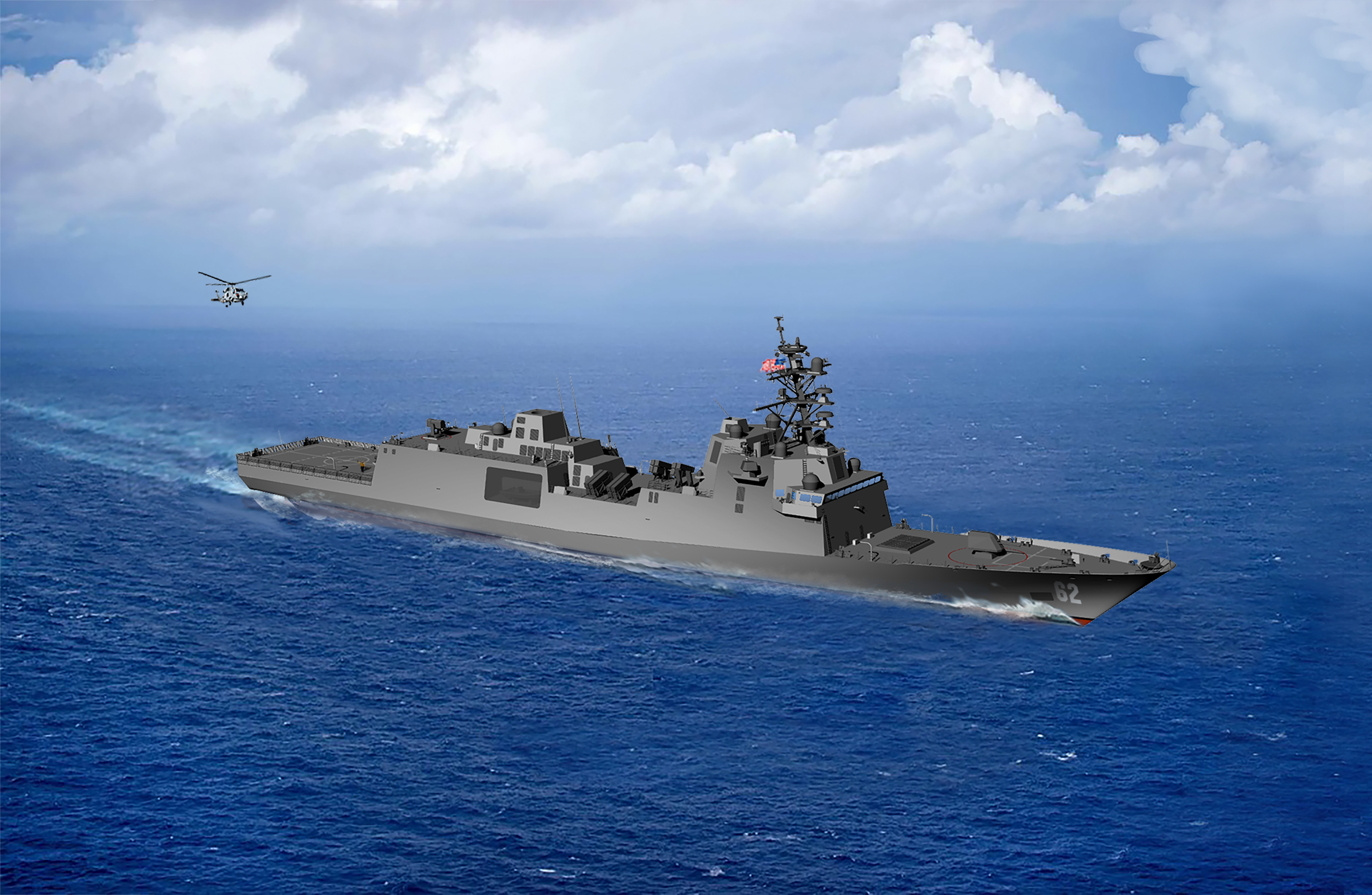
- Artist rendering of the final Constellation-class design

History

United States
- Name: Constellation
- Namesake: USS Constellation
- Awarded: 30 April 2020
- Builder: Fincantieri Marinette Marine, Marinette, Wisconsin
- Laid down: 12 April 2024
- Sponsored by: Melissa Braithwaite
- Home port: Naval Station Everett
- Identification: Hull number: FFG-62
- Status: Under construction

General characteristics
- Class & type: Constellation-class frigate
- Displacement: 7,400 short tons (6,700 t)
- Length: 496 ft (151.18 m)
- Beam: 65 ft (19.81 m)
- Draft: 18 ft (5.49 m)
- Propulsion: CODLAG; 1 × General Electric LM2500+G4 gas turbine; driving a Philadelphia Gear Gearbox system; 2 × electric propulsion motors: INDAR 2 x 3.4 MW; 4 × ship service diesel generators Rolls-Royce MTU 20V 4000 M53B engine 3000 kW for a total output of 12 MW electrical ship power; 2 x fixed-pitch propellers; 1 × auxiliary propulsion unit Thrustmasters of Texas Hydrologic Retractable Thruster
- Speed: in excess of 26 kn (48 km/h; 30 mph)
- Range: 6,000 nmi (11,000 km; 6,900 mi) at 16 kn (30 km/h; 18 mph) (electric drive)
- Boats & landing craft carried: 2 × 7m or 2 x 11m rigid-hulled inflatable boats; 12 x Canistered 25 Person Encapsulated Life Boats
- Capacity: 200 accommodations
- Complement: 140 crew
- Sensors & processing systems: COMBATSS-21 Combat Management System (AEGIS derivative); AN/SPY-6(V)3 Enterprise Air Surveillance Radar (EASR); AN/SPS-73(V)18 - Next Generation Surface Search Radar; TB-37 Multi-Function towed array sonar; Thales Group CAPTAS-4 Low Frequency Variable-Depth Sonar; AN/SQQ-89(V)15 undersea warfare/anti-submarine warfare combat system; Cooperative Engagement Capability
- Electronic warfare & decoys: SLQ-32(V)6 Surface Electronic Warfare Improvement Program (SEWIP) Block 2; Mk53 Nulka decoy launching system
- Armament: 32 Mk 41 VLS cells with: Possibly RIM-162 ESSM Block 2 and/or RIM-174 Standard ERAM missiles; Planned RIM-66 Standard SM-2 Block 3C; 16 × canister launched Naval Strike Missiles; RIM-116 Rolling Airframe Missile launched from Mk 49 Guided Missile Launching System (21 cell); Mk 110 57mm gun with the Advanced Low Cost Munition Ordnance (ALaMO) projectile and related systems.; Various machine guns M240 or M2
- Aircraft carried: 1 × MH-60R Seahawk helicopter; 1 x MQ-8C Firescout
- Aviation facilities: Secure & Traverse Aircraft Handling System * Horizontal Reference System * Night Vision Device Compatibility

USS Constellation (FFG-62) will be the lead ship of the Constellation class of guided-missile frigates and the fifth ship in the United States Navy bearing this name. She is named in honor of the first USS Constellation, one of the original six frigates of the U.S. Navy, which was named for the constellation of stars on the flag of the United States. The ship will be sponsored by Melissa Braithwaite, the wife of Secretary of the Navy Kenneth Braithwaite.

Construction of Constellation began on 31 August 2022, and the keel was laid on 12 April 2024. She was originally expected to enter service in 2026, but because of design changes and projected service life limitations, she is not expected to be delivered until 2029.
