= USS Rathburne (FF-1057) =

1969 Knox-class frigate

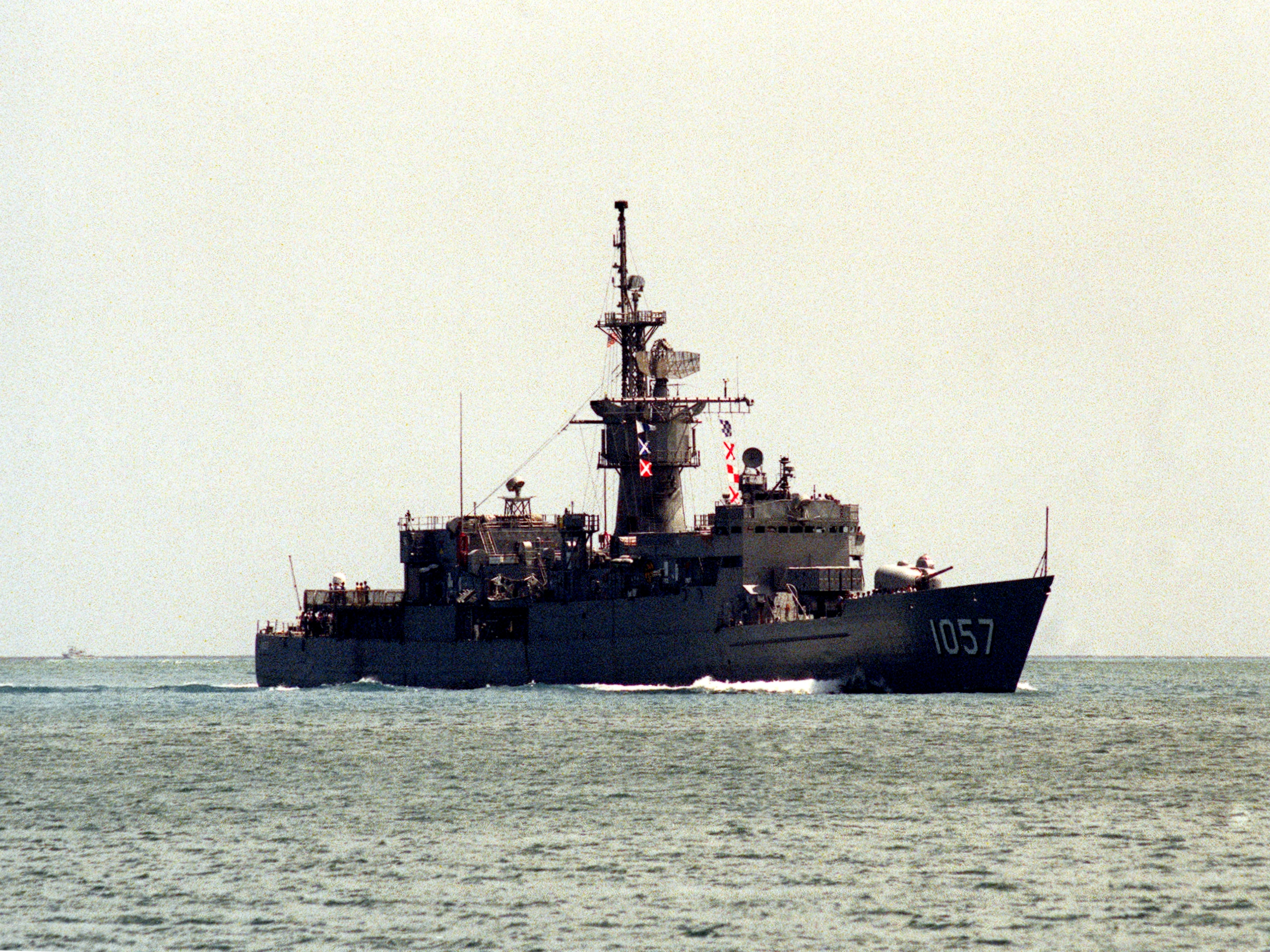
- USS Rathburne (FF-1057)

History

United States
- Name: Rathburne
- Namesake: Variant spelling of the last name of John Rathbun (1746-1782), a Continental Navy officer
- Ordered: 22 July 1964
- Builder: Lockheed Shipbuilding and Construction Company, Seattle, Washington
- Laid down: 8 January 1968
- Launched: 2 May 1969
- Sponsored by: Mrs. Charles A. Bowsher
- Commissioned: 16 May 1970
- Decommissioned: 14 February 1992
- Stricken: 11 January 1995
- Motto: Proud Defender
- Fate: Sunk as target, 5 July 2002
- Notes: delivered 8 May 1970

General characteristics
- Class & type: Knox-class frigate
- Displacement: 3,305 tons (4,295 full load)
- Length: 438 ft (134 m)
- Beam: 46 ft 9 in (14.25 m)
- Draft: 24 ft 9 in (7.54 m)
- Propulsion: 2 × CE 1200psi boilers; 1 Westinghouse geared turbine; 1 shaft, 35,000 shp (26,000 kW)
- Speed: over 27 kn (50 km/h)
- Range: 4,500 nmi (8,300 km) at 20 kn (37 km/h)
- Complement: 18 officers, 267 enlisted
- Sensors & processing systems: AN/SPS-40 Air Search Radar; AN/SPS-67 Surface Search Radar; AN/SQS-26 Sonar; AN/SQR-18 Towed array sonar system; Mk68 Gun Fire Control System
- Electronic warfare & decoys: AN/SLQ-32 Electronics Warfare System
- Armament: one Mk-16 8 cell missile launcher for RUR-5 ASROC and Harpoon missiles; one Mk-42 5-inch/54 caliber gun; Mark 46 torpedoes from four single tube launchers; one Mk-25 BPDMS launcher for Sea Sparrow missiles, later replaced by Phalanx CIWS
- Aircraft carried: one SH-2 Seasprite (LAMPS I) helicopter

USS Rathburne (FF-1057) was a Knox-class frigate of the US Navy. Despite the different spelling, she was named for Continental Navy officer John Rathbun (1746–1782).

== Construction ==
Rathburne was laid down 8 January 1968, by Lockheed Shipbuilding and Construction Company at Seattle, Washington. She was launched on 2 May 1969, sponsored by Mrs. Charles A. Bowsher, and commissioned on 16 May 1970.

== Design and description ==
The Knox-class design was derived from the Brooke-class frigate modified to extend range and without a long-range missile system. The ships had an overall length of 438 feet (133.5 m), a beam of 47 feet (14.3 m) and a draft of 25 feet (7.6 m). They displaced 4,066 long tons (4,131 t) at full load. Their crew consisted of 13 officers and 211 enlisted men.

The ships were equipped with one Westinghouse geared steam turbine that drove the single propeller shaft. The turbine was designed to produce 35,000 shaft horsepower (26,000 kW), using steam provided by 2 C-E boilers, to reach the designed speed of 27 knots (50 km/h; 31 mph). The Knox class had a range of 4,500 nautical miles (8,300 km; 5,200 mi) at a speed of 20 knots (37 km/h; 23 mph).

The Knox-class ships were armed with a 5"/54 caliber Mark 42 gun forward and a single 3-inch/50-caliber gun aft. They mounted an eight-round RUR-5 ASROC launcher between the 5-inch (127 mm) gun and the bridge. SONAR equipment was the AN-SQS-26CX SONAR and the MK-114 Fire Control. Close-range anti-submarine defense was provided by two twin 12.75-inch (324 mm) Mk 32 torpedo tubes. The ships were equipped with a torpedo-carrying DASH drone helicopter; its telescoping hangar and landing pad were positioned amidships aft of the mack. Beginning in the 1970s, the DASH was replaced by a SH-2 Seasprite LAMPS I helicopter and the hangar and landing deck were accordingly enlarged. Most ships also had the 3-inch (76 mm) gun replaced by an eight-cell BPDMS missile launcher in the early 1970s.

== Service history ==
Rathburne arrived at her home port of Pearl Harbor, Hawaii on 20 July 1970, and spent the remainder of that year and the first quarter of the next engaged in weapons systems' testing and various exercises. On 14 April 1971, she departed Pearl Harbor, for a six-month WestPac deployment, returning to Hawaii, on 27 October, for an extended upkeep period. After a short visit to the west coast in May and June 1972, Rathburne embarked upon her second tour of duty in WestPac 31 July 1972. She ended 1972, and began 1973, in the western Pacific, off the coast of Vietnam, and did not return to Pearl Harbor until 25 February 1973. She remained in the Pearl Harbor area throughout 1973 and was still operating there in January 1974.

== Decommissioning ==
Rathburne was decommissioned on 14 February 1992, and stricken from the Naval Vessel Register on 11 January 1995. She was sunk as a target during fleet training exercise RIMPAC 2002 on 5 July 2002.
