= USS Ford (FFG-54) =

US Navy frigate

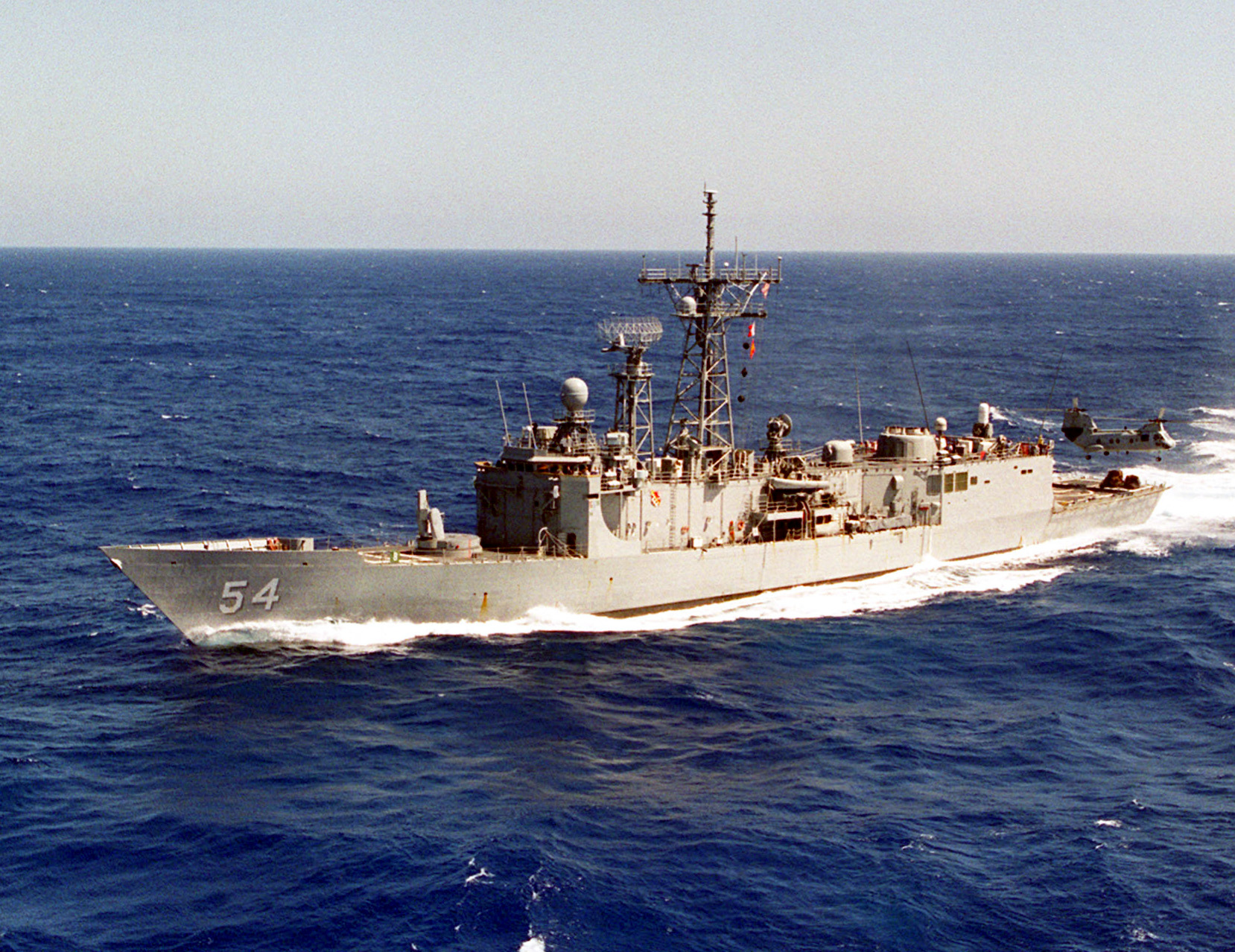

History

United States
- Name: Ford
- Namesake: Gunner's Mate Patrick O. Ford
- Awarded: 22 May 1981
- Builder: Todd Pacific Shipyards, Los Angeles Division, San Pedro, California
- Laid down: 11 July 1983
- Launched: 23 June 1984
- Sponsored by: Jonda McFarlane
- Commissioned: 29 June 1985
- Decommissioned: 31 October 2013
- Home port: Naval Station Everett, Washington
- Identification: Hull symbol: FFG-54; Code letters: NPOF
- Motto: Tenacious
- Fate: Sunk as target, 1 October 2019
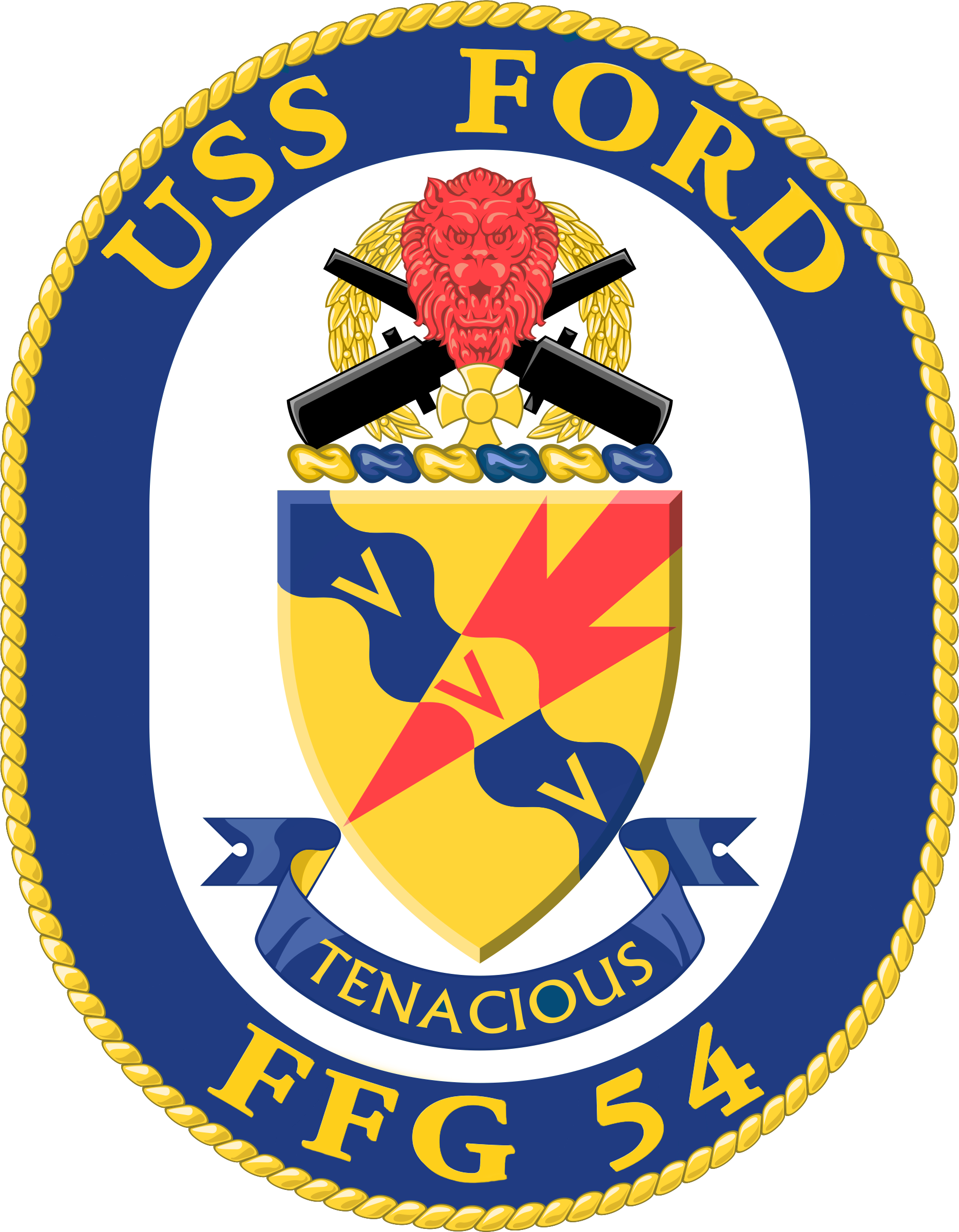
- Badge

General characteristics
- Class & type: Oliver Hazard Perry-class guided missile frigate
- Displacement: 4,100 long tons (4,200 t), full load
- Length: 453 feet (138 m), overall
- Beam: 45 feet (14 m)
- Draft: 22 feet (6.7 m)
- Propulsion: 2 × General Electric LM2500-30 gas turbines generating 41,000 shp (31 MW) through a single shaft and variable pitch propeller; 2 × Auxiliary Propulsion Units, 350 hp (260 kW) retractable electric azimuth thrusters for maneuvering and docking.
- Speed: over 29 knots (54 km/h)
- Range: 5,000 nautical miles at 18 knots (9,300 km at 33 km/h)
- Complement: 15 officers and 190 enlisted, plus SH-60 LAMPS detachment of roughly six officer pilots and 15 enlisted maintainers
- Sensors & processing systems: AN/SPS-49 air-search radar; AN/SPS-55 surface-search radar; CAS and STIR fire-control radar; AN/SQS-56 sonar.
- Electronic warfare & decoys: AN/SLQ-32
- Armament: As built: 1 × OTO Melara Mk 75 76 mm/62 caliber naval gun; 2 × Mk 32 triple-tube (324 mm) launchers for Mark 46 torpedoes; 1 × Vulcan Phalanx CIWS; 4 × .50-cal (12.7 mm) machine guns.; 1 × Mk 13 Mod 4 single-arm launcher for Harpoon anti-ship missiles and SM-1MR Standard anti-ship/air missiles (40 round magazine); Note: As of 2004, Mk 13 systems removed from all active US vessels of this class.; Mk 38 Mod 2 in place of Mk 13
- Aircraft carried: 2 × SH-60B LAMPS Mk III helicopters
- Aviation facilities: 2 × hangars; RAST helicopter hauldown system

USS Ford (FFG-54) was a Oliver Hazard Perry-class frigate in service with the United States Navy from 1985 to 2013. She was sunk as a target in the Pacific Ocean near Guam in 2019.

== Namesake ==
Patrick Osborne Ford was born on 2 May 1942 in San Francisco, California. He enlisted in the Navy at Phoenix, Arizona on 24 July 1959. He completed basic training at Naval Training Center San Diego, and received orders to report to Naval Station Adak Alaska. He reported aboard the destroyer USS James E. Kyes where he served as a Gunner's Mate until the end of his enlistment in 1963. Reenlisting on 11 February 1965 he served at the NS Long Beach, California. In 1966, he was transferred to the Danang, South Vietnam, where he was ordered to report aboard USS George K. MacKenzie. Following completion of his tour aboard MacKenzie, Ford was subsequently transferred to USS Henderson where he remained until the end of his second enlistment in 1967. Later that year Ford reenlisted for the second time at the Naval Receiving Station, San Francisco, California. He was ordered to the Naval Amphibious Base Coronado for River Patrol Craft Training. Following completion of training in 1968, GMG2 Ford was directed to report to Saigon, Republic of Vietnam. He was assigned to Task Force 116, River Squadron 5, River Section 535 in 1968.

For the next five months, he served as a Patrol Boat, River (PBR) sailor, monitoring the traffic of the many rivers and coastal waterways of the area. On 21 June 1968, GMG2 Ford was serving as the aft machine-gunner aboard PBR 750 as part of a two-boat patrol operating in the upper My Tho River near the town of Cái Bè. The boats were maneuvering down the river when they spotted a sampan fleeing into a nearby canal. The two patrol boats gave chase and captured the sampan one hundred meters further up the canal. As the PBR returned to the river with the captured sampan in tow, it was ambushed by a Viet Cong (VC) patrol that unleashed an overwhelming barrage of heavy machine-gunfire and rockets. Two B-40 rockets struck Ford's boat, immediately killing the patrol leader, William E. Dennis, and Boatswain's Mate First Class Scott C. Delph. Within seconds, the boat was ablaze and out of control, heading directly for the VC positions. Even as the boat was hit by four additional rockets and after suffering serious injuries, Ford maintained a steady volume of return fire from his aft machine-gunner's station. In the face of enemy gunfire and with his clothing on fire, Ford assisted three seriously wounded shipmates into the water. Ford told the last of the men to swim to the rescue boat while he maintained cover fire. He did not make it off the boat and despite search efforts was not found until the next morning on the beach of the river. However, his actions saved the lives of two of his shipmates. In recognition of his bravery, the US Navy posthumously awarded him the Navy Cross. A description of Gunner's Mate Ford's actions can be found here.

== Construction and commissioning ==
Ford was laid down by Todd Pacific Shipyards, Los Angeles Division, San Pedro, California on 11 July 1983. It was launched on 23 June 1984; sponsored by Jonda McFarlane, wife of National Security Advisor Robert C. McFarlane; and commissioned 29 June 1985. Ford was decommissioned 31 October 2013.

== Service history ==
Ford deployed on 28 November 1985, stopping first in San Diego to pick up Helicopter Anti-Submarine (Light) HSL 45 Detachment ONE, the embarking SH60B Detachment. After a five-hour stop Ford was underway to rendezvous with the Nimitz Battle Group under the command of Rear Admiral Lyle Bien, Commander, Carrier Group 7. The battle group then transited the Pacific Ocean from 2–20 December en route for Hong Kong. Ford participated in two ASW exercises with a US Los Angeles-class submarine and a new state-of-the-art Diesel submarine of the Japan Maritime Self-Defense Force. Ford remained part of the Carrier Group 7 battlegroup during the events of the Third Taiwan Straits Crisis.

The guided missile frigate completed her first deployment during a voyage to the Western Pacific and Middle East Force (17 August 1987 – 17 February 1988). She took part in Operation Earnest Will, an operation to maintain freedom of navigation within the Persian Gulf, that included renaming and reflagging 11 Kuwaiti tankers.

During a deployment to the Western Pacific, Persian Gulf, and Indian Ocean (13 November 1990 – 13 May 1991), Ford fought in Operation Desert Shield/Operation Desert Storm (28 January–18 March 1991). She alternated plane guard and "shotgun" duties for aircraft carriers Midway, Ranger, and Theodore Roosevelt during 34 continuous days of flight operations, and interdicted more than 90 merchant ships suspected of smuggling.

From 13 December 1995 to 3 May 1996 Ford was assigned to the Nimitz Battle Group. Along with the aircraft carrier USS Nimitz, Ford deployed to the Western Pacific, Indian Ocean and Persian Gulf. In March 1996, it patrolled the waters off Taiwan amid missile tests conducted by the Chinese in the area. It also cruised the Persian Gulf in support of Southern Watch prior to returning from deployment on 20 May 1996.

On 16 February 2007, Ford was awarded the 2006 Battle "E" award.

Ford completed a Cooperation Afloat Readiness and Training (CARAT) deployment starting 4 May 2007 and returning home on 20 September 2007. Ford made port visits to Japan, Philippines, Thailand, Malaysia, Singapore, Indonesia, Saipan, and Guam.

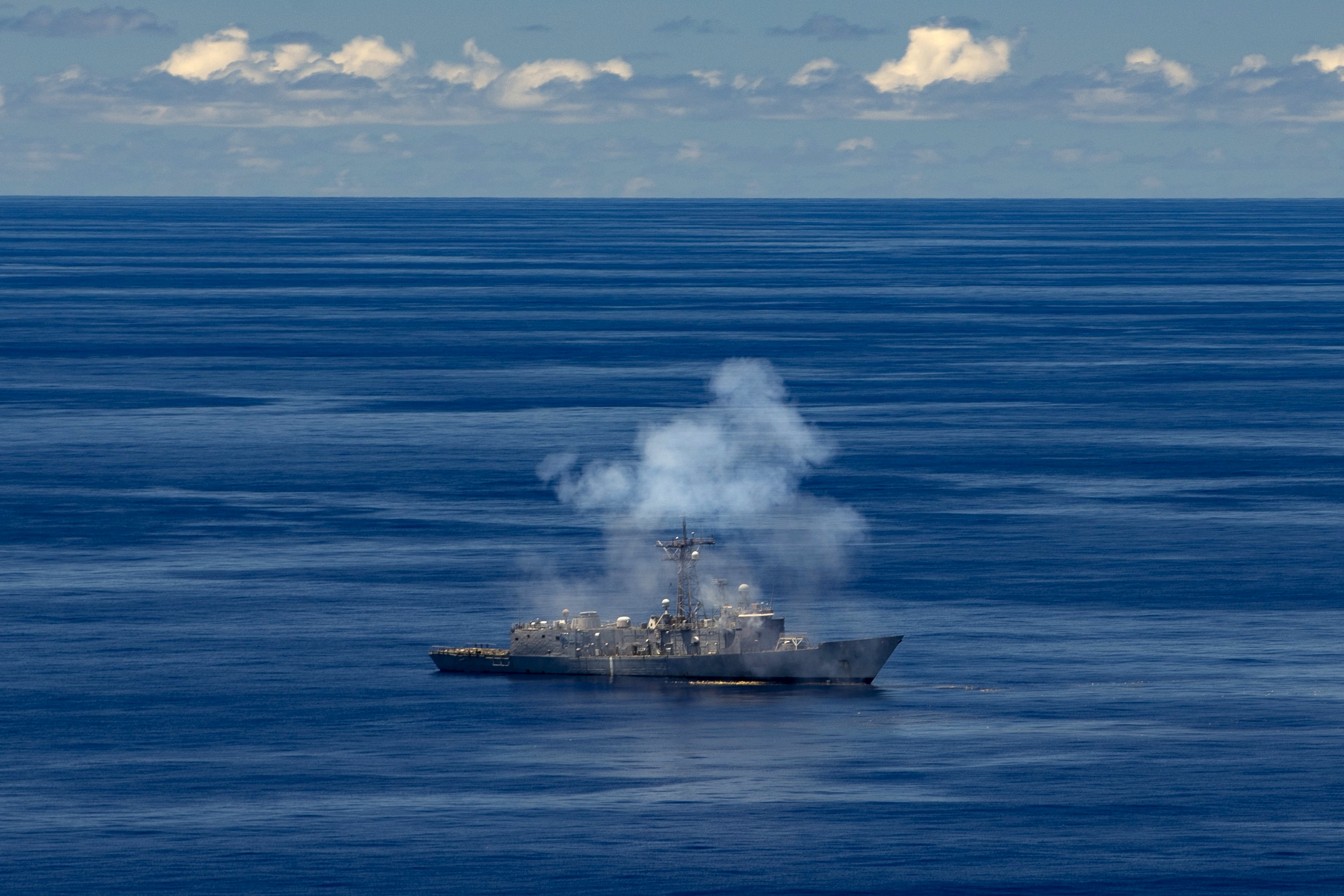
USS Ford under fire as a target ship off Guam, 1 October 2019

Inactivated on 19 August 2013, Ford was decommissioned 31 October 2013. As of September 2016, the ship was in reserve at Bremerton and was slated to be disposed of as a target. 1 October 2019 it was used as a target during a SINKEX near Guam. A MK-48 ADCAP torpedo was used to sink the Ford.

== Awards ==
- Navy Unit Citation with star
- Meritorious Unit Commendation with star
- Navy E Ribbon (four awards)
- Combat Action Ribbon
- Armed Forces Expeditionary Medal with three stars
- Southwest Asia Service Medal
