= Rathburn =

Rathburn is a surname. Notable people with the surname include:

- Chelsea Rathburn, American poet
- Cliff Rathburn, American comic book artist
- Eldon Rathburn (1916–2008), Canadian film composer
