= John Rathbun =

John Peck Rathbun (1746–1782) was an officer in the Continental Navy and in the United States Navy. Rathbun was from Rhode Island with family in Boston. Rathbun served in the Continental Navy from its late 1775 beginning as John Paul Jones First Lieutenant.

== Capture of Nassau ==
Rathbun was promoted to Captain in April 1777 and given command of the sloop-of-war Providence upon which he had participated in an American attack on New Providence in 1776. Rathbun took Providence back to the Bahamas on the night of 27 January 1778. Rathbun approached Nassau disguised as a trading sloop and anchored offshore in darkness. Twenty-six marines under command of Captain John Trevett went ashore by boat with a scaling ladder. They climbed Fort Nassau's 22-foot walls with the ladder and overpowered the two guards before daybreak. The Marines then continued sending the guards' periodic "All is well" call to guards outside of the fort while repositioned the fort's 18-pound cannon to cover parts of the city and harbor from which reinforcements might arrive. Dawn found the American stars and stripes flying over conquered enemy territory for the first time since the Continental Congress approved the flag. While his remaining marines patrolled the wall in full view of the city, Trevett sent three Marines to Fort Montague with a claim that a force of 230 Marines held Fort Nassau. Fort Montague surrendered, and Marines spiked the cannon and poured the gunpowder into the sea. Twenty-four American merchant seamen came forward to assist. The Americans had been stranded in Nassau when their ships had been captured by privateers. The American merchant seamen were sent into the harbor to demand surrender of five ships lying under the guns of Fort Nassau. Rathbun brought Providence into harbor in the early afternoon, and loaded all Fort Nassau's gunpowder and 300 small arms. Rathbun departed on the morning of 30th, with three captured ships manned by the American merchant seamen, after spiking the guns of Fort Nassau and burning the two ships he could not man. No blood had been shed.

== Action At Sea ==
In 1779, he assumed command of the frigate Queen of France and in July cruised off Newfoundland with Providence and Ranger. On the 16th, the ships sighted a convoy bound for Britain. Fog closed in, but when it lifted, Queen of France was next to a merchantman whose crew mistook the American for a British escort vessel. Rathbun took advantage of the situation, exploited the mistake in identity, and captured the ship. Ranger and Providence followed suit. Ten more ships were cut out of the convoy, their total value approaching $1 million.

== Defense of Charleston ==
In 1780, Rathbun took Queen of France south in Commodore Abraham Whipple's force to bolster the defenses of Charleston, South Carolina. There, with smaller ships, she was stationed in the Ashley River to prevent British forces under Cornwallis from crossing and attacking the city. As the American position weakened, Queen of France's guns were removed and she was sunk as a block ship. Her crew then went ashore and Rathbun served as an artilleryman until the city fell in May 1780.

== Privateer ==
Taken prisoner at the fall of Charleston, Rathbun and the other American captains were paroled and allowed to return to New England. There, he found that the Continental Navy had dwindled and no commands were available. Thereupon, Rathbun secured a commission from Congress on 4 August to command the Massachusetts privateer brig Wexford. About two weeks later, he set sail from Boston bound for St. George's Channel near Britain and, within another six weeks reached the coast of Ireland. There, less than 100 miles from Cape Clear, he ran afoul of the 32-gun frigate HMS Recovery. Following a 24-hour chase during which HMS Recovery fired at least one broadside, Rathbun and his ship were captured by the British warship.

Incarcerated first at Kinsale Prison near Cork, Ireland, Rathbun was later transferred to Mill Prison or Old Mill Prison in Plymouth, England, where he died on 20 June 1782.

== Namesakes ==
Two ships, USS Rathburne, were named for him. Although his name was spelled Rathburne or Rathbourne in official records, including the two warships named after him, this was an error. His name was Rathbun.
