= List of frigate classes by country =

The list of frigates by country includes all modern (post–1940) frigates organized by the country of which they were in service.

== Argentina (Armada de la República Argentina) ==
- Azopardo class - 2 ships (1957–1973)
- Almirante Brown class - 4 ships in service 1983
- Espora class - 6 ships in service 1985

== Australia (Royal Australian Navy) ==
- River class - 6 ships (all 6 decommissioned)
- Adelaide class - 6 ships (all 6 decommissioned)
- Anzac class - 8 ships built 1993–2004
- Hunter class - 9 ships ordered

== Bangladesh (Bangladesh Navy) ==
- Umar Faruq class - 2 ship (ex-British Salisbury class) (1978–2016)
- Osman class - 1 ship (ex-Chinese 'Jianghu I' class) (1989–2020)
- Bangabandhu class - 1 ship (Ulsan Class) (2001–present)
- Abu Bakr class - 2 ships (Type 053H2 Class Frigate) (2013–present)
- Hamilton class - 2 ships (ex- USCGC Jarvis and USCGC Rush) (2013–present)

== Belgium ==
- Wielingen class - 4 ships (sold to Bulgaria or decommissioned)

== Brazil ==
- Greenhalgh class - 1 ship active (ex-UK Broadsword class (Batch 1))
- Niteroi class - 6 ships built (1975–86)
- Tamandaré-class frigate - 2 ships built, 1 active
- Para class - all retired

== Bulgaria ==
- Koni class - 1 ship (ex-Russian Delfin)
- Wielingen class - 3 ships (in Bulgarian Navy often designated as Drazki (Daring) class)

== Canada (Royal Canadian Navy) ==
- River class — 60 ships (1943–1947, decommissioned)
  - Prestonian class — 21 ships converted from mothballed River classes (1953–1967, decommissioned)
- Loch class — 3 ships (1944–1945, returned to the UK)
- Halifax class — 12 ships (1992–present)

== Chile (Armada de Chile) ==
- Type 22 Boxer class (Batch 2) - 1 ship, 2003
- Jacob van Heemskerck class - 2 ships, 2006
- Karel Doorman class - 2/2 ships, 2006, 2007
- Type 23 Duke class — 2/3 ships 2006, 2007, 2008

== China (People's Liberation Army Navy) ==
- Zuhai class - 1 ship
- Jinan class - 15 ships
- Type 053H/H1 Xiamen (Jianghu I/II) class - 21 ships
- Type 053H2 Huangshi (Jianghu III) class - 3 ships
- Type 053HT-H Siping (Jianghu IV) class - 1 ship
- Type 053H1G Zigong (Jianghu V) class - 6 ships
- Type 053H2G Anqing (Jiangwei) class - 4 ships
- Type 053H3 (Jiangwei II) class - 8 ships
- Type 054 (Jiangkai I) class - 2 ships
- Type 054A (Jiangkai II) class - 22 ships (2 more are fitting out, and another 2 are under construction)
- Type 054B class

== Colombia (Armada Nacional de Colombia) ==
- Almirante Padilla class - 4 ships

== Cuba ==
- Tacoma class - 3 ships
- Koni class - 3 ships
- Rio Damuji class - 2 ships

== Denmark (Søværnet) ==
- Holger Danske class - 2 ships (ex-Canadian River class)
- Esbern Snare class - 3 ships (ex-British Hunt Type II class)
- Hvidbjørnen-class OPV - 4 ships, classed as ocean patrol frigates.
  - Beskytteren-ocean patrol frigate OPV. (classed as ocean patrol frigates). Later sold to Estonia and renamed EML Admiral Pitka (A230)
- Peder Skram class - 2 ships
- Thetis-class ocean patrol frigate- - 4 ships
- Absalon-class flexible support ship - 2 ships. (Arguably a support ship, armed as a frigate)
- Iver Huitfeldt class - 3 ships

== Ecuador ==
- Eloy Alfaro class - 2 ships (ex-British Leander class)

== Egypt ==
- Mubarak class - 4 ships (ex-US Oliver Hazard Perry class)
- FREMM Aquitaine class - 1 ship
- FREMM Bergamini class - 2 ships
- MEKO 200 class - 4 ships
- Damyat class - 2 ships (ex-US Knox class)
- Najim al Zafir class - 2 ships (ex-Chinese 'Jianghu' class)
- El Fateh class - 1 ship (ex-British destroyer Zenith)
- Tariq class - 1 ship (ex-British sloop Whimbrel)

== France (Marine Nationale) ==
- Commandant Rivière class - All 9 ships retired in 1996
- Suffren class - All 2 anti-air ships retired in 2008
- Tourville class - All 3 anti-submarine ships retired in 2013
- Cassard class - All 2 anti-air ships retired in 2021
- Georges Leygues class - All 7 anti-submarine ships retired in 2022
- Floreal class - 6 ships in service
- La Fayette class - 5 ships in service
- Aquitaine class - 8 multipurpose ships in service
- Horizon class - 2 anti-air ships in service
- Amiral Ronarc'h class - 1 multipurpose ship in commissioning in 2025 and 5 expected

== Germany (Deutsche Marine) ==
- F120 Köln class - 6 ships retired
- F122 Bremen class - 8 ships retired
- F123 Brandenburg class - 4 ships 1990's
- F124 Sachsen class - 3 newest heavy frigate (replacing destroyers)
- F125 Baden-Württemberg class - 4 ships, in service by 2017 (replacing Bremen class)
- F126 MKS-180 (Mehrzweckkampfschiff 180) - 4 ordered, 2 in option, to enter service by 2028, to replace the F123 Brandenburg-class.
- F127 Future Air Defender - 4 to be ordered and replace the F124 Sachsen-class frigate, to enter service in the 2030s.

== Greece (Hellenic Navy) ==
- Elli class - 10 ships (ex-Dutch Kortenaer class)
- Hydra class - 4 ships commissioned 1992–98
- Kimon class - building ongoing, 4 ships expected in 2028

== India (Indian Navy) ==
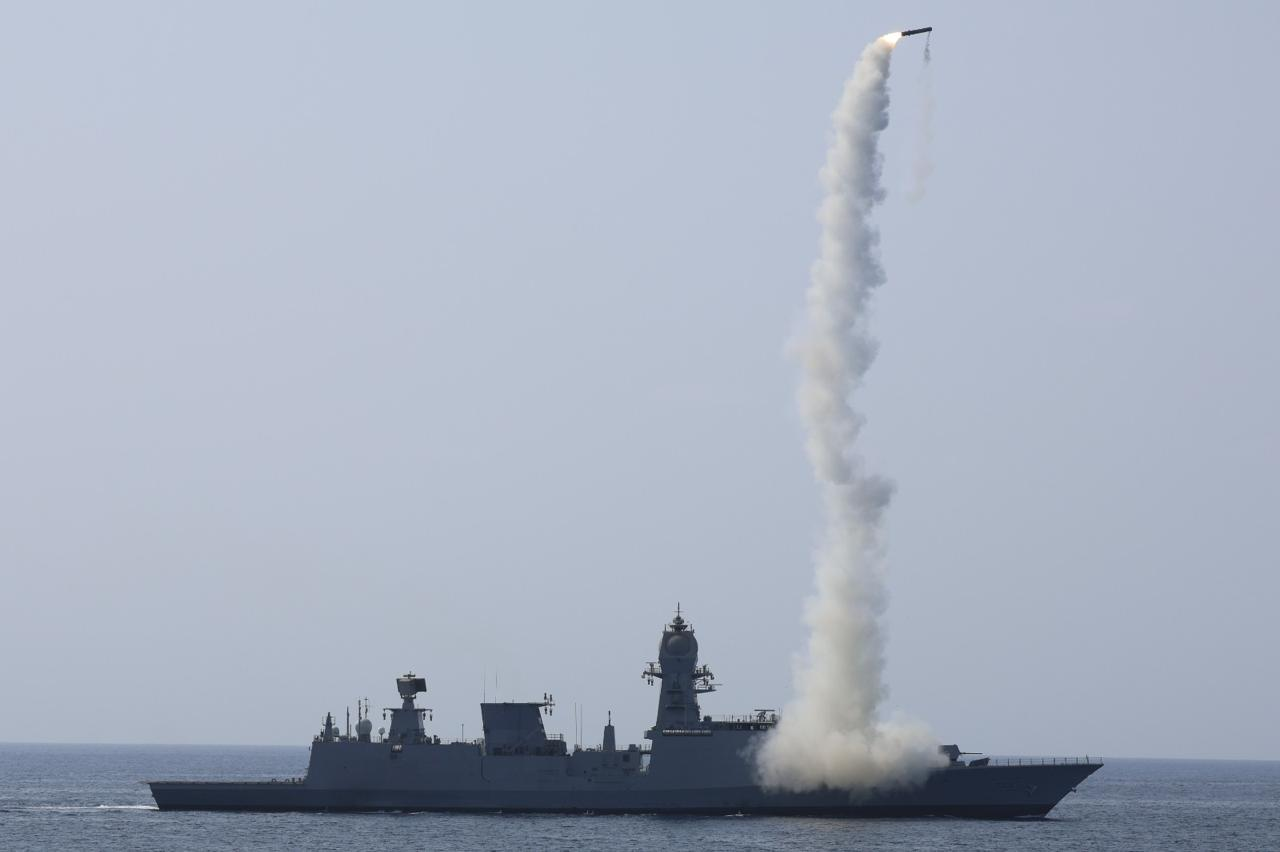
Nilgiri firing BrahMos supersonic cruise missile

- Type 14 Blackwood class - 3 decommissioned
- Type 12 Whitby class - 2 decommissioned
- Type 41 Leopard class - 3 decommissioned
- Nilgiri-class frigate - 6 decommissioned
- Godavari-class frigate - 3 decommissioned
- Brahmaputra-class frigate - 3 active
- Talwar class - 8 active, 2 under construction
- Shivalik-class frigate - 3 active
- Nilgiri-class frigate (2019) - 1 active, 6 under construction
- Project 17B-class frigate - 8 planned

== Indonesia (Tentara Nasional Indonesia-Angkatan Laut) ==
- Riga class – 8 ships, retired 1973–1986
- Samadikun class – 4 ships (ex-US Claud Jones class), retired 2001–2009
- Martha Khristina Tiyahahu class – 3 ships (ex-UK Tribal class), retired 2000
- Ahmad Yani class – 6 ships (ex-Dutch Van Speijk class), 1 ship retired in 2019
- Martadinata class – 2 ships, (modified Sigma class), frigate variant
- Brawijaya class – 2 ships, (Thaon di Revel-class)
- Balaputradewa class – 2 ships (1 under construction), (Arrowhead 140 frigate)
- İstif-class frigate – 2 ships under construction

== Iran ==
- Alvand class - 3 ships, all sunk
- Moudge class - 4 ships, all sunk (2 more under construction)

== Iraq (Iraqi Navy) ==
- Ibn Khaldoum class - 1 ship, sunk in 2003
- Lupo class - 4 ships planned, seized by Italy

== Italy (Marina Militare) ==
- Centauro class - 4 ships decommissioned
- Bergamini class - 4 ships decommissioned
- Alpino class - 2 ships decommissioned
- Lupo class - 4 ships decommissioned
- Maestrale class - 8 ships decommissioned
- Soldati class - 4 ships, originally built for Iraq decommissioned
- FREMM Bergamini class - 12
- Thaon di Revel-class - 7

== Japan (Japanese Maritime Self-Defense Force) ==
- Wakaba class - 1 ship decommissioned 1971
- Asahi class - 2 ship all decommissioned 1975
- Akebono class - 1 ship decommissioned 1976
- Ikazuchi class - 2 ships decommissioned 1976 & 1977
- Isuzu class - 4 ships all decommissioned 1991 to 1993
- Chikugo class - 11 ships all decommissioned 1996 to 2003
- Ishikari class - 1 ship decommissioned 2007
- Yūbari class - 2 ships all decommissioned 2010
- Abukuma class - 6 ships commissioned 1989 to 1993
- Mogami class - 4 ships in construction as of September 2021

== Libya (Libyan Navy) ==
- Dat Assawari 1 ship commissioned 1973 (scrapped)
- Koni class 2 ships (1 in service)

== Malaysia (Royal Malaysian Navy) ==
- Maharaja Lela - 5 ships (6 planned, 4 building, 1 cancelled)
- Lekiu class - 2 ships
- Hang Tuah class - 1 ship (retired)
- Loch class — 1 ship (retired)
- Rahmat class - 1 ship (retired)

== Mexico ==
- Allende class - 4 ships (ex-US Knox class)
- Bravo class - 2 ships (ex-US Bronstein class)

== Montenegro ==
- Kotor class - 2 ships

== Morocco ==
- Mohammed V class - 2 ships (Floreal class)

== Myanmar (Myanmar Navy) ==
- River class - 1 ship (ex-UK HMS Fal)
- Mahar Bandoola class - 2 ships (Type 053H1 class)
- Aung Zeya class - 1 ship
- Kyan Sittha - 2 ships
- King Thalun - 1 ship

== Netherlands (Koninklijke Marine) ==
- Van Amstel class - 6 ships, 1954 (former United States Navy Cannon class)
- Van Speijk class - 6 ships, 1967-1968 (modified Leander class)
- Tromp class - 2 ships, 1975–1976
- Kortenaer class - 10 ships, 1978–1983
- Jacob van Heemskerck class - 2 ships, 1986
- Karel Doorman class - 8 ships, 1991–1995
- De Zeven Provinciën class - 4 ships, 2001–2005

== New Zealand (Royal New Zealand Navy) ==
- Loch class — 6 ships - decommissioned
- Anzac-class frigate - 2 ships - in service since 1997
- Type 12W - 1 ship - decommissioned
- Type 12M - 2 ships - decommissioned
- Type 12L (Leander class) - 4 ships - decommissioned

== Norway (Royal Norwegian Navy) ==
- Oslo class - 5 ships all decommissioned
- Fridtjof Nansen class, modified version of Álvaro de Bazán class - 5 ships delivered (2011)

== North Korea ==
- Soho class - 1 ship
- Najin class - 2 ships

== Pakistan (Pak Behria) ==
- Tariq class - 6 ships (ex-UK Amazon class) - 2 decommissioned
- Zulfiquar class - 4 ships
- Type 054AP/Tughril-class Frigate - 4 ships
- Jinnah class - 4 being built
- Alamgir class - 1 ship (ex-US (Oliver Hazard Perry class))

== Peru (Marina de Guerra del Perú) ==
- Modified Lupo class - 4 ships
- Lupo class - 4 ships

== Philippines (Hukbong Dagat ng Pilipinas) ==
- Buckley class - 1 ship (1960–1964) all retired
- Datu Kalantiaw class - 3 ships (1967–2018) all retired
- Edsall class - 1 ship (1976–1988) all retired
- Andrés Bonifacio class - 4 ships (1976–1993) all retired
- Gregorio del Pilar class - 3 ships (2011–present) Patrol Frigate
- Jose Rizal class - 2 ships (2020–present)
- Miguel Malvar class - 2 ships
- Future Philippine Horizon 3 frigate|Re-horizon 3 program|3 ships|(HDF-3500 from HHI, Istanbul-class frigate from Turkey, Navantia F110 frigate, ALPHA-5000 Navantia)

|

== Poland (Marynarka Wojenna) ==
- General K. Pulaski class - 2 ships (ex-US Oliver Hazard Perry class)

== Portugal Navy (Marinha Portuguesa) ==
- Joao Belo class - 3 ships
- Vasco da Gama class - 3 ships
- Bartolomeu Dias-class frigate - 2 ships
- Admiral Pereira da Silva class - 3 ships

== Romania (Forțele Navale Române) ==
- Type 22 class - 2 ships
- Mărăşeşti class - 1 ship
- Rear-Admiral Eustațiu Sebastian class - 2 ships

== Russia/USSR (Voyenno- Morskoy Flot) ==
- Admiral Grigorovich class - 4 ships (6 planned)
- Admiral Gorshkov class - 3 ships (8 planned)
- Neustrashimy class - 2 ships.
- Legky class - 2 ships
- Bessmenny class - 10 ships; possible 4 still active as of 2008
- Bditelny class - 19 ships; possibly 4 still active as of 2008
- Koni class - 1 ship sold to Bulgaria
- Mirka class - 18 ships all decommissioned
- Petya class - 37 ships 8 still active as of 2008; 6 Vietnamese & 2 Syrian.
- Riga class - 68 ships built 1950's sold to various navies
- Kola class - 8 ships all decommissioned
- Gepard class - 2 ship in service

== Saudi Arabia (Saudi Navy) ==
- Al Riyadh class - 3 ships building (a version of the La Fayette class)
- Al Madinah class - 4 ships

== Singapore (Republic of Singapore Navy) ==
- Formidable class - 6 ships commissioned 2007–2009

== South Africa (South African Navy) ==
- Loch class — 3 ships (no longer in service)
- President class - 3 ships (no longer in service - 1 sunk & 2 scrapped)
- Valour class - 4 ships (also known as MEKO A200SAN)

== South Korea (Republic of Korea Navy) ==
- "Chungnam"class - 6 ship being built
- Incheon class - 6 ships
- Daegu class - 8 ships
- Ulsan class - 9 ships

== Spain (Armada Española) ==
- Marte class - 2 ships
- Jupiter class - 2 ships
- Eolo class - 2 ships
- Pizarro class - 8 ships
- Atrevida class - 6 ships
- Baleares class - 5 ships (modified Knox class)
- Santa Maria class - 6 ships (Oliver Hazard Perry class, built in Ferrol, Spain.)
- Álvaro de Bazán class - 5 ships

== Republic of China (Taiwan) (Republic of China Navy) ==
- Cheng Kung class - 7 ships
- Kang Ding class - 6 ships
- Chi Yang class - 8 ships (ex-US Knox class)
- Chien Yang class - 12 ships
- Tuo Chiang class corvette

== Thailand (Royal Thai Navy) ==
- Pin Klao class - 1 ship
- Makut Rajakumarn class - 1 ship
- Chao Phraya class - 2 ships (Type 053HT class)
- Kraburi class - 2 ships (Type 053HT-H class)
- Phutthayotfa Chulalok class - 2 ships (Knox class)
- Naresuan class - 2 ships
- Bhumibol Adulyadej class - 1 ship

== Turkey (Türk Deniz Kuvvetleri) ==
- Gabya class - 9 ships
- İstif class - 8 ships
- Muavenet class - 8 ships
  - Tepe class - 4 ships
- Barbaros class - 2 ships
  - Salihreis class - 2 ships
- Yavuz class - 4 ships
- Berk class - 2 ships

== Ukraine (Ukrainian Navy) ==
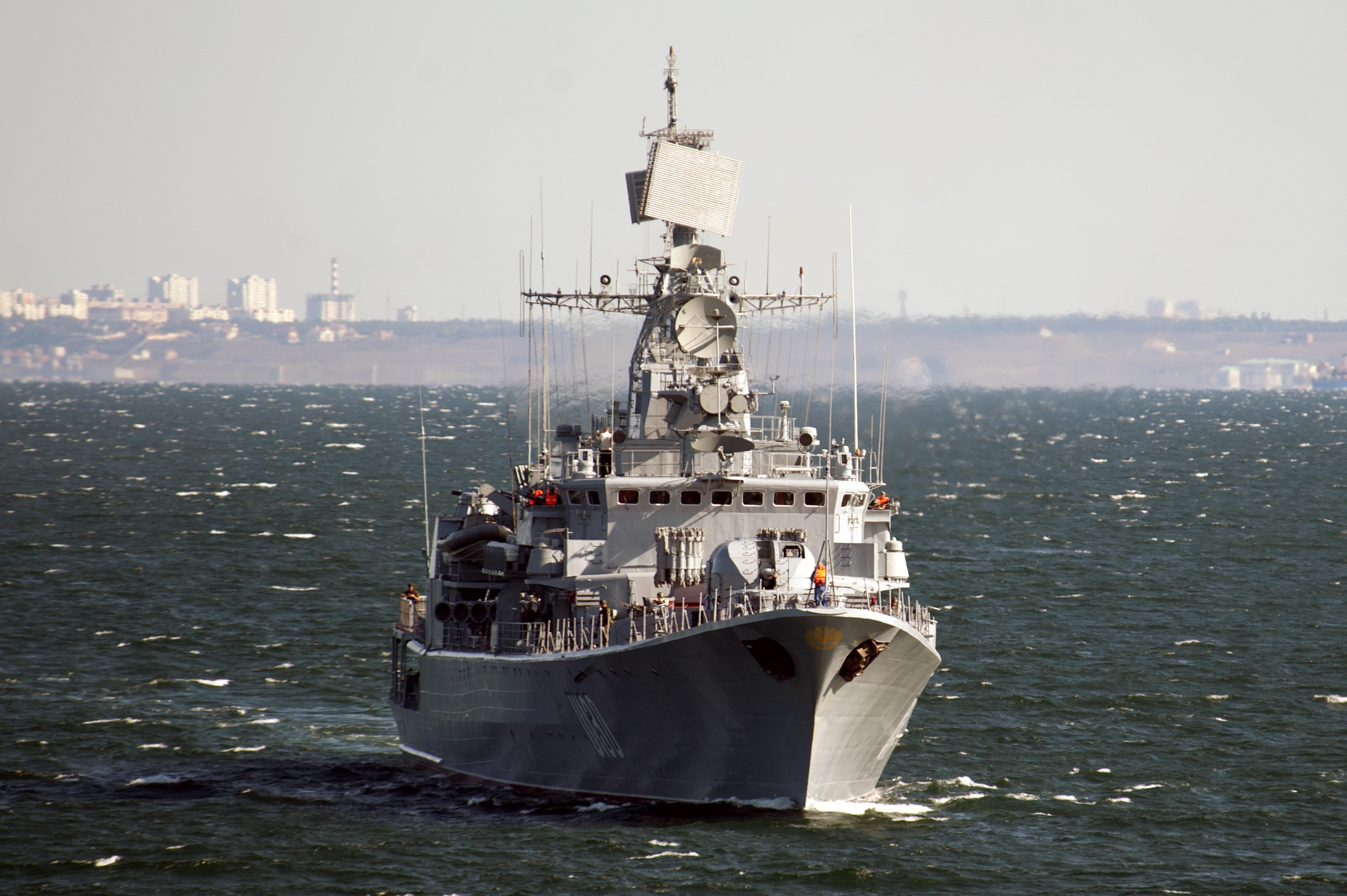
The Krivak class frigate Hetman Sahaydachniy is the current flagship of the Ukrainian navy.

- Krivak-class frigate — 1 ship (scuttled in 2022 during the Russian invasion of Ukraine to prevent capture)

== United Kingdom (Royal Navy) ==
- River class — 151 ships
- Colony class — 21 ships
- Captain class — 78 ships
- Loch class — 24 ships
- Bay class — 21 ships
- Type 15 class— 23 ships
- Type 16 class— 10 ships
- Type 41 Leopard class — 4 ships
- Type 61 Salisbury class — 4 ships
- Type 12 Whitby class — 6 ships
- Type 12I Rothesay class — 9 ships
- Type 14 Blackwood class — 12 ships
- Type 81 Tribal class — 7 ships
- Type 12M Leander class (Batch 1) - 8 ships
- Type 12M Leander class (Batch 2) - 8 ships
- Type 12M broad-beamed Leander class (Batch 3) - 10 ships
- Type 21 Amazon class — 8 ships
- Type-22 Broadsword class (Batch 1) - 4 ships
- Type-22 Boxer class (Batch 2) - 6 ships
- Type-22 Cornwall class (Batch 3) - 4 ships
- Type 23 Duke class — 16 ships
- Type 26 class
- Type 31 class

== United States (United States Navy) ==
- United States class - 6 original frigates of the US Navy 1797 to present (USS Constitution)
- Bronstein class - 2 FF ships 1963 (Transfer to Mexico actual ARM Bravo Class)
- Garcia class - 10 FF ships and 1 AGFF ship 1964 to 1968
- Brooke class - 6 FFG ships 1966 to 1968
- Knox class - 46 FF ships 1969 to 1974
- Oliver Hazard Perry class - 51 FFG ships 1977 to 1989
- Constellation class - 1 ship on order with 20 being planned total

== Uruguay (National Navy of Uruguay) ==
- Uruguay class - 3 ships

== Venezuela (Bolivarian Armada of Venezuela) ==
- Mariscal Sucre class - 6 ships (ex-Italian Lupo class)

== Vietnam (Vietnamese People's Navy) ==
- Phạm Ngũ Lão (HQ-01) - 1 ship (ex-seaplane tender)
- Petya class - 5 ships
- Gepard 3.9 class - 4 ships in service (all delivered)

== Yugoslavia SFR Yugoslav Navy ==
- Koni class - 2 ships
- Kotor class - 2 ships

== See also ==
- List of frigate classes
- List of corvette classes
