= List of frigate classes =

This list of frigate classes includes all post–World War II frigate classes listed alphabetically.

Frigate class	Number of ships	Notes
== A ==
Absalon	2	
Abukuma	6	
Aconit	1	
Adelaide	6	derivative of Oliver Hazard Perry class
Admiral Gorshkov	3	
Admiral Grigorovich	3	
Admiral Pereira da Silva	3	
Admiral Pitka	1	
Ahmad Yani	6	ex-Dutch Van Speijk class
Akebono	1	
Al-Aziz	1	MEKO 200 design, three under construction
Al Madinah	4	
Al Riyadh	3	
Aldebaran	4	ex-US Cannon class
Allende	4	ex-US Knox class
Almirante Brown	4	MEKO 360 design
Almirante Padilla	4	built in Germany
Alpino	2	
Alvand	4	built in Britain for the Iranian Navy
Álvaro de Bazán	5	
Amiral Petre Barbuneanu	4	
Andrés Bonifacio	4	modified ex-US Casco class, all decommissioned
Anzac	10	MEKO 200 design, built by Tenix in Williamstown, Vic, Australia
Aradu	1	MEKO 360 design
Artigliere	4	
Asahi	2	ex-US Cannon class
Aung Zeya	1	built in Myanmar
Azopardo	2	
== B ==
Baden-Württemberg	4	
Baleares	5	modified Knox class
Bangabandhu	1	modified Ulsan class
Baptista de Andrade	4	
Barbaros	4	MEKO 200 design
Barroso	1	
Bay	21	
Bditelny	19	see Burevestnik class
Beograd	2	
Bergamini	4	
Berk	2	
Bessmennyy	10	
Bhumibol Adulyadej	1	
Brahmaputra	3	built by GRSE; Indian Navy: 2000–present
Brandenburg	4	
Bravo	2	
Bremen	8	
Bronstein	2	FF 1963
Brooke	6	FFG 1966 to 1968
Bung Tomo	3	
Burevestnik	40	
== C ==
Canterbury (Leander)	2	
Captain	78	US built destroyer escorts
Cassard	2	
Centauro	4	
Chao Phraya	4	Chinese Jianghu III class
Chengdu	4	
Cheng Kung	8	
Chi Yang	8	ex-US Knox class
Chien Yang	12	
Chikugo	11	
Claud Jones	4	
Commandant Rivière	9	French built, decommissioned 3 ships sold to Uruguay
Condell	4	British built Leander class
Constellation	2 (planned)	
Contre-Amiral Eustatiu Sebastian	2	
== D ==
D'Estienne d'Orves	17	
Daegu	8	
Damyat	2	ex-US Knox class
Dat Assawari	1	Vosper Mk 7 design
Datu Kalantiaw	3	ex-US Cannon class
De Zeven Provinciën	4	
Dealey	13	
Dewantara	2	training ship
== E ==
El Fateh	1	ex-British destroyer Zenith
Elli	10	ex-Dutch Kortenaer class
Eloy Alfaro	2	ex-British Leander class
Eolo	2	
Erradii	2	MEKO 200 design
Espora	6	MEKO 140 design
== F ==
Fatahillah	3	
Floréal	6	
Formidable	6	
FREMM	22+(24)	twenty-seven planned
Fridtjof Nansen	5	derivative of Álvaro de Bazán class
== G ==
Gabya	8	ex-US Oliver Hazard Perry class
Garcia	11	10 FF and 1 AGFF ship, 1964–1968
General K. Pulaski	2	ex-US Oliver Hazard Perry class
Georges Leygues	7	
Gepard	6	
Godavari	3	built by MDL; Indian Navy: 1983–present
Good Hope	3	derivative of D'Estienne d'Orves class
Greenhalgh	4	ex-UK Broadsword class (Batch 1)
Gregorio del Pilar	3	ex-US Hamilton class
Gremyashchiy	1	
== H ==
Halifax	12	
Hamilton	12	
Hang Tuah	1	
Horizon	4	
Hydra	4	MEKO 200 design
== I ==
Ikazuchi	2	
Incheon	6	
Inhauma	4	
Ipiros	1	ex-US Knox class; two others decommissioned
Ishikari	1	
Isuzu	4	
Iver Huitfeldt	3	
== J ==
Jacob van Heemskerck	2	1986
João Belo	3	
João Coutinho	6	
Jose Rizal	2	
Jupiter	2	
== K ==
Kang Ding	6	
Karel Doorman	8	1991–1995
Kasturi	2	
Knox	46	46 FF, 1969–1974
Kola	8	
Köln	6	
Koni	14	
Kotor	2	
Kortenaer	12	1978–1983
Krivak	40	See Burevestnik class.
Kyan Sittha	2	
== L ==
La Fayette	5	
Le Corse	4	
Le Normand	14	
Leander	44	
Legend	9	
Legkiy	2	
Lekiu	2	
Loch	32	
Lupo	4	
== M ==
Maestrale	8	
Maharaja Lela		2 + 4
Makut Rajakumarn	1	
Mărășești	1	
Mariscal Sucre	6	
Martadinata	2	Sigma-class design
Marte	2	
Martha Khristina Tiyahahu	3	ex-UK Tribal class, all decommissioned
Meliton Carvajal	4	Italian-built Lupo class
Mirka	18	
Mohammed V	2	Floréal class
Mogami	3	
Moudge	5	Iranian built
Mubarak	4	ex-US Oliver Hazard Perry class
== N ==
Najim al Zafir	2	Chinese Jianghu III class
Najin	2	
Naresuan	2	
Neustrashimyy	2	
Nilgiri	6	built by MDL; Indian Navy: 1972–2010
Niterói	7	
== O ==
Obuma	1	
Oliver Hazard Perry	26	2 with the Polish Navy (as General K. Pulaski class), 4 with the Egyptian Navy (as Mubarak class), 1 with the Royal Bahrain Naval Forces, 8 with the Turkish Navy (as Gabya class), 1 with Pakistan Navy (as Alamgir class) and 10 with the United States Navy
Oslo	5	
== P ==
Para	4	
Peder Skram	2	
Petya	54	
Pham Ngu Lao	1	former seaplane tender
Phutthayotfa Chulalok	2	ex-US Knox class
Pizarro	8	
Prestonian	21	modified River class
== R ==
Rahmat	1	decommissioned 2004 and retired
Reformador	1	Sigma-class design
Regele Ferdinand	2	ex-UK Type 22 frigate
Riga	69	
Rio Damuji	2	
River	6	
Roofdier	6	
== S ==
Sachsen	3	
Samadikun	4	ex-US Claud Jones-class destroyer escort
Santa María	6	Spanish subclass of US Oliver Hazard Perry class
SF3000	(2)	two planned
Shivalik	3	built by MDL; Indian Navy: 2010–present
Soho	1	
Suffren	2	
Sultan Moulay Ismail	2	Sigma-class design
== T ==
Talwar	6	Indian Navy: 2003–present
Tarik Ben Ziyad	1	Sigma-class design
Tariq	1	ex-British sloop Whimbrel
Tariq	6	ex-UK Amazon class
Thaon di Revel	7+(2)	
Thetis	4	
Tourville	3	
Tromp	2	1975–1976
Tughril	2	
Type 053H (Jianghu I)	14	
Type 053H1 (Jianghu II)	9	
Type 053H2 (Jianghu III)	3	
Type 053H1Q (Jianghu IV)	1	
Type 053H1G (Jianghu V)	6	
Type 053K (Jiangdong)	2	
Type 053H2G (Jiangwei I)	4	
Type 053H3 (Jiangwei II)	10	
Type 054 (Jiangkai I)	2	
Type 054A (Jiangkai II)	30	
Type 12 Whitby	8	
Type 12M Rothesay	21	
Type 12I Leander	26	
Type 12I Canterbury	2	New Zealand variant of Leander class
Type 14 Blackwood	15	
Type 15	23	converted War Emergency Programme destroyers
Type 16	10	converted War Emergency Programme destroyers
Type 21 Amazon	8	
Type 22 Broadsword (Batch 1)	4	
Type 22 Boxer (Batch 2)	6	
Type 22 Cornwall (Batch 3)	4	
Type 23 Duke	16	
Type 41 Leopard	7	
Type 61 Salisbury	4	
Type 81 Tribal	7	
== U ==
Ulsan	9	
Uruguay	3	ex-French Commandant Rivière class
== V ==
Valour class	4	
Van Amstel	6	ex-US Cannon class
Van Speijk	6	1967–1968 modernised Leander class
Vasco da Gama	3	MEKO 200 design
Visby	4	
== W ==
Wakaba	1	modified Tachibana class
Wele Nzas	1	
Wielingen	3	
== Y ==
Yavuz	4	MEKO 200 design
Yūbari	2	
== Z ==
Zagreb	2	
Zulfiquar	4	

== Bibliography ==
- Saunders, Stephen, ed. (2004). Jane's Fighting Ships 2004–2005. Coulsdon, UK: Jane's Information Group. ISBN 0-7106-2623-1.
