= JDS Ikazuchi (DE-202) =

Ikazuchi-class destroyer escort

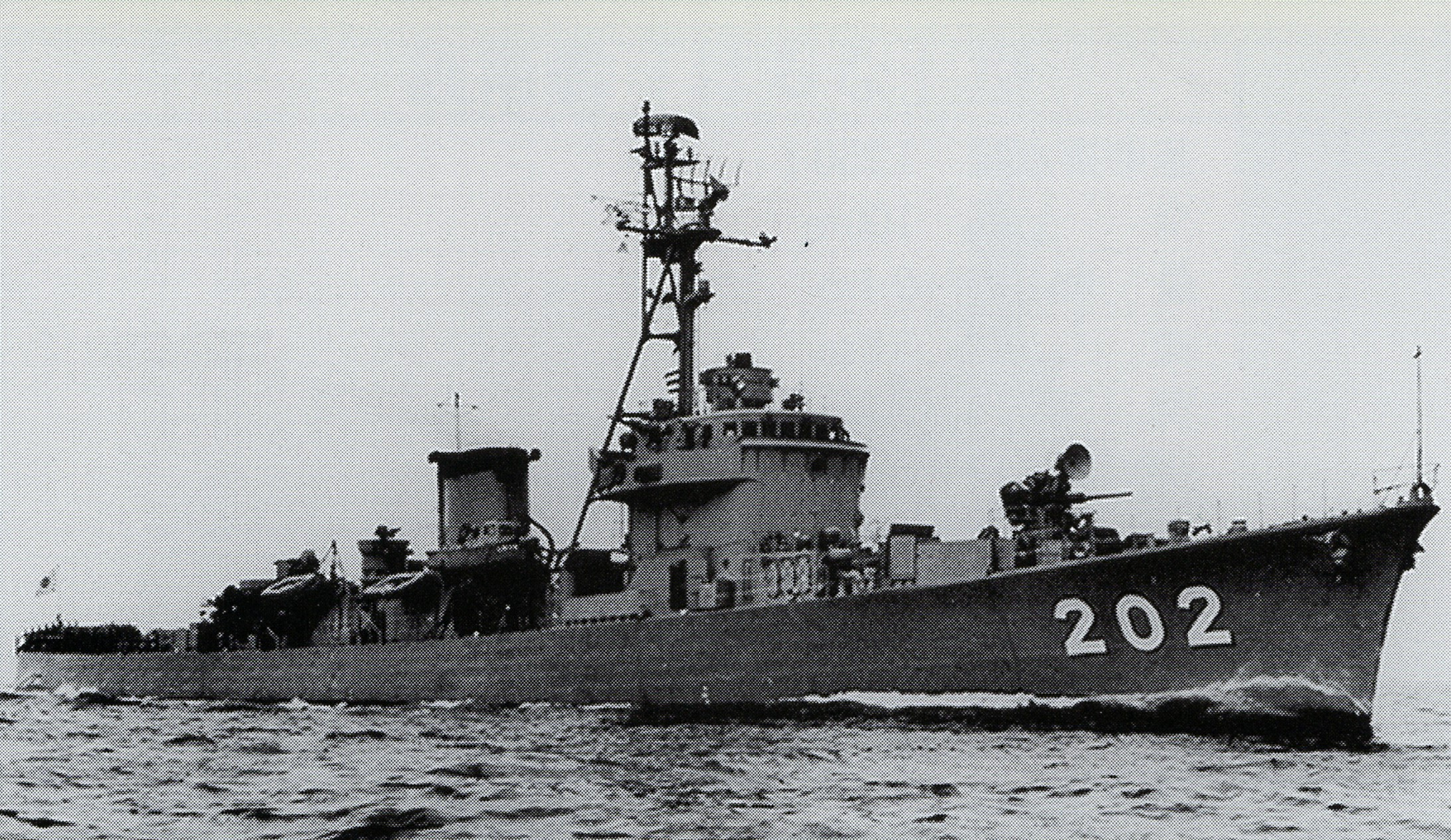
- JDS Ikazuchi

History

Japan
- Name: Ikazuchi; (いかづち)
- Namesake: Ikazuchi (1931)
- Ordered: 1953
- Builder: Kawasaki, Kobe
- Laid down: 18 December 1954
- Launched: 6 September 1955
- Commissioned: 29 May 1956
- Decommissioned: 31 March 1976
- Stricken: 30 March 1983
- Home port: Kure (1956-1976); Etajima (1976-1983)
- Identification: Pennant number: DE-202, YAC-30
- Fate: Scrapped

General characteristics
- Class & type: Ikazuchi-class destroyer escort
- Displacement: 1,080 long tons (1,097 t) standard
- Length: 87.5 m (287.1 ft)
- Beam: 8.7 m (28.5 ft)
- Draught: 3.01 m (9.9 ft)
- Propulsion: 2 × diesel engines, 2 shafts
- Speed: 25 knots
- Complement: 160
- Sensors & processing systems: OPS-2 air-search radar, OPS-3 surface-search radar, QHBa search sonar, QDA attack sonar
- Armament: 2 × 3"/50 caliber Mk.21 guns (Type 54); 4 × Bofors 40 mm anti-aircraft guns; 1 × Hedgehog anti-submarine mortar; 8 × K-gun depth charge throwers; 1 × Depth charge rack

JDS Ikazuchi (DE-202) is the lead ship of the Ikazuchi-class destroyer escort of Japan Maritime Self-Defense Force.

== Development and design ==
In FY1953, the Japanese government ordered three destroyer escorts, JDS Akebono and ships of this class. These vessels were the first indigenous post-World War II Japanese destroyer escorts, but their propulsion systems were different because the JMSDF tried to find the best way in the propulsion systems of future surface combatants. Akebono was a steam-powered vessel, but this class was diesel-powered vessels.

So equipment of this class were almost the same as those of Akebono, with two American 3"/50 caliber Mark 21 guns (or Type 54, the Japanese version) with two Mark 22 single mounts controlled by Mark 51 director each, four Bofors 40 mm anti-aircraft guns with two dual mounts, a Hedgehog anti-submarine mortar and eight K-gun depth charge throwers. In 1959, all Mark 21 guns were replaced by Mark 22 rapid-fire guns with Mark 34 single mounts and Mark 63 GFCS was introduced in exchange for the reduction of Bofors 40 mm guns.

== Construction and career ==
Ikazuchi was laid down on 18 December 1954 at Kawasaki Heavy Industries, Kobe and launched on 6 September 1955. She was commissioned on 29 May 1956. She was put into service and was incorporated into the Kure District Force.

On 1 August 1956, the 7th Escort Corps was newly formed under the 1st Escort Corps group and was incorporated together with JDS Akebono and JDS Inazuma.

A special refurbishment work was carried out at Kawasaki Heavy Industries Kobe Shipyard between 11 December 1958 and 25 March 1959, and the 54 type 50 caliber 3 inch single gun was replaced with the Mk.34 50 caliber 3 inch single quick-firing gun. The front 40mm twin gun was removed, the fire control system on the bridge was changed from Mk.51 to Mk.63, and the Mk.34 shooting radar was also installed. In addition, air conditioners were installed in the battle compartment rooms.

On 10 December 1964, the 7th Escort Corps was reorganized under the 3rd Escort Corps group.

On 15 March 1969, the 7th Escort Corps was reorganized under the Kure District Force.

On 31 March 1976, she was changed to a storage ship, and the ship registration number was changed to YAC-30. It was moored at the 1st Service School of the Maritime Self-Defense Force at Etajima and used as a berthing training ship.

She was stricken on 30 March 1983.
