= JDS Inazuma (DE-203) =

Ikazuchi-class destroyer escort

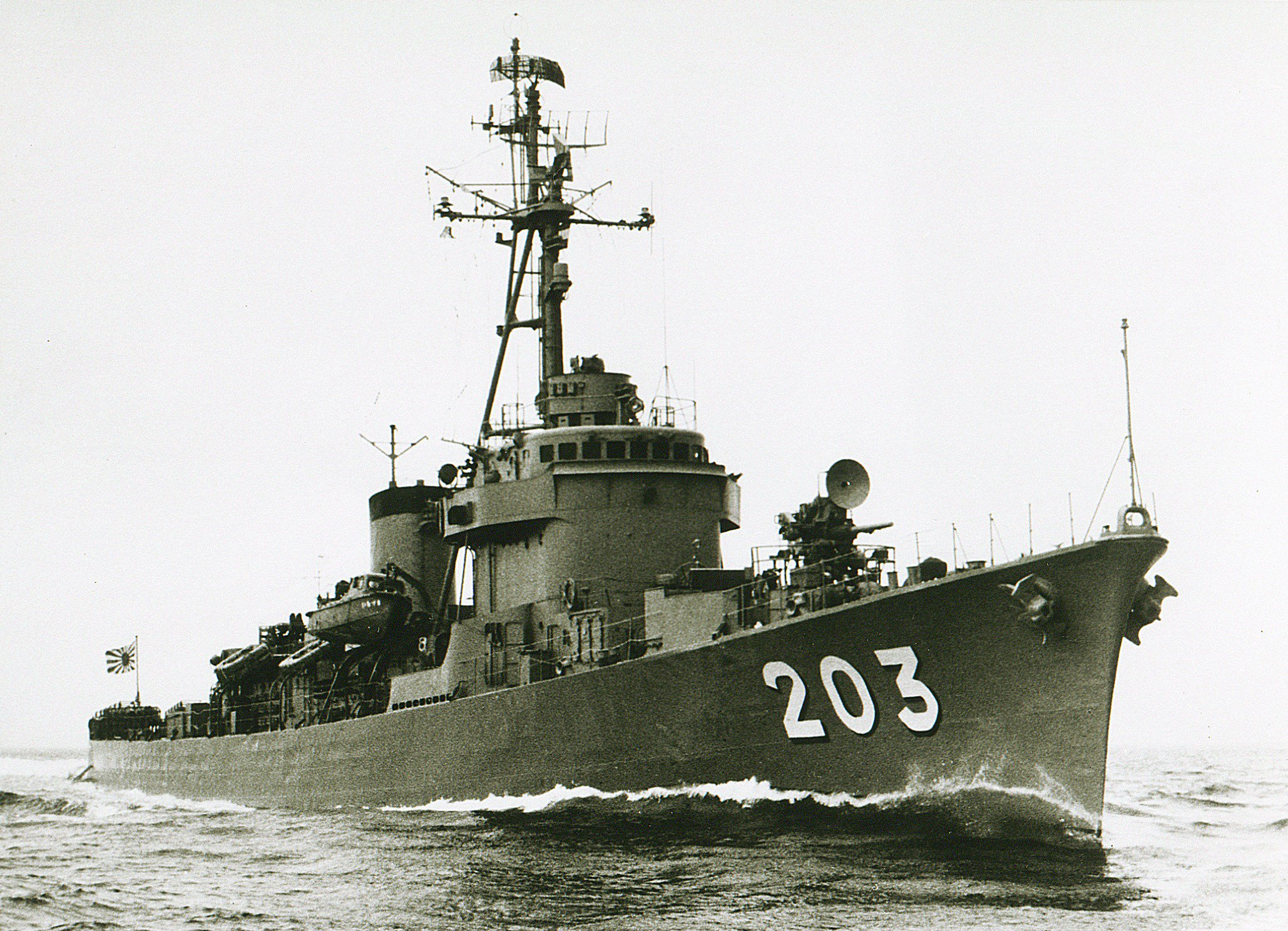
- JDS Inazuma

History

Japan
- Name: Inazuma; (いなづま)
- Ordered: 1953
- Builder: Mitsui, Tamano
- Laid down: 25 December 1954
- Launched: 4 August 1955
- Commissioned: 5 March 1956
- Decommissioned: 15 March 1977
- Stricken: 30 March 1983
- Home port: Kure (1956-1976); Etajima (1976-1983)
- Identification: Pennant number: DE-203, YAC-31
- Fate: Scrapped

General characteristics
- Class & type: Ikazuchi-class destroyer escort
- Displacement: 1,080 long tons (1,097 t) standard
- Length: 87.5 m (287 ft 1 in)
- Beam: 8.7 m (28 ft 7 in)
- Draught: 3.01 m (9 ft 11 in)
- Propulsion: 2 × diesel engines, 2 shafts
- Speed: 25 knots (46 km/h; 29 mph)
- Complement: 160
- Sensors & processing systems: OPS-2 air-search radar, OPS-3 surface-search radar, QHBa search sonar, QDA attack sonar
- Armament: 2 × 3"/50 caliber Mk.21 guns (Type 54); 4 × Bofors 40 mm anti-aircraft guns; 1 × Hedgehog anti-submarine mortar; 8 × K-gun depth charge throwers; 1 × Depth charge rack

JDS Inazuma (DE-203) is the second ship of the Ikazuchi-class destroyer escorts of the Japan Maritime Self-Defense Force (JMSDF).

== Development and design ==
In FY1953, the Japanese government ordered three destroyer escorts, JDS Akebono and two ships of Ikazuchi class. These vessels were the first indigenous post-World War II Japanese destroyer escorts, but their propulsion systems were different because the JMSDF tried to find the best way in the propulsion systems for its future surface combatants. Akebono was a steam-powered vessel, but the Ikazuchi class were diesel-powered vessels.

Equipment of the Ikazuchi class was almost the same as those of Akebono, with two American 3"/50 caliber Mark 21 guns (or Type 54, the Japanese version) in two Mark 22 single mounts controlled by a Mark 51 director each, four Bofors 40 mm anti-aircraft guns in two dual mounts, a Hedgehog anti-submarine mortar and eight K-gun depth charge throwers. In 1959, all the Mark 21 guns were replaced by Mark 22 rapid-fire guns with Mark 34 single mounts and Mark 63 GFCS introduced in exchange of the reduction of Bofors 40 mm guns.

== Construction and career ==
Inazuma was laid down on 25 December 1954 by Mitsui Engineering and Shipbuilding at their yard in Tamano and launched on 4 August 1955. The vessel was commissioned on 5 March 1956. She was put into service and incorporated into the Kure District Force.

On 1 August 1956, the 7th Escort Corps was newly formed under the 1st Escort Corps group and Inazuma was incorporated with Akebono and sister ship Ikazuchi.

A special refurbishment work was carried out by Kawasaki Heavy Industries at their Kobe Shipyard between 11 December 1958 and 25 March 1959, and the 54 type 50 caliber 3-inch (76 mm) single gun was replaced with the Mk.34 50 caliber 3-inch single quick-firing gun. The front 40 mm (1.6 in) twin gun was removed, the fire control system on the bridge was changed from Mk.51 to Mk.63, and the Mk.34 shooting radar was also installed. In addition, air conditioners were installed in the battle compartment rooms.

On 10 December 1964, the 7th Escort Corps was reorganized under the 3rd Escort Corps group. On 15 March 1969, the 7th Escort Corps was reorganized under the Kure District Force.

On 31 March 1976, the vessel was changed to a storage ship, and the ship registration number was changed to YAC-31. Inazuma was moored at the 1st Service School of the Maritime Self-Defense Force at Etajima and used as a berthing training ship.

She was stricken on 30 March 1983.
