= Nampo-class corvette =

North Korean warship class

Class overview
- Builders: Nampo Shipyard, No 28 Shipyard Najin
- Operators: Korean People's Navy
- Preceded by: Soho-class frigate
- Built: 2013-2014
- In commission: 2013-present
- Completed: 2
- Active: 2

General characteristics
- Type: Corvette
- Displacement: 1300 ~ 1500tons
- Length: 76 metres (249 ft)
- Beam: 11 metres (36 ft)
- Draught: 3.4 metres (11 ft)
- Propulsion: diesel
- Speed: unknown
- Range: unknown
- Complement: unknown
- Sensors & processing systems: unknown
- Armament: Missiles; 2x2 Kumsong-3 anti-ship & land-attack cruise missiles; short-range Igla surface-to-air missiles; Guns; OTO Melara 76 mm; 2 30mm gatlings AK-230 CIWS; 2-4 14.5x114 manned gatlings; Anti-submarine; 4 RBU-1200 five-tube fixed launchers; 2x2 533mm torpedo tubes
- Aircraft carried: 1 helicopter (likely with either Mil Mi-4 PL or Mil Mi-14 PL)
- Aviation facilities: helicopter pad only

The Nampo-class corvettes (or light frigates) are a class of warships built in North Korea. They were seen from satellite-photos in 2013 and are believed to be a replacement for the older Soho-class frigate. The class has some similarities to Myanmar Navy UMS Tabinshweht, an Anawrahta-class frigate.

Two known hulls have been launched: one on the Sea of Japan in Najin and one in Nampo for service in the Yellow Sea.

== Specification ==
Little is known of their features and weapons. One of the clear element is the presence of a helicopter-deck and possibly even a small hangar on the hull.

The only weapon system identified is anti-submarine rockets (RBU 1200 A/S mortars), thus making the corvette a response for the recent developments of the South Korean Navy in the field of submarines.

Further weapons could be added however, including guns and anti-ship missiles (such as the Kh-35, known to have been recently put in service in the KPN). The potential missile systems appears to be SAM and SSM.

By western standard, the ships should be considered corvettes, however they're also described as light frigates for their role.
