= No 28 Shipyard Najin =

No 28 Shipyard Najin is a shipbuilding company located north east of the Port of Najin in Rason, North Korea. It is believed to be one of a few shipyards in the port area.

The first reports of the shipyard came from then classified information in the 1980s from the CIA indicated a shipyard building a then 32m midget submarine and Taechong-class patrol boat/submarine chaser.

The company is believed to have built the Najin-class frigate, Soho-class frigate and one of the Nampo-class corvette used by the Korean People's Navy.

== See also ==
- Nampo Shipyard
