= USS John R. Perry =

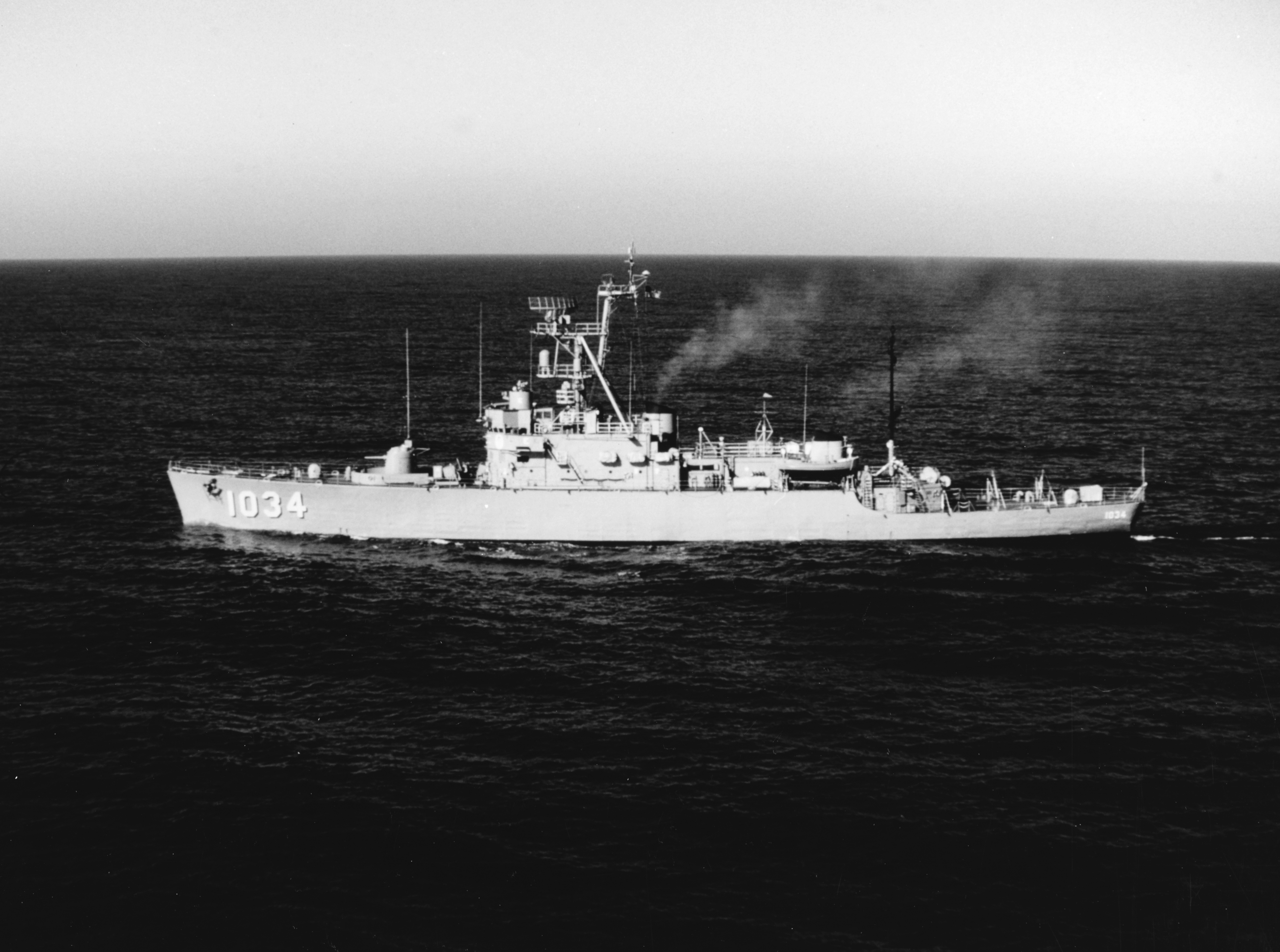

History

United States
- Name: USS John R. Perry
- Namesake: John Perry
- Builder: Avondale Marine Ways, Avondale, Louisiana
- Laid down: 1 October 1957
- Launched: 29 July 1958
- Sponsored by: Mrs. John R. Perry
- Commissioned: 5 May 1959
- Stricken: 20 February 1973
- Identification: Hull number: DE-1034
- Fate: Transferred to Indonesia, 1973

Indonesia
- Name: KRI Samadikun
- Namesake: Captain Samadikun
- Acquired: 1973
- Decommissioned: 2003
- Identification: Pennant number: 341
- Status: Decommissioned; awaiting disposal

General characteristics
- Class & type: Claud Jones-class destroyer escort
- Displacement: 1,314 long tons (1,335 t) standard; 1,970 long tons (2,000 t) full load
- Length: 312 ft (95 m)
- Beam: 38 ft 10 in (11.84 m)
- Draft: 12 ft 1 in (3.68 m)
- Propulsion: 4 × Fairbanks-Morse 38ND8 diesels; 9,240 shp (6,890 kW); 7,000 bhp (5,200 kW); 1 shaft
- Speed: 20–22 knots (37–41 km/h; 23–25 mph)
- Range: 7,000 nmi (13,000 km; 8,100 mi) at 12 kn (22 km/h; 14 mph)
- Complement: 171 total: 12 Officers; 159 enlisted men
- Electronic warfare & decoys: AN/SPS-6E-2D air search radar
- Armament: 2 × 3"/50 caliber guns (2 × 1); 6 × 12.75 in (324 mm) Mk.32 torpedo tubes (2 × 3); 2 × Hedgehog anti-submarine mortar; As KRI Samadikun; 1 × 3"/50 caliber gun (at bow); 6 × 12.75 in (324 mm) Mk.32 torpedo tubes (2 × 3); 2 × Hedgehog anti-submarine mortar; 1 x 37 mm V-11 twin-barrel AA gun (at stern); 1 x 25 mm 2M-3 twin-barrel AA gun (at stern)

USS John R. Perry (DE-1034) was a Claud Jones-class destroyer escort in the United States Navy. The ship was launched on 29 July 1958 and was commissioned on 5 May 1959. The vessel was used as a school ship for anti-submarine warfare on the United States East Coast until 1966, when John R. Perry transferred to the Pacific. The destroyer escort was struck from the Naval Vessel Register on 20 February 1973 and transferred to Indonesia. The vessel was renamed KRI Samadikun and initially given the pennant number D-1, before being reclassified DE-341 in 1982. Samadikun was decommissioned in 2003.

== Construction and career ==
John R. Perry was laid down on 1 October 1957 by Avondale Marine Ways in Avondale, Louisiana. The destroyer escort was launched on 29 July 1958, sponsored by Mrs. John R. Perry, widow of Rear Admiral John Perry. The vessel was commissioned on 5 May 1959.

John R. Perry made a shakedown cruise to Northern Europe and Scandinavian countries, thence sailed to Guantanamo Bay, Cuba. She then became a school ship for the Fleet Sonar School, basing at Key West, Florida, for anti-submarine warfare operations that took her to principal Caribbean and Gulf of Mexico ports, sailing as far east as the Azores, and up the eastern seaboard to Norfolk, Virginia. She was one of the Atlantic Fleet's warships responding to the President John F. Kennedy's call for a quarantine of Cuba (24 October – 20 November 1962) during the Cuban Missile Crisis. She patrolled off the island to enforce the blockade.

John R. Perry resumed sonar schoolship duties out of Key West which continued through 1965. This principal service was interrupted by overhauls in the Charleston Navy Yard, special anti-submarine warfare tactics in the Caribbean and along the eastern seaboard with Task Force Alpha, and joint operations with units of the Venezuelan Navy (2–8 February 1964). During these years John R. Perry helped train the men of the Navy in the latest ASW techniques.

John R. Perry was transferred to the Pacific Fleet on 1 May 1966. She departed Key West on the 16th, transited the Panama Canal three days later, and arrived Pearl Harbor on 4 June to operate in the Hawaiian area through mid-1967.

=== Transfer to Indonesia ===
She was decommissioned in the early 1970s, struck from the Naval Vessel Register on 20 February 1973 and transferred to Indonesia. There she was renamed Samadikun (D-1)', reclassified as DE-341 in 1982. She was decommissioned in 2003.
