= Almirante Padilla-class frigate =

Series of frigates operated by the Colombian Navy

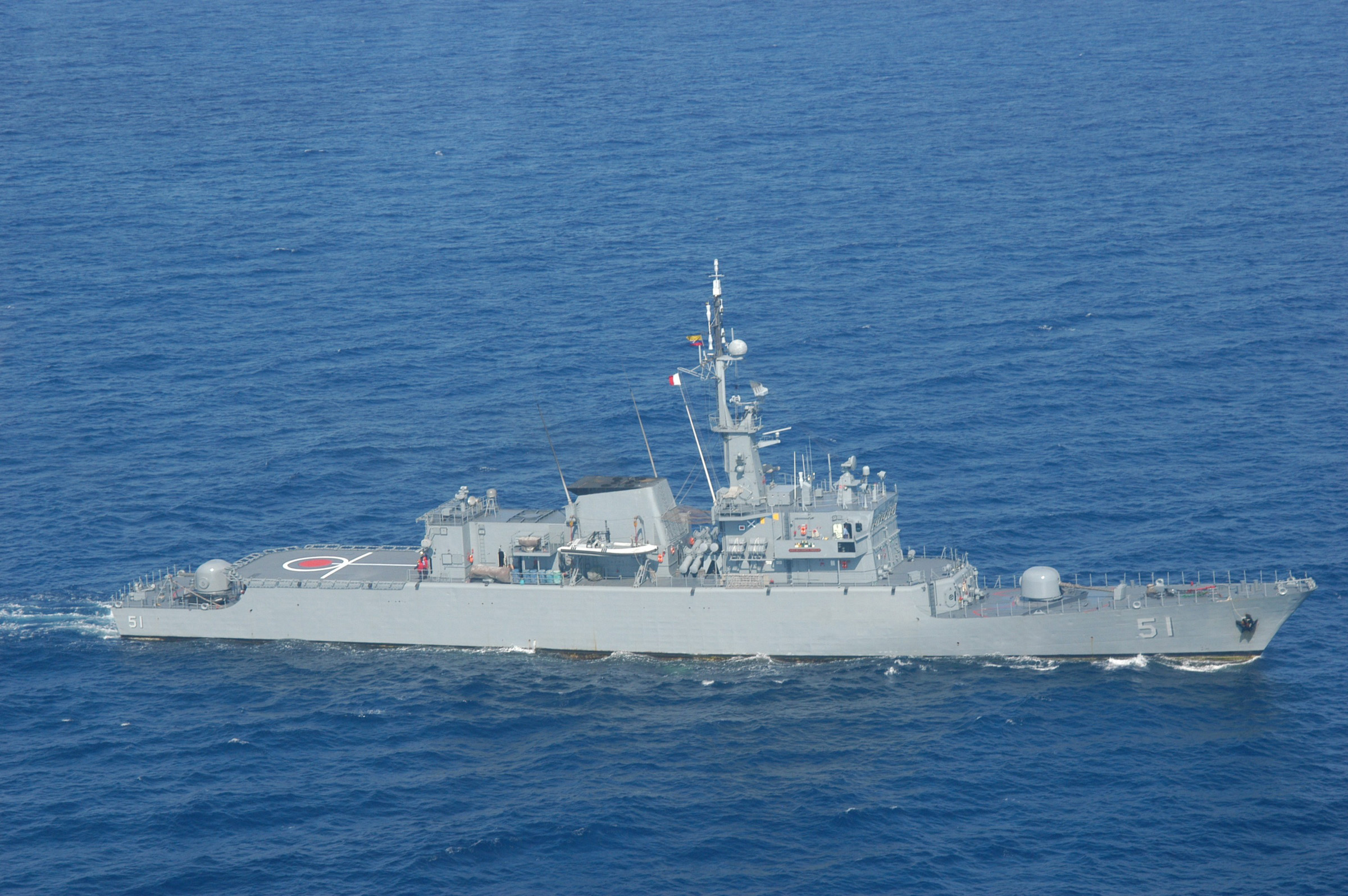
- ARC Almirante Padilla

Class overview
- Name: Almirante Padilla class
- Builders: Howaldtswerke-Deutsche Werft (HDW)
- Operators: Colombian National Navy
- Built: 1981–1983
- In commission: 1983–present
- Planned: 4
- Completed: 4
- Active: 4

General characteristics
- Type: Frigate
- Displacement: 2,100 t (2,100 long tons; 2,300 short tons) full load
- Length: 99.1 m (325 ft 2 in)
- Beam: 11.3 m (37 ft 1 in)
- Draft: 3.7 m (12 ft 2 in)
- Propulsion: 2 shaft, 4 MTU 20V 1163 TB92 diesel engines 23,400 hp (17,400 kW)
- Speed: 27 knots (50 km/h; 31 mph)
- Range: 7,000 nmi (13,000 km; 8,100 mi) at 14 knots (26 km/h; 16 mph)
- Complement: 92
- Sensors & processing systems: SMART-S ( Mk2 version); STING-EO Mk2; Terma Scanter 2001 X-band (after modernisation); Atlas Elektronik ASO 4-2 (Hull mounted)
- Electronic warfare & decoys: VIGILE ESM; 1 × Terma SKWS double mounting
- Armament: 8 SSM-700K Hae Sung I (Sea Star) anti-ship missiles; 2 × Simbad surface-to-air missiles; 1 × OTO Melara 76 mm/62 cal Strales Compact gun; 1 × twin Breda 40 mm/70 guns; 6 × 324 mm torpedo tubes; DART 76 mm Oto Melara guided ammunition
- Aircraft carried: 1 × Messerschmitt-Bölkow-Blohm MBB Bo 105 CBS-5, or; 1 × Eurocopter AS-555-SN Fennec for over-the-horizon targeting

The Almirante Padilla-class frigates is a series of frigates operated by the Colombian Navy. The designation of this class is Type FS 1500 and there are four ships in service. The ships were built by Howaldtswerke-Deutsche Werft (HDW) at Kiel, West Germany in the 1980s, with the first vessel commissioning in 1983 and the last in 1984. The frigates have undergone significant modification over their careers with the 2012 Orion Program Upgrade significantly modernising the vessels. Two similar ships operate as the Kasturi-class corvettes in the Royal Malaysian Navy.

== Design and description ==
Colombia ordered four frigates of the West German Type FS 1500 design in 1980 with the first ship intended to be delivered in 1982. The Colombian Navy intended to upgrade these frigates as funding became available as they became the most powerful ships in their arsenal with the retirement of the older destroyers. Two vessels of a modified design serve with the Royal Malaysian Navy. They initially had a standard displacement of 1,600 tonnes (1,600 long tons) that by 2009 had been reduced to 1,500 tonnes (1,500 long tons) and a fully loaded displacement of 1,850 tonnes (1,820 long tons) that climbed to 2,100 tonnes (2,100 long tons) by 2009. The ships originally measured 95.3 metres (312 ft 8 in) long overall and 90 metres (295 ft 3 in) between perpendiculars with a beam of 11.3 metres (37 ft 1 in) and a draught of 3.5 metres (11 ft 6 in). This was later increased to 99.1 metres (325 ft 2 in) long overall maintaining the same beam but increasing the draught to 3.7 metres (12 ft 2 in). They initially had a complement of 92 which rose to 94 by 2009. The ships are equipped with fin stabilizers.

=== Propulsion ===
The Almirante Padilla class is powered by a CODAD propulsion system. The frigates were powered by four MTU 20V 1163 TB92 diesel engines driving two shafts and developing maximum 17,400 kilowatts (23,400 hp) and 16,000 kW (21,000 hp) sustained turning two controllable pitch propellers. These were the first ships to mount these engines. This gives a maximum speed of 27 knots (50 km/h; 31 mph), and a range of 7,000 nautical miles (13,000 km; 8,100 mi) at 14 knots (26 km/h; 16 mph). (Note: Couhat has the range at 5,000 nautical miles (9,300 km; 5,800 mi) at 14 knots and a maximum 17,000 kW (23,000 hp).) The ships carried 200 t (200 long tons; 220 short tons) of fuel and were capable of generating 2,120 kW of power.

=== Electronics ===
Almirante Padilla-class frigates were initially equipped with one Thomson-CSF Sea Tiger air search radar, one Castor IIB fire control radar. The Sea Tiger radar had a range of 110 kilometres (68 mi) for a target 2 m^{2} (22 sq ft) and the Castor IIB radar, a range of 15 km (9.3 mi) for a 1 m^{2} (11 sq ft) target. a Thomson-CSF Vega II fire-control system (FCS) and two Canopus optronic directors. The vessels had a Krupp Atlas AS04-2 hull-mounted sonar, a Racal Scimitar electronic warfare jammer and two Dagaie chaff launchers. The ships have been improved through the years later receiving Thomson-CSF TAVITAC combat action data systems and Argo AC672 electronic support measures.

=== Armament ===
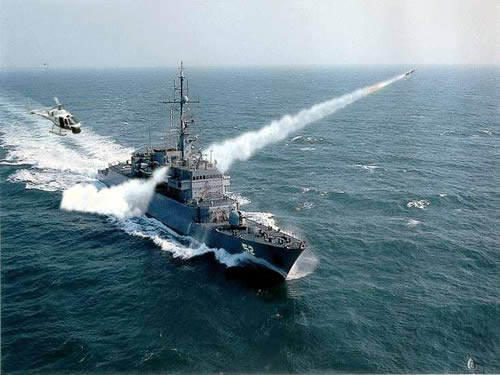
ARC Caldas

The frigates were originally armed with eight MM 40 Exocet anti-ship missiles in two quad mounts located amidships, each carrying a 165 kilograms (364 lb) warhead with a range of 70 km (43 mi). The Almirante Padilla class were also armed with an OTO Melara 76-millimetre (3 in)/62-calibre Compact naval gun, mounted forward firing 6 kg (13 lb) projectiles to a range of 16 km (9.9 mi), 85 rounds per minute. For anti-submarine warfare, the vessels were equipped with six 324 mm (13 in) torpedo tubes in two triple mounts sighted to either side of the aft superstructure using Whitehead A244S torpedoes carrying a 38 kg (84 lb) warhead with a range of 7 km (4.3 mi). (Note: Gardiner, Chumbley & Budzbon have the ships using Mk 32 torpedo tubes.)

For anti-air defence, the frigates were initially armed with twin-mounted Breda 40 mm (1.6 in) guns and four Emerlac 30 mm (1.2 in) guns in two twin mounts. By 2009 the 30 mm guns had been removed. The twin-mounted 40 mm guns are situated aft of the landing platform at the rear of the ship and are capable of firing 300 rounds per minute to a range of 12.5 km (7.8 mi). A space was left in front of the bridge to allow for the later installation of surface-to-air missiles (SAMs). The French Mistral SAM system was chosen composed of two twin Matra Simbad launchers. The Mistral SAM has a warhead of 3 kg (6.6 lb) and a range of 4 km (2.5 mi) for use against sea-skimming missiles.

=== Aircraft ===
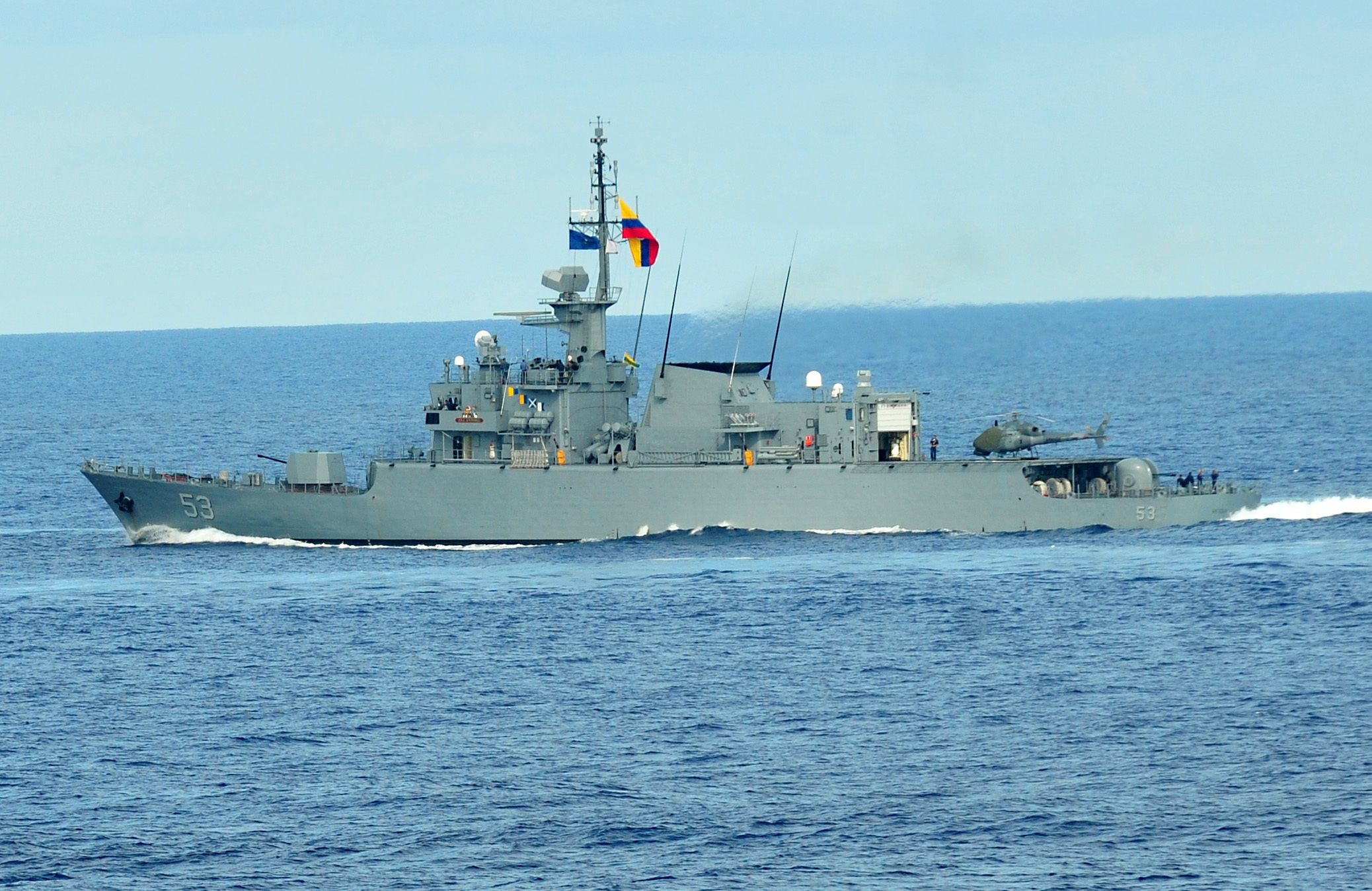
ARC Antioquia during UNITAS Atlantic on 23 September 2012

The Almirante Padilla class does have a hangar facility, and thus can embark a helicopter. The landing platform aft is suitable for a Messerschmitt-Bölkow-Blohm MBB Bo 105 CBS-5 or the Eurocopter AS-555-SN Fennec helicopters for over-the-horizon targeting. The landing pad was extended aft by 2 m (6 ft 7 in) to accommodate Bell 412 helicopters.

=== Orion Program Upgrade ===
The Orion Program Upgrade was a mid-life refit performed by the Thales Group. In January 2012, Thales Group delivered the first upgraded Almirante Padilla-class frigates to the Colombian Navy. The equipment upgrades included a series of new sensors including the Smart-s Mk2 radar, TACTICOS combat system, Sting-EO Mk2 naval fire control tracking system, MIRADOR electro-optical multi-sensor surveillance, tracking and fire control system. For defence, the vessels were upgraded with the Vigile Radar Electronic Support Measures (RESM) system and TERMA SKSW DL-12T decoy system. They were given new MTU M-93 engines and new communication systems. In addition, OTO Melara DART ammunition and 16 SSM-700K Hae Sung I (Sea Star) anti-ship missiles were ordered. In September 2014, Colombia fired the DART guided ammunition from the Oto Melara 76 mm Strales. The testing was performed aboard Caldas.

== Ships in class ==
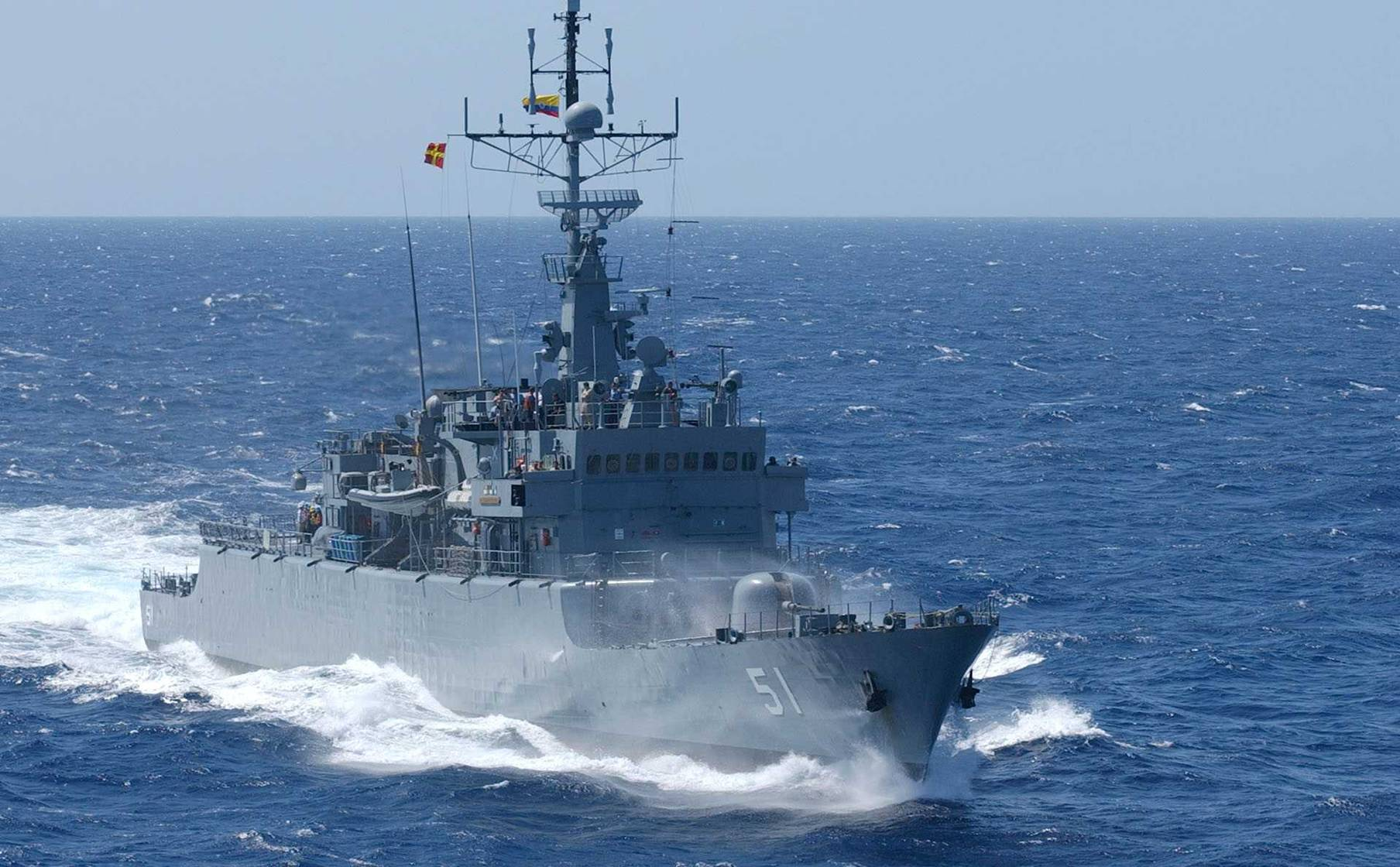
Almirante Padilla at sea

Almirante Padilla-class frigates
Name	Pennant number	Builder	Laid down	Launched	Commissioned	Status
Almirante Padilla	FM-51	Howaldtswerke-Deutsche Werft, Kiel	17 March 1981	6 January 1982	31 October 1983	In active service
Caldas	FM-52	Howaldtswerke-Deutsche Werft, Kiel	14 June 1981	23 April 1982	14 February 1984	In active service
Antioquia	FM-53	Howaldtswerke-Deutsche Werft, Kiel	22 June 1981	28 August 1982	30 April 1984	In active service
Independiente	FM-54	Howaldtswerke-Deutsche Werft, Kiel	22 June 1981	21 January 1983	27 July 1984	In active service

== Service history ==
The Almirante Padilla-class frigates are used primarily to patrol Colombia's exclusive economic zone and perform anti-narcotic patrols in Colombian waters. The frigates have also taken part in naval exercises such as UNITAS and PANAMAX. The frigates can also be used to resupply outlying military posts on Colombian islands.

== See also ==
- List of frigate classes by country

Equivalent frigates of the same era

- Ulsan class
- Lupo class
- Koni class
- Type 21
- Wielingen class
- Type 053
