= Asahi-class destroyer escort =

Class of destroyer escorts in the Japanese military

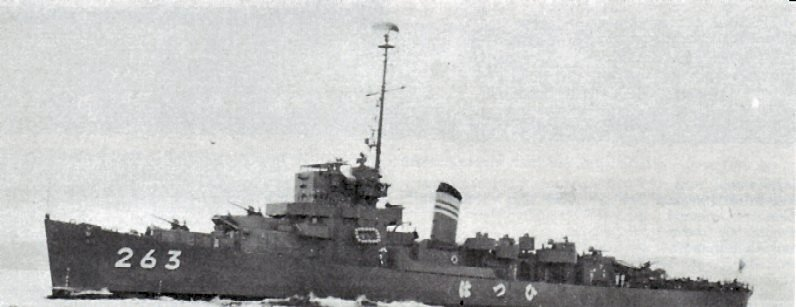
- JDS Hatsuhi in 1967

Class overview
- Name: Asahi-class destroyer escort
- Builders: Federal Shipbuilding and Drydock Company, New Jersey
- Operators: Coastal Safety Force; Japan Maritime Self-Defense Force
- Preceded by: Wakaba class
- Succeeded by: Akebono class
- Subclasses: Cannon class
- Built: 1943
- In commission: 1955–1975
- Completed: 2
- Laid up: 1
- Retired: 2

General characteristics
- Type: Destroyer Escort
- Displacement: 1,240 tons standard; 1,620 tons full load
- Length: 93.3 m (306 ft)
- Beam: 11 m (36 ft)
- Draft: 3.5 m (11 ft) full load
- Propulsion: 4 GM Mod. 16-278A diesel engines with electric drive; 6,000 shp (4,500 kW), 2 screws
- Speed: 21 knots (39 km/h)
- Range: 10,800 nautical miles (20,000 km; 12,400 mi) at 12 knots (22 km/h)
- Complement: 15 officers; 201 enlisted men
- Armament: 3 × 3 in (76 mm)/50 guns (3×1); 2 × 40 mm Bofors AA guns (1x2); 8 × 20 mm Oerlikon AA guns (8×1); 3 × Torpedo tubes for 21-inch Mark 15 torpedo (1×3); 8 × depth charge projectors; 1 × Hedgehog anti-submarine mortar; 2 x depth charge tracks

The Asahi-class destroyer escort was a class of destroyer escorts of Japanese Maritime Self-Defense Force. Two ships were lent from the Cannon class by the United States Navy and in commissioned from 1955 until 1975.

== Description ==
In 1951, General Matthew Ridgway, Supreme Commander of the Allied Forces, proposed to lend a patrol frigate (PF) and a landing support boat (LSSL) to Japan under Allied occupation. In response to this, on April 26, 1952, the Coastal Safety Force was established within the Japan Coast Guard to serve as a receiver for these warships and as the base of the future Navy. Then, with the establishment of the National Safety Agency on August 1, the same year, the Coast Guard absorbed the route enlightenment department of the Japan Coast Guard and was reorganized into a security force, together with the National Police Reserve (later the National Safety Force), which is a land unit, of the National Safety Agency.

Of the rented vessels, all 18 PF vessels were delivered in 1953 and commissioned as comb-type guard vessels, which later became the starting point for the development of the Maritime Self-Defense Force escort vessels. In the budget for 1952, which is the year when the guards were established, the construction of support vessels (water vessels, heavy oil vessels, etc.) to improve the operational base of these guard vessels was prioritized, and the construction of combat ships was not carried out. Although domestic construction of security vessels began in 1953, the construction in the same year was two 1,600-ton instep security vessels (Harukaze class) and 1,000-ton B-type security vessels (JDS Akebono and Ikazuchi class). It was fastened to 3 ships.

On May 14, 1954, the US-Japan Ship Loan Agreement was signed, and two Livermore-class destroyers and two Cannon-class destroyer escorts were to be rented. This type is the one that recommissioned this Cannon class. The Livermore class became the Asakaze-class destroyer.

== Ships in the class ==
Asahi class
| Hull no. | Name | Builder | Laid down | Launched | Commissioned | Decommissioned |
|---|---|---|---|---|---|---|
| DE-262 | Asahi | Federal Shipbuilding and Drydock Company, New Jersey | 7 January 1943 | 27 May 1943 | 14 June 1955 | 13 June 1975 |
| DE-263 | Hatsuhi | Federal Shipbuilding and Drydock Company, New Jersey | 14 January 1943 | 27 May 1943 | 14 June 1955 | 13 June 1975 |

== Gallery ==
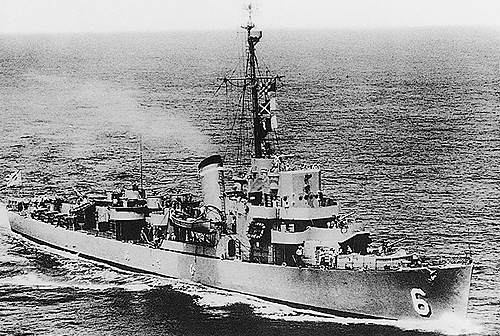
JDS Asahi with her hull number painted 6 which indicates the affiliation of the 6th escort corps.
