= Allende-class frigate =

Class of Mexican Navy frigates

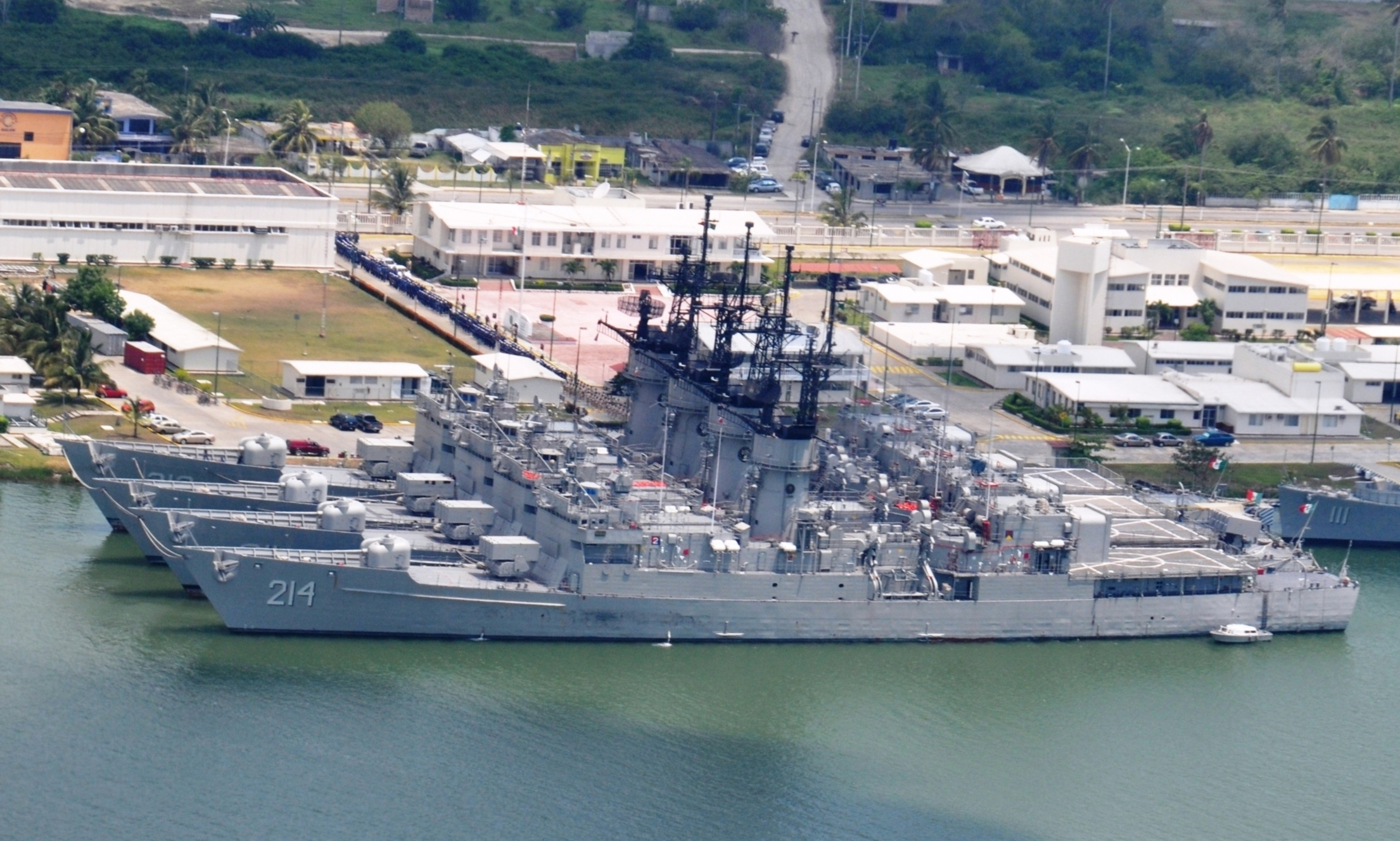
- All four frigates of the class at Tuxpan, 12 June 2009

Class overview
- Name: Allende class
- Builders: Todd Shipyard, Seattle and San Pedro; Lockheed Shipbuilding and Construction Company; Avondale Shipyard
- Operators: Mexican Navy
- In commission: 1998–2016
- Completed: 4
- Laid up: 3
- Retired: 4

General characteristics
- Type: Multi-purpose anti-submarine frigate
- Displacement: 3,011 long tons (3,059 t) standard; 4,260 long tons (4,328 t) full load
- Length: 439 ft 6 in (133.96 m)
- Beam: 46 ft 8 in (14.22 m)
- Draught: 24 ft 8 in (7.52 m) max
- Installed power: 2 × Combustion Engineering/Babcock & Wilcox boilers
- Propulsion: 1 Westinghouse steam turbine 35,000 shp (26,000 kW)
- Speed: 27 knots (50 km/h; 31 mph)
- Range: 4,300 nmi (8,000 km; 4,900 mi) at 22 knots (41 km/h; 25 mph)
- Complement: 288
- Sensors & processing systems: SPS-10 or SPS-67 surface search radar; SPS-40B air search radar; SQS-26 CX hull mounted LF sonar; SPG-53F fire control radar; TACAN SRN-15A; Mk 114 ASW fire control system; Mk 68 gunfire fire control system
- Armament: 1 × 5 in (127 mm)/54 cal. Mk 42 DP gun; 2 × twin fixed MK 32 Mod. 9 324 mm (13 in) torpedo launchers; Mk 25 BPDMS launcher for Sea Sparrow missiles (Allende only)
- Aircraft carried: 1 MBB Bo 105 helicopter
- Aviation facilities: One helicopter hangar and helipad
- Notes: Ex-Knox-class US ocean escort frigates

The Allende class is a series of four anti-submarine frigates used by the Mexican Navy. Allende-class frigates are former United States Navy Knox-class-ships which were acquired beginning in 1997. They form the Mexican Gulf Fleet of the Mexican Navy. They are used for anti-submarine and offshore patrol duties. All four ships were taken out of service by 2016 and one was sunk as an artificial reef in 2022. In 2024, it was announced the other three hulls would be donated for use as artificial reefs.

== Description ==
The Allende-class frigates are former United States Navy Knox-class frigates. They have a standard displacement of 3,011 long tons (3,059 t) and 4,260 long tons (4,328 t) at full load. The vessels measure 439 ft 6 in (133.96 m) long with a beam of 46 ft 8 in (14.22 m) and a maximum draught of 24 ft 8 in (7.52 m). The ships are propelled by a Westinghouse steam turbine rated at 35,000 shaft horsepower (26,000 kW) turning one shaft using steam provided by two Combustion Engineering/Babcock & Wilcox boilers at a working pressure of 1,200 psi (8,300 kPa) and a temperature of 950 °F (510 °C). This gives the frigates a maximum speed of 27 knots (50 km/h; 31 mph) and a range of 4,000 nmi (7,400 km; 4,600 mi) at 22 knots (41 km/h; 25 mph) on one boiler. The ships have a complement of 288 including 20 officers.

The frigates are armed with a reduced version of their American layouts. They mount a single FMC 5-inch (127 mm)/54-caliber Mk 42 dual-purpose gun mounted forward. For anti-submarine warfare (ASW), the frigates are equipped with an ASROC Mk 16 octuple launcher with a reload system sited between the superstructure and the 5-inch gun. Two cells were re-configured to fire Harpoon surface-to-surface missiles in American service, but this ability was not transferred to the Mexican Navy. The Allende class also mounts two twin Mk 32 324 mm (12.8 in) torpedo launchers in fixed tubes for 22 Mk 46 torpedoes. The launchers are sited on the midships structure, angled outward at a 45° angle. Allende retains the Mk 25 launcher for the Sea Sparrow surface-to-air missiles that the vessels mounted in American service.

The class is equipped with fixed Mk 36 SRBOC 6-barreled decoy launchers for infrared and chaff, SLQ-25 Nixie towed torpedo decoys and SLQ-32CV2 electronic support measures. They mount a Mk 68 Mod gunfire control system for the 5-inch guns, a Mk 114 Mod 6 control system for the ASW armament, a Mk 1 target designation and a MMS target acquisition system. For radar, the Allende class have SPS-40 air search and SPS-10 or SPS-67 surface search. The vessels are equipped with SPG-53D/F fire control radar and SRN-15A TACAN. The Allende class have a SQS-26CX bow-mounted sonar capable of active search and attack. The frigates have a helipad located over the stern of the ship and a hangar capable of storing the MBB Bo 105 helicopter that operates off the vessels.

== Ships in class ==
Allende class
Pennant No.	Ship name	Builder	Acquired	Commissioned	Status
F 211 (ex-E 50)	ARM Allende (ex-Stein)	Lockheed Shipbuilding and Construction Company	29 January 1997	23 November 1998	Decommissioned 2016, awaiting disposal
F 212 (ex-E 51)	ARM Abasolo (ex-Marvin Shields)	Todd Shipyards	29 January 1997	23 November 1998	Deliberately sunk off Tuxpan, 27 April 2022.
F 213 (ex-E 52)	ARM Victoria (ex-Pharris)	Avondale Shipyards	2 February 2000	16 March 2000	Decommissioned 2016, awaiting disposal
F 214	ARM Mina (ex-Whipple)	Todd Shipyards	August 2001	1 November 2002	Decommissioned 2016, awaiting disposal

== Service history ==
The first two ships were acquired by the Mexican Navy on 29 January 1997 and underwent refits for Mexican service. Both ships were commissioned on 23 November 1988. The third ship was acquired in 2000 and the fourth in 2001. Mina is based at Manzanillo, the other three at Tampico. Victoria commissioned on 16 March 2000 and Mina on 1 November 2002. By 2016, all four ships had been taken out of service by the Mexican Navy. One, Abasalo, was sunk as an artificial reef 35 nautical miles (65 km; 40 mi) east of Tuxpan, Mexico. The other three vessels were donated by the Mexican government for use as artificial reefs in 2024.
