= Soho-class frigate =

1982 class of North Korea frigate

Class overview
- Name: Soho-class frigate
- Builders: Najin Shipyards
- Operators: Korean People's Navy
- Succeeded by: Nampo-class corvette
- In commission: 1982–2009
- Planned: Unknown
- Building: ?
- Completed: 1
- Retired: 1

General characteristics (as per Janes)
- Type: Twin-hulled frigate
- Displacement: 1640 tons full load
- Length: 73.8 metres (242 ft)
- Beam: 15.5 metres (51 ft)
- Draught: 3.8 metres (12 ft)
- Installed power: Unknown
- Propulsion: diesel
- Speed: 23 kts
- Range: Unknown
- Complement: 190
- Sensors & processing systems: Radar; Surface search – Square Tie; Fire control – Drum Tilt; Sonar; Stag horn sonar; hull-mounted active search/attack
- Electronic warfare & decoys: Chinese RW-23 Jug Pair (Watch Dog) ESM
- Armament: Missiles; four CSS-N-2 SSM; Guns; One 100mm/56; four 37mm/63 (2 twin); four 25mm/60 (2 twin); Anti-submarine mortars; Two RBU 1200 5-tube fixed launchers
- Armour: Light
- Aircraft carried: 1 Mil Mi-4 (seen on board in 2000–2007
- Aviation facilities: landing platform for medium helicopter, no visible hangar
- Notes: Twin-hulled design; continuous maindeck from stem to sternShips in class include: Experimental – only one built, Pennant number 823

The Soho-class frigates was a class of naval warship in North Korea. The warship used a twin-hulled design, which is unusual for North Korea. As there is only one ship in the class, it is likely that the ship was purely experimental.

In 2014 it was reported that the ship was retired and scrapped in 2009. The new light helicopter-carrier frigate of Nampo-class corvette has been designed as its replacement.
