= Al Madinah-class frigate =

Saudi warship class

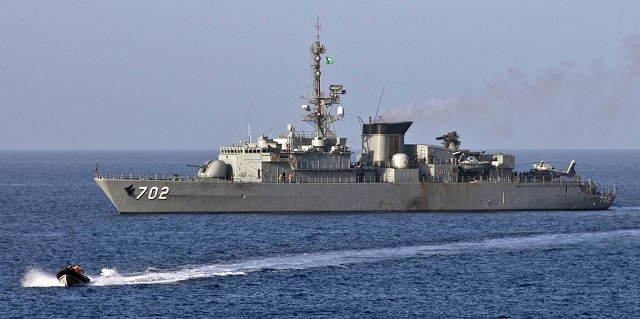
- Al Madinah in 2017

Class overview
- Name: Al Madinah class
- Builders: Arsenal de Lorient, France; CNIM, La Seyne, France
- Operators: Royal Saudi Navy
- Succeeded by: Al Riyadh class
- Built: 1981–1986
- In commission: 1985–present
- Planned: 4
- Completed: 4
- Active: 4

General characteristics
- Type: Frigate
- Displacement: 1,990 tons standard; 2610 tons full load
- Length: 377 ft 4 in (115.01 m)
- Beam: 41 ft (12 m)
- Draught: 15 ft 4 in (4.67 m)
- Installed power: 32,500 bhp (24,200 kW)
- Propulsion: 2 shaft, SEMT Pielstick diesel engines
- Speed: 30 knots (56 km/h; 35 mph)
- Range: 8,000 nmi (15,000 km; 9,200 mi) at 15 kn (28 km/h; 17 mph)
- Complement: 179
- Sensors & processing systems: Radars; 2 x Decca 1226, Thompson CSF – Sea Tiger DRBV-15, DRBC-32E; Castor 2 (fire control); Sonar; Hull-mounted Thompson CSF Diodon, Diodon-Sorel VDS
- Electronic warfare & decoys: Thompson CSF DR4000 ESM, SENIT VI CCS, Decoys: Two CSEE Dagaie chaff launchers
- Armament: 8 × Otomat mk 2 anti ship missiles; 1 × 100 mm/55 compact gun; 2 × twin 40 mm/70 Breda Bofors guns; 1 × 8-cell Crotale surface to air missile launcher (24 missiles); 4 × 550 mm torpedo tubes (F17P torpedoes)
- Aircraft carried: 1 × SA365F Dauphin helicopter
- Aviation facilities: Flight deck and hangar

The Al Madinah class are a series of four frigates built in France for the Royal Saudi Navy. The ships are named after Saudi cities. The first, Al Madinah was commissioned in 1985, and the fourth, Taif was commissioned in 1986. All four Al Madinah-class frigates are based in the Red Sea.

== Description ==
The frigates were ordered in October 1980 as part of the "Sawari" programme. The Al Madinah class was built in France at the Arsenal de Marine, Lorient (French Government Dockyard and CNIM, La Seyne in the mid-1980s. Their full load displacement is 2,610 tons and they are armed with eight Otomat surface-to-surface missiles, one 8-cell Crotale surface-to-air missile launcher, with 26 missiles total. The vessels are also armed with one 100 mm/55 dual purpose gun, two 40 mm anti-aircraft guns, four torpedo tubes. The frigates have an aft helicopter deck and hangar for use by one Dauphin helicopter.

== Ships in class ==
Ship	Builder	Laid down	Launched	Completed
702 Al Madinah	Arsenal de Lorient	15 October 1981	23 April 1983	4 January 1985
704 Hofouf	CNIM, La Seyne	14 June 1982	24 June 1983	31 October 1985
706 Abha	CNIM, La Seyne	17 December 1982	23 December 1983	4 April 1986
708 Taif	CNIM, La Seyne	1 March 1983	25 May 1984	29 August 1986

== Service history ==
In August 2013, the Kingdom of Saudi Arabia and the French ODAS agency signed a contract to upgrade and modernize the Al Madinah-class frigates.

On 30 January 2017, Al Madinah was attacked by Yemeni Houthi militia along the western coast of Yemen in the Red Sea. Two Saudi sailors were killed and three injured in the attack. Houthi forces claimed to have targeted the ship with a missile, but Saudi forces claim that the ship was hit by 3 "suicide boats".
