= Najin-class frigate =

1973 class of North Korean Navy frigates

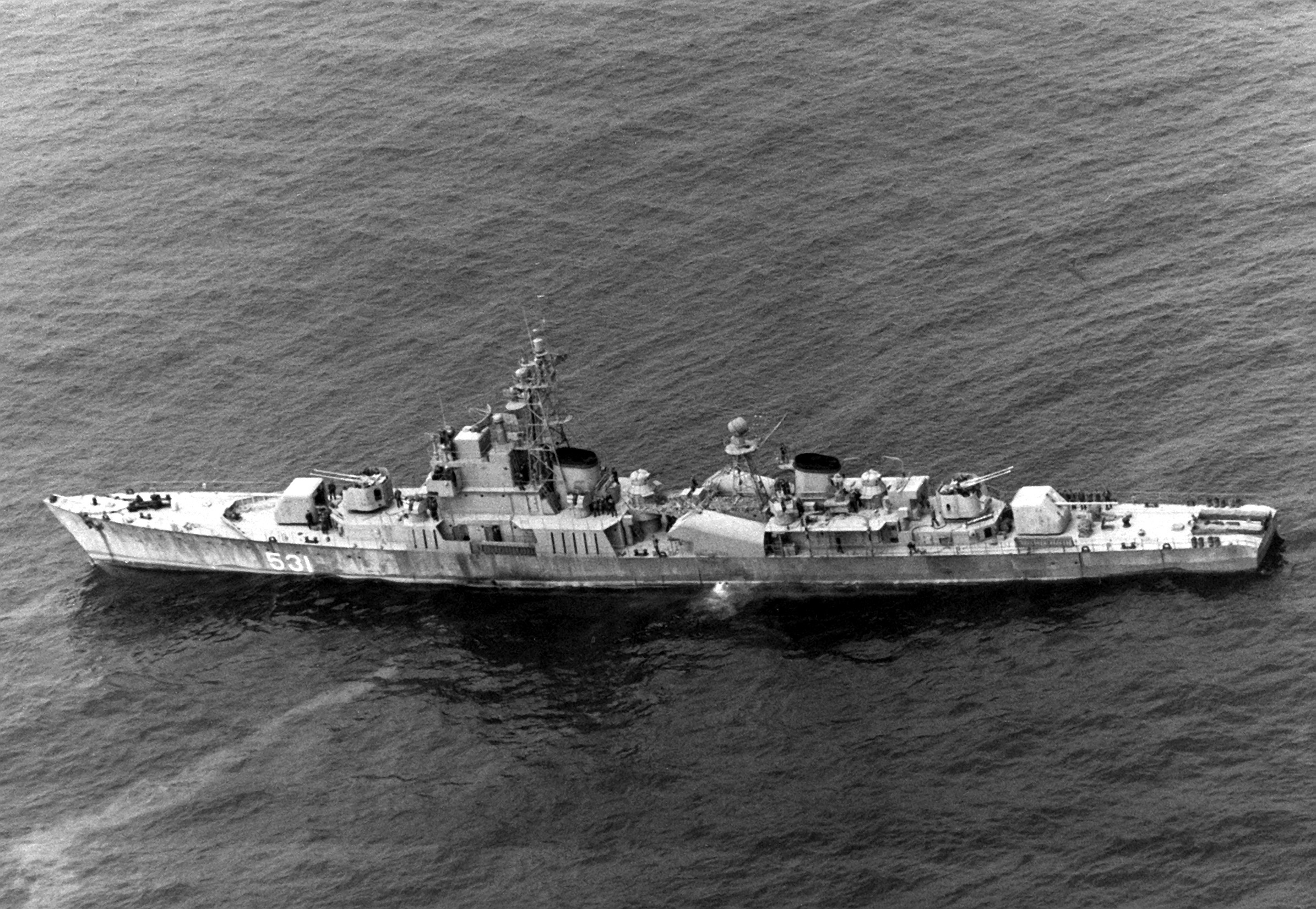
- 1993 aerial port side view of a North Korean Navy Najin-class frigate underway; a hull number (531) is visible toward the bow.

Class overview
- Builders: Unknown, but built in North Korea (Najin Shipyards)
- Operators: KPA Naval Force
- Built: 1971–1979
- In commission: 1973–present
- Completed: 4+
- Active: 2+
- Retired: 2+

General characteristics
- Type: Frigate
- Displacement: 1,600 long tons (1,600 t)
- Length: 328 ft (100 m)
- Beam: 32.8 ft (10.0 m)
- Draught: 8.9 ft (2.7 m)
- Propulsion: 2x diesels; 15,000 bhp (11,000 kW); 2 shafts
- Speed: 26 knots (48 km/h; 30 mph)
- Range: 4,000 nmi (7,400 km; 4,600 mi) at 14 knots (26 km/h; 16 mph)
- Complement: 180
- Sensors & processing systems: Radar; Air search: Square Tie; Surface search: Pot Head; Navigation: Pot Drum; Fire control: Drum Tilt; Sonar; Stag horn; hull-mounted active search/attack sonar
- Armament: Missiles: SSM - two SS-N-2 Styx or SS-N-25 Switchblade; Guns; 2 × 100 mm (4 in)/56 (single); 4 x 57 mm (2.2 in) (twin); twelve or four 30 mm (1 in)/66 (6 or 2 twin); 12 × 25 mm (0.98 in) machine guns (6 twin); Other: Two RBU 1200 five-tube fixed launchers; Depth charges (two projectors, two racks); 30 mines

The North Korean Najin-class frigates are some of the largest vessels in the Korean People's Navy.

Although they bear a striking resemblance to Soviet Kola-class frigates, they are unrelated to any Russian or Chinese design. They were built in the 1970s.

== History ==
The class was originally fitted with a trainable triple 21-inch (533 mm) torpedo launcher, which was replaced in the mid-1980s with fixed P-15 Termit missile launchers taken from Osa-class missile boats. The design is inherently dangerous, and even a minor missile failure would result in significant damage to the ship.

In 2023, two or more of these frigates remain active with North Korea's navy a full half-century after they were commissioned. An estimated two or more have been retired, though what has been done with them since then is unknown.

== Upgrades ==
At least one Najin-class ship appears to have been upgraded with much more modern weaponry in 2014. Refitted at Namp'o, the outdated anti-ship missiles, aft 57-millimetre (2.2 in) dual cannon, Drum Tilt fire-control radar and surface search radar were removed, and several new systems were installed. Most clearly identifiable are two 30 mm (1.2 in) automated turrets at the aft, likely based on the Soviet AK-630 CIWS, and two Kh-35 missile racks with the capacity for about eight missiles in place of the older P-15 Termit/HY-2 launchers. The modernization program appears to be continuing as of December 2014.
