= Kotor-class frigate =

Class of frigates built for Yugoslav navy

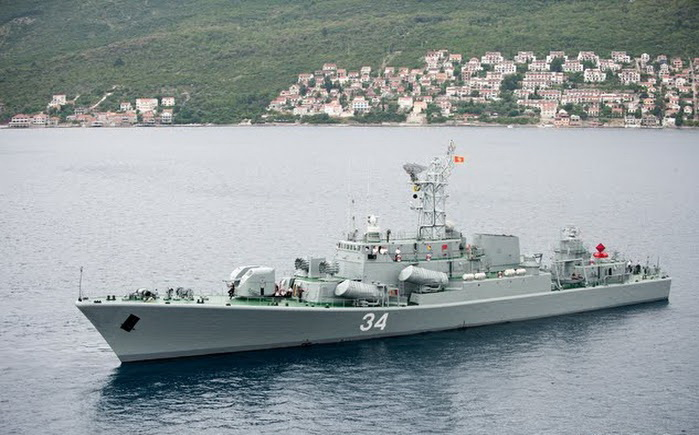
- Pula (P-34)

Class overview
- Name: Kotor class (Project 1159)
- Operators: Yugoslav Navy; Federal Yugoslav Navy; Montenegrin Navy
- Preceded by: Koni class
- Built: 1985–1989
- Completed: 2
- Active: 0

General characteristics
- Type: Frigate
- Displacement: 1,250 tons (standard); 1,492 tons (full load)
- Length: 91.8 m (301 ft 2 in)
- Beam: 12.8 m 11.66
- Draught: 4.2 m
- Propulsion: 2 shaft CODAG, 1 gas turbine - 11,4720 kW; 2 diesels - 3,648 kW
- Speed: 27 knots
- Range: 1800 nm at 14 knots
- Sensors & processing systems: MR-302 Rubka, Decca RM 1226, MPZ-301, 9LV-200 MK-2, MR-104 Ris
- Armament: 1 × SA-N-4 SAM launcher; 4 × SS-N-2 anti-ship missiles; 1 × 76.2 mm (3.00 in) double-barreled naval gun AK-726; 2 × AK-230 CIWS; 2 × RBU-6000 ASW rocket launchers; 2 × MTU-IV Strela 2M launchers; 20 × naval mines

The Kotor class (Yugoslav designation: Veliki Patrolni Brod (VPBR)) are a pair of light frigates built for the Yugoslav Navy during the 1980s at the Kraljevica Shipyard in SR Croatia.

== History ==
The development of the Kotor class began in the late 1970s with the Yugoslav Navy requesting a class of ship that could conduct operations beyond Yugoslavia's coastal regions and replace its aging destroyers. Designs of the new ship were completed at the Zagreb Naval Institute in 1982. Based on the Soviet Koni-class anti-submarine warfare frigate hull, the Yugoslav Kotor class was designed and built with a modified superstructure and forward positioning of its SS-N-2 anti-ship missiles.

== Service history ==
Construction of P-33 was completed on 29 December 1986 for the Yugoslav Navy at Kraljevica Shipyard and sailed to her first port of Lora naval base in Split. Commissioned as Veliki Patrolni Brod (large patrol boat) VPBR-33 Kotor, she was registered in the Yugoslav Navy fleet list on the same day. Commissioned as VPBR-34 Pula, P-34 was completed on 28 February 1988 and joined the Yugoslav Navy fleet list on the same day.

With the dissolution of Yugoslavia, on 31 May 1992 both P-33 an P-34 were relocated to the Navy Technical and Repair Institute "Sava Kovacevic" in Tivat, Montenegro and then later moved to the Port of Bar, where they were commissioned with the FR Yugoslav Navy of Serbia and Montenegro. In 2006, the ships were passed on to the Montenegrin Navy following the dissolution of Serbia and Montenegro and in 2018 the Montenegrin government announced its intent to sell the two ships, with Israel being identified as a potential customer. As of September 2019 both ships are operational in an offshore patrol vessel role with the Montenegrin Navy at naval base Bar.

In 2005, P-34 participated in joint Serbia and Montenegro/Italy naval exercise "Common Horizon" in the Port of Brindisi in Italy and then in 2007 at an ADRION countries (Adriatic Ionian Initiative) „ADRION 11 LIVEX“ in the vicinity of the Corfu Island region under the flag of Montenegro.

In 2009, P-34 participated in two joint offshore exercises hosted by Montenegro, inviting ships from the United States and France, and in 2010 with vessels from Germany and the Turkey.

Both ships were withdrawn from service in 2019 and were put up for sale.

== Design ==
The hull used sheet steel with a thickness of 3 to 15 mm, while the superstructure is made of aluminum alloy with a thickness of 2 to 10 mm. The superstructure was designed to reduce radar reflection.

The frigates are armed with four missiles, ship-to-ship P-21 or P-22 (NATO code SS-N-2 Styx). The weight of the missiles is 2607 kg, warhead weighing 480 kg, with a range from 8 to 80 km altitude flying at 25 or 50 meters, at a speed of Mach 0.9. They have infra-red self-guidance systems (P-22) or active radar guidance (P-21).

For air defense, the ships use OSA-M missile systems (NATO code SA-N-4 Gecko). It consists of the radio-controlled guided anti-aircraft missile RZ-13 mounted on the double ejector type missile rail ZIF-122, device management and shooting training operator. The RZ-13 missile can effectively destroy targets that fly at a height of 50-6,000 m at a distance to 15 km.

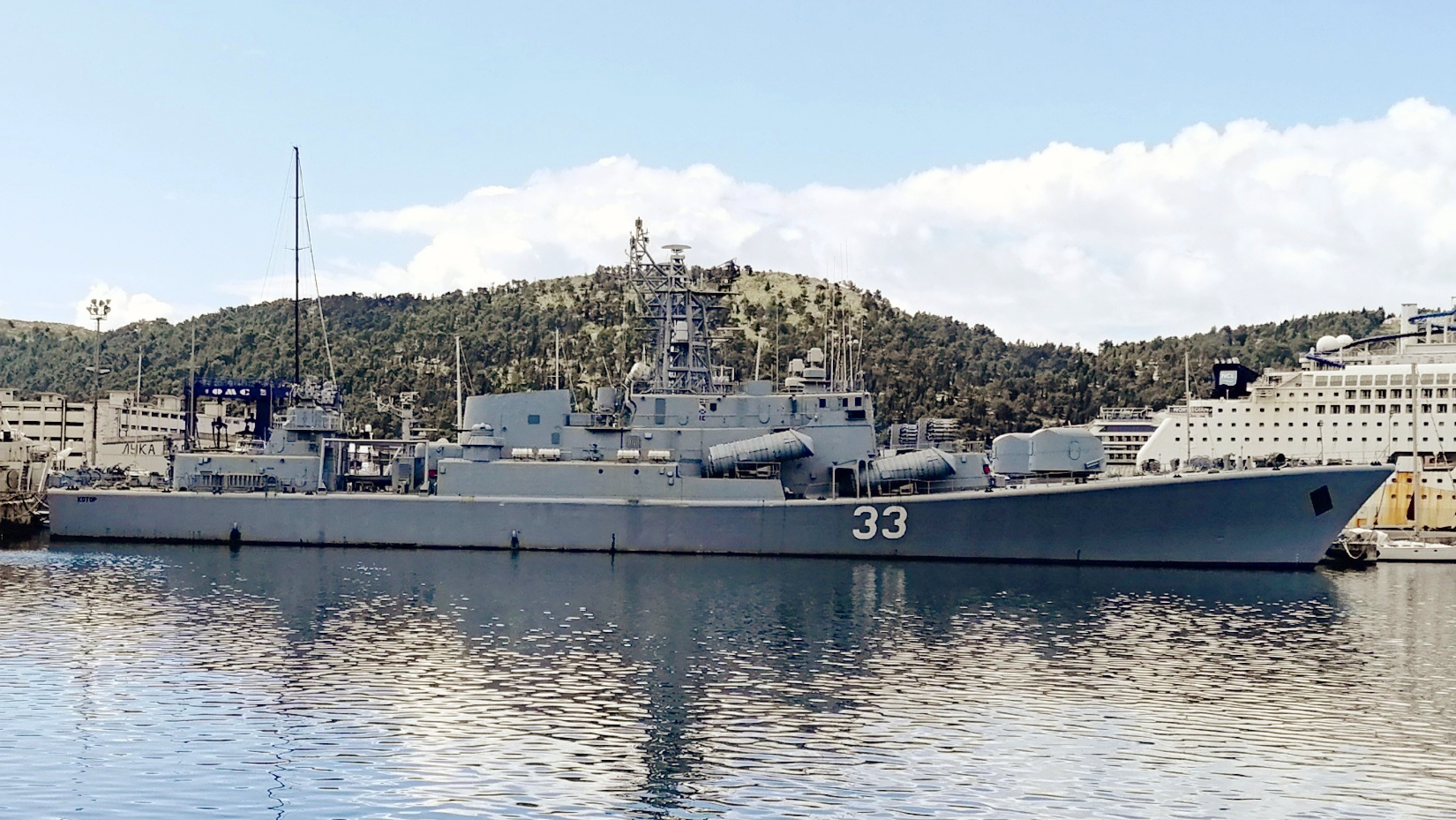
Kotor-class frigate P-33, May 2021

The ship has two quadruple launchers MTU-IV with four anti-air 9K32 Strela-2 M missiles. Launchers are compatible with other, more modern MANPADS.

Two rocket twelve-barreled depth charge launchers RBU-6000 are intended for anti-submarine warfare. Their range is 350 to 5,500 m, with a maximum target depth of 400 m.

The frigates are also armed with artillery, consisting of twin universal automatic AK-726 cannon and two 30mm AK-230 cannons.

The Kotor frigates are equipped with sensors to detect and track targets. To detect surface and air targets, the MR-302 Rubka (NATO codename Strut Curve) radar is used, which has an approximately 110 km range, while the RM 1226 Decca radar is intended for navigation. The MPZ-301 (NATO code Pop Group) radar system is used to fire Osa-M missiles, and for the management of artillery fire observation and sighting radar systems operation 9LV-200 MK-2 and sighting radar MR-104 Ris are used. The ships also have active sonar, radiological detectors, laser detectors and detector for radar irradiate. For the defense of anti-ship missiles frigate is equipped with infrared laser and Barricade type radar decoys.

The Kotors are powered by CODAG (combined), consisting of one M8G gas turbine, providing a maximum power of 14,720 kilowatts (19,740 hp) and two Pielstick SEMT 12 PA 6V diesel engines, providing power of 280 kW by 3648. The ships have three propellers - two for the diesel engines and one for the gas turbine. The main drive represents diesel engines and are used most of the time, while the gas turbine was designed to provide additional speed during the performance of combat tasks.

The other ship systems include a device for degaussing of the ship, two desalinization devices for the production of drinking water, devices for radio link, the device to receive data from hydro-acoustic buoys, devices for underwater connection, firefighting and drainage pumps, fuel pumps for the draft and oil, system air conditioning, fire system on the basis of halogen, equipment for the production of electricity and others.

== Operators ==
=== Former operators ===
- Yugoslavia (SFRY and FRY) - 2 ships, Kotor (RF-33) and Pula (RF-34) (Novi Sad since 1992)
- Montenegro - 2 ships, ex-Kotor (P-33) ex-Pula (P-34) – withdrawn for time being.

== Ships in class ==
Operator	Name	Builder	Launched	Commissioned	Status
Montenegrin Navy	P-33 (ex Kotor)	Kraljevica Shipyard	21 May 1985	29 December 1986	Withdrawn from service 2019.
Montenegrin Navy	P-34 (ex Pula)	Kraljevica Shipyard	18 December 1985	25 March 1988	Withdrawn from service 2019.
