= Thetis-class frigate =

At least two classes of frigates have been named Thetis after their lead ship:

- Thetis-class frigate, a pair of steam frigates built for British Royal Navy in the 1840s and then sold to the Prussian Navy
- Thetis-class patrol vessel, three patrol vessels of the Royal Danish Navy built in the late 1980s and early 1990s
