= Claud Jones-class destroyer escort =

Class of American destroyer escorts

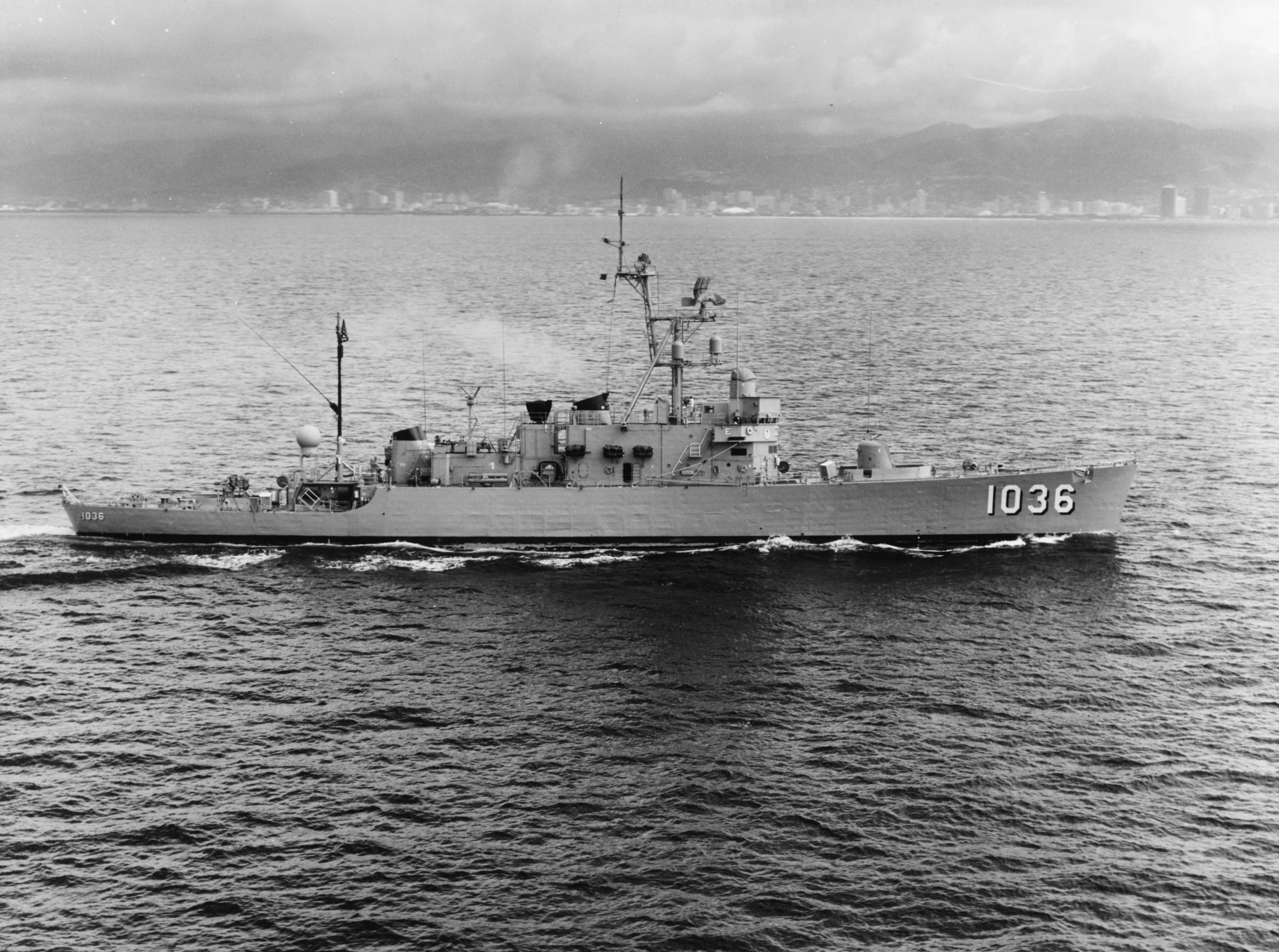
- USS McMorris underway off Oahu on 10 March 1972

Class overview
- Builders: Avondale Shipyard
- Operators: United States Navy; Indonesian Navy; Turkish Naval Forces
- Preceded by: Dealey-class destroyer escort
- Succeeded by: Bronstein-class frigate
- Built: 1956–1959
- In service: 1954-2009
- Completed: 4

General characteristics
- Type: Destroyer escort
- Displacement: 1,314 long tons (1,335 t) standard; 1,970 long tons (2,000 t) full load
- Length: 312 ft 0 in (95.1 m) oa
- Beam: 38 ft 0 in (11.6 m)
- Draft: 12 ft 1 in (3.7 m)
- Propulsion: 4 × Fairbanks-Morse 38ND8 diesel engines; 9,200 shp (6,860 kW); 1 shaft
- Speed: 22 knots (41 km/h)
- Range: 7,000 nmi (13,000 km) at 12 kn (22 km/h)
- Complement: 175
- Armament: 2 × single 3-inch/50-caliber guns; 2 × triple 12.75 in (324 mm) Mk.32 torpedo tubes; 2 × Hedgehog anti-submarine mortars

The Claud Jones-class destroyer escorts were four destroyer escorts built for the United States Navy in the late 1950s. These ships were a diesel-powered version of the earlier Dealey class and were designed with the aim of producing a cheaper ship suitable for rapid production in wartime. These ships also had reduced armament and speed compared to their predecessors. They were not seen as effective anti-submarine warfare vessels by the United States Navy and were sold after only 15 years service to the Indonesian Navy.

== Description ==
The class was designed under project SCB 131 as a cost-effective version of an anti-submarine warfare (ASW) ship that could be built quickly in case of rapid mobilization. The Claud Jones class had a standard displacement of 1,314 long tons (1,335 t) and were 1,916 long tons (1,947 t) at full load. The destroyer escorts were 301 feet 0 inches (91.7 m) long at the waterline and 312 feet 0 inches (95.1 m) overall with a beam of 38 feet 0 inches (11.6 m) and a draft of 12 feet 11 inches (3.9 m). The Claud Jones class had an aluminum superstructure, a tripod mast forward and a pole mast further back amidships, with two stacks. (Note: The Claud Jones-ships' displacement is stated by Moore as 1,450 long tons (1,470 t) standard and 1,750 long tons (1,780 t) at full load.)

Following the guidelines given to them, the designers chose a single-shaft diesel-powered ship to maximize cost effectiveness. The Claud Jones class were given four Fairbanks Morse 38ND8 diesel engines rated at 9,200 brake horsepower (6,860 kW). The class had a range of 7,000 nautical miles (12,964 km; 8,055 mi) at 12 knots (22 km/h; 14 mph) and a maximum speed of 22 knots (41 km/h; 25 mph). (Note: Moore states that the vessels had only one shaft, while Gardiner, Chumbley & Budzbon state the ships' engines were rated at 8,700 brake horsepower (6,500 kW).)

The ships were initially armed with two 3-inch (76 mm)/50 caliber guns, one located forward with a closed shield and one located aft with an open shield. (Note: The 50 caliber denotes the length of the gun. This means that the length of the gun barrel is 50 times the bore diameter.) For ASW, the destroyer escorts were equipped with two forward-firing hedgehog anti-submarine mortars, two fixed 12.75-inch (324 mm) Mark 32 Surface Vessel Torpedo Tubes and one depth charge rack placed over the stern. The fixed torpedo tubes were later removed and replaced with two triple tube mounts. In 1961, Charles Berry and McMorris received a Norwegian-designed Terne III ASW rocket-propelled depth-charge system.

The Claud Jones class was initially equipped with variable depth sonar, AN/SPS-10 and AN/SPS-6 search radars and SQS-29/32 hull-mounted sonar. The variable depth sonar was later removed. The vessels had a ship's company of 175 with 15 officers and 160 enlisted personnel. The class was not well-received and the designers were ordered to come back with another design, leading to the successor Bronstein-class frigates.

=== Indonesian service ===
The four vessels of the class were transferred to the Indonesian Navy in 1973–1974. In Indonesian service, Samadikun (ex-John R. Perry) and Martadinata (ex-Charles Berry) had one of the 3-inch guns removed and given Soviet twin-mounted 37 mm (1.46 in) guns and twin-mounted 25 mm (0.98 in) guns. Monginsidi (ex-Claud Jones) and Ngurah Rai (ex-McMorris) kept their two 3-inch mounts and had twin-mounted 25 mm guns added.

== Turkish production ==
The Berk-class frigates were Turkish-built warships based on the design of the Claud Jones-class destroyer escort. Constructed at the Gölcük Naval Shipyard and commissioned in the early 1970s, they were the first major warships produced by the Turkish Republic. While they retained the propulsion characteristics of the Claud Jones-class, utilizing four diesel engines on a single shaft, the Berk-class featured a modified superstructure and distinct armament configurations, including 3-inch/50 caliber guns and Mark 32 torpedo tubes. These vessels served as a critical bridge between foreign-acquired platforms and the development of Türkiye’s domestic shipbuilding industry, remaining in service until their decommissioning in the 1990s.

Name	Builder	Launched	Commissioned	Fate
TCG Berk (D-358)	(Turkey) Gölcük Naval Shipyard	25 June 1971	12 July 1972	Decommissioned 1995
TCG Peyk (D-359)	(Turkey) Gölcük Naval Shipyard	7 June 1972	24 July 1975	Unknown

== Ships in class ==
Claud Jones class
US name	Hull no.	Builder	Laid down	Launched	US service		Indonesian name	Hull no.	Indonesian service	
US name	Hull no.	Builder	Laid down	Launched	Commissioned	Fate	Indonesian name	Hull no.	Commissioned	Status
USS Claud Jones	DE-1033	Avondale Shipyard, Louisiana	1 June 1957	27 May 1958	16 November 1958	Sold 16 December 1974	KRI Monginsidi	343	1974	Retired
USS John R. Perry	DE-1034	Avondale Shipyard, Louisiana	1 October 1957	29 July 1958	12 January 1959	Sold 20 February 1973	KRI Samadikun	341	1973	Retired
USS Charles Berry	DE-1035	Avondale Shipyard, Louisiana	3 September 1957	17 March 1959	25 November 1960	Sold 31 January 1974	KRI Martadinata	342	1974	Retired
USS McMorris	DE-1036	Avondale Shipyard, Louisiana	1 October 1957	26 May 1959	4 March 1960	Sold 16 December 1974	KRI Ngurah Rai	344	1974	Retired
