= JDS Wakaba =

WWII-era Japanese escort destroyer

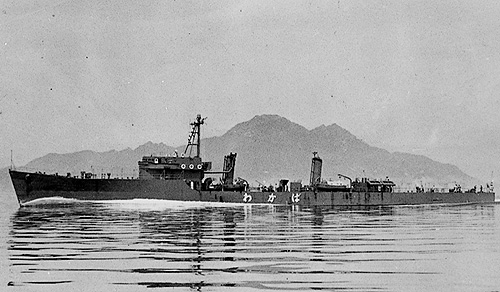
- Wakaba trial run in 1956

History

Japan
- Name: Nashi; (梨)
- Builder: Kawasaki, Kobe
- Laid down: 1 September 1944
- Launched: 17 January 1945
- Commissioned: 15 March 1945
- Fate: Sunk, 28 July 1945; Salvaged, 1955
- Renamed: Wakaba; (わかば)
- Recommissioned: 31 May 1956
- Refit: 1958 (weapons & radar); 1960 (sonar)
- Stricken: 31 March 1971
- Fate: Scrapped, 1972–1973

Class overview
- Preceded by: N/A
- Succeeded by: Asahi class

General characteristics (as built)
- Class & type: Tachibana sub-class of the Matsu-class escort destroyer
- Displacement: 1,309 t (1,288 long tons)
- Length: 100 m (328 ft 1 in)
- Beam: 9.35 m (30 ft 8 in)
- Draft: 3.31 m (10 ft 10 in)
- Installed power: 2 × water-tube boilers; 19,000 PS (14,000 kW)
- Propulsion: 2 × shafts; 2 ×geared steam turbines
- Speed: 26 knots (48 km/h; 30 mph)
- Range: 4,680 nmi (8,670 km; 5,390 mi) at 16 knots (30 km/h; 18 mph)
- Complement: 175
- Sensors & processing systems: 1 × Type 22 search radar; 1 × Type 13 early-warning radar; (added 1958) : Mk34 Fire Control; Mark 63 fire-control system; AN/SPS-5B C Band SS; AN/SPS-12 L Band AS; AN/SPS-8B S Band Heightfinder (added 1960); Sonar (added 1960) : AN/SQR-4/SQA-4; AN/SQS-11A
- Armament: 1 × twin, 1 × single 127 mm (5 in) DP guns; 4 × triple, 13 × single 25 mm (1 in) AA guns; 1 × quadruple 610 mm (24 in) torpedo tubes; 2 × rails, 2 × throwers for 60 depth charges; (All added in 1958); Mk.63 GFCS; 2 × Type 68/Mk.33 3"/50 caliber guns; 1 × Type 54/Mk.10 Hedgehog anti-submarine mortar; 4 × Type 54/Mk.6 K-Guns; 2 × Type 54 Depth charge rack

JDS Wakaba (DE-261) was the former Imperial Japanese Navy ship Nashi, an escort destroyer of the Tachibana sub-class of the Matsu class built for the Imperial Japanese Navy during the final stages of World War II. Nashi was sunk in July 1945, but salvaged in 1954 and refitted to join the Japan Maritime Self-Defense Force in 1956 as Wakaba, later being utilised as a radar trials ship, but stricken in 1971 and scrapped in 1972–1973.

== Design and description ==
The Tachibana sub-class was a simplified version of the preceding Matsu class to make them even more suited for mass production. The ships measured 100 meters (328 ft 1 in) overall, with a beam of 9.35 meters (30 ft 8 in) and a draft of 3.37 meters (11 ft 1 in). They displaced 1,309 metric tons (1,288 long tons) at standard load and 1,554 metric tons (1,529 long tons) at deep load. The ships had two Kampon geared steam turbines, each driving one propeller shaft, using steam provided by two Kampon water-tube boilers. The turbines were rated at a total of 19,000 shaft horsepower (14,000 kW) for a speed of 27.8 knots (51.5 km/h; 32.0 mph). They had a range of 4,680 nautical miles (8,670 km; 5,390 mi) at 16 knots (30 km/h; 18 mph).

The main armament of the Tachibana sub-class consisted of three Type 89 127-millimeter (5 in) dual-purpose guns in one twin-gun mount aft and one single mount forward of the superstructure. The single mount was partially protected against spray by a gun shield. They carried a total of 25 Type 96 25-millimeter (1 in) anti-aircraft guns in 4 triple and 13 single mounts. The accuracy of the Type 89 guns was severely reduced against aircraft because no high-angle gunnery director was fitted. The Tachibanas were equipped with Type 13 early-warning and Type 22 surface-search radars. The ships were also armed with a single rotating quadruple mount amidships for 610-millimeter (24 in) torpedoes. They could deliver their 60 depth charges via two stern racks and two throwers. Photos of her taken in drydock after her salvage showed that she had been equipped with a ramp at her stern designed to launch midget submarines.

== Construction and career ==
Nashi was launched by Kawasaki, Kobe, on 17 January 1945 and completed on 15 March. She was assigned to Desron 11, Combined Fleet, for training on 15 March 1945. In May 1945 she was assigned to Destroyer Division 52, Cruiser-Destroyer Squadron 31. Nashi escaped an attack on Kure Harbour by B-29s on 22 June 1945, but on 28 July 1945 was sunk at Mitajirizaki, Kure (34°14′N 132°30′E) by aircraft from Halsey's Task Force 38. Commander Takeda and most of the crew survived. On 15 September 1945, Nashi was officially struck from the Navy list.

The ship was refloated in 1954, and after repair at Kure recommissioned in the JMSDF as Wakaba on 31 May 1956. She was refitted in 1958 for use as a radar trials ship, and sonar was added in 1960. As such, she was the only ship of the Imperial Japanese Navy to become part of the post-war Japan Maritime Self-Defense Force, and for some time was the biggest ship in the JMSDF.

Wakaba was struck on 31 March 1971, and scrapped in 1972–1973.

== Name ==
'Nashi' is a type of pear. 'Wakaba' means "Young Leaves" in Japanese, suggesting the "green shoots" of recovery, a symbol of a new start after the war. Additionally, while the name 'Nashi' in the logographic Japanese Kanji script unmistakably means: 'pear' (梨), in the phonetic Japanese script of Hiragana, 'Nashi (なし)' can mean "Not exist". Therefore, to avoid misunderstanding the term: "Not exist" (over radio or other communication) she was renamed.
