= Libyan frigate Dat Assawari =

History

Libya
- Name: Dat Assawari
- Builder: Vosper Thornycroft
- Laid down: 27 September 1968
- Launched: 13 October 1969
- Commissioned: 1 February 1973
- Stricken: 1990s

General characteristics
- Class & type: Vosper Mk 7 frigate
- Displacement: 1,325 tons standard; 1,625 tons full load
- Length: 100.6 m (330 ft 1 in)
- Beam: 11.0 m (36 ft 1 in)
- Draught: 3.4 m (11 ft 2 in)
- Propulsion: 2 shaft CODOG; 2 Rolls-Royce Olympus gas turbines 34,600 kW (46,400 hp); 2 Paxman Ventura diesels 2,600 kW (3,500 hp)
- Speed: 37.5 knots (69.5 km/h; 43.2 mph) max
- Range: 5,700 nmi (10,600 km; 6,600 mi) at 17 knots (31 km/h; 20 mph)
- Complement: 132
- Sensors & processing systems: As built: Plessey AWS-1 air-search radar; Decca 629 navigation radar; 2 × Contraves Sea Hunter fire-control radars; Types 162, 170 and 174 sonar; Post refit: Decca TM1229 navigation radar; Selenia RAN-10S air-search radar; Selenia RAN-12L/X air/surface-search radar; Thomson-CSF Diodon sonar; 2 × Italian fire-control radars; Italian combat data information system
- Electronic warfare & decoys: Decca RDL-1
- Armament: Guns: 1 × 4.5 in (114 mm) Mk 8; 1 × twin 35 mm (1.4 in) Oerlikon; 2 × single 40 mm (1.6 in) Bofors; As built: 1 × triple Seacat SAM launcher; 1 × triple Limbo ASW Mortar; Post refit: 1 × quad Aspide SAM launcher; 4 × single Otomat AShM launchers; 2 × triple 324 mm (12.75 in) ASW torpedo tubes

Dat Assawari was a frigate operated by the Libyan Navy. The ship was built by VT Group in the United Kingdom. It was ordered in February 1968 and delivered in 1973. The ship's design, the Vosper Mk 7 is a modified version of the Alvand-class frigate built for the Iranian Navy. The ship had an extensive refit in Italy by CNR Riva Trigoso 1979–1980 when new sensors and missiles were installed. During the refit, the ship was mined by French commandos from SDECE. The vessel returned to service in 1983, but returned to Italy for repairs in 1984–1985 and 1989–1990. The frigate was reportedly scrapped in the late 1990s.

== Design and description ==
Dat Assawari was a modified version of the Vosper Thornycroft Mark 7 design, based on the Alvand-class frigates constructed for the Iranian Navy. It was larger and had different armament than the Iranian ships. As built, Dat Assawari had a standard displacement of 1,346 tonnes (1,325 long tons) and 1,651 tonnes (1,625 long tons) at full load. The frigate measured 94.5 metres (310 ft 0 in) long between perpendiculars and 100.6 metres (330 ft 1 in) overall with a beam of 11 metres (36 ft 1 in) and a draught of 3.4 metres (11 ft 2 in). The vessel was powered by a combined diesel or gas system composed of two Rolls-Royce Marine Olympus gas turbines turning two shafts rated at 34,600 kilowatts (46,400 shp), giving the frigate a maximum speed of 37.5 knots (69.5 km/h; 43.2 mph) and two Paxman Ventura 16Y JACM diesel engines rated at 2,600 kilowatts (3,500 bhp). Dat Assawari had a range of 5,700 nautical miles (10,600 km; 6,600 mi) at 17 knots (31 km/h; 20 mph).

Dat Assawari was initially armed with a triple Seacat surface-to-air missile launcher, a 4.5 in (114 mm) Mk 8 gun, a pair of single Bofors 40 mm (1.6 in) L/70 guns, an Oerlikon GDM-A turret mounting twin Oerlikon 35 mm (1.4 in) guns, and a Mk.10 Limbo Anti-submarine mortar. The frigate's sensor suite comprised Plessey AWS-1 air-search radar, Decca 629 navigation radar, two Contraves Sea Hunter fire-control radars and Types 162, 170 and 174 sonar.

=== Modifications ===
During the 1979–1981 refit, Dat Assawari's armament and sensors were both modified. The Limbo mortar was removed, its well plated over, and four single Mk I Otomat anti-ship missiles and two triple 324 mm (12.75 in) ASW torpedo tubes fitted in the space thus created. The Seacat launcher was replaced by a quadruple launcher for Aspide surface-to-air missiles. The complete sensor suite was replaced by Decca TM 1229 navigation radar, Selenia RAN-10S and RAN-12L/X air/surface search radars, two Italian fire-control radars, Thomson-CSF Diodon sonar and an Italian combat date information system were installed.

== Construction and career ==
Dat Assawari was ordered by Libya from Vosper Thornycroft in February 1968. The frigate was laid down on 27 September 1968 and launched on 13 October 1969. Following sea trials the ship performed work up training at Portland, United Kingdom. The ship sailed for Tripoli in 1973 and was commissioned on 1 February 1973. In 1979, the frigate underwent modernisation at CNR Riva Trigoso, Italy. On 29 October 1980, while undergoing modernisation, the vessel was rocked by an explosion. The vessel had been mined by swimmers from the French Service Action of SDECE. Despite the setback, the vessel's modernisation was completed after sea trials in 1983. The following year, Dat Assawari returned to Italy to undergo engine repairs which were completed in 1985. By 1989, the vessel had returned to Italy again, in a partially disarmed and non-operational state.

== Sources ==
- Blackman, Raymond V. B., ed. (1972). Jane's Fighting Ships 1972–73. London: Sampson Low, Marston & Company. OCLC 28197951.
- Cowin, Hugh (1983). The New Observer's Book of Warships (83 ed.). London, United Kingdom: Frederick Warne Ltd. ISBN 0-7232-1639-8.
- Gardiner, Robert; Chumbley, Stephen & Budzbon, Przemysław, eds. (1995). Conway's All the World's Fighting Ships 1947–1995. Annapolis, Maryland: Naval Institute Press. ISBN 1-55750-132-7.
- O'Hara, Vincent & Cernuschi, Enrico (Summer 2015). Lord, Carnes (ed.). "Frogmen Against a Fleet". Naval War College Review. 68 (3). Newport, Rhode Island: Naval War College Press. ISSN 0028-1484.
- Pugliese, Matteo (October 2022). "Operation Octopus: The Sabotage of the Dat Assawari". Naval History Magazine. US Naval Institute.
- Sharpe, Richard, ed. (1990). Jane's Fighting Ships 1990–91 (93 ed.). Surrey, United Kingdom: Jane's Information Group. ISBN 0-7106-0904-3.
