= Ikazuchi-class destroyer escort =

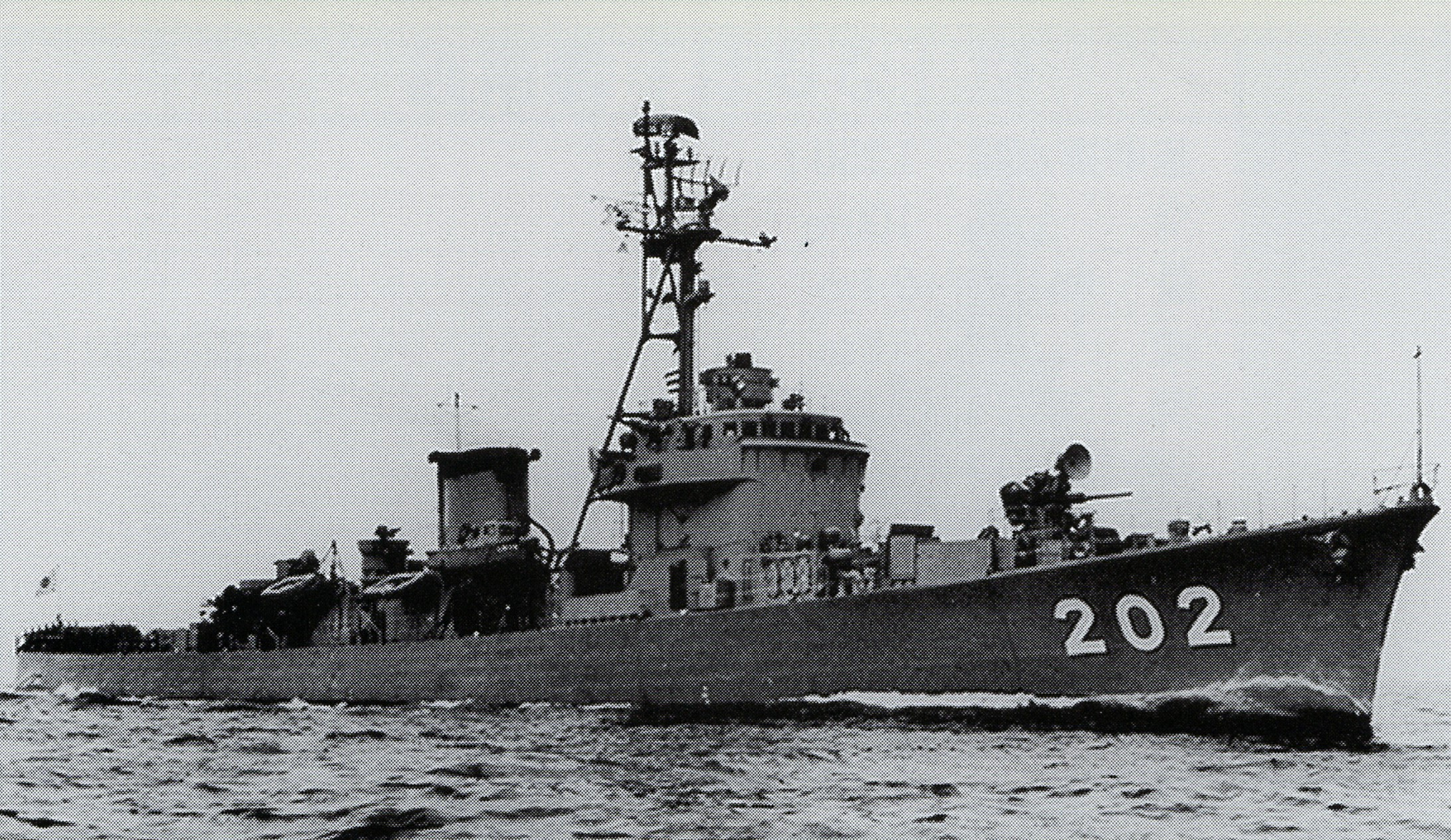
- JDS Ikazuchi

Class overview
- Name: Ikazuchi class
- Builders: Kawasaki Dockyard (1); Mitsui Shipbuilding & Eng. (1)
- Operators: Coastal Safety Force; Japan Maritime Self-Defense Force
- Preceded by: Akebono class
- Succeeded by: Isuzu class
- Built: 1954–1956
- In commission: 1956–1977
- Completed: 2
- Retired: 2

General characteristics
- Type: Destroyer escort
- Displacement: 1,080 long tons (1,097 t) standard
- Length: 87.5 m (287.1 ft)
- Beam: 8.7 m (28.5 ft)
- Draught: 3.01 m (9.9 ft)
- Propulsion: 2 × diesel engines, 2 shafts
- Speed: 25 knots
- Complement: 160
- Sensors & processing systems: OPS-2 air-search radar; OPS-3 surface-search radar; QHBa search sonar; QDA attack sonar; Mark 51 fire-control system
- Armament: 2 × 3"/50 caliber Mk.21 guns (Type 54); 2 × Bofors 40 mm anti-aircraft guns; 1 × Hedgehog anti-submarine mortar; 8 × K-gun depth charge throwers; 1 × Depth charge rack

The Ikazuchi-class destroyer escort (いかづち型護衛艦, Ikazuchigata goeikan) was a destroyer escort (or frigate) class built for the Coastal Safety Force (later Japan Maritime Self-Defense Force, JMSDF) in the late 1950s.

In the FY1953, the Japanese government ordered three destroyer escorts, JDS Akebono and ships of this class. These vessels were the first indigenous post-World War II Japanese destroyer escorts, but their propulsion systems were different because the JMSDF tried to find the best way in the propulsion systems of future surface combatants. Akebono was a steam-powered vessel, but this class was diesel-powered vessels.

So equipment of this class were almost the same as those of Akebono, with two American 3"/50 caliber Mark 21 guns (or Type 54, the Japanese version) with two Mark 22 single mounts controlled by Mark 51 director each, two Bofors 40 mm anti-aircraft guns in a dual mount, a Hedgehog anti-submarine mortar and eight K-gun depth charge throwers. And in 1959, all Mark 21 guns were replaced by Mark 22 rapid-fire guns with Mark 34 single mounts and Mark 63 GFCS was introduced in exchange for the reduction of Bofors 40 mm guns.

This class had a twin-shaft machinery installation with two diesel engines (6,000ps each). This propulsion system was less powerful than the steam turbine machinery of Akebono, but it was still able to propel the ship at a top speed of 26 knots (48 km/h; 30 mph). The JMSDF appreciated the lower cost of maintenance of machinery of this class, so every Japanese destroyer escort adopted diesel propulsion system until the period of gas turbine powered vessels.

== Ships ==
Pennant no.	Name	Laid down	Launched	Commissioned	Decommissioned	Stricken
DE-202	Ikazuchi	18 December 1954	6 September 1955	29 May 1956	31 March 1976	30 March 1983
DE-203	Inazuma	25 December 1954	4 August 1955	5 March 1956	15 March 1977	30 March 1983
