= JDS Akebono (DE-201) =

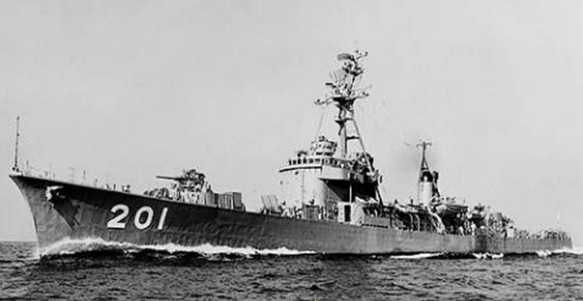
- JDS Akebono (DE-201)

Class overview
- Preceded by: Asahi class
- Succeeded by: Ikazuchi class

History

Japan
- Name: Akebono; (あけぼの)
- Builder: Ishikawajima-Harima HI
- Laid down: 10 December 1954
- Launched: 30 October 1955
- Commissioned: 20 March 1956
- Decommissioned: 1976
- Stricken: 1981

General characteristics
- Type: Destroyer escort
- Displacement: 1,075 long tons (1,092 t) standard; 1,350 long tons (1,372 t) full load
- Length: 91.8 m (301 ft 2 in) pp
- Beam: 8.5 m (27 ft 11 in)
- Draft: 3.4 m (11 ft 2 in)
- Propulsion: 2 shafts; 2× Ishikawajima geared steam turbines; 2× Ishikawajima/Foster Wheeler boilers; 18,000 shp (13,000 kW)
- Speed: 28 kn (52 km/h; 32 mph)
- Complement: 193
- Sensors & processing systems: Mark 51 fire-control system; Mark 63 fire-control system (1959)
- Armament: 2 × 3"/50 caliber guns; 4 × 40 mm AA guns; 1 × Hedgehog anti-submarine mortar; 8 × depth charge throwers (K-guns); 1 × depth charge rack

JDS Akebono (DE-201) was a destroyer escort (or frigate) of the Japanese Maritime Self-Defense Force. Akebono was one of the first indigenous Japanese warships to be built following World War II. Akebono was laid down in 1954 as a steam turbine powered "B type" ASW escort, the only ship of its class, for comparison with two similar diesel powered ships, the Ikazuchi-class destroyer escorts. Akebono entered service in 1956 and remained in use until 1976.

== Design and construction ==
The Japanese Marine Safety Force (later to become the Japanese Maritime Self-Defense Force) authorised the purchase of three "B type" escort vessels as part of the Financial Year 1953 programme. (Note: Two "A type" destroyers were also ordered as part of the FY 1953 programme.) Of the three ships, two were to be powered by diesel engines (the Ikazuchi class) and the third by steam turbines, to be called Akebono.

The equipment of the three escorts was similar, with two American 3-inch (76 mm) guns, four 40 mm Bofors guns, a Hedgehog anti-submarine projector and eight K-gun depth charge launchers. Akebono had a twin-shaft machinery installation, with geared steam turbines producing 18,000 shaft horsepower (13,000 kW) which could propel the ship at a top speed of 28 knots (52 km/h; 32 mph) compared with the 25 knots (46 km/h; 29 mph) of the less powerful Ikazuchi class.

Akebono was laid down at the Ishikawajima Tokyo shipyard on 10 December 1954. She was launched on 15 October 1955 and completed on 20 March 1956.

== Operations ==
Akebono was re-armed in March 1958, when her original 3-inch guns were replaced by more modern, autoloading 3 inch guns, with one Bofors gun, four K-guns also removed. Akebono was decommissioned in 1976.
