= List of ships of the Free French Naval Forces =

This is a list of the ships of the Free French Naval Forces.

French ships that joined the Allies in the aftermath of Operation Torch were not part of the Free French Naval Forces and are not listed here.

== Battleships ==
=== Courbet class ===
- Paris (obsolete)
- Courbet (obsolete) - scuttled during the Battle of Normandy

== French-built destroyers ==
=== Chacal class ===
- Léopard - lost 27 May 1943
- Tigre

=== Fantasque class ===
- Le Triomphant

=== Bourrasque class ===
- Mistral - lost 10 June 1944
- Ouragan

== Escorts leased by the British & Americans ==
=== Hunt class ===
- La Combattante - lost 24 February 1945

=== Flower class ===
- Aconit (K58) (ex-HMS Aconite)
- Alysse (K100) - lost 9 February 1942
- Commandant d'Estienne d'Orves (K93) (ex-HMS Lotus)
- Commandant Détroyat (K183) (ex-HMS Coriander)
- Commandant Drogou (K195) (ex-HMS Chrysanthemum)
- Lobélia (K05) (ex-HMS Lobelia)
- Mimosa (K11) (ex-HMS Mimosa) - lost 9 June 1942
- Renoncule (K117) (ex-HMS Ranunculus)
- Roselys (K57) (ex-HMS Sundew)

=== Cannon class ===
- Algérien (ex-USS Cronin (DE-107), later Oise)
- Hova (ex-USS Hova (DE-110))
- Marocain (ex-USS Marocain (DE-109))
- Sénégalais (ex-USS Corbesier (DE-106))
- Somali (ex-USS Somali (DE-111))
- Tunisien (ex-USS Crosley (DE-108))

=== River class ===
- Aventure (K263) (ex-HMS Braid)
- Croix de Lorraine (K258) (ex-HMS Strule)
- Découverte (K370) (ex-HMS Windrush)
- Escarmouche (K267) (ex-HMS Frome)
- Surprise (K292) (ex-HMS Torridge)
- Tonkinois (K260) (ex-HMS Moyola)

== Submarines ==
=== Requin class ===
- Narval

=== Saphir class ===
- Rubis

=== Redoutable class ===
- Archimède
- Argo
- Casabianca
- Le Centaure
- Le Glorieux
- Protée

=== Minerve class ===
- Iris
- Junon
- Minerve

=== British U class ===
- Curie - formerly HMS Vox (P67)

=== British V class ===
- Doris - formerly HMS Vineyard (P84)
- Morse - formerly HMS Vortex (P87)

== Avisos ==
=== Bougainville class ===
- Savorgnan de Brazza

== Minesweepers ==
=== Elan class ===
- Elan
- La Boudeuse
- Commandant Bory
- Commandant Delage
- Commandant Dominé
- Commandant Duboc
- La Gracieuse
- La Moqueuse

== Patrol vessels ==
- Poulmic - lost 7 November 1940

== Cargo ships ==
- Cagou
- Casamance
- Djudjura
- Félix Roussel
- Fort Binger
- Franche-Comté
- Gallois
- Gravelines
- Île-de-Batz
- Indochinois
- Kilissi
- PLM 22

== Sailing ships ==
- Belle Poule
- Étoile
