= Capture of Saint Pierre and Miquelon =

Takeover of overseas territories of France

- Part of the American Theatre of World War II
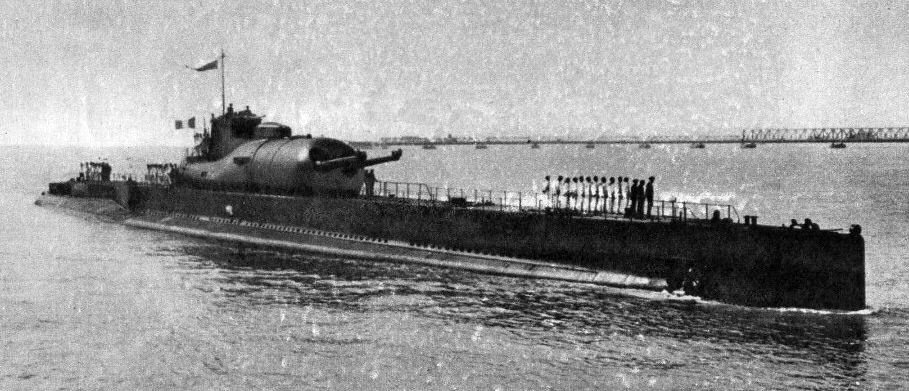
- Surcouf, the lead vessel of the flotilla
Date	24 December 1941
Location	Saint Pierre and Miquelon 46.7778°N 56.1778°W
Result	Free French victory: Saint Pierre and Miquelon captured

Belligerents
Free France	Vichy France

Commanders and leaders
Charles de Gaulle; Émile Muselier	Gilbert de Bournat; Georges Robert

Strength
1 submarine; 3 corvettes; 230 men	Gendarmerie garrison

Casualties and losses
None	None

The islands of Saint Pierre and Miquelon, a colony of France off the coast of Newfoundland, were taken over by Free French Naval Forces on 24 December 1941. At the time, the islands' authorities had sworn their allegiance to the Vichy French government.

== Prelude ==
Following the armistice of 22 June 1940, the administration of the islands had been under the control of the Vichy government, represented by the administrator Gilbert de Bournat. The presence of Vichy-administered islands off the coast of Canada caused significant concerns for its government. The Canadian government considered the possibility that the Axis might use Saint Pierre and Miquelon as a base of operations. The colony's proximity to Canada and Newfoundland (at the time a dominion separate from Canada) could offer German submariners an excellent position to re-supply and coordinate attacks upon Allied convoys. This was helped by the fact that the islands were able to communicate to the French mainland by means of wireless communication and transatlantic telegraph cables. It was feared that the islands' authorities could transmit vital information to Vichy France and inform German submarine crews about meteorological conditions, the movements of Allied warships and the progression of convoys. There was also concern that local fishery products could be sent to Germany through mainland France and, in turn, contribute to the Axis war effort.

Even before the armistice, the government of Newfoundland called for an invasion of Saint Pierre and Miquelon. After consultations with the United Kingdom, it was recommended that Newfoundland should discuss the issue with the Canadian government. However, an invasion did not come to fruition as Canada's War Cabinet refused to initiate an action for fear of offending the American State Department, although the Canadian military secretly prepared an expeditionary unit, "Force Q", to prepare to carry out an invasion. Concerns grew throughout 1941 as the Battle of the Atlantic reached Canadian waters. The Canada–United States Permanent Joint Board on Defence had unanimously agreed on 10 November 1941 that the existence of an uncontrolled and high-powered wireless transmitting station on the islands constituted a potential danger to the interests of Canada and the United States. However, the United States vigorously opposed any forceful attempt to take control of the islands, seeing such action as undermining its asserted sovereignty over the Western Hemisphere and inviting war into the northwest Atlantic.

During this time, Charles de Gaulle sent Admiral Émile Muselier to investigate the possibility of invading the islands. Despite continued objections from the United States, de Gaulle ordered the capture of Saint Pierre and Miquelon.

== Capture ==
On 23 December 1941, a French flotilla consisting of the submarine Surcouf and three corvettes, Mimosa, Aconit and Alysse, carrying 230 men sailed from Halifax under the pretext of a training mission. Acting against the orders of Royal Canadian Navy Rear Admiral Leonard W. Murray, at 3 am on 24 December 1941, the flotilla arrived off the port of Saint-Pierre and disembarked 230 armed sailors. After meeting no resistance, the Free French forces captured the islands in only 20 minutes.

== Aftermath ==
After the arrest of Governor de Bournat, the Free French authorities organized a plebiscite on 25 December 1941. Males of 18 years and over were given a choice of "rallying to Free France or collaborating with Axis powers". Close to 98 per cent of the male population voted in favour of Free French administration.

News of the capture reached the United States with Secretary of State Cordell Hull calling the capture a violation of prior agreements between the US and Allied powers and of US territorial doctrine, asserting that it was a "provocation to war in American waters between Vichy and de Gaulle," and comparing the Free French takeover to Axis aggression. The US considered dispatching naval forces to remove the Free French forces, but ultimately chose to propose a compromise that would see the islands demilitarized under US, British and Canadian supervision, with Free French ships redeploying to the Atlantic theatre.

In January of 1942, Canada demobilized Force Q, foreclosing the possibility that it would invade the islands. The dispute with the US formally came to an end in February of 1942 following Hull's recommendation to drop the matter for the duration of the war in the interest of unity among the Allied forces. Historians Cecil Lingard and Reginald Trotter criticized Hull's role in creating the dispute with the Free French, arguing that his personal hubris and inflated sense of US hegemony created an unnecessary conflict between allies.

== See also ==
- Battle of Réunion (28 November 1942)

== Source ==
- Aron, Robert (1964). Grands dossiers de l'histoire contemporaine. Paris: CAL (Club des amis du livre).
