= French ship Boulonnais =

At least two ships of the French Navy have been named Boulonnais:

- French destroyer Boulonnais, a L'Adroit-class destroyer launched in 1927 and sunk in 1942.
- French frigate Boulonnais, a Le Corse-class frigate launched in 1953 and expended as a target in 1994.
