= French ship Brestois =

At least two ships of the French Navy have been named Brestois:

- French destroyer Brestois, a L'Adroit-class destroyer launched in 1927 and sunk in 1942.
- French frigate Le Brestois, a Le Corse-class frigate launched in 1952 and expended as a target in 1976 .
