= French submarine Surcouf =

French cruiser submarine (launched 1929)

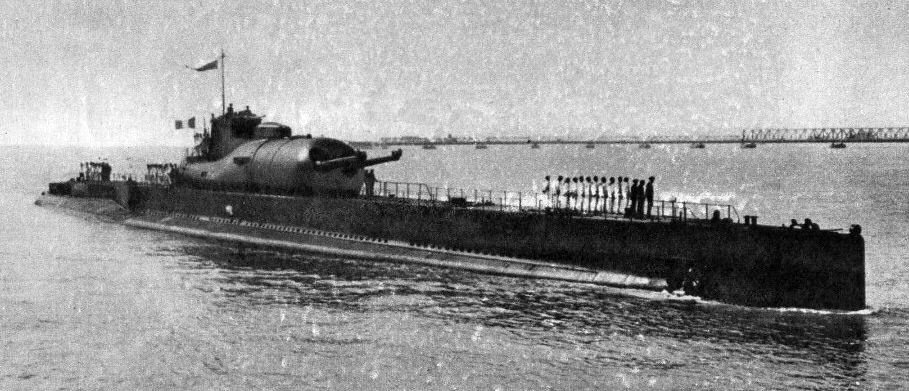
- Surcouf c. 1935

History

France
- Name: Surcouf
- Namesake: Robert Surcouf
- Ordered: 4 August 1926
- Builder: Cherbourg Arsenal
- Laid down: 1 July 1927
- Launched: 18 November 1929
- Commissioned: 16 April 1934
- In service: 1934–1942
- Refit: 1941
- Identification: Pennant number: N N 3; Designation number: 17P
- Honors and awards: Resistance Medal with rosette
- Fate: Disappeared, 18 February 1942

General characteristics
- Type: Cruiser submarine
- Displacement: 3,250 long tons (3,302 t) (surfaced); 4,304 long tons (4,373 t) (submerged); 2,880 long tons (2,926 t) (dead)
- Length: 110 m (361 ft)
- Beam: 9 m (29 ft 6 in)
- Draft: 7.25 m (23 ft 9 in)
- Installed power: 7,600 hp (5,700 kW) (surfaced); 3,400 hp (2,500 kW) (submerged)
- Propulsion: 2 × Sulzer diesel engines (surfaced); 2 × Electric motors (submerged); 2 × Propellers
- Speed: 18.5 knots (34.3 km/h; 21.3 mph) (surfaced); 10 kn (19 km/h; 12 mph) (submerged)
- Range: Surfaced: 18,500 km (10,000 nmi; 11,500 mi) at 10 kn (19 km/h; 12 mph); 12,600 km (6,800 nmi; 7,800 mi) at 13.5 kn (25.0 km/h; 15.5 mph); Submerged: 130 km (70 nmi; 81 mi) at 4.5 kn (8.3 km/h; 5.2 mph); 110 km (59 nmi; 68 mi) at 5 kn (9.3 km/h; 5.8 mph)
- Endurance: 90 days
- Test depth: 80 m (260 ft)
- Boats & landing craft carried: 2 × motorboats in watertight deck well
- Capacity: 280 long tons (284 t)
- Complement: 8 officers and 110 men
- Armament: 2 × 203 mm (8 in) guns (1 × 2); 2 × 37 mm (1.5 in) anti-aircraft guns (2 × 1); 4 × 13.2 mm (0.52 in) anti-aircraft machine guns (2 × 2); 6 × 550 mm (22 in) torpedo tubes; 4 × 400 mm (16 in) torpedo tubes
- Aircraft carried: 1 × Besson MB.411 floatplane
- Aviation facilities: Hangar

Surcouf French pronunciation: [syʁ.kuf] was a large French gun-armed cruiser submarine of the mid 20th century. She carried two 203 mm guns as well as anti-aircraft guns and (for most of her career) a floatplane. Surcouf served in the French Navy and, later, the Free French Naval Forces during the Second World War.

Surcouf disappeared during the night of 18/19 February 1942 in the Caribbean Sea, possibly after colliding with the US freighter Thompson Lykes, although this has not been definitely established. She was named after the French privateer and shipowner Robert Surcouf. She was the largest submarine built until surpassed by the first Japanese I-400 class aircraft carrier submarine in 1944.

== Design ==
The Washington Naval Treaty had placed strict limits on naval construction by the major naval powers regarding the displacement and artillery calibers of battleships and cruisers. However, no agreements were reached regarding light ships such as frigates, destroyers, or submarines. In addition, to ensure the country's protection and that of the empire, France started the construction of an important submarine fleet (79 units in 1939). Surcouf was intended to be the first of a class of three submarine cruisers; however, she was the only one completed.

The missions revolved around:

- Ensuring contact with the French colonies;
- In collaboration with French naval squadrons, searching for and destroying enemy fleets;
- Pursuing enemy convoys.

== Technical Details ==
=== Ship dimensions ===
Surcouf had a length of 110 meters (361 feet), a beam of 9 meters (29 feet 6 inches), and a draught of 7.25 meters (23 feet 9 inches). Her overall height was 15 meters (49 feet). She displaced 3,304 tonnes when surfaced and 4,304 tonnes when submerged. The submarine was rated for a test depth of 80 meters (260 feet) and carried a complement of 118 officers and men.

=== Propulsion ===
Surcouf was powered on the surface by two Sulzer diesel engines producing a total of 7,600 horsepower, driving two propeller shafts. When submerged, she switched to two electric motors delivering 3,400 horsepower. This allowed for a maximum surface speed of 18.5 knots (34.3 km/h) and a submerged speed of 8.5 knots (15.7 km/h). Her operational range was 10,000 nautical miles (19,000 km) at 10 knots, making her suitable for oceanic patrols.

=== Armament ===
Surcouf's main armament was a unique twin turret of 203 mm (8-inch) guns, a very large caliber for a submarine, exceeded only by HMS M1's 305 mm (12-inch) gun. The 8 inch caliber guns were the largest permitted under Article 12 of the Washington Naval Treaty for vessels not to be classed as a capital ship. The guns had a range of up to 26,000 m (16 mi) and could be fired only while surfaced. For close-in defense, she carried two 37 mm anti-aircraft guns and four 13.2 mm machine guns. Her torpedo armament included four 550 mm tubes in the bow and two turrets with a single 550 mm tube and two 400 mm tubes each on the stern. Surcouf also carried a Besson MB.411 floatplane in a watertight hangar, launched by catapult for reconnaissance and gunfire spotting.

Eight 550 mm and four 400 mm reloads were carried. The 203 mm Modèle 1924 guns were in a pressure-tight turret forward of the conning tower. The guns had a 60-round magazine capacity and were controlled by a director with a 5 m (16 ft) rangefinder, mounted high enough to view an 11 km (5.9 nmi; 6.8 mi) horizon, and able to fire within three minutes after surfacing. Using the boat's periscopes to direct the fire of the main guns, Surcouf could increase the visible range to 16 km (8.6 nmi; 9.9 mi); originally an elevating platform was supposed to lift lookouts 15 m (49 ft) high, but this design was abandoned quickly due to the effect of roll. The Besson observation plane could be used to direct fire out to the guns' 15.9 mi (13.8 nmi; 25.6 km) maximum range. Anti-aircraft cannon and machine guns were mounted on the top of the hangar.

Surcouf also carried a 4.5 m (14 ft 9 in) motorboat, and contained a cargo compartment with fittings to restrain 40 prisoners or lodge 40 passengers. The submarine's fuel tanks were very large; having enough fuel for a 10,000 nmi (19,000 km; 12,000 mi) range and supplies for 90-day patrols. The first commanding officer was Frigate Captain (Capitaine de Frégate, a rank equivalent to Commander) Raymond de Belot.

The boat encountered several technical challenges:

- Because of the low height of the rangefinder above the water surface, the practical range of fire was 12,000 m (13,000 yd) with the rangefinder, increased to 16,000 m (17,000 yd) with sighting aided by periscope, well below the guns' maximum range of 26,000 m (28,000 yd).
- The duration between the surface order and the first firing round was 3 minutes and 35 seconds. This duration would be longer if the boat were to fire broadside, which meant surfacing and training the turret in the desired direction.
- Firing had to occur at a precise moment of pitch and roll when the ship was level.
- Training the turret to either side was impossible when the ship rolled 8° or more.
- Surcouf could not fire accurately at night, as fall of shot could not be observed in the dark.
- The guns' ready magazines had to be reloaded after firing 14 rounds from each gun.

To replace the floatplane, whose use was initially limited, trials were conducted with an autogyro in 1938.

== Appearance ==
From the beginning of the boat's career until 1932, the boat was painted the same grey colour as surface warships, but thereafter in Prussian dark blue, a colour which was retained until the end of 1940 when it was repainted with two tones of grey, serving as camouflage on the hull and conning tower.

Successive configurations of Surcouf
Original configuration, 1932

1934 configuration, with Prussian blue paintwork

1938 configuration: radio mast removed and different conning tower

1940 configuration, with two-tone gray paint and 17P identification number on the conning tower

== Career ==
=== Early career ===
Soon after Surcouf was launched, the London Naval Treaty finally placed restrictions on submarine designs. Among other things, each signatory (France included) was permitted to possess no more than three large submarines, each not exceeding 2,800 long tons (2,845 t) standard displacement, with guns not exceeding 6.1 in (150 mm) in caliber. Surcouf, which would have exceeded these limits, was specially exempt from the rules at the insistence of Navy Minister Georges Leygues, but other 'big-gun' submarines of this boat's class could no longer be built.

=== Second World War ===
Seizure of Surcouf
- Part of World War II
Date	3 July 1940
Location	Plymouth, England, United Kingdom
Result	British capture of Surcouf

Belligerents
United Kingdom	France

Commanders and leaders
(United Kingdom) H. L. Jenkin	(France) Captain Martin

Casualties and losses
3 killed	1 killed

In 1940, Surcouf was based in Cherbourg, but in May, when the Germans invaded, she was being refitted in Brest following a mission in the Antilles and Gulf of Guinea. Under the command of Frigate Captain Martin, unable to dive and with only one engine functioning and a jammed rudder, she limped across the English Channel and sought refuge in Plymouth.

On 3 July, the British, concerned that the German Kriegsmarine would take over the French Fleet at the French armistice, executed Operation Catapult. The Royal Navy blockaded the harbours where French warships were anchored, and delivered an ultimatum: rejoin the fight against Germany, be put out of reach of the Germans, or scuttle. Few accepted willingly; the North African fleet at Mers-el-Kebir and the ships based at Dakar (French West Africa) refused. The French battleships in North Africa were eventually attacked and all but one sunk at their moorings by the Mediterranean Fleet.

French ships lying at ports in Britain and Canada were also boarded by armed marines, sailors and soldiers, but the only serious incident took place at Plymouth aboard Surcouf on 3 July, when two Royal Navy submarine officers, Commander Denis 'Lofty' Sprague, captain of HMS Thames, and Lieutenant Patrick Griffiths of HMS Rorqual, and French warrant officer mechanic Yves Daniel were fatally wounded, and a British seaman, Albert Webb, was shot dead by the submarine's doctor.

=== Free French Naval Forces ===
By August 1940, the British completed Surcouf's refit and turned her over to the Free French Naval Forces (Forces Navales Françaises Libres, FNFL) for convoy patrol. The only officer not repatriated from the original crew, Frigate Captain Georges Louis Blaison, became the new commanding officer. Because of Anglo-French tensions over the submarine, each side accused the other of spying for Vichy France; the British also claimed that Surcouf was attacking British ships. Later, a British officer and two sailors were put aboard for "liaison" purposes. One real drawback was that she required a crew of 110–130 men, which was equivalent to three crews of more conventional submarines. This led to the Royal Navy's reluctance to recommission her.

Surcouf then went to the Canadian base at Halifax, Nova Scotia and escorted trans-Atlantic convoys. In April 1941, she was damaged by a German plane at Devonport. On 28 July, Surcouf went to the Portsmouth Naval Shipyard at Kittery, Maine for a three-month refit. After leaving the shipyard, Surcouf went to New London, Connecticut, perhaps to receive additional training for her crew. Surcouf left New London on 27 November to return to Halifax.

=== Capture of St. Pierre and Miquelon ===
In December 1941, Surcouf carried the Free French Admiral Émile Muselier to Canada, putting into Quebec City. While the Admiral was in Ottawa, conferring with the Canadian government, Surcouf's captain was approached by The New York Times reporter Ira Wolfert and questioned about the rumours the submarine would liberate Saint-Pierre and Miquelon for Free France. Wolfert accompanied the submarine to Halifax, where, on 20 December, they joined Free French "Escorteurs" corvettes Mimosa, Aconit, and Alysse, and on 24 December, took control of the islands for Free France without resistance.

United States Secretary of State Cordell Hull had just concluded an agreement with the Vichy government guaranteeing the neutrality of French possessions in the Western hemisphere, and he threatened to resign unless President of the United States Franklin D. Roosevelt demanded a restoration of the status quo. Roosevelt did so, but when Charles de Gaulle refused, Roosevelt dropped the matter. Ira Wolfert's stories – very favourable to the Free French (and bearing no sign of kidnapping or other duress) – helped swing American popular opinion away from the Vichy government. The Axis Powers' declaration of war on the United States in December 1941 negated the agreement. Still, the United States did not sever diplomatic ties with the Vichy Government until November 1942.

=== Later operations ===
In January 1942, the Free French leadership decided to send Surcouf to the Pacific theatre, after she had been re-supplied at the Royal Naval Dockyard in Bermuda. However, her movement south triggered rumours that Surcouf would liberate Martinique from the Vichy regime. In fact, Surcouf was bound for Sydney, Australia, via Tahiti. She departed Halifax on 2 February for Bermuda, which she left on 12 February, bound for the Panama Canal.

=== Fate ===
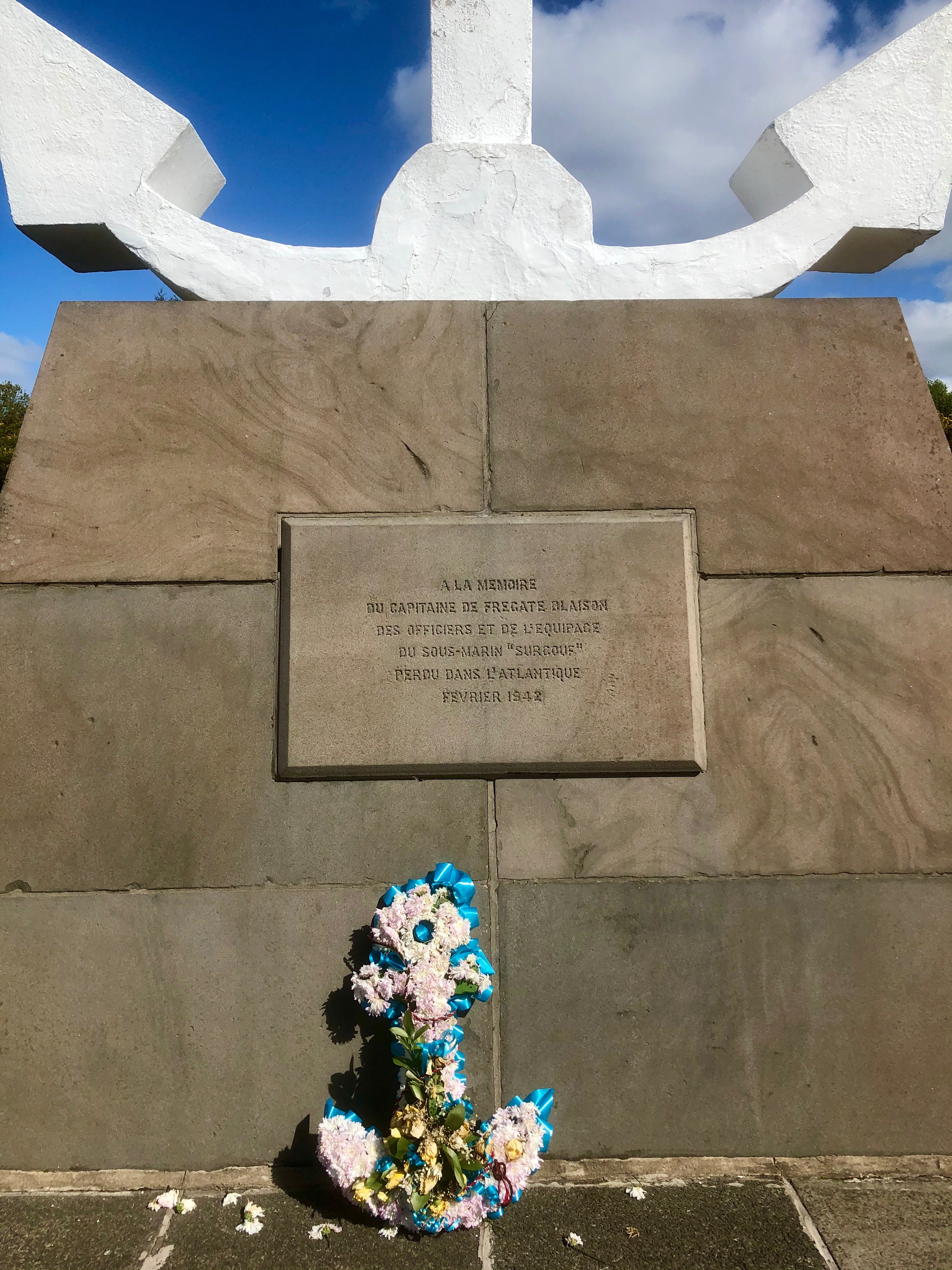
The Free French Memorial on Lyle Hill, Greenock: À la mémoire du Capitaine de frégate Blaison, des officiers et de l'équipage du sous-marin Surcouf perdu dans l'Atlantique Février 1942 ("To the memory of Frigate Captain Blaison, the officers[,] and the crew of the submarine Surcouf[,] lost in the Atlantic February 1942").

Surcouf vanished on the night of 18/19 February 1942, about 130 km (70 nmi) north of Cristóbal, Panama, while en route for Tahiti, via the Panama Canal. An American report concluded the disappearance was due to an accidental collision with the American freighter Thompson Lykes. Steaming alone from Guantanamo Bay on what was a very dark night, the freighter reported hitting and running down a partially submerged object, which scraped along her side and keel. Her lookouts heard people in the water, but, thinking she had hit a U-boat, the freighter did not stop, although cries for help were heard in English. A signal was sent to Panama describing the incident.

The loss resulted in 130 deaths (including 4 Royal Navy personnel), under the command of Frigate Captain Georges Louis Nicolas Blaison. The loss of Surcouf was announced by the Free French Headquarters in London on 18 April 1942, and was reported in The New York Times the next day. It was not reported Surcouf was sunk as the result of a collision with the Thompson Lykes until January 1945. The investigation of the French commission concluded that the disappearance was the consequence of a misunderstanding. A Consolidated PBY, patrolling the same waters on the night of 18/19 February, could have attacked Surcouf believing her to be German or Japanese.

Inquiries into the incident were haphazard and late, while a later French inquiry supported the idea that the sinking had been due to "friendly fire"; this conclusion was supported by Rear Admiral Gabriel Auphan in his book The French Navy in World War II. Charles de Gaulle stated in his memoirs that Surcouf "had sunk with all hands".

=== Legacy ===
Possible site of the Surcouf's sinking, if she collided with the Thompson Lykes.

As no one has officially dived or verified the wreck of Surcouf, her location is unknown. If one assumes the Thompson Lykes incident was indeed the event of Surcouf's sinking, then the wreck would lie 3,000 m (9,800 ft) deep at 10°40′N 79°32′W.

A monument commemorates the loss in the port of Cherbourg in Normandy, France. The Free French Memorial also commemorates the loss on Lyle Hill in Greenock, Scotland.

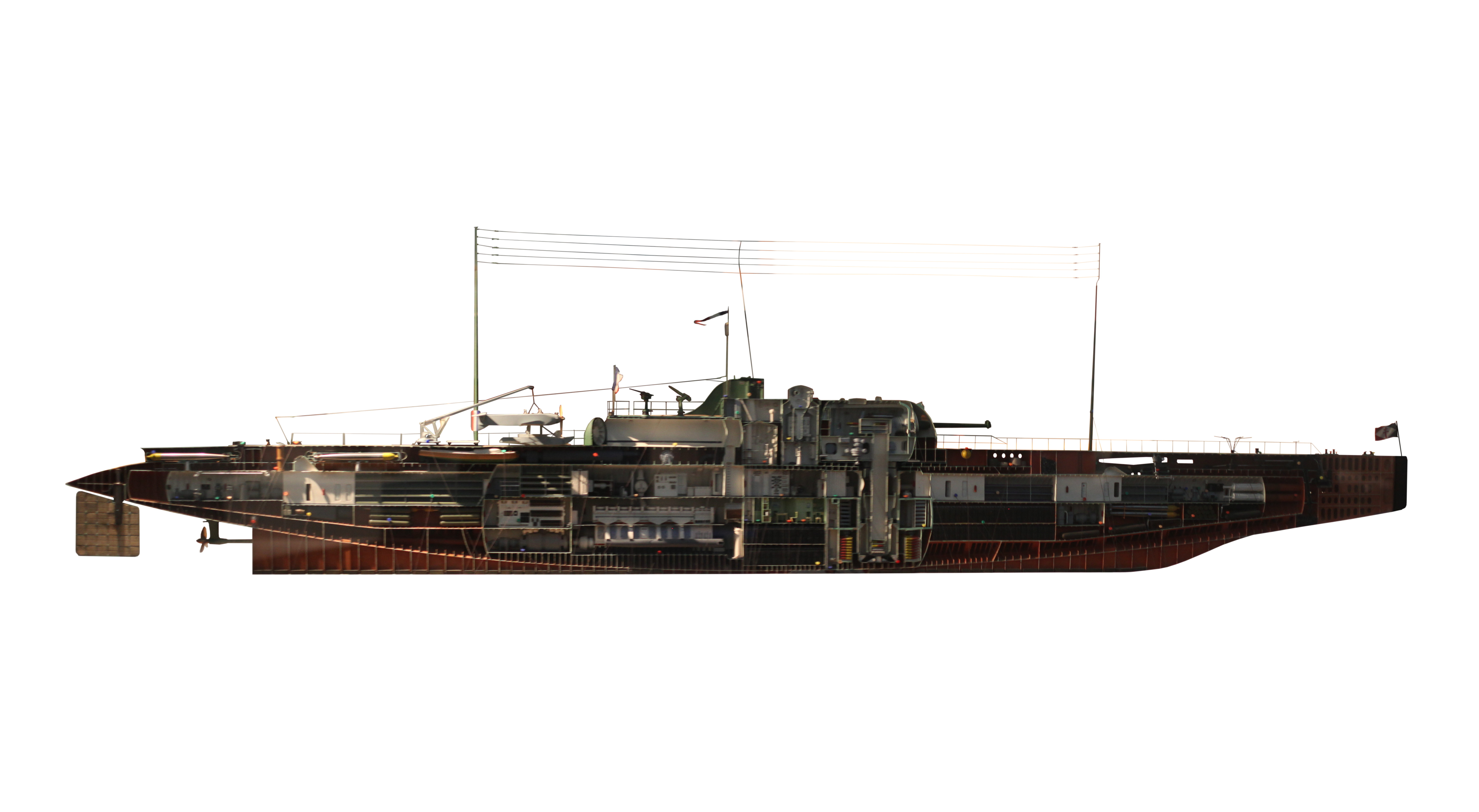
Model of Surcouf in Paris.

As there is no conclusive evidence that Thompson Lykes collided with Surcouf and her wreck has yet to be discovered, there are alternative stories about her fate. James Rusbridger examined some of these theories in his book Who Sank Surcouf?, finding them all easily dismissible except one: the records of the 6th Heavy Bomber Group operating out of Panama show them sinking a large submarine the morning of 19 February. Since no German submarine was lost in the area on that date, she could have been Surcouf. He suggested the collision had damaged Surcouf's radio and the stricken boat limped towards Panama, hoping for the best.

The captain of the Surcouf during its doomed voyage has a ship named after him, which is the French aviso Commandant Blaison.

A conspiracy theory, based on no significant evidence, held that the Surcouf, during her stationing at New London in late 1941, had been caught treacherously supplying a German U-boat in Long Island Sound, pursued by the American training subs Marlin and Mackerel out of New London, and sunk. The rumor circulated into the early 21st century, but is false since the Surcouf's later movements south are well documented.

=== In popular media ===
The Surcouf is the subject of an underwater search by the fictional organization NUMA and international terrorists in the Clive Cussler novel "The Corsican Shadow", published in 2023. The author Dirk Cussler, writes the Surcouf's wreck was discovered "...some eighty miles off the Panama coast." The sinking is even attributed to Surcouf's radio antenna being damaged in the collision with the Thompson Lykes, and then finished off by the reported attack of an A-17 bomber the next morning. Douglas Reeman wrote "Strike from the Sea", a novel published in 1978, about a French cruiser submarine named Soufriere, modeled on the Surcouf.

== Honors ==
- Médaille de la Résistance avec Rosette (Resistance Medal with rosette) - 29 November 1946
- Cited in Orders of Corps of the Army - 4 August 1945
- Cited in Orders of the Navy - 8 January 1947

== See also ==
- French submarines of World War II
- Fusiliers Marins
- Georges Cabanier
- HM Submarine X1
- HMS M2 (1918)
- Japanese I-400-class submarine
- USS Dorado (SS-248), a US submarine sunk in the same area under similar circumstances
- List of submarines of France
- Submarine aircraft carrier

== Bibliography ==
- Jurens, W. J. (1986). "Question 18/85". Warship International. XXIII (3): 312–314. ISSN 0043-0374.
- Roberts, John; et al. (Conway's All the World's Fighting Ships, 1922-1946) (1980). "Surcouf". France. Annapolis: US Naval Institute Press.
