= List of escorteurs of France =

The escorteurs of the French Navy were light naval warships used for convoy protection during and after the Second World War.

The earliest escorteurs in the French Navy were purchased from the British Royal Navy and the United States Navy. After the war, these were supplemented by former German and Italian vessels transferred to French control as war reparations.

After the war, the term escorteur replaced that of torpilleur and contre-torpilleur traditionally used by the French Navy. However, in the 1970s, the designation of escorteur ceased to be used and was replaced with that of frigate, destroyer, aviso or patroller.

== Second World War ships ==
- Royal Navy:
  - River-class frigate (Free French Naval Forces)
    - L'Aventure (F707) (ex-HMS Braid) 1944–1961
    - L'Escarmouche (F709) (ex-HMS Frome) 1944–1961
    - Tonkinois (F711) (ex-HMS Moyola) 1944–1961
    - Croix de Lorraine (F710) (ex-HMS Strule) 1944–1961
    - La Surprise (F708) (ex-HMS Torridge) 1944–1964
    - La Découverte (F712) (ex-HMS Windrush) 1944–1961
  - Flower-class corvettes (Free French Naval Forces)
    - Alysse (ex-HMS Alyssum K100) 1941–1942
    - Roselys (ex-HMS Sundew) 1941–1947
    - Aconit (ex-HMS Aconite) 1941–1947
    - Lobelia (ex-Lobelia) 1941–1947
    - Mimosa (ex-Mimosa) 1941–1942
    - Commandant Détroyat (Ex-HMS Coriander) 1941–1947
    - Commandant d'Estienne d'Orves (ex-HMS Lotus) 1942–1947
    - Renoncule (ex-HMS Renonculus) 1941–1947
    - Commandant Drogou (ex-HMS Chrysanthemum) 1941–1947
- United States Navy (USN):
  - Cannon-class destroyer escort:
    - Sénégalais (F702) (ex-USS Corbesier (DE-106)) 1944–1964
    - Algérien (F701) (ex-USS Cronin (DE-107)) 1944–1964
    - Tunisien (F706) (ex-USS Crosley (DE-108)) 1944–1960
    - Marocain (F705) (ex-USS Marocain (DE-109)) 1944–1960
    - Hova (F704) (ex-USS Hova (DE-110)) 1944–1964
    - Somali (F703) (ex-USS Somali (DE-111)) 1944–1956
  - PC-461-class submarine chaser (or coastal patroller):
    - Eveillé (ex-USS PC-471) 1944–1959
    - Rusé (ex-USS PC-472) 1944–1959
    - Ardent (ex-USS PC-473) 1944–1945
    - Indiscret (ex-USS PC-474) 1944–1960
    - Résolu (ex-USS PC475) 1944–1951
    - Emporté (ex-USS PC-480) 1944–1959
    - Effronté (ex-USS PC481) 1944–1953
    - Enjoué (ex-USS PC-482) 1944–1945
    - Tirailleur (ex-USS PC-542) 1944–1958
    - Volontaire (ex-USS PC-543) 1944–1964
    - Goumier (ex-USS PC-545) 1944–1965
    - Franc Tireur (ex-USS PC-545) 1944–1953
    - Vigilant (ex-USS PC-550) 1944–1959
    - Mameluck (ex-USS PC-551) 1944–1958
    - Carabinier (ex-USS PC-556) 1944–1958
    - Dragon (ex-USS PC-557) 1944–1959
    - Voltigeur (ex-USS PC-559) 1944–1970
    - Attentif (ex-USS PC-562) 1944–1953
    - Spahi (ex-USS PC-591) 1944–1959
    - Fantassin (ex-USS PC-621) 1944–1961
    - Grenadier (ex-USS PC-625) 1944–1958
    - Lansquenet (ex-USS PC-626) 1944–1958
    - Cavalier (ex-USS PC-627) 1944–1951

== Post-war ships ==
=== War reparations ===
- Ex-Regia Marina:
  - Capitani Romani-class light cruiser:
    - Châteaurenault (ex-Italian cruiser Attilio Regolo) (Note: named for Marcus Atilius Regulus)) 1948–1969
    - Guichen (ex-Italian cruiser Scipione Africano) 1948–1961
  - Oriani-class destroyer:
    - French destroyer D'Estaing (ex-Italian destroyer Alfredo Oriani) 1948–1954
  - Sloop :
    - Francis Garnier (F730) (ex-Italian sloop Eritrea) 1946–1966
- Ex-Kriegsmarine:
  - Type 1934A destroyer:
    - Desaix (Note: named for Louis Desaix) (ex-German destroyer Z5 Paul Jacobi) 1946–1954
    - Kléber (D603) (Note: named for Jean-Baptiste Kléber) (ex-German destroyer Z6 Theodor Riedel) 1946–1957
  - Type 1936A and 1936A (Mob) destroyer
    - Marceau (D601) (ex-German destroyer Z31) 1946–1958
    - Hoche (D602) (ex-German destroyer Z25) 1946–1958
    - Léopard (ex-German destroyer Z23) 1945–1951 (Refloated for spares, then scrapped)
    - Q-128 (ex-US destroyer DD-939, ex-German destroyer Z39) 1947–1958
  - Type 35 torpedo boat:
    - Bir Hacheim (ex-German torpedo boat T11)
  - Type 37 torpedo boat:
    - Baccarat (ex-German torpedo boat T20)
    - Dompaire (ex-German torpedo boat T14)
  - Type 39 torpedo boat:
    - L'Alsacien (ex-German torpedo boat T23)
    - Le Lorrain (ex-German torpedo boat T28)

=== Allied fleet ships ===
- United States Navy (USN):
  - Cannon-class destroyer escort:
    - Berbère (F723) (ex-USS Clarence L. Evans (DE-113)) 1952–1969
    - Arabe (F717) (ex-USS Samuel S. Miles (DE-183)) 1950–1958
    - Kabyle (F718) (ex-USS Riddle (DE-185)) 1950–1959
    - Bambara (F719) (ex-USS Swearer (DE-186)) 1950–1959
    - Malgache (F724) (ex-USS Baker (DE-190)) 1952–1969
    - Sakalave (F720) (ex-USS Wingfield (DE-194)) 1950–1959
    - Touareg (F721) (ex-USS Bright (DE-747)) 1950–1958
    - Soudanais (F722) (ex-USS Cates (DE-763)) 1950–1959
  - Tacoma-class frigate:
    - Laplace (F713) (ex-USS Lorain (PF-93)) 1947–1950
    - Mermoz (F714) (ex-USS Muskegon (PF-24)) 1947–1950
    - Brix (F715) (ex-USS Manitowoc (PF-61)) 1947–1958
    - Verrier (F716) (ex-USS Emporia (PF-28)) 1947–1958
  - PC-461-class submarine chaser (or coastal patroller):
    - Phnom Penh (ex-USS PC-796) 1949–1955
    - Hue (ex-USS PC-797) 1950–1955
    - Luang Prabang (ex-USS PC-798) 1949–1955
    - Kum Kang San (ex-USS PC-799) 1950–
    - Flamberge (ex-USS PC-1086) 1951–1956
    - Intrépide (ex-USS PC-1130) 1951–1956
    - Trident (ex-USS PC-1143) 1951–1956
    - Mousquet (ex-USS PC-1143) 1951–1955
    - Glaive (ex-USS PC-1146) 1951–1956
    - Ardent (ex-USS PC-1167) 1951–1956
    - Inconstant (ex-USS PC-1171) 1951–1956
    - Légionnaire(ex-USS PC-1226) 1944–1958
    - Lancier (ex-USS PC-1227) 1944–1960
    - Hussard (ex-USS PC-1235) 1945–1965
    - Sabre (ex-USS PC-1248) 1944–1959
    - Pique (ex-USS PC-1249) 1944–1959
    - Cimeterre (ex-USS PC-1250) 1944–1963
    - Coutelas (ex-USS PC-1560) 1944–1963
    - Dague (ex-USS PC-1561) 1944–1964
    - Javelot (ex-USS PC-1562) 1944–1951

== French-built ships ==
=== Fleet Escorts – (Escorteurs d'escadre) ===
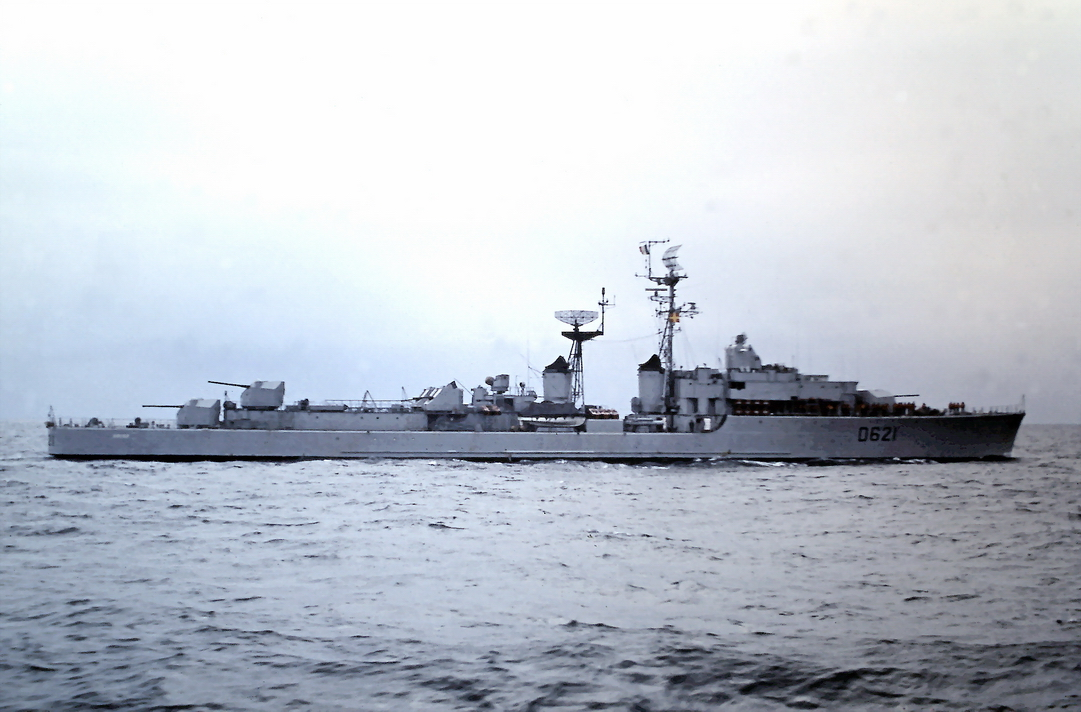
Surcouf

- T 47 class (Surcouf class)
  - Surcouf (D621) 1955–1972
  - Kersaint (D622) 1956–1984
  - Cassard (D623) 1956–1974
  - Bouvet (D624) 1956–1982
  - Dupetit-Thouars (D625) 1957–1988
  - Chevalier Paul (D626) 1957–1971
  - Maillé-Brézé (D627) 1957–1988
  - Vauquelin (D628) 1956–1986
  - D’Estrées (D629) 1957–1985
  - Du Chayla (D630) 1957–1991
  - Casabianca (D631) 1957–1984
  - Guépratte (D632) 1957–1985
- T 53 class
  - Duperré (D633) 1957–1972
  - La Bourdonnais (D634) 1958–1976
  - Forbin (D635) 1958–1981
  - Tartu (D636) 1958–1979
  - Jauréguiberry (D637) 1958–1977
- T 56-class destroyer – single ship modified for ASW testing
  - La Galissonnière (D638) 1962–1990

=== Fast Escorts – Escorteurs rapides ===
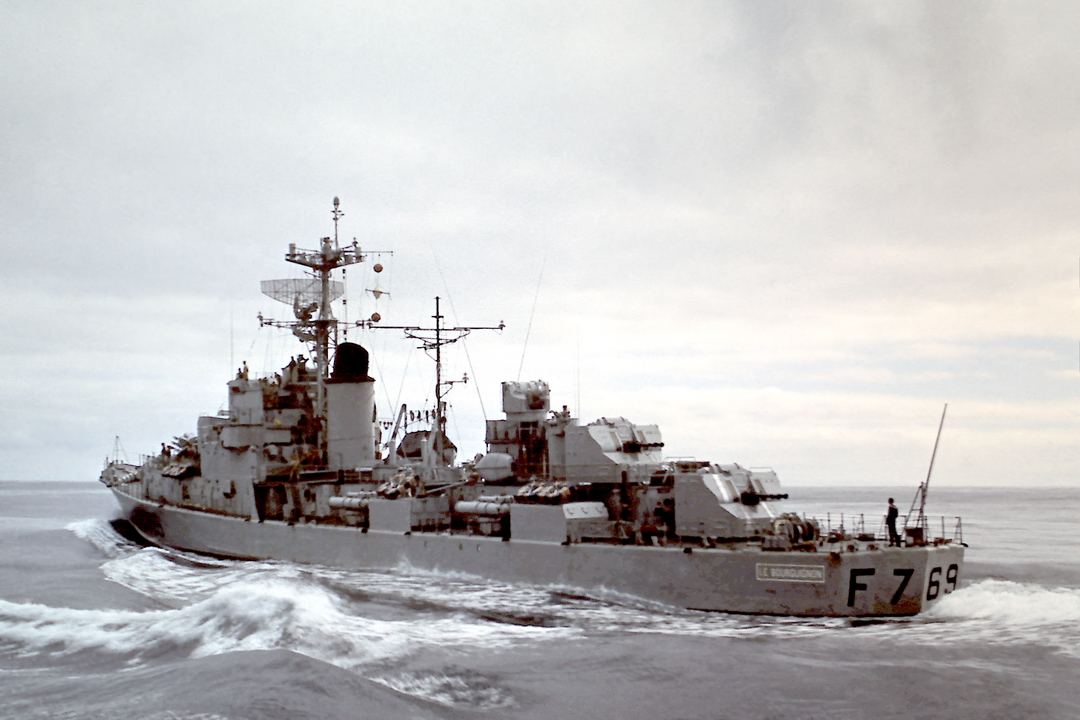
Le Bourguignon

- Type E50 (Le Corse-class) frigate:
  - Le Corse (F761) 1955–1975
  - Le Brestois (F762) 1956–1975
  - Le Boulonnais (F763) 1955–1976
  - Le Bordelais (F764) 1955–1976
- Type E52 (Le Normand-class) frigate:
  - Le Normand (F765) 1956–1983
  - Le Picard (F766) 1956–1979
  - Le Gascon (F767) 1957–1977
  - Le Lorrain (F768) 1957–1976
  - Le Bourguignon (F769) 1957–1976
  - Le Champenois (F770) 1957–1975
  - Le Savoyard (F771) 1957–1980
  - Le Breton (F772) 1957–1976
  - Le Basque (F773) 1957–1979
  - L'Agenais (F774) 1958–1985
  - Le Béarnais (F775) 1958–1979
- Type E52B:
  - L'Alsacien (F776) 1960–1981
  - Le Provençal (F777) 1959–1981
  - Le Vendéen (F778) 1960–1982

=== Sloop Escorts – Avisos escorteurs ===
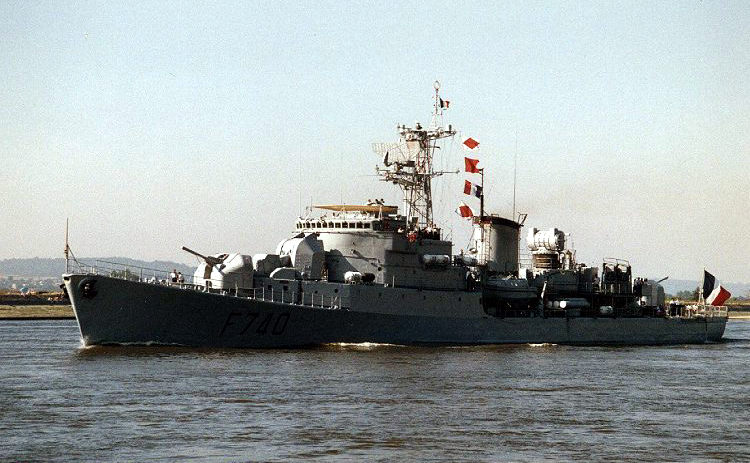
Commandant Bourdais

- Commandant Rivière-class frigate
  - Victor Schœlcher (F725) (Note: after Victor Schœlcher (1804–1893)) 1962–1988
  - Commandant Bory (F726) (Note: after Victor Bory) 1964–1996
  - Amiral Charner (F727) (Note: after Léonard Charner (1797–1869)) 1962–1990
  - Doudart de Lagrée (F728) (Note: after Ernest Doudart de Lagrée (1823–1868)) 1963–1991
  - Balny (F729) (Note: after Adrien-Paul Balny d'Avricourt (1849–1873)) 1970–1994
  - Commandant Rivière (F733) (Note: after Henri Rivière (1827–1883)) 1962–1984
  - Commandant Bourdais (F740) (Note: after Edmé Bourdais (1820–1861)) 1963–1990
  - Protet (F748) (Note: after Auguste Léopold Protet (1808–1862)) 1962–1992
  - Enseigne de Vaisseau Henry (F749) 1963–1996

=== Coastal Escorts – Escorteurs côtiers ===
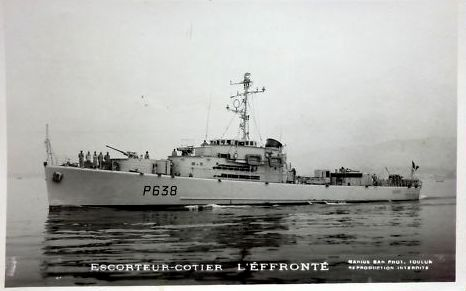
L'Effronté

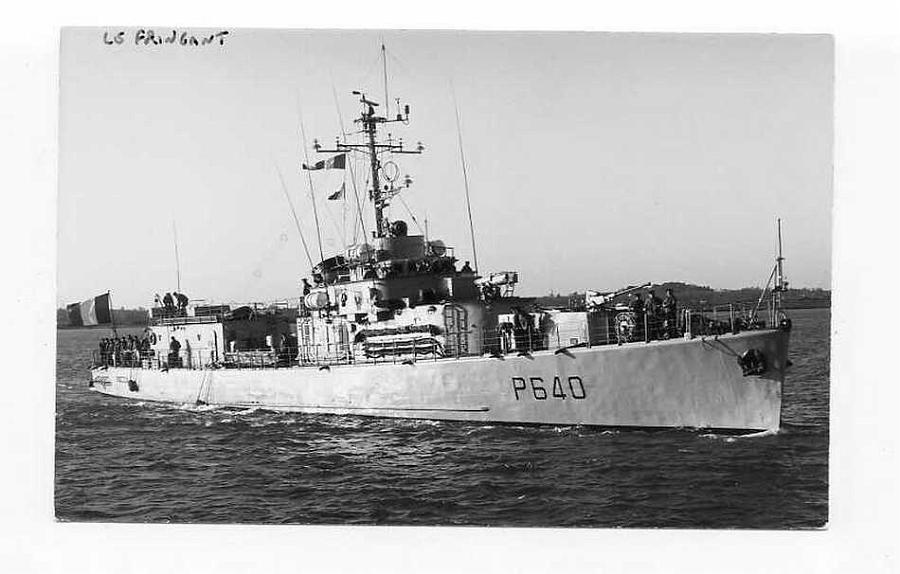
Le Fringant

- Le Fougueux class
  - Le Fougueux (P641) 1954–1975
  - L'Opiniâtre (P642) 1954–1975
  - L'Agile (P643) 1954–1976
- L'Adroit class :
  - L'Adroit (P644) 1957–1979
  - L'Alerte (P645) 1957–1979
  - L'Attentif (P646) 1957–1978
  - L'Intrépide (P630) 1958–1976
  - L'Ardent (P635) 1958–1979
  - L'Etourdi (P637) 1958–1976
  - L'Enjoué (P647) 1958–
  - Le Hardi (P648) 1958–1977
  - L'Effronté (P638) 1959–
  - Le Frondeur (P639) 1959–1977
  - Le Fringant (P640) 1959–1982

== See also ==
- List of active French Navy ships
- Fusiliers Marins
