= K57 =

K57 or K-57 may refer to:

- K-57 (Kansas highway)
- French corvette Roselys (K57), previously HMS Sundew (K57) when with the Royal Navy
- Potassium-57, an isotope of potassium
