= K195 =

K195 or K-195 may refer to:

- K-195 (Kansas highway), a state highway in Kansas
- Litanies (Mozart)
- K195, a ship of the Free French Naval Forces
