= Oise (disambiguation) =

Oise is a department in the north of France.

Oise may also refer to:

- Oise (river), a river flowing through Belgium and France
- Canal latéral à l'Oise, a canal parallel to the Oise (river)
- Val-d'Oise, a department of France located in the Île-de-France region
- FS Oise, a ship, frigate of the French Navy of the Fifth Republic
- Oise stone, a type of limestone used for construction
- Bourdon de l'Oise (1758–1798), a French politician

OISE, as a four-letter acronym, may refer to:

- Ontario Institute for Studies in Education, an educational institute in Canada

== See also ==
- Ronde de l'Oise, a cycling race
- Seine–Oise–Marne culture, a prehistoric Chalcolithic culture found in France
- Grand Paris Seine et Oise, France; a conurbation
- Seine-et-Oise, a former department of France
- Sambre–Oise Canal, France
- Oise-Somme Canal, France
