= Le Normand-class frigate =

Class of fast frigates in the French Navy (in commission 1956-85)

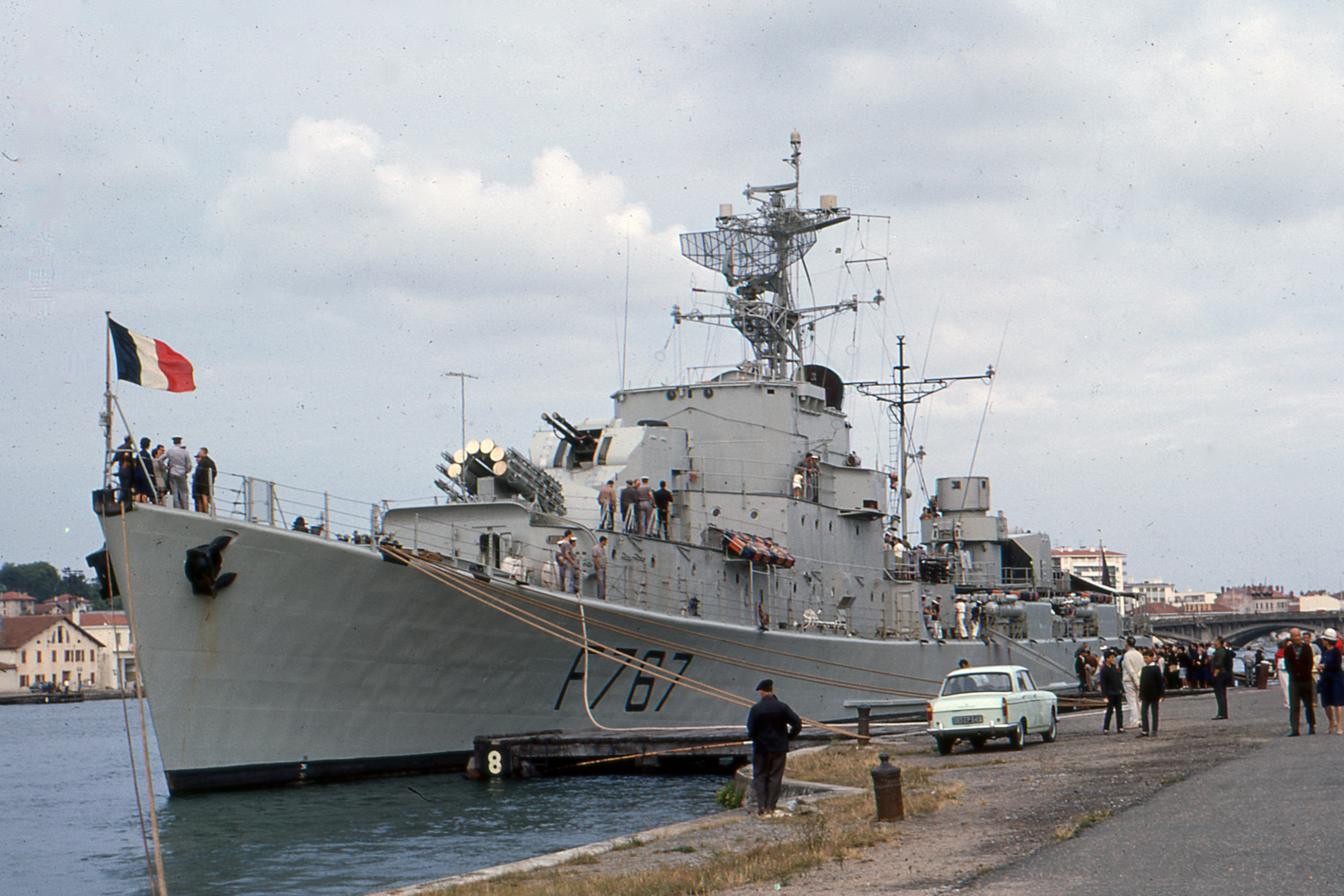
- Le Gascon (1965)

Class overview
- Name: Le Normand class
- Builders: Forges et Chantiers de la Méditerrané; Ateliers et Chantiers de la Loire; Arsenal de Lorient; Ateliers et Chantiers de Penhoët
- Operators: French Navy
- Preceded by: Le Corse class
- Succeeded by: Commandant Rivière class
- Built: 1956–1960
- In commission: 1956–1985
- Completed: 14
- Retired: 14

General characteristics
- Type: Frigate
- Displacement: 1295 ton standard, 1795 ton full load
- Length: 99.3 m (325 ft 9 in) overall
- Beam: 10.3 m (33 ft 10 in)
- Draught: 4.1 m (13 ft 5 in)
- Propulsion: 2 shaft Parsons or Le Rateau geared turbines, 2 boilers, 14,914 kW (20,000 hp)
- Speed: 28 knots (52 km/h; 32 mph)
- Range: 4,500 nmi (8,300 km; 5,200 mi)
- Complement: 175 peace, 200 war
- Sensors & processing systems: DRBV 22, DRBC 31 radar, DUBV 1, DUBA 1 sonar
- Armament: 6 × 57mm/60 modèle 1951 guns (3 × 2); 2 × 20 mm (2 × 1); 12 × 550 mm (22 in) torpedo-tubes (4 × 3); 6 × 375 mm ASW rocket launchers (1 × 6); 2 × depth charge launcher, 1 × depth charge rack

The Le Normand class (or E52 Type) was a class of 14 fast frigates (Escorteurs Rapide) built for the French Navy in the late 1950s. They were an immediate follow-on from the earlier Le Corse-class (or E50 type) frigates, and like them, were long-range convoy escorts capable of high speed. The first seven ships, paid for by the United States under the Mutual Defense Assistance Act were ordered in 1952. The remaining seven ships were paid for by France and ordered between 1953 and 1955.

== Design ==
The E52 type shared a flush-decked layout with the E50 class, and had a similar armament of three twin 57 mm turrets) (one forward and two aft) and an anti-submarine armament consisting of a battery of heavyweight guided torpedoes and a 375 mm Bofors six-barrel rocket launcher. The major difference was the layout of the armament, with the torpedo tubes moving from forwards to amidships, and the Bofors launcher moving from amidships to forward of the bow gun, thus reducing topweight and improving the arc of fire for the Bofors launcher.

The last three ships were completed as a modified version, the Type E52B. This replaced the amidships turret and the Bofors rocket launcher with a new 305 mm anti-submarine mortar mounted amidships. Two more of this type were ordered in 1957, but were cancelled owing to financial problems.

== Ships ==
Pennant	Name	Builder	Laid down	Launched	Commissioned	Fate
F 765	Le Normand	F C de la Méditerrané	July 1953	13 February 1954	3 November 1956	Stricken 1980
F 766	Le Picard	A C de la Loire	November 1953	31 May 1954	20 September 1956	Stricken 1979
F 767	Le Gascon	A C de la Loire	February 1954	23 October 1954	29 March 1957	Stricken 1977
F 768	Le Lorrain	F C de la Méditerranée	February 1954	19 June 1954	1 January 1957	Broken Up 1981
F 769	Le Bourguignon	Ateliers et Chantiers de Penhoët	January 1954	28 January 1956	11 July 1957	Stricken 1976
F 770	Le Champenois	A C de la Loire	May 1954	12 March 1955	1 June 1957	Stricken 1975
F 771	Le Savoyard	F C de la Méditerranée	November 1953	7 May 1955	14 June 1956	Stricken 1980
F 772	Le Breton	Arsenal de Lorient	June 1954	2 April 1955	20 August 1957	Stricken 1977
F 773	Le Basque	Arsenal de Lorient	December 1954	25 February 1956	18 October 1957	Stricken 1980
F 774	L'Agenais	Arsenal de Lorient	August 1955	23 June 1956	14 May 1958	Stricken 1985
F 775	Le Bearnais	Arsenal de Lorient	December 1955	23 June 1956	14 October 1958	Stricken 1980
F 776	L'Alsacien	Arsenal de Lorient	July 1956	26 January 1957	27 August 1960	Stricken 1981
F 777	Le Provençal	Arsenal de Lorient	February 1957	5 October 1957	6 November 1960	Stricken 1980
F 778	Le Vendeen	F C de la Méditerranée	March 1957	27 July 1957	1 October 1960	Stricken 1981

== See also ==
- List of Escorteurs of the French Navy
