= French frigate Tunisien =

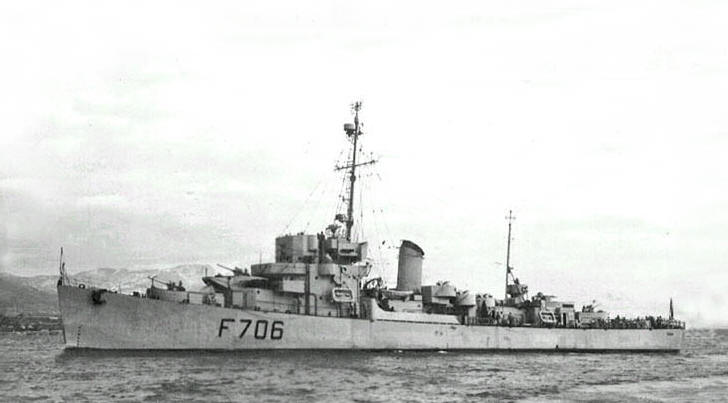

History

United States
- Name: USS Crosley
- Namesake: Walter Selywn Crosley
- Builder: Dravo Corporation, Wilmington, Delaware
- Laid down: 23 June 1943
- Launched: 17 December 1943
- Commissioned: 10 February 1944
- Identification: DE-108
- Fate: Transferred to Free France, 11 February 1944
- Stricken: 14 May 1952

Free France
- Name: Tunisien
- Namesake: Tunisian
- Acquired: 12 February 1944
- Identification: T23

France
- Name: Tunisien (T23)
- Namesake: Tunisian
- Acquired: 14 October 1945
- Reclassified: Tunisien (F06); Tunisien (F706)
- Fate: Returned to the US Navy in May 1964

General characteristics
- Class & type: Cannon-class destroyer escort
- Displacement: 1,240 long tons (1,260 t) standard; 1,620 long tons (1,646 t) full
- Length: 306 ft (93 m) o/a; 300 ft (91 m) w/l
- Beam: 36 ft 10 in (11.23 m)
- Draft: 8 ft 9 in (2.67 m)
- Propulsion: 4 × GM Mod. 16-278A diesel engines with electric drive, 6,000 shp (4,474 kW), 2 screws
- Speed: 21 knots (39 km/h; 24 mph)
- Range: 10,800 nmi (20,000 km) at 12 kn (22 km/h; 14 mph)
- Complement: 15 officers and 201 enlisted
- Armament: 3 × single Mk.22 3"/50 caliber guns; 1 × twin 40 mm Mk.1 AA gun; 8 × 20 mm Mk.4 AA guns; 3 × 21 in (533 mm) torpedo tubes; 1 × Hedgehog Mk.10 anti-submarine mortar; 8 × Mk.6 depth charge projectors; 2 × Mk.9 depth charge tracks

Tunisien (T23, F706), was a Cannon-class destroyer escort in service with the Free French Naval Forces and the French Navy from 1944 to 1964. She was scrapped in 1964.

== History ==
=== World War II ===
The ship was originally built as USS Crosley (DE-108), an American named for Rear Admiral Walter Selywn Crosley. Crosley was transferred to the Free French Naval Forces under lend lease on 12 February 1944, and renamed Tunisien (T23).

Tunisien participated in Operation Anvil-Dragoon on 15 August 1944.

Ownership of the vessel was transferred to France on 21 April 1952 under the Mutual Defense Assistance Program.

=== Algerian War ===
Tunisien participated in the Algerian War in 1956. She was decommissioned and returned to the U.S. Navy in 1964 and scrapped.

== See also ==
- List of escorteurs of the French Navy
