= French frigate Somali =

Frigate

History

United States
- Name: USS Somali (DE-111)
- Builder: Dravo Corporation, Wilmington, Delaware
- Laid down: 23 October 1943
- Launched: 12 February 1944
- Fate: Transferred to Free France, 9 April 1944
- Stricken: 14 May 1952

History

Free France
- Name: FFL Somali (T-53)
- Namesake: Somali
- Acquired: 9 April 1944

History

France
- Name: Somali (T-23)
- Acquired: 14 October 1946
- Renamed: Arago (A-607), for Jacques Arago, 1968
- Reclassified: Somali (F03) 1948; Somali (F703) 1951; Somali (A607) 1956
- Fate: 31 August 1972 Returned to the United States of America

General characteristics
- Class & type: Cannon-class destroyer escort
- Displacement: 1,240 long tons (1,260 t) standard; 1,620 long tons (1,646 t) full
- Length: 306 ft (93 m) o/a; 300 ft (91 m) w/l
- Beam: 36 ft 10 in (11.23 m)
- Draft: 8 ft 9 in (2.67 m)
- Propulsion: 4 × GM Mod. 16-278A diesel engines with electric drive, 6,000 shp (4,474 kW), 2 screws
- Speed: 21 knots (39 km/h; 24 mph)
- Range: 10,800 nmi (20,000 km) at 12 kn (22 km/h; 14 mph)
- Complement: 15 officers and 201 enlisted
- Armament: 3 × single Mk.22 3"/50 caliber guns; 1 × twin 40 mm Mk.1 AA gun; 8 × 20 mm Mk.4 AA guns; 3 × 21-inch (533 mm) torpedo tubes; 1 × Hedgehog Mk.10 anti-submarine mortar; 8 × Mk.6 depth charge projectors; 2 × Mk.9 depth charge tracks

Somali, was a frigate in the Free French Naval Forces during World War II and the French Navy post-war. The ship was originally built as USS Somali (DE-111), an American Cannon-class destroyer escort.

== History ==
=== World War II ===
During World War II, Somali was transferred to the Free French Naval Forces under lend lease on 9 April 1944, and retained the name Somali. Ownership of the vessel was transferred to France on 21 April 1952 under the Mutual Defense Assistance Program.

Somali would join TG 80.6 in Operation Anvil-Dragoon in August 1944.

=== First Indochina War ===
In August 1945, Somali arrived in French Indochina to help in the area. Somali was stationed in Saigon and was sent to Nhabe, Soirap, Vaico and Bing Trung. On 25 January 1946, Somali participated in Operation Gaur.

=== Post War ===
In 1956 Somali was disarmed and used as an experimental ship with the hull number changed to A607. On 1 January 1968 Somali was renamed Arago. and on 31 August 1972 returned to U.S. custody and was scrapped

== See also ==
- List of escorteurs of the French Navy
