= French frigate Marocain =

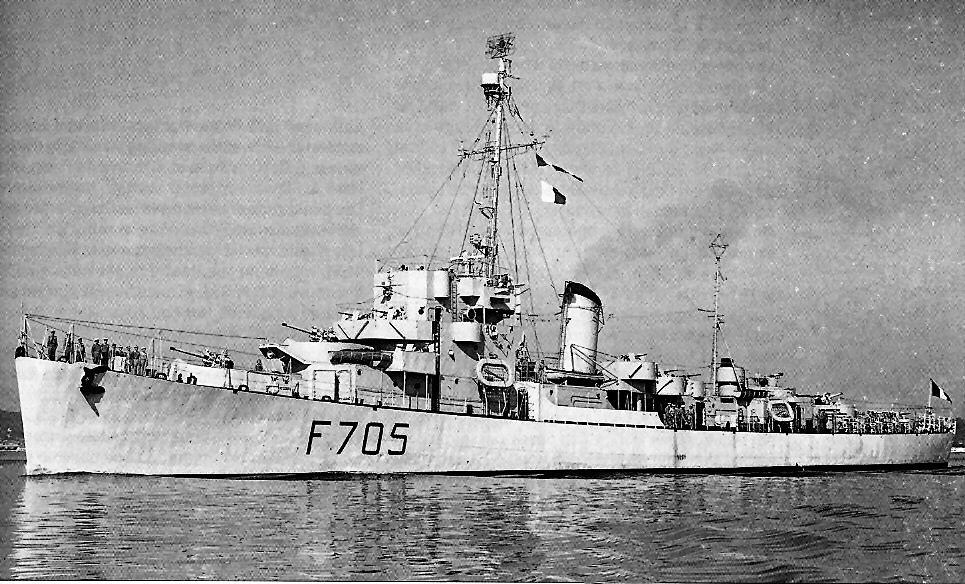
- Port side view of Free French Destroyer Escort Marocain (F-705).

History

United States
- Name: USS Marocain (DE-109)
- Builder: Dravo Corporation, Wilmington, Delaware
- Laid down: 7 September 1943
- Launched: 1 January 1944
- Commissioned: 29 February 1944
- Fate: Transferred to Free France, 29 February 1944
- Stricken: 14 May 1952

History

Free France
- Name: Marocain (F-705)
- Namesake: Moroccan
- Acquired: 29 February 1944

History

France
- Name: Marocain (F-705)
- Acquired: 14 October 1946
- Stricken: 1960
- Fate: Returned to USN May 1964

General characteristics
- Class & type: Cannon-class destroyer escort
- Displacement: 1,240 long tons (1,260 t) standard; 1,620 long tons (1,646 t) full
- Length: 306 ft (93 m) o/a; 300 ft (91 m) w/l
- Beam: 36 ft 10 in (11.23 m)
- Draft: 8 ft 9 in (2.67 m)
- Propulsion: 4 × GM Mod. 16-278A diesel engines with electric drive, 6,000 shp (4,474 kW), 2 screws
- Speed: 21 knots (39 km/h; 24 mph)
- Range: 10,800 nmi (20,000 km) at 12 kn (22 km/h; 14 mph)
- Complement: 15 officers and 201 enlisted
- Armament: 3 × single Mk.22 3"/50 caliber guns; 1 × twin 40 mm Mk.1 AA gun; 8 × 20 mm Mk.4 AA guns; 3 × 21-inch (533 mm) torpedo tubes; 1 × Hedgehog Mk.10 anti-submarine mortar; 8 × Mk.6 depth charge projectors; 2 × Mk.9 depth charge tracks

Marocain, was a frigate in the Free French Naval Forces during World War II and the French Navy post-war. The ship was originally built as USS Marocain (DE-109), an American Cannon-class destroyer escort.

== History ==
=== World War II ===
During World War II, Marocain was transferred to the Free French Naval Forces under lend lease on 29 February 1944, and retained the name Marocain.

Marocain participated in Operation Anvil-Dragoon on 15 August 1944.

Ownership of the vessel was transferred to France on 21 April 1952 under the Mutual Defense Assistance Program. In May 1964 she was struck from the French Navy and broken up for scrap.

== See also ==
- List of escorteurs of the French Navy
