= USS Cronin =

Buckley-class destroyer escort

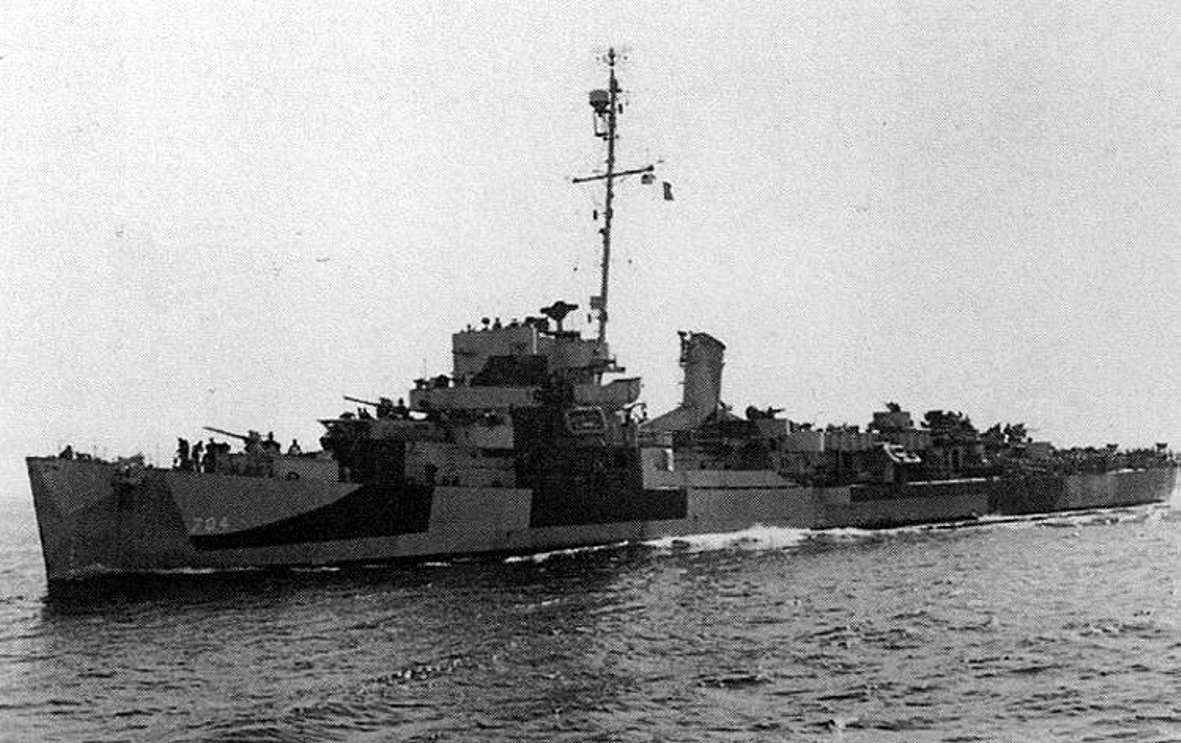

History

United States
- Ordered: 1942
- Builder: Defoe Shipbuilding Company
- Laid down: 19 October 1943
- Launched: 5 January 1944
- Commissioned: 5 May 1944
- Recommissioned: 9 February 1951
- Decommissioned: 4 December 1953
- Reclassified: 13 September 1950 from DE-704 to DEC-704; 27 December 1957 from DEC-704 to DE-704
- Stricken: 1 June 1970
- Fate: Sunk as target, 16 December 1971

General characteristics
- Class & type: Buckley-class destroyer escort
- Displacement: 1400 tons standard 1740 tons full load
- Length: 306 ft (93 m)
- Beam: 37 ft (11 m)
- Draft: 9.5 ft (2.9 m) standard, 11.25 ft (3.43 m) full load
- Propulsion: 2 boilers, General Electric Turbo-electric drive 2 solid manganese-bronze 3600 lb 3-bladed propellers, 8.5 ft (2.6 m) diameter, 7 ft 7 in (2.31 m) pitch 12,000 hp (8.9 MW) 2 rudders
- Speed: 23 knots (43 km/h)
- Range: 359 tons oil 3,700 nautical miles (6,900 km) at 15 knots (28 km/h) 6,000 nautical miles (11,000 km) at 12 knots (22 km/h)
- Complement: 15 officers, 198 men
- Armament: 3 x 3 in (76 mm) cal. guns (76.2 mm) 4 x 1.1"/75 caliber gun Anti-Aircraft guns (1x4) 8 x 20 mm 3 x 21 inch (533 mm) torpedo tubes (1x3) 1 x hedgehog projector 8 x depth charge projectors (K-guns) 2 x depth charge tracks

USS Cronin (DE/DEC-704) was a Buckley-class destroyer escort in service with the United States Navy from 1944 to 1946 and from 1951 to 1953. She was sunk as a target in 1971.

== History ==
Cronin was the second U.S. Navy ship named for Chief Gunner Cornelius Cronin (1838–1912), who was awarded the Medal of Honor for his "coolness and close attention to duty" in the Battle of Mobile Bay.

Cronin was launched on 5 January 1944 at the Defoe Shipbuilding Company in Bay City, Michigan, sponsored by Mrs. E. B. Cronin, daughter-in-law of the late Chief Gunner Cronin. She was commissioned on 5 May 1944.

=== World War II ===
Cronin departed New York on 21 July to escort a convoy to Bizerte, Tunisia, returning to Norfolk, Virginia on 7 September. A second convoy escort voyage from 2 October to 18 November during which she rescued 24 survivors from SS George W. McKnight on 14 October took her to Palermo, Sicily. On 16 December, she departed New York for the Pacific, arriving at Manus Island on 22 January 1945.

Assigned to the Philippine Sea Frontier, Cronin operated out of Leyte on convoy escort duty until the end of World War II. On 30 August, she departed Manila for Okinawa. From this base, she supported the re-occupation of mainland China, escorted transports to Jinsen, Korea, screened the escort carrier Bougainville (CVE-100) which was delivering planes at Taku and Tsingtao, and escorted an LST convoy to Jinsen. She departed Okinawa on 8 November for Boston, Massachusetts, arriving there on 15 December. Cronin arrived at Green Cove Springs, Florida, on 19 January 1946, and was placed out of commission in reserve there on 31 May 1946. She was reclassified DEC-704, on 13 September 1950.

=== Cold War ===
Recommissioned on 9 February 1951, Cronin took part in major exercises in the Atlantic, and operated out of Norfolk on training duty that included exercises at Key West with submarines in March 1953. Cronin returned to Green Cove Springs on 24 September 1953

=== Decommissioning and fate ===
Cronin was again placed out of commission in reserve on 4 December 1953. She was reclassified back to DE-704 on 27 December 1957. On 16 December 1971, Cronin was towed out to sea and sunk as an aircraft target. Her final resting place is listed at 31° 43' N., 76° 15' W.

== Awards ==
Cronin was awarded the American Campaign Medal, Asiatic-Pacific Campaign Medal, and European-African-Middle Eastern Campaign Medals for her World War II service. She also received the Navy Occupation Service Medal and the China Service Medal for her operations in the Far East following the close of the war.
