= Émile Muselier =

Free French Naval Forces admiral (1882–1965)

Émile Henry Muselier
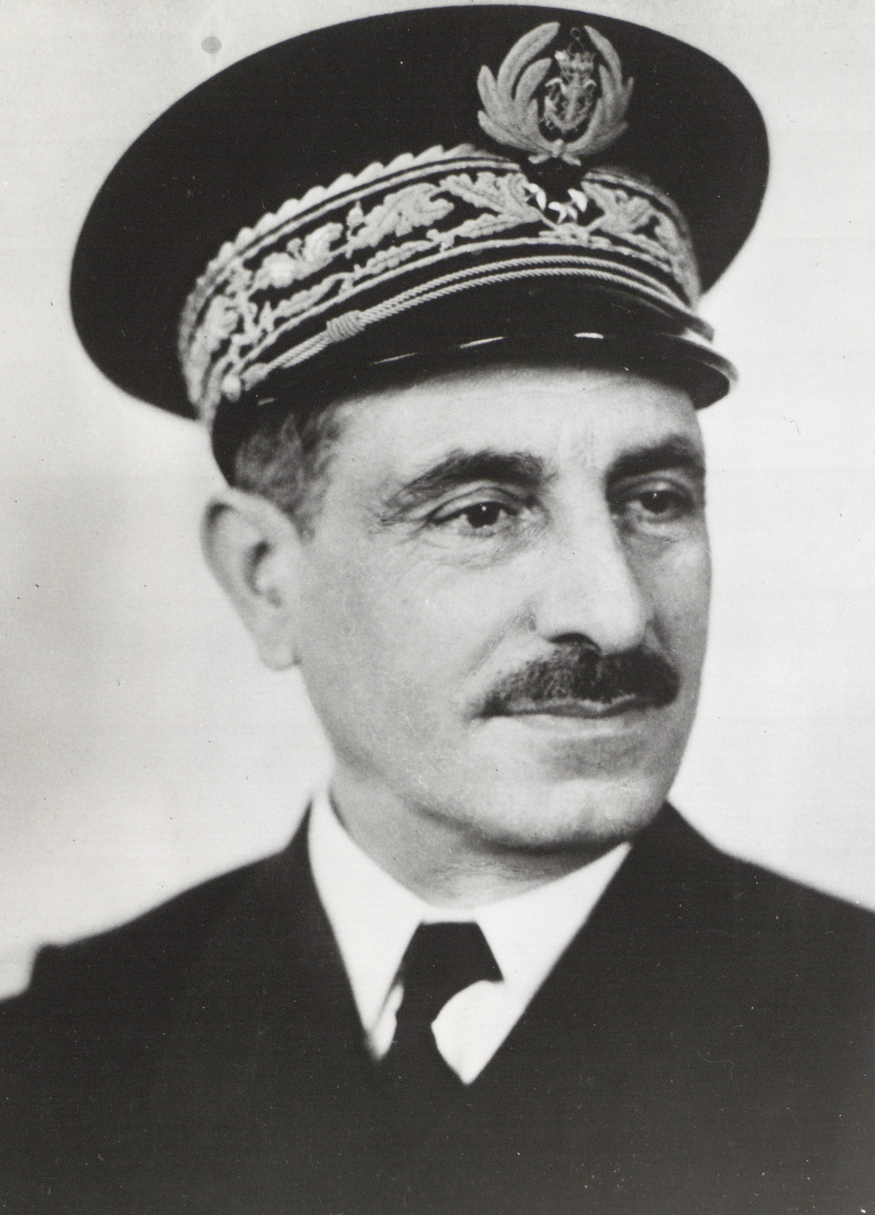
- Born: 17 April 1882; Marseille, France
- Died: 2 September 1965 (aged 83); Toulon, France
- Military career
- Allegiance: France; Free French Forces
- Branch: Free French Naval Forces
- Rank: Admiral
- Conflicts: World War I World War II
- Awards: Grand Officier of the Légion d'Honneur; Compagnon de la Libération; Croix de Guerre

Émile Henry Muselier (French pronunciation: [emil ɑ̃ʁi myzəlje]; 17 April 1882 – 2 September 1965) was a French admiral who led the Free French Naval Forces (Forces navales françaises libres, or FNFL) during World War II. He was responsible for the idea of distinguishing his fleet from that of Vichy France by adopting the Cross of Lorraine, which later became the emblem of all of the Free French. After entering the French Naval Academy (École Navale) in 1899, he embarked on a brilliant and eventful military career. He ran unsuccessfully in the legislative elections of 1946 as vice-president of the Rally of Republican Lefts (Rassemblement des gauches républicaines) and then entered private life as a consulting engineer before his retirement in 1960. He is buried in the cemetery of St. Pierre, at Marseille.

== Early career ==
Muselier's career started with a campaign in the Far East, several others in the Adriatic, one in Albania, which overlapped with a stay in Toulon. During World War I he also fought at the Yser in Belgium as the head of a troop of marine fusiliers.

Muselier received his first real command, of the aviso Scape, in April 1918. For his service in World War I, Muselier was awarded the Navy Cross.

This was followed by the command of the destroyer Ouragan in 1925, that of armoured cruiser Ernest Renan in 1927, then battleship Voltaire in 1930, and Bretagne in 1931.

In 1933, Muselier, by then promoted to rear-admiral, became Major-General of the port of Sidi-Abdalah in Tunisia, where he wrote social commentaries such as "La Mie de Pain" ("the breadcrumb"). In 1938, he received command of the Navy and the defence sector of the city of Marseille.

Muselier had previously been attached to the cabinets of Painlevé and Clemenceau, then became chief of staff of the naval delegation to Germany.

On 10 October 1939, Muselier was promoted to vice-admiral by Admiral Darlan, himself a former fellow student of the École Navale. Darlan retracted the promotion as of 21 November, following libelous charges levied against Muselier. A similar incident occurred when Muselier was under the orders of General de Gaulle, whom he had rejoined on 30 June 1940. He was, however, quickly cleared of the suspicions of treason which the British levelled at him on the basis of false documents; this prompted the British Government to apologise.

== Role in Free French ==
On 1 July 1940, General de Gaulle named Muselier commander of the Free French naval forces and, provisionally, commander of the air force; these roles were later confirmed in 1941 with the creation of the Conseil national. The same day, Admiral Muselier wrote his own appeal, addressed to sailors and pilots. He assembled an embryonic General Staff with Ship-of-the-Line Captain (Capitaine de Vaisseau) Thierry d'Argenlieu and a junior officer (Enseigne de vaisseau) named Voisin, before leaving on a mission to Alexandria in order to attempt a coup d'état in Syria.

In 1940, the Vichy government sentenced Muselier to death in absentia and confiscated all of his possessions. In 1941, it forfeited his French citizenship.

On 1 January 1941, Churchill ordered Muselier's arrest on the basis of documents suggesting he was passing secrets to the Vichy regime. After the documents were shown to be forgeries, Churchill was forced to apologize to de Gaulle.

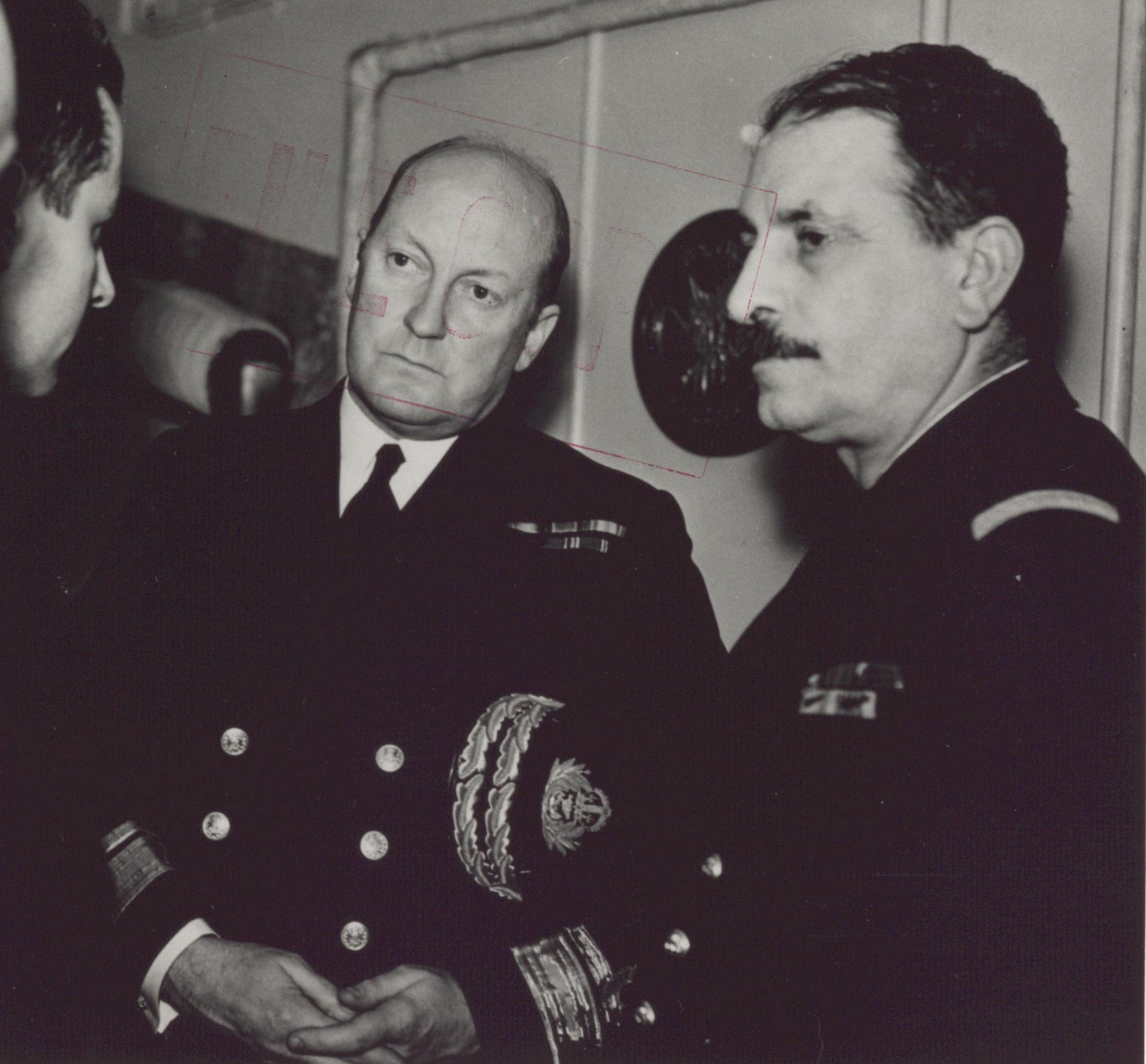
Admirals Murray (Canada) and Muselier (France) c. 1942

While under the overall command of Canadian Admiral Leonard W. Murray, but acting under the orders of General de Gaulle, Muselier led the liberation of Saint-Pierre and Miquelon on 24 December 1941, unloading three French corvettes and the submarine cruiser Surcouf from Halifax and installing the enseigne de vaisseau Alain Savary as Commissaire of Free France, which angered Roosevelt. De Gaulle had initially declined the suggestion of invasion made by Muselier, but had desired to affirm French sovereignty after learning of Canadian and British desires for the archipelago. The incident caused tension in relations with Canada and the UK, and eventually led the admiral to resign from his post of Commissaire.

Not especially loyal to de Gaulle, Muselier was let down two years later, in Algiers, because of serious political divergences. Preferring to work under General Henri Giraud, he served as the temporary civil and military person in charge for Algiers in June 1943 and even appeared to act as the head of an anti-Gaullist putsch, before de Gaulle became head of the French Committee of National Liberation (Comité français de la Libération nationale) on 3 June.

After having been the chief of the naval delegation to the military Mission for German Affairs, he retired from the navy in 1946.
