= French frigate Hova =

1944 Cannon-class destroyer escort

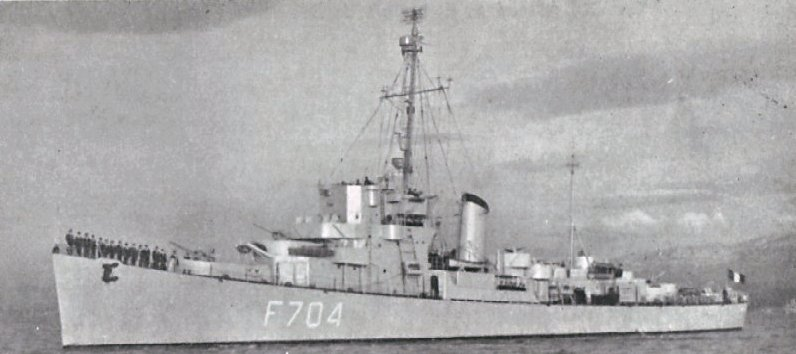
- Port side view of Free French Destroyer Escort Hova(F704).

History

United States
- Name: USS Hova (DE-110)
- Builder: Dravo Corporation, Wilmington, Delaware
- Laid down: 25 September 1943
- Launched: 22 January 1944
- Commissioned: 18 March 1944
- Fate: Transferred to Free France, 18 March 1944
- Stricken: 14 May 1952

History

Free France
- Name: Hova (F-704)
- Namesake: Hova
- Acquired: 18 March 1944

History

France
- Name: Hova (F-704)
- Acquired: 14 October 1946
- Stricken: Returned to the US Navy May 1964
- Fate: Scrapped

General characteristics
- Class & type: Cannon-class destroyer escort
- Displacement: 1,240 long tons (1,260 t) standard; 1,620 long tons (1,646 t) full
- Length: 306 ft (93 m) o/a; 300 ft (91 m) w/l
- Beam: 36 ft 10 in (11.23 m)
- Draft: 8 ft 9 in (2.67 m)
- Propulsion: 4 × GM Mod. 16-278A diesel engines with electric drive, 6,000 shp (4,474 kW), 2 screws
- Speed: 21 knots (39 km/h; 24 mph)
- Range: 10,800 nmi (20,000 km) at 12 kn (22 km/h; 14 mph)
- Complement: 15 officers and 201 enlisted
- Armament: 3 × single Mk.22 3"/50 caliber guns; 1 × twin 40 mm Mk.1 AA gun; 8 × 20 mm Mk.4 AA guns; 3 × 21-inch (533 mm) torpedo tubes; 1 × Hedgehog Mk.10 anti-submarine mortar; 8 × Mk.6 depth charge projectors; 2 × Mk.9 depth charge tracks

Hova was an Escorteur in the Free French Naval Forces during World War II and the French Navy post-war. The ship was originally built as USS Hova (DE-110), an American Cannon-class destroyer escort, and then designated in France as the F704 Escorteur.

== History ==
=== World War II ===
During World War II, Hova was transferred to the Free French Naval Forces under lend lease on 29 February 1944, and retained the name Hova.

Hova participated in Operation Anvil-Dragoon on 15 August 1944 and Operation Vénérable in April 1945.

Ownership of the vessel was transferred to France on 21 April 1952 under the Mutual Defense Assistance Program.

== See also ==
- List of escorteurs of the French Navy
