= French frigate Algérien =

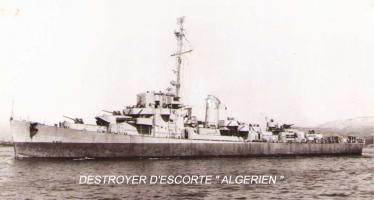
- Port side view of Free French destroyer escort Algérien.

History

United States
- Name: Cronin
- Namesake: Cornelius Cronin
- Builder: Dravo Corporation, Wilmington, Delaware
- Laid down: 13 May 1943
- Launched: 27 November 1943
- Fate: Transferred to France, 23 January 1944
- Stricken: 14 May 1952

Free France
- Name: Algérien
- Namesake: Algerian people
- Acquired: 23 January 1944
- Reclassified: F701

France
- Name: Algérien
- Acquired: 14 October 1946
- Decommissioned: Returned to US Navy May 1964
- Renamed: Oise, for Oise, August 1962
- Reclassified: F701
- Stricken: May 1965
- Fate: Sold for scrapping, November 1965

General characteristics
- Class & type: Cannon-class destroyer escort
- Displacement: 1,240 long tons (1,260 t) standard; 1,620 long tons (1,646 t) full
- Length: 306 ft (93 m) o/a; 300 ft (91 m) w/l
- Beam: 36 ft 10 in (11.23 m)
- Draft: 8 ft 9 in (2.67 m)
- Propulsion: 4 × GM Mod. 16-278A diesel engines with electric drive, 6,000 shp (4,474 kW), 2 screws
- Speed: 21 knots (39 km/h; 24 mph)
- Range: 10,800 nmi (20,000 km) at 12 kn (22 km/h; 14 mph)
- Complement: 15 officers and 201 enlisted
- Armament: 3 × single Mk.22 3"/50 caliber guns; 1 × twin 40 mm Mk.1 AA gun; 8 × 20 mm Mk.4 AA guns; 3 × 21 in (533 mm) torpedo tubes; 1 × Hedgehog Mk.10 anti-submarine mortar; 8 × Mk.6 depth charge projectors; 2 × Mk.9 depth charge tracks

Algérien was a Cannon-class destroyer escort originally named USS Cronin (DE-107) after Cornelius Cronin, a sailor who was awarded the Medal of Honor during the American Civil War. She was transferred to the Free French Naval Forces in 1944 and became part of the French Navy post-war. She was rated as a frigate in French service. She was renamed Oise in 1962 and scrapped in 1965.

== History ==
=== World War II ===
During World War II, Cronin was transferred to the Free French Naval Forces under lend lease on 23 January 1944, and renamed Algérien.

Algérien participated in Operation Anvil-Dragoon on 15 August 1944.

Ownership of the vessel was transferred to France on 21 April 1952 under the Mutual Defense Assistance Program. She was renamed Oise shortly before being transferred back to the US Navy.

== See also ==
- List of escorteurs of the French Navy
