= Cornelius Cronin =

United States Navy Medal of Honor recipient

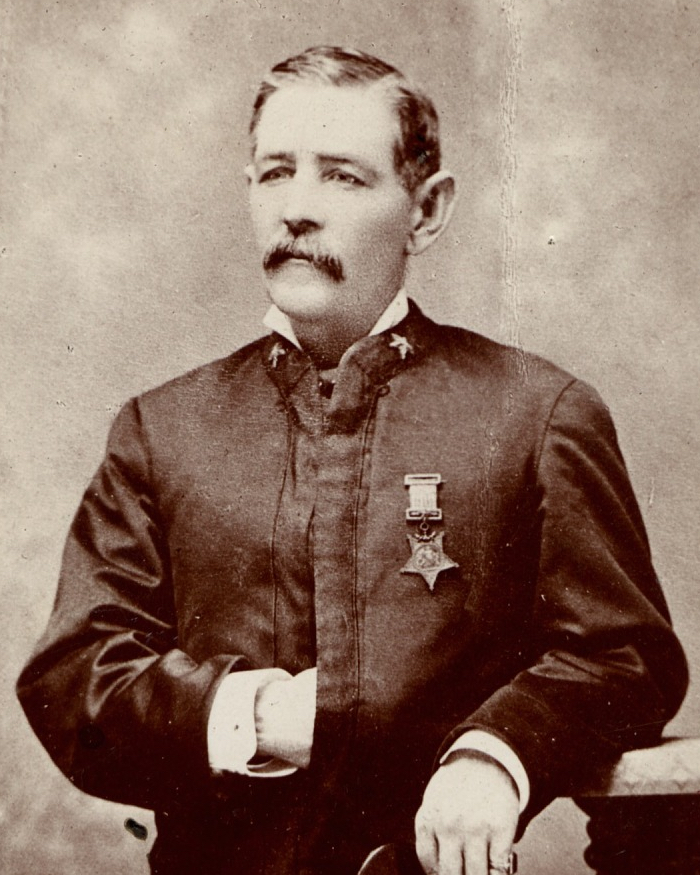
- Chief Quartermaster Cornelius Cronin
- Born: March 10, 1838; Detroit, Michigan
- Died: August 18, 1912 (aged 74); Brooklyn, New York
- Burial place: Calvary Cemetery (Queens, New York)
- Military career
- Allegiance: United States of America; Union
- Branch: United States Navy
- Service years: 1858 – 1908
- Rank: Chief Gunner
- Units: USS Richmond (1860); USS Michigan (1843); USS Vermont (BB-20); USS Columbia (C-12); New York Navy Yard
- Conflicts: American Civil War; *Battle of Mobile Bay
- Awards: Medal of Honor

Cornelius Cronin (March 10, 1838 – August 18, 1912) was a sailor in the United States Navy who received the Medal of Honor for his actions during the American Civil War.

== Biography ==
Cornelius Cronin was born in Detroit, Michigan. He enlisted in the Navy on September 17, 1858. He received the Medal of Honor while serving on the USS Richmond (1860) for his "coolness and close attention to duty in looking out for signals and steering the ship in the action in Mobile Bay on the morning and forenoon of August 5, 1864".

Appointed mate of the USS Michigan (1843) on July 9, 1866, Cronin was warranted acting gunner on November 12, 1875, was transferred to the Retired List August 16, 1898, and continued to serve on board the USS Vermont (BB-20) and the USS Columbia (C-12), and at the New York Navy Yard until February 3, 1908. Chief Gunner Cronin died on August 18, 1912, at Brooklyn, New York.

Cronin was a companion of the Naval Order of the United States.

== Medal of Honor citation ==
Rank and organization: Chief Quartermaster, U.S. Navy. Born: 1836, Michigan. Accredited to: Michigan. G.O. No.: 45, 31 December 1864.

Citation:

On board the U.S.S. Richmond in action at Mobile Bay on 5 August 1864. Cool and vigilant at his station throughout the prolonged action, Cronin watched for signals and skillfully steered the ship as she trained her guns on Fort Morgan and on ships of the Confederacy despite extremely heavy return fire. He participated in the actions at Forts Jackson and St. Philip, with the Chalmette batteries, at the surrender of New Orleans, and in the attacks on batteries below Vicksburg.

== Namesake ==
During World War II, two destroyer escorts were named USS Cronin in his honor.

== See also ==
- List of American Civil War Medal of Honor recipients: A–F
