= Le Corse-class frigate =

Class of 4 fast frigates

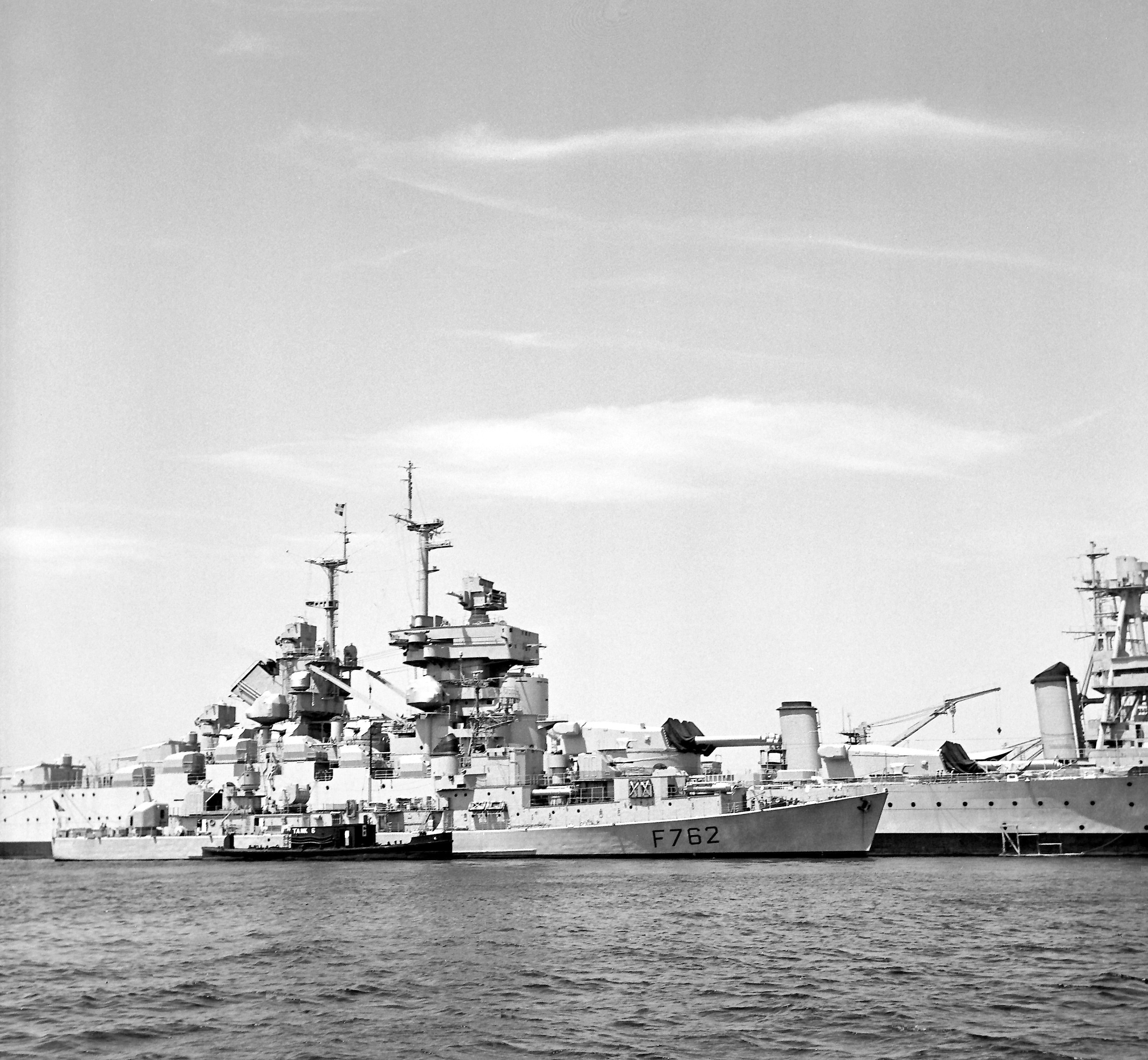
- F762 Le Brestois and battleship Jean Bart

Class overview
- Name: Le Corse class
- Builders: Forges et Chantiers de la Méditerranée; Ateliers et Chantiers de la Loire; Arsenal de Lorient
- Operators: French Navy
- Succeeded by: Le Normand class
- Built: 1952-1953
- In commission: 1955-1976
- Completed: 4
- Retired: 4

General characteristics
- Type: Frigate
- Displacement: 1508 ton standard, 1702 ton full load
- Length: 99.8 m (327 ft) overall
- Beam: 10.3 m (34 ft)
- Draught: 4.3 m (14 ft)
- Propulsion: 2 shaft geared turbines, 2 boilers, 14,914 kW (20,000 hp)
- Speed: 27 knots (50 km/h; 31 mph)
- Range: 4,500 nmi (8,300 km; 5,200 mi)
- Complement: 198 originally, 170 later
- Sensors & processing systems: DRBV 20A, DRBM 32, DRBC 31 radar, ARBR 10, DUBV 1, DUBA 1 sonar
- Armament: 6 × 57mm/60 modèle 1951 guns (3 × 2); 2 × 20 mm Oerlikon (2 × 1); 12 × 550 mm (22 in) torpedo tubes (4 × 3); 6 × Bofors 375 mm ASW rocket launcher (1 × 6); 2 × depth charge launcher, 1 × depth charge rack

The Le Corse class (or E50 Type) was a class of 4 fast frigates (Escorteurs Rapide) built for the French Navy in the early 1950s. They were first surface combatant class of ships to be built after World War II and symbolized "the revival of the French fleet." They were followed by the Le Normand-class (or E52 Type) frigates, and like them, were long-range convoy escorts capable of high speed.

== Design ==
The E50 type shared a flush-decked layout with the E52 class, and had a similar armament of three twin 57mm turrets) (one forward and two aft) and an anti-submarine armament consisting of a battery of heavyweight guided torpedoes and a 375mm Bofors six-barrel rocket launcher.

== Ships ==
Pennant	Name	Builder	Laid down	Launched	Commissioned	Fate
F 761	Le Corse	Arsenal de Lorient	March 1952	8 August 1952	23 April 1955	Target in Atlantic 1975
F 762	Le Brestois	Arsenal de Lorient	August 1952	16 December 1952	19 January 1956	Target in Mediterranean 1976
F 763	Le Boulonnais	Ateliers et Chantiers de la Loire	September 1952	12 May 1953	5 August 1955	Target in Atlantic 1994
F 764	Le Bordelais	Forges et Chantiers de la Méditerranée	January 1953	11 July 1953	7 April 1955	Broken Up at Vigo, Spain 1981

== See also ==
- List of Escorteurs of the French Navy
