= French corvette Roselys =

Flower-class corvette

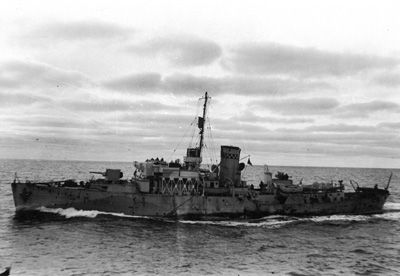

History

United Kingdom
- Name: HMS Sundew
- Ordered: 21 September 1939
- Builder: J. Lewis and Sons Ltd., Aberdeen, Scotland
- Laid down: 4 November 1940
- Launched: 28 May 1941
- Out of service: 17 September 1941 – transferred to Free France
- Identification: Pennant number: K57
- Fate: Scrapped at Troon in May 1948

France
- Name: FFL Roselys
- Acquired: 17 September 1941
- Commissioned: 19 September 1941
- Identification: K-57
- Fate: Returned to Royal Navy in 1947

General characteristics
- Class & type: Flower-class corvette (original)
- Displacement: 925 long tons (940 t; 1,036 short tons)
- Length: 205 ft (62.48 m)o/a
- Beam: 33 ft (10.06 m)
- Draught: 11.5 ft (3.51 m)
- Propulsion: single shaft; 2 × fire tube Scotch boilers; 1 × 4-cycle triple-expansion reciprocating steam engine; 2,750 ihp (2,050 kW)
- Speed: 16 knots (29.6 km/h)
- Range: 3,500 nautical miles (6,482 km) at 12 knots (22.2 km/h)
- Complement: 85
- Sensors & processing systems: 1 × SW1C or 2C radar; 1 × Type 123A or Type 127DV sonar
- Armament: 1 × BL 4-inch (101.6 mm) Mk.IX single gun; 2 x double Lewis machine gun; 2 × twin Vickers machine gun; 2 × Mk.II depth charge throwers; 2 × depth charge rails with 40 depth charges; initially with minesweeper equipment, later removed

Roselys (formerly HMS Sundew) was one of the nine Flower-class corvettes lent by the Royal Navy to the Free French Naval Forces. She served as a naval escort in World War II.

== Construction ==
The vessel was ordered on 21 September 1939. She was constructed in Aberdeen by J. Lewis and Sons Ltd. Her keel was laid on 4 November 1940. The ship was assigned dock number 155. She was launched on 28 May 1941. The vessel was finally commissioned on 19 September 1941.

Other Flower-class ships in Free French service retained their original flower names translated into French. However, the French for sundew, rosée du matin (literally "morning dew"), was considered unsuitable and the girl's name Roselys ("Rose-Lilly") was used instead, perhaps with the intention of linking the English Tudor rose with the French fleur-de-lys.

== War service ==
On 30 January 1942, Roselys spotted a U-boat about 400 yards from her. She turned towards the U-boat with the intention to ram it. The U-boat attempted to dive, but it was lightly rammed before it could submerge. As she passed over the U-boat, depth charges were dropped. The U-boat was probably only lightly damaged, and escaped back to port. She was part of Convoy QP 13, and rescued 179 survivors on 5 July 1942 when several ships ran into naval mines. On 10 March 1943, she picked up 81 survivors from the British merchant Tucurina. Roselys was one of nine Free French escort vessels which supported the Normandy landings on and after 6 June 1944, protecting the movement of landing and supply ships across the English Channel.

== Fate ==
She was returned to the Royal Navy in 1947. She was sold on 23 October 1947, and scrapped at Troon in May 1948.
