= French corvette Alysse =

Flower-class corvette

Alysse
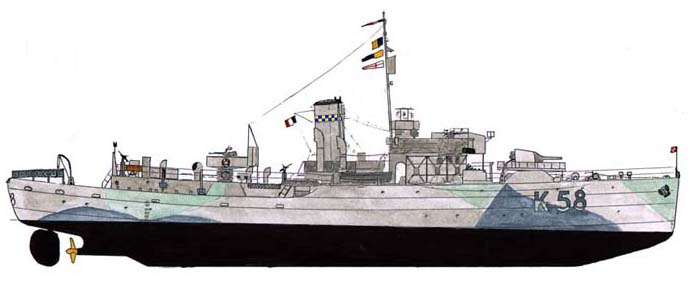
- Flower-class corvette in 1942 paint

History

France
- Name: Alysse
- Ordered: 12 December 1939
- Laid down: 24 June 1940
- Launched: 3 March 1941
- Commissioned: 17 June 1941
- Identification: Pennant number: K100
- Fate: Torpedoed and sunk on 9 February 1942

General characteristics
- Class & type: Flower-class corvette
- Displacement: 950 tonnes
- Length: 62.7 m (205 ft 9 in)
- Beam: 10.9 m (35 ft 9 in)
- Draught: 2.7 m (8 ft 10 in)
- Propulsion: Engine: 4-cylinder triple-expansion steam engine; Fuel: Gazole; Pressure: 225 PSI; Power:2,750 hp (2,050 kW)
- Speed: 16 knots (30 km/h; 18 mph)
- Range: 3,450 nmi (6,390 km; 3,970 mi) at 12 knots (22 km/h; 14 mph); Fuel capacity: 230 tonnes
- Complement: 70
- Sensors & processing systems: Type 271 surface radar
- Armament: 1 BL 4 in (102 mm) Mark IX gun; 1 Mark VIII 40 mm gun; 2 Mark IIA 20 mm guns; 2 Hotchkiss machine guns; 1 Mark III "Hedgehog" mortar (24 shells); 4 Mark I depth charge launchers; 2 ramps for Mark I depth charges; 60 depth charges

Alysse (formerly HMS Alyssum) was one of the nine Flower-class corvettes lent by the Royal Navy to the Free French Naval Forces.

== Construction ==
Alysse was built by George Brown & Co.

== War service ==
Originally built as HMS Alyssum by the British Royal Navy, she was loaned to the Free French Navy upon completion on 17 June 1941.

Convoys escorted by Alysse
Year	Month	Name of convoy
1941	July	convoy England-United States
1941	August	SC 40
1941	September	SC 44
1941	September	ON 19
1941	October	SC 50
1941	November	
1941	December	
1942	January	SC 62
1942	January	ON 60

Shortly after midnight on 9 February 1942 while escorting convoy ON 60, Alysse was torpedoed by the German submarine U-654. The torpedo struck Alysse on the port side in the forward part of the ship causing her to settle by the bow. The surviving crew were rescued by HMCS Hepatica and HMCS Moose Jaw; 36 crew members were lost. Hepatica then attempted to tow Alysse but after 30 minutes the tow parted. A further attempt was made to tow her to port later that day but after 18 hours Alysse foundered and sank at 6°34N/44°10W.

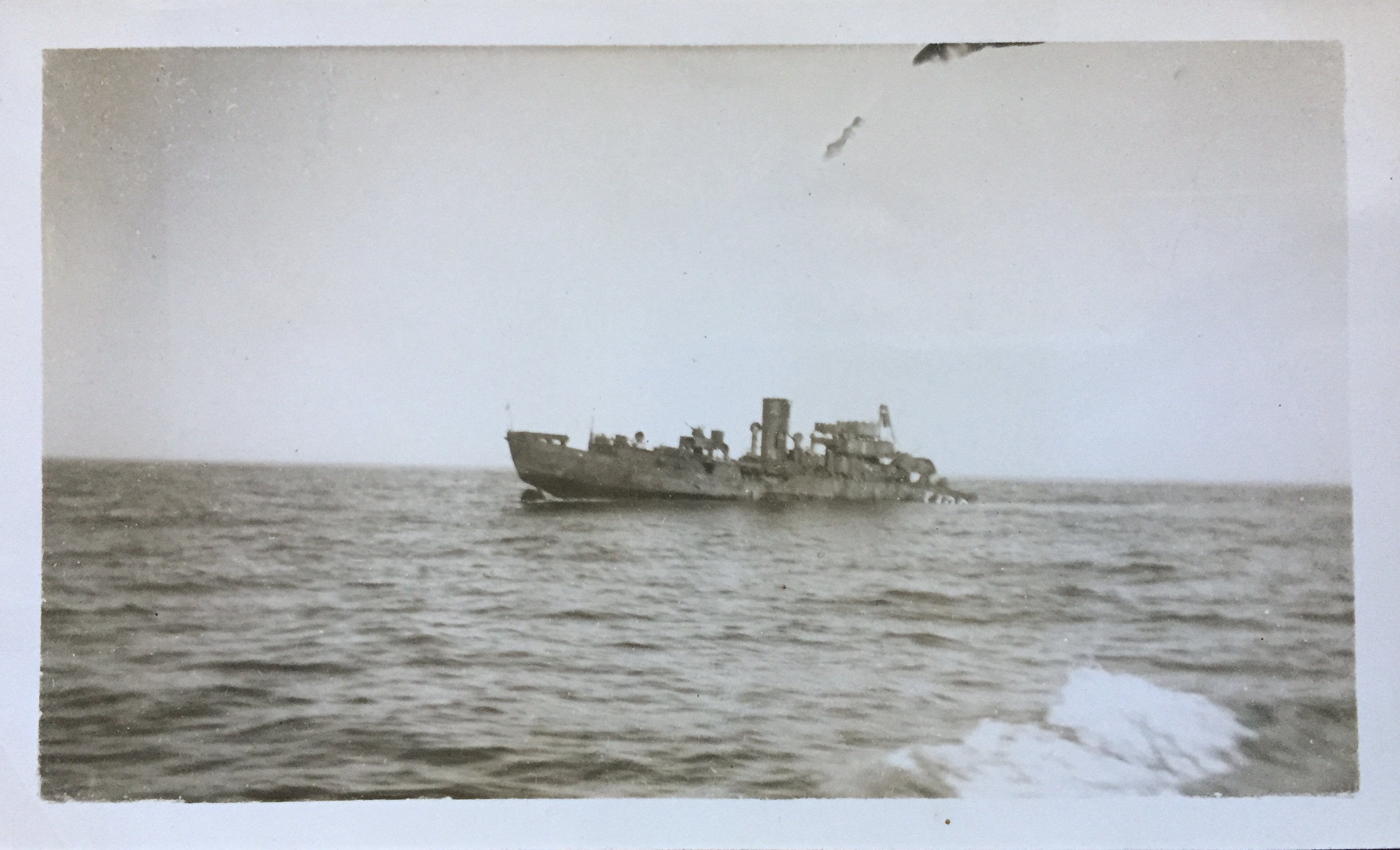
Alysse just prior to sinking, 9 February 1942
