= Free French Naval Forces =

Maritime warfare branch of the Free French Forces

The Free French Naval Forces (French: Forces Navales Françaises Libres, FNFL) were the naval arm of the Free French Forces during the Second World War. They were commanded by Admiral Émile Muselier.

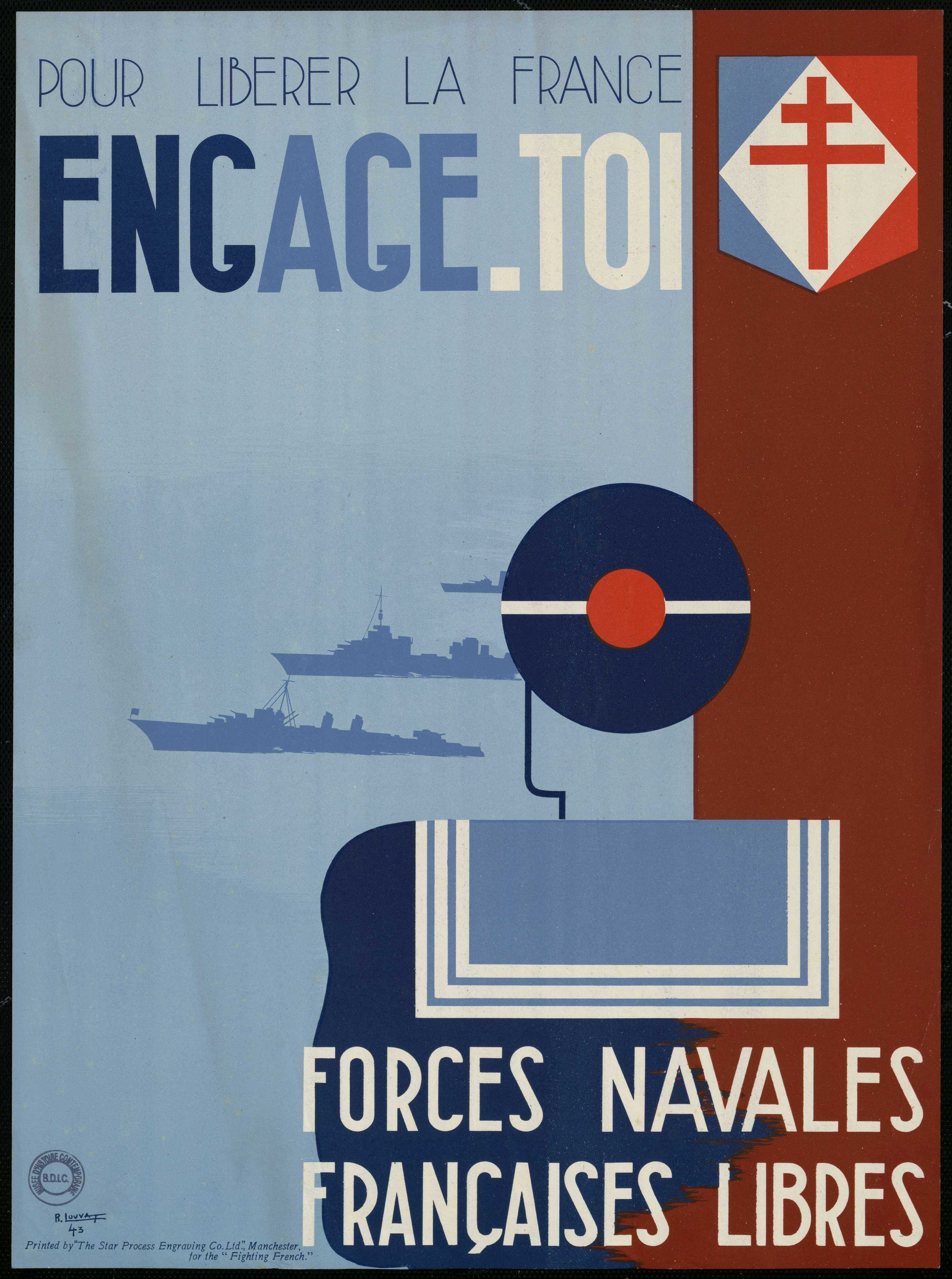
FNFL recruitment poster

== History ==
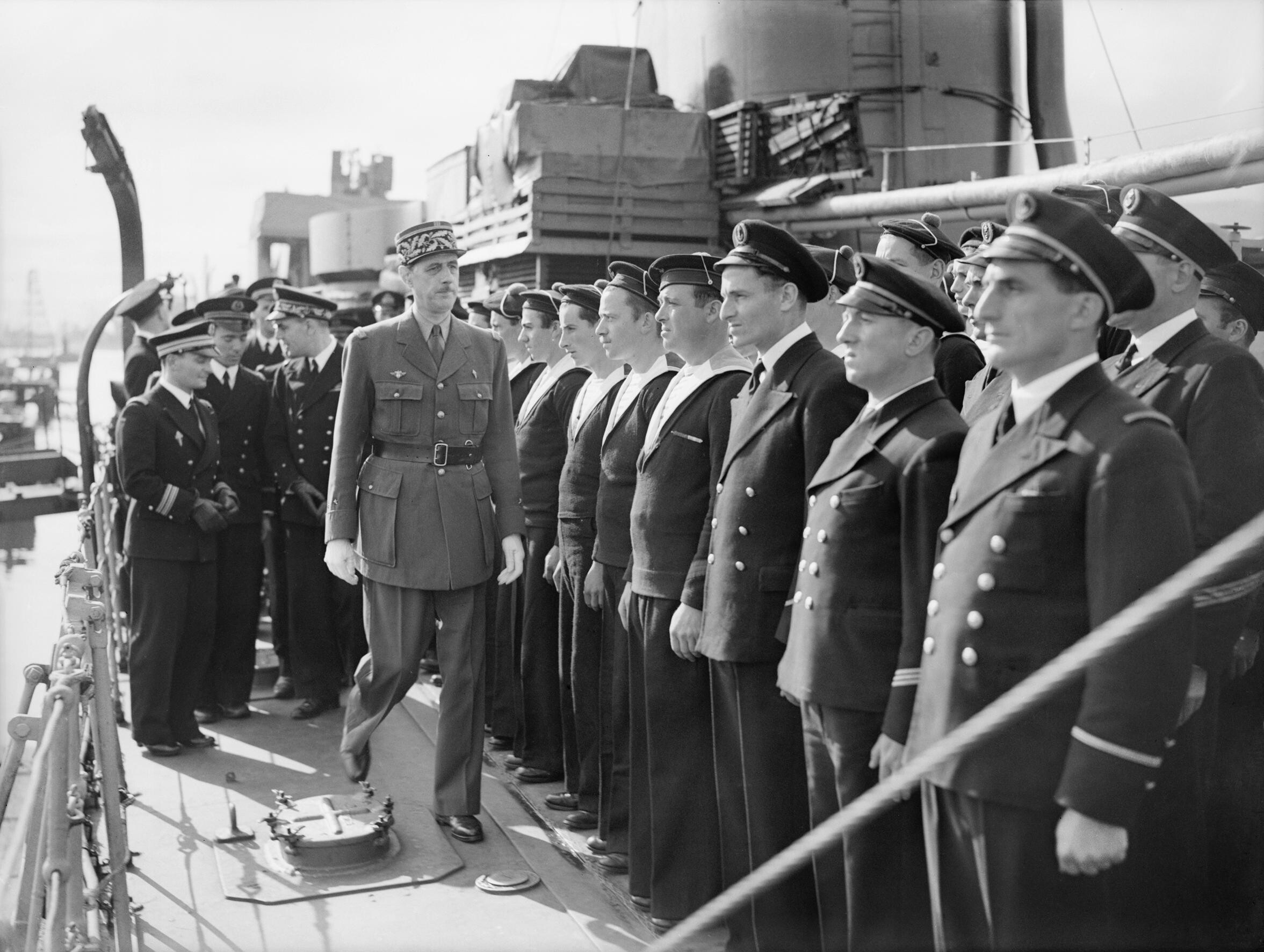
General de Gaulle inspecting sailors on Léopard at Greenock in June 1942

In the wake of the Armistice and the Appeal of 18 June, Charles de Gaulle founded the Free French Forces (Forces Françaises Libres, or FFL), including a naval arm, the "Free French Naval Forces" (Les Forces Navales Françaises Libres, or FNFL). On 24 June 1940, de Gaulle made a separate broadcast specifically to French servicemen overseas, calling for them to join him; two days later the submarine Narval entered Malta and its crew pledged their allegiance to the FFL. On 30 June, de Gaulle was joined by Vice-Admiral Émile Muselier, who had come from Gibraltar by flying boat. Muselier was the only flag officer of the French Navy to answer the call of de Gaulle.

The French fleet was widely dispersed. Some vessels were in port in France; others had escaped from France to British controlled ports, mainly in Britain itself or Alexandria in Egypt. As part of the first stage of the British effort to capture or neutralise the vessels of the French Navy, codenamed Operation Catapult, the ships in the British ports of Plymouth and Portsmouth were simply boarded on the night of 3 July 1940. The crew of the then-largest submarine in the world, Surcouf, which had sought refuge in Portsmouth in June 1940 following the German invasion of France, resisted the British operation. In capturing the submarine, two British officers and one French sailor were killed. Other ships were the two obsolete battleships Paris and Courbet; the destroyers Le Triomphant and Léopard; eight torpedo boats; five submarines (including Minerve and Junon) and a number of other smaller vessels. Some 3,600 sailors operating 50 ships around the world joined with the Royal Navy and formed the nucleus of the Free French Naval Forces. France's surrender found her only aircraft carrier, Béarn, en route from the United States loaded with a precious cargo of American fighter and bomber aircraft. Unwilling to return to occupied France, but likewise reluctant to join de Gaulle, Béarn instead sought harbour in Martinique, her crew showing little inclination to side with the British in their continued fight against the Nazis. Already obsolete at the start of the war, she would remain in Martinique for the next four years, her and her aircraft deteriorating in the tropical climate.

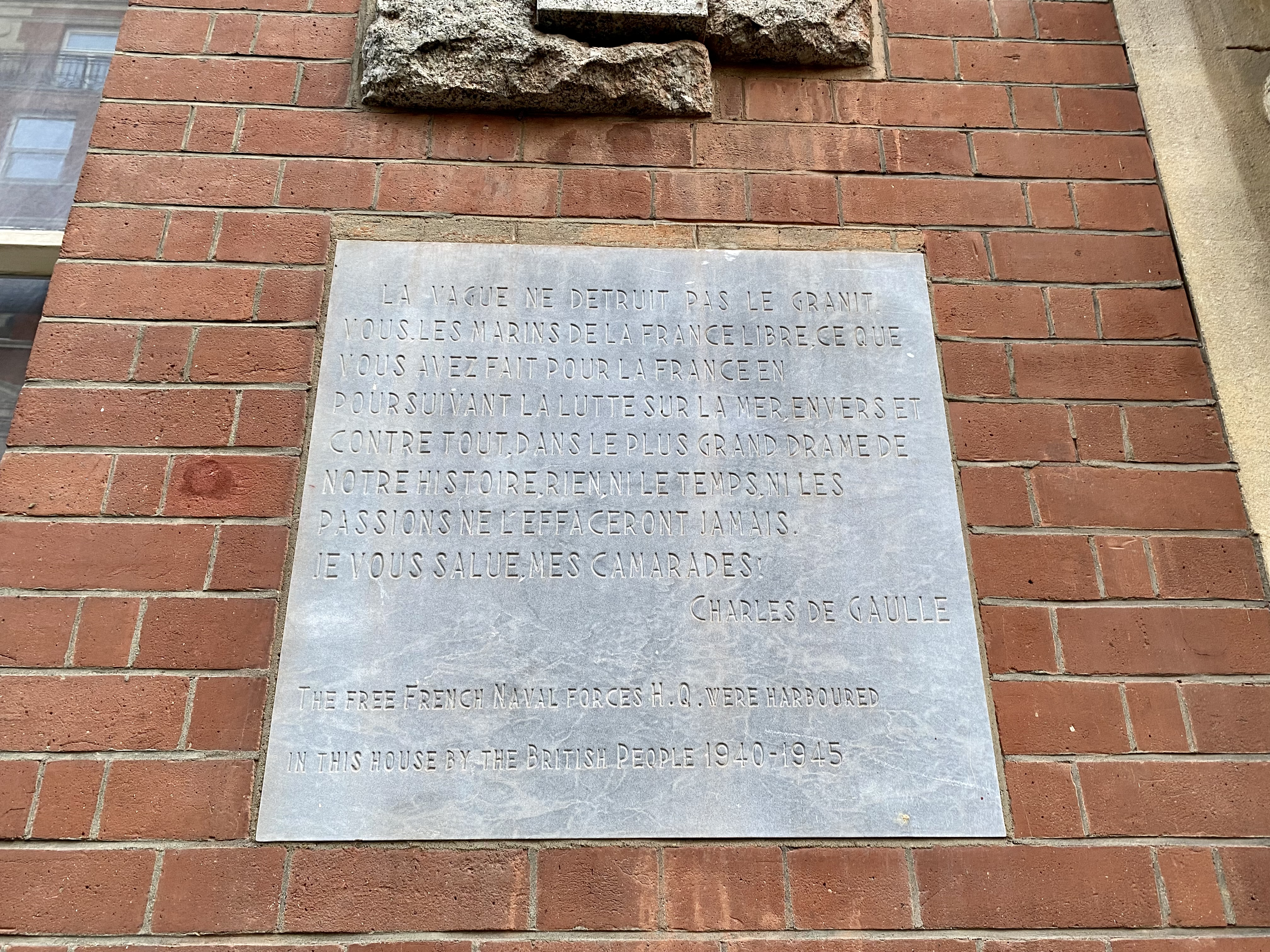
Plaque on Stafford Mansions, the headquarters of the Free French Naval Forces between 1940 and 1945 in Westminster, London

As early as the summer of 1940, the submarines Minerve and Junon, as well as four avisos, departed from Plymouth. Towards the end of 1940, the destroyers Le Triomphant and Léopard followed. Le Triomphant sailed for New Caledonia and spent the rest of the war based there and in Australia. The ship saw action in both the Pacific and Indian Oceans.

Civilian vessels and crew also rallied to de Gaulle, starting with four cargo ships in Gibraltar - they would be the beginning of the merchant fleet of the FNFL.

To distinguish the FNFL from the forces of Vichy France (which was collaborating with Nazi Germany), Vice-Admiral Émile Muselier created a bow flag displaying the French colours with a red Cross of Lorraine, and a roundel also featuring the Cross of Lorraine for aircraft of the Free French Naval Air Service (Aéronavale Française Libre) and the Free French Air Force (Forces Aériennes Françaises Libres).

A number of ships were leased from the British to compensate for the lack of warships in the FNFL, among them, the Hunt-class destroyer La Combattante and the Flower-class corvette Aconit.

The FNFL suffered their first loss when the patrol boat Poulmic hit a mine and sank on 7 November 1940 off Plymouth.

=== Africa ===
Soon after the fall of France, Free France was but a government in exile based in England, with no land of its own to speak of and very few land or sea forces. In an attempt to establish his authority on an important French territory, General de Gaulle attempted to rally French West Africa by personally sailing to Dakar with a British fleet which included a few Free French units; at the same time, a cruiser force had been sent by Vichy France to reclaim African territories which had already announced their support of de Gaulle (notably Chad). The resulting Battle of Dakar ended in a Vichyite victory. However, after the occupation of Vichy France by the Germans after the Allied invasion of North Africa in November 1942, French West Africa also eventually joined the Free French. As a result, important ships based in Dakar were obtained: the modern battleship Richelieu; the heavy cruiser Suffren; light cruisers Gloire, Montcalm and Georges Leygues; and a few destroyers, including cruiser-sized Le Fantasque-class destroyers.

=== Role in the French Resistance ===
Captain Henri Honoré d'Estienne d'Orves answered the call to join de Gaulle and arrived in London on September 1940. Unable to obtain a sea command, he asked to join the French Resistance and was landed in Western France to organise a Resistance network. Betrayed and arrested by the Gestapo in January 1941, d'Estienne d'Orves became an inspiring symbol after he was tortured and executed.

=== D-Day: Operation Neptune ===
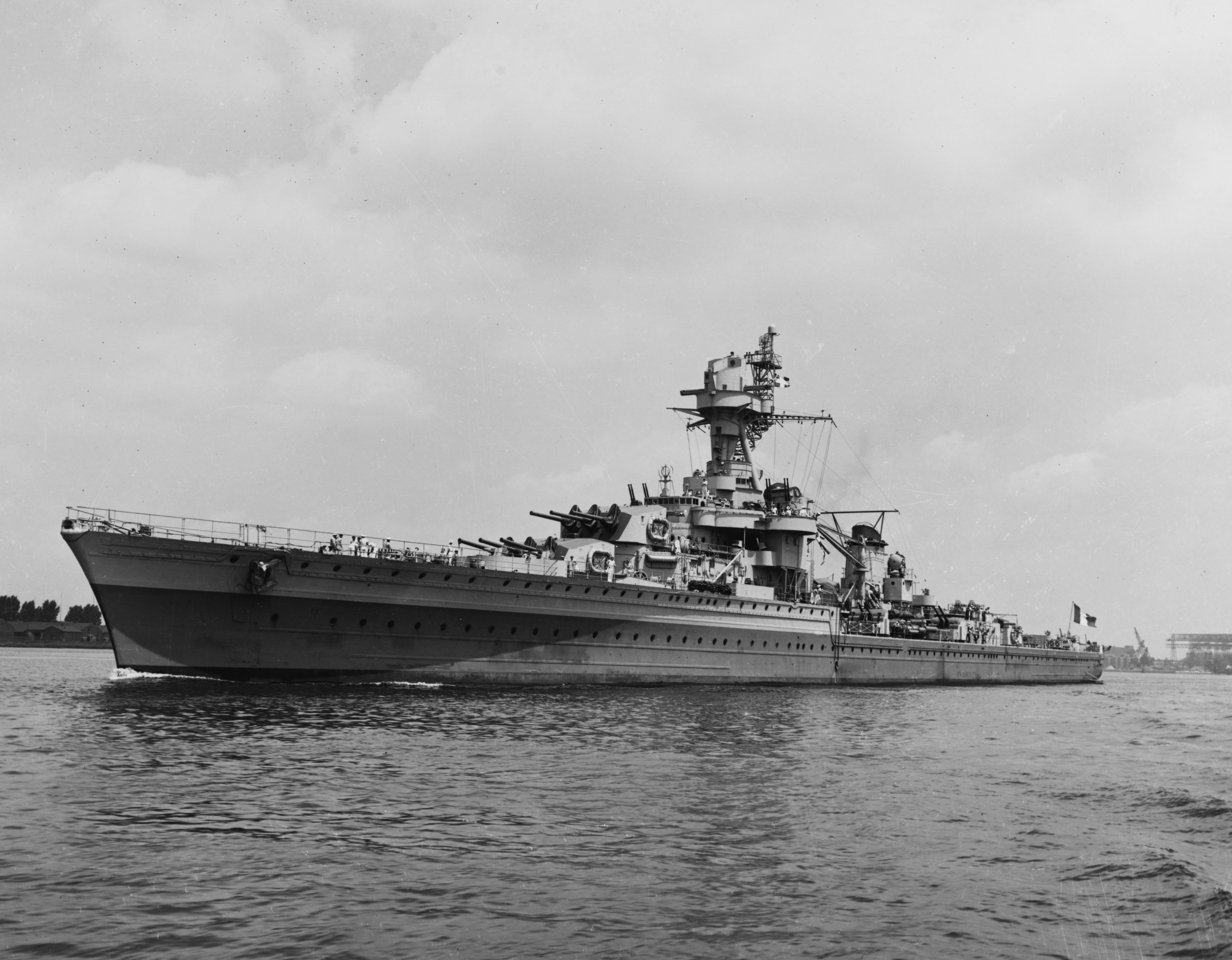
Free French light cruiser Montcalm photographed in 1943

In the summer of 1944, the Invasion of Normandy took place. The FNFL took part in both the naval side of the operations, Operation Neptune, and the landing itself, with the Naval Commandos (Commandos Marine) of Captain Philippe Kieffer climbing cliffs under fire to destroy German shore batteries.

Several ships of the FNFL were deployed off the landing sites :

- Utah Beach: corvettes Aconit and Renoncule
- Omaha Beach: cruisers Georges Leygues and Montcalm; frigates L'Escarmouche and Aventure; and corvette Roselys
- Gold Beach: corvette Surprise
- Juno Beach: frigate Découverte; corvette Estienne d'Orves; and torpedo boat La Combattante

In addition the obsolete battleship Courbet was scuttled off Arromanches to serve as a breakwater for a Mulberry harbour.

The cruisers Georges Leygues and Montcalm, along with the battleship USS Arkansas provided fire support for the infantry until 10 June.

La Combattante silenced German coastal artillery deployed at Courseulles. The next day, she started patrolling the English Channel. On 14 July, she ferried General Charles de Gaulle to France.

=== Pacific War ===
Le Triomphant, under the command of Philippe Auboyneau was transferred to the Pacific theatre of the war, where in February 1942 it took part in the evacuation of European and Chinese civilians and military personnel from Nauru and Ocean Island in anticipation of Japanese invasions of Nauru and the Gilbert Islands. Triomphant was later stationed along the east coast of Australia, where in early 1943 it was involved in the rescue of survivors from SS Iron Knight, which was sunk by a torpedo launched by the Japanese submarine I-21. After the rescue, Triomphant then searched for I-21 for a day, but without success.

From 1944, the battleship Richelieu and destroyer leaders Le Terrible and Le Fantasque operated with the British Eastern Fleet in combat operations against Japan, and later took part in Operation Tiderace, the takeover of Singapore a month after the end of the war, during which Richelieu was damaged by a mine.

== Technical innovations ==
The FNFL also harboured technical innovators, such as Captain Jacques-Yves Cousteau, who invented the modern aqua-lung; and Yves Rocard, who helped perfect radar. The aqua-lung became a major improvement for commando operations. However, Jacques Cousteau joined the FNFL only after the liberation of France. He had spent the entirety of the war to that point in France and developed the aqua-lung in Paris during the German occupation.

== Losses ==
The merchant fleet of the FNFL suffered heavy casualties, amounting to one quarter of its men.

A number of warships were lost, notably the submarine Surcouf, possibly sunk in a friendly fire incident. Other losses include the destroyers Léopard and La Combattante; the submarine Narval; the patrol boats Poulmic and Vikings, and the corvettes Mimosa and Alysse.

== See also ==
- List of submarines of France
- List of ships of the Free French Naval Forces
- List of Escorteurs of the French Navy
- Battle of Ist
