= ARM Usumacinta =

ARM Usumacinta may refer to one of the following vessels of the Mexican Navy named for the Usumacinta River:

- ARM Usumacinta (B06), the former American Crosley-class high speed transport USS Don O. Woods (APD-118), launched February 1944; acquired by the Mexican Navy, December 1963; renamed Miguel Hidalgo after Miguel Hidalgo y Costilla, 1994; reverted to name of Usumacinta; stricken July 2001
- ARM Usumacinta (A412), the former American Newport-class tank landing ship USS Frederick (LST-1184), launched March 1969; acquired by the Mexican Navy, November 2002; in active service
