= USS Kline =

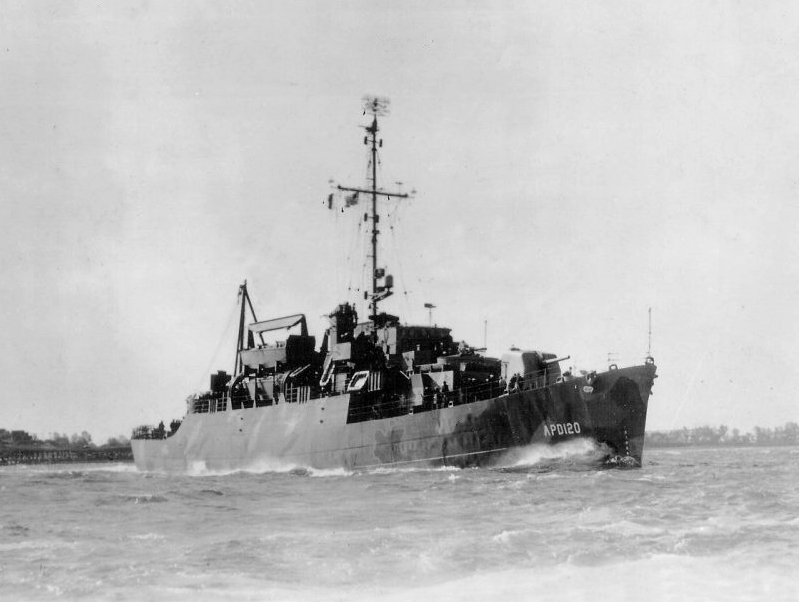

History

United States
- Name: USS Kline (DE-687)
- Namesake: Stanley F. Kline (1901-1942), a U.S. Navy sailor and Silver Star recipient
- Builder: Bethlehem Steel Company, Quincy, Massachusetts
- Laid down: 27 May 1944 as Rudderow-class destroyer escort
- Launched: 27 June 1944
- Sponsored by: Mrs. Hazel Kline
- Reclassified: APD-120, 17 July 1944
- Commissioned: 18 October 1944
- Decommissioned: 10 March 1947
- Stricken: 15 January 1966
- Honors and awards: Two battle stars for World War II service
- Fate: Transferred to the Republic of China, 22 January 1966 or 22 February 1966;

History

Taiwan
- Name: ROCS Shou Shan (DE-37)
- Acquired: early 1966
- Reclassified: PF-37
- Reclassified: PF-893
- Reclassified: PF-837
- Decommissioned: 16 March 1997
- Fate: Sunk as target, 18 October 2000

General characteristics
- Class & type: Crosley-class high speed transport
- Displacement: 2,130 long tons (2,164 t) full
- Length: 306 ft (93 m)
- Beam: 37 ft (11 m)
- Draft: 12 ft 7 in (3.84 m)
- Speed: 23 knots (43 km/h; 26 mph)
- Troops: 162
- Complement: 204
- Armament: 1 × 5 in (130 mm) gun; 6 × 40 mm guns; 6 × 20 mm guns; 2 × depth charge tracks

USS Kline (APD-120) was a Crosley-class high-speed transport in commission with the United States Navy from 1944 to 1947. She was transferred to the Republic of China Navy in 1966 and served as ROCS Shou Shan (PF-37/PF-893/PF-837) until 1997. She was finally sunk as a target in 2000.

== Namesake ==
Stanley Fly Kline was born on 15 November 1901 in Graterford, Pennsylvania. He enlisted in the United States Naval Reserve on 2 February 1927 and began World War II active duty on 13 July 1942.

During Operation Torch, the Allied amphibious landings in North Africa, on 8 November 1942, Kline was assigned to the British Royal Navy warship HMS Hartland as a member of a naval antisabotage party. As Hartland entered the harbor at Oran, Algeria, it came under heavy fire from Vichy French ships and shore batteries. When a shell exploded in a compartment occupied by the boarding party, the survivors found themselves trapped by fire and fumes. Kline, crawling through a small overhead hatch and worming his way along the deck under a hail of shells and machine-gun fire, opened a large hatch and assisted 42 men to safety. He then turned to loading ammunition clips for an automatic rifle and continued his conduct with complete disregard of his own safety until killed by a shell explosion. Kline was posthumously awarded the Silver Star.

== History ==
=== Construction and commissioning ===
Kline was laid down as the Rudderow-class destroyer escort USS Kline (DE-687) on 27 May 1944 by the Bethlehem Steel Company at Quincy, Massachusetts, and was launched on 27 June 1944, sponsored by Mrs. Hazel Kline, the widow of the ship's namesake. Kline was reclassified as a Crosley-class high-speed transport and redesignated APD-119 on 17 July 1944. After conversion for her new role, she was commissioned on 18 October 1944.

=== U.S. Navy ===
==== World War II ====
While en route to shakedown at Bermuda on 6 November 1944, Kline rescued nine survivors from the U.S. Navy K-class blimp K-34, which had been forced down in a storm. Completing her shakedown, Kline cleared Norfolk, Virginia, on 24 December 1944 for World War II service in the Pacific.

Upon arriving at Pearl Harbor, Territory of Hawaii, on 20 January 1945, Kline trained underwater demolition teams until departing on 14 February 1945 for Leyte in the Philippine Islands. Intensive pre-invasion exercises were completed in the Philippines before Kline arrived off Okinawa on 26 March 1945. Kline's underwater demolition team cleared the approaches to the island. After the main invasion force landed on Okinawa on 1 April 1945, Kline remained in the area in support of the Okinawa campaign as radar and antisubmarine warfare picket. Her guns also assisted in shooting down a Japanese aircraft on 1 April 1945 and helped down another on 6 April 1945.

Kline departed the Okinawa area on 16 April 1945 and for the next six weeks underwent training and repairs. Departing for Borneo on 2 June 1945, Kline provided close fire support during the invasion of Brunei Bay on Borneo on 10 June 1945, and on 24 June 1945 her underwater demolition team gave valuable service during the invasion of Balikpapan.

Kline departed Netherlands East Indies waters on 7 July 1945 and, sailing via the Caroline Islands and Marshall Islands, arrived at Oceanside, California, on 5 August 1945.

==== Postwar ====
Following the surrender of Japan and end of World War II on 15 August 1945, Kline departed California for Japan, arriving at Sasebo, Japan, on 20 September 1945 to commence underwater reconnaissance missions. After similar operations at Nagasaki, Japan, she returned to the United States at San Diego, California, on 19 October 1945 to prepare for Operation Magic Carpet—the seaborne postwar repatriation of American serviceman from overseas—service. Kline made one Magic Carpet cruise to Pearl Harbor and returned 110 Pacific veterans to San Diego on 19 November 1945.

On 21 November 1945 Kline departed San Diego for the United States East Coast, arriving at Norfolk on 5 December 1945. On 28 January 1946, Kline arrived at Green Cove Springs, Florida, for inactivation.

Kline was decommissioned on 10 March 1947 at Green Cove Springs and joined the Atlantic Reserve Fleet there. After nearly 19 years of inactivity, she was stricken from the Naval Vessel Register on 15 January 1966.

=== Republic of China Navy service ===
On either 22 January 1966 or 22 February 1966, Kline was sold to the Republic of China under the Military Assistance Program. In the Republic of China Navy she served as ROCS Shou Shan (PF-37), later redesignated PF-893 and later again redesignated PF-837. Shou Shan was decommissioned 16 March 1997 and was sunk as a target in an air-strike exercise on 18 October 2000.

== Honors and awards ==
Kline received two battle stars for World War II service.
