= USS Ringness =

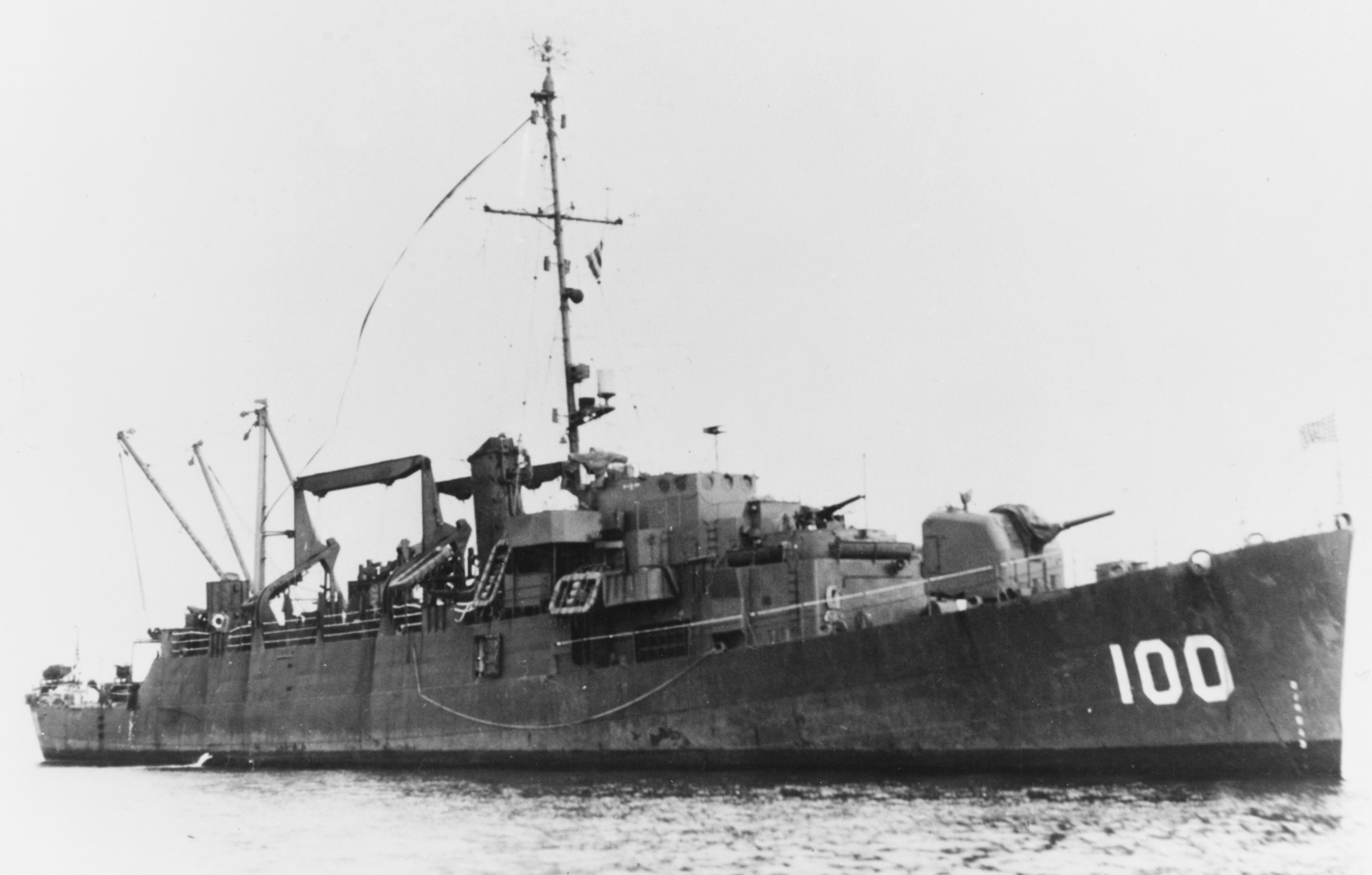

History

United States
- Name: USS Ringness
- Namesake: Henry Raymond Ringness
- Builder: Bethlehem-Hingham Shipyard, Hingham, Massachusetts
- Laid down: 23 December 1943
- Launched: 5 February 1944
- Sponsored by: Mrs. Henry R. Ringness
- Commissioned: 25 October 1944
- Decommissioned: 5 June 1946
- Reclassified: LPR-100, 1 July 1969
- Stricken: 15 September 1974
- Honors and awards: 1 battle star for World War II service
- Fate: Sold for scrapping, 1 July 1975

General characteristics
- Class & type: Crosley-class high speed transport
- Displacement: 2,130 long tons (2,164 t) full
- Length: 306 ft (93 m)
- Beam: 37 ft (11 m)
- Draft: 12 ft 7 in (3.84 m)
- Speed: 23 knots (43 km/h; 26 mph)
- Troops: 162
- Complement: 204
- Armament: 1 × 5 in (130 mm) gun; 6 × 40 mm guns; 6 × 20 mm guns; 2 × depth charge tracks

USS Ringness (APD-100) was a Crosley-class high speed transport that served in the United States Navy from 1944 to 1946. After spending 29 years in reserve, she was sold for scrapping in 1975.

== Namesake ==
Henry Raymond Ringness was born on 17 August 1912 in Morris, Minnesota. He was appointed First Lieutenant, Medical Corps Reserve, United States Army, on 14 June 1939.

On 28 June 1939 Ringness resigned from the U.S. Army to accept a commission in the U.S. Navy. He was commissioned as a regular assistant surgeon with rank of lieutenant, junior grade from 7 July 1941. He served at the Naval Medical School in Washington, D.C., at Naval Air Station Pensacola, Florida, and in the First Marine Aircraft Wing, Fleet Marine Force. He was promoted to Lieutenant on 15 June 1942.

Ringness served on Guadalcanal during the Guadalcanal campaign in 1942 and was mortally wounded during the Japanese battleship bombardment of Henderson Field on the night of 13–14 October 1942. Despite his wounds, he continued to assist other wounded personnel. Three days later, on 17 October 1942, he died as a result of his injuries. He was posthumously awarded the Navy Cross.

== History ==
=== Construction and commissioning ===
Ringness was laid down as the Rudderow-class destroyer escort USS Ringness (DE-590), on 23 December 1943 by Bethlehem-Hingham Shipyard, Hingham, Massachusetts, and launched on 5 February 1944, sponsored by Mrs. Henry R. Ringness. The ship was reclassified as a Crosley-class high speed transport and redesignated APD-100 on 17 July 1944. The ship was commissioned on 25 October 1944.

=== Pacific War ===
Following shakedown off Bermuda and amphibious warfare exercises in Chesapeake Bay, Ringness steamed in convoy for the Pacific on 21 December 1944. She transited the Panama Canal, stopped at San Diego, California, and reached Pearl Harbor, Territory of Hawaii, on 15 January 1945. After training in the Hawaiian area, she departed Pearl Harbor on 1 March 1945 for Funafuti in the Ellice Islands, Port Purvis on Florida Island in the Solomons, and Ulithi Atoll in the Caroline Islands, where she arrived on 22 March 1945.

After further training Ringness proceeded on 24 March 1945 to Saipan, getting underway for Okinawa on 27 March 1945, escorting Task Group 51.2 composed of escorts, transports, and cargo ships, take part in the Okinawa campaign.

==== Okinawa campaign ====
The amphibious landings on Okinawa took place on 1 April 1945, and during the two days following, Ringness engaged in anti-suicide boat patrol along the southeast coast of Okinawa, where intelligence reports had located Japanese suicide-boat nests. On the night of 2 April 1945, Ringness attacked a Japanese midget submarine with undetermined results.

On 3 April 1945 Ringness steamed to Ulithi Atoll for supplies, returning to Okinawa with Task Group 53.8. Upon arrival she was assigned to anti-submarine and anti-aircraft patrol, undergoing numerous air attacks. This patrol lasted only four days before she steamed as a convoy escort to Saipan.

On 23 April 1945 Ringness again steamed for Okinawa, escorting a convoy of tank landing ships (LSTs) and medium landing ships (LSMs). On 27 April 1945, a Japanese submarine fired two torpedoes at her. Ringness replied with gunfire and a depth charge attack, with undetermined results.

On 30 April 1945, Ringness arrived at Okinawa for the third time since the Okinawa campaign began, remaining there for the entire month of May 1945. During this time she maintained her various anti-submarine and anti-aircraft screen stations. On 4 May Ringness witnessed the death dive of a kamikaze onto the flight deck of the escort aircraft carrier Sangamon (CVE-26), turning Sangamon into a roaring inferno. Ringness stood by the crippled vessel and rescued some of the men forced over the side by flames and explosions.

On 11 May 1945, Ringness proceeded to Radar Picket Station 15 for rescue and salvage work on destroyers Hugh W. Hadley (DD-774) and Evans (DD-552), which had born the brunt of one of the heaviest Japanese air attacks of this period. On the night of 16 May 1945, just off Okinawa, Ringness dodged an oncoming kamikaze, getting credit for shooting it down. At the end of May, Ringness escorted a convoy to Ulithi Atoll, arriving there on 6 June 1945.

==== Convoy escort duty ====
Ringness then proceeded on to Leyte in the Philippine Islands. After further convoy escort duty between Leyte, Okinawa, and Ulithi Atoll, Ringness was diverted from her escort duty on 3 August 1945 and rescued 39 survivors of the sinking of the heavy cruiser Indianapolis (CA-35) including its captain Charles B. McVay III.

=== Post-World War II service ===
Ringness was in Leyte Gulf at the end of World War II on 15 August 1945. She proceeded to Okinawa, then participated in the occupation landings at Jinsen, Korea. On 26 September, Ringness was detached and departed Jinsen for Okinawa.

On 29 September 1945, Ringness commenced her second occupation operation as sole escort for Task Unit 78.1.94 bound for Tientsin, China. On 9 October 1945 she shifted to Qingdao, China, serving as 7th Amphibious Force Beachmaster (Director of Disembarkation) Flagship. She remained at Qingdao until departing for the United States on 29 January 1946. She arrived at San Pedro, California, on 23 February 1946, transited the Panama Canal, and put into Norfolk, Virginia, on 14 March 1946.

=== Decommissioning and fate ===
Ringness reported for lay-up at Green Cove Springs, Florida, on 4 April 1946. She was subsequently towed from Green Cove Springs to Naval Station Mayport at Mayport, Florida, and Naval Station Charleston at Charleston, South Carolina, at various times in 1947 and 1948.

Ringness was decommissioned and placed in the Atlantic Reserve Fleet on 5 June 1946, berthed at Atlantic Reserve Fleet, Green Cove Springs. In 1959 she was towed to Norfolk, where she remained as part of the Atlantic Reserve Fleet, Norfolk until berthed at Atlantic Reserve Fleet, Orange in Orange, Texas, in 1966 as part of the Atlantic Reserve Fleet Texas Group. Reclassified as an "amphibious transport, small," and redesignated LPR-100 on 1 July 1969, Ringness was sold for scrapping on 1 July 1975.

== Awards ==
Ringness earned one battle star for World War II service.
