= USS Joseph M. Auman =

Crosley-class high-speed transport ship commissioned by the U.S. during WWII

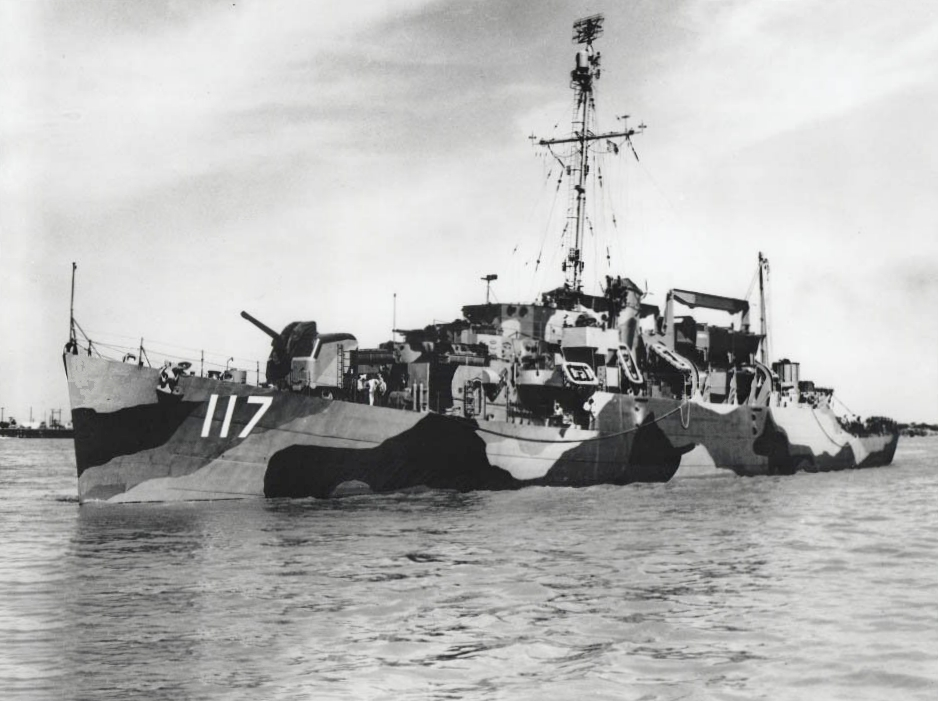
- USS Joseph M. Auman off Orange, Texas, on 30 April 1945,
- five days after she was commissioned

History

United States
- Name: USS Joseph M. Auman (DE-674)
- Namesake: Joseph M. Auman
- Builder: Dravo Corporation, Pittsburgh; completed at Consolidated Steel Company, Orange, Texas
- Laid down: 8 November 1943
- Launched: 5 February 1944
- Commissioned: 25 April 1945
- Decommissioned: 10 July 1946
- Reclassified: APD-117, 17 July 1944
- Stricken: 12 December 1963
- Fate: Sold to Mexican Navy, 12 December 1963

History

Mexico
- Name: ARM Tehuantupec (H05)
- Namesake: Gulf of Tehuantepec
- Acquired: 12 December 1963
- Stricken: 1989
- Fate: Sold for scrapping, 1989

General characteristics
- Class & type: Rudderow-class destroyer escort, as ordered; Crosley-class high speed transport, as completed
- Displacement: 2,130 long tons (2,164 t) full
- Length: 306 ft (93 m)
- Beam: 37 ft (11 m)
- Draft: 12 ft 7 in (3.84 m)
- Speed: 23 knots (43 km/h; 26 mph)
- Troops: 162
- Complement: 204
- Armament: 1 × 5 in (130 mm)/38 gun; 6 × 40 mm guns; 6 × 20 mm guns; 2 × depth charge tracks

USS Joseph M. Auman (APD-117), was a Crosley-class high-speed transport commissioned in the United States Navy from 1945 to 1946. In 1963, she was transferred to the Mexican Navy and served as ARM Tehuantupec (H05) until 1989. Afterwards, she was scrapped.

== Namesake ==
Joseph Martin Auman was born on 4 January 1922 in Chicago, Illinois. He enlisted in the United States Marine Corps on 27 August 1940 at Chicago. After duty at San Diego, Private Auman served at Guadalcanal where he was killed in action 12 November 1942. When his company was forced to make a temporary withdrawal, he manned a machine gun and covered the retreat, remaining at his exposed position, he continued to fire his gun until killed by the Japanese. He was posthumously awarded the Navy Cross.

== History ==
=== U.S. Navy (1945-1946) ===
Joseph M. Auman was laid down as the Rudderow-class destroyer escort USS Joseph M. Auman (DE-674) on 8 November 1943 by the Consolidated Steel Company at Orange, Texas, and was launched on 5 February 1944, sponsored by Mrs. Bernard Toomey, the aunt of the ship's namesake. The ship was reclassified as a Crosley-class high-speed transport and redesignated APD-117 on 17 July 1944. After conversion to her new role, she was commissioned on 25 April 1945.

After shakedown out of Guantánamo Bay, Cuba, Joseph M. Auman departed Norfolk, Virginia, on 9 July 1945, reaching San Diego, California, on 24 July 1945 via the Panama Canal. She conducted more intensive training with the San Diego Shakedown Group, then embarked Underwater Demolition Team 7 and carried them to Yoriage Beach at Shiogama, Japan, for reconnaissance of amphibious landing beaches. After completing the mission, she returned the underwater demolition team to San Diego on 13 October 1945.

Joseph M. Auman departed San Diego 20 October 1945 and steamed to Manila Bay in the Philippine Islands, where she embarked 100 U.S. Navy passengers and carried them to Samar. At Samar she loaded cargo and delivered it to Shanghai, China, on 4 December 1945. Joseph M. Auman continued to carry cargo and passengers in the Pacific until she returned to the United States during the first half of 1946.

Joseph M. Auman was decommissioned at Green Cove Springs, Florida, on 10 July 1946, joining the Florida Group of the Atlantic Reserve Fleet on the St. Johns River there. She remained in the reserve fleet until stricken from the Navy List on 12 December 1963.

=== Mexican Navy (1963-1989) ===
Joseph M. Auman was sold to the government of Mexico on 12 December 1963. She served in the Mexican Navy as ARM Tehuantepec (B05) until stricken in 1989 and sold for scrapping.
