= USS Julius A. Raven =

History

United States
- Name: USS Julius A. Raven
- Namesake: Lieutenant, junior grade, Julius A. Raven (1918-1942), a U.S. Navy officer and Distinguished Flying Cross and Air Medal recipient
- Builder: Bethlehem-Hingham Shipyard, Inc., Hingham, Massachusetts
- Laid down: 26 January 1944
- Launched: 3 March 1944
- Sponsored by: Mrs. Irene E. Raven
- Commissioned: 28 June 1945
- Decommissioned: 31 May 1946
- Reclassified: From destroyer escort (DE-600) to high-speed transport (APD-110) 17 July 1944
- Stricken: 15 January 1966
- Fate: Transferred to South Korea on 13 January 1966
- Notes: Laid down as Rudderow-class destroyer escort USS Julius A. Raven (DE-600)

History

South Korea
- Name: ROKS Ung Po (PG-83)
- Acquired: 13 January 1966
- Reclassified: APD-823, date unknown
- Reclassified: DE-825, date unknown
- Fate: Deleted 1984; Scrapped

General characteristics
- Class & type: Crosley-class high speed transport
- Displacement: 2,130 long tons (2,164 t) full
- Length: 306 ft (93 m)
- Beam: 37 ft (11 m)
- Draft: 12 ft 7 in (3.84 m)
- Speed: 23 knots (43 km/h; 26 mph)
- Troops: 162
- Complement: 204
- Armament: 1 × 5 in (130 mm) gun; 6 × 40 mm guns; 6 × 20 mm guns; 2 × depth charge tracks

USS Julius A. Raven (APD-110), ex-DE-600, was a United States Navy high-speed transport in commission from 1945 to 1946. She later served in the Republic of Korea Navy as ROKS Ung Po (PG-83).

== Namesake ==
Julius Arthur Raven was born on 6 January 1918 in New York City. He enlisted in the United States Naval Reserve as seaman second class on 5 June 1939 at New York City. He was discharged and accepted an appointment as Aviation Cadet on 5 September 1939. After preliminary flight training at the Naval Reserve Aviation Base, Floyd Bennett Field, New York, he was assigned advanced training at Naval Air Station Pensacola, Florida. After flight school, Raven was assigned to a patrol squadron in the Pacific, where he served during World War II.

On 25 June 1942, while returning from a combat mission in the Aleutian Islands and flying over Japanese-controlled waters, Raven sighted the U.S. Navy submarine USS S-27, which had run aground on Amchitka Island. Raven landed in a rough sea, embarked 13 of the submarine's crew, and took off, all without damage to his plane. He safely returned them to Dutch Harbor on Unalaska Island. All of the men of S-27 were later rescued due to the information on their whereabouts provided by Raven.

During the Aleutian Islands campaign, Raven conducted reconnaissance and bombing runs against Japanese-occupied Kiska Island until he was lost at sea while on a mission on 9 August 1942. For the S-27 incident, Raven was awarded the Air Medal for meritorious achievement and extreme courage while effecting a rescue at sea. Posthumously, he also received the Distinguished Flying Cross.

== Construction and commissioning ==
Julius A. Raven was laid down as the Rudderow-class destroyer escort USS Julius A. Raven (DE-600) on 26 January 1944 by Bethlehem-Hingham Shipyard, Inc., at Hingham, Massachusetts, and was launched on 3 March 1944, sponsored by Mrs. Irene E. Raven, the widow of the ship's namesake. The ship was reclassified as a Crosley-class high-speed transport and redesignated APD-110 on 17 July 1944. After conversion to her new role, she was commissioned on 28 June 1945.

== Service history ==
After shakedown training in the Caribbean, Julius A. Raven served as a training ship at Miami, Florida, for student officers during her active U.S. Navy career.

== Decommissioning and disposal ==
Julius A. Raven was decommissioned on 31 May 1946 at Green Cove Springs, Florida, and placed in reserve there as part of the Atlantic Reserve Fleet. In July 1959, she was moved to the Texas Group, Atlantic Reserve Fleet, where she remained until stricken from the Navy List on 15 January 1966.

== South Korean service ==
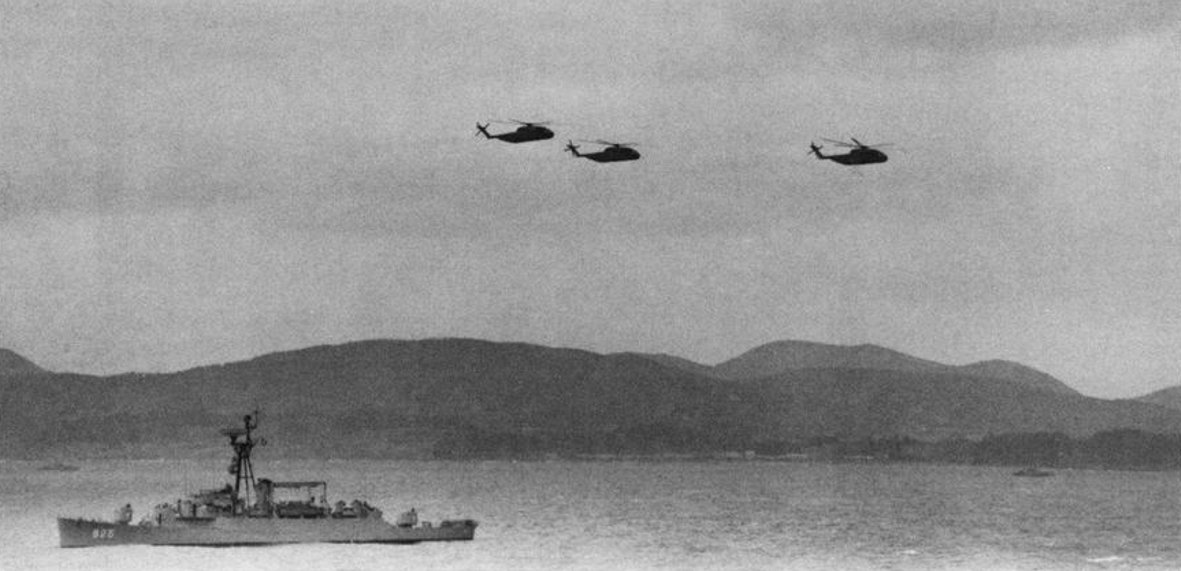
ROKS Ung Po in 1982

Loaned to South Korea on 13 January 1966 under the Military Assistance Program, Julius A. Raven became ROKS Ung Po (PG-83) in the Republic of Korea Navy. She later was redesignated APD-825 and then DE-825. South Korea purchased Ung Po outright from the United States on 15 November 1974.

The Republic of Korea Navy deleted Ung Po in 1984, and she subsequently was scrapped.
