= USS Harry L. Corl =

Transport ship in United States Navy

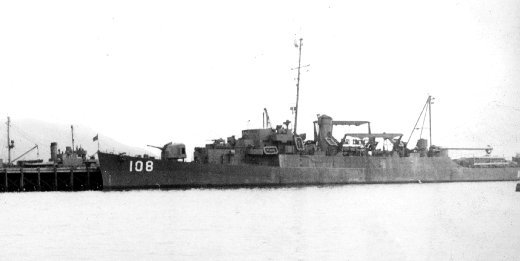
- USS Harry L. Corl at Attu, sometime between September and November 1945

History

United States
- Name: USS Harry L. Corl
- Namesake: Ensign Harry L. Corl (1914–1942), a U.S. Navy officer and Navy Cross recipient
- Builder: Bethlehem-Hingham Shipyard, Inc., Hingham, Massachusetts
- Laid down: 19 January 1944
- Launched: 1 March 1944
- Sponsored by: Mrs. Marie Mohr
- Commissioned: 5 June 1945
- Decommissioned: 21 June 1946
- Reclassified: From destroyer escort (DE-598) to high-speed transport (APD-108) 17 July 1944
- Stricken: 15 January 1966
- Fate: Transferred to South Korea May 1966; served as ROKS Ah San (PG-82), later APD-82, later APD-823, later DE-823; deleted 1984 and scrapped
- Notes: Laid down as Rudderow-class destroyer escort USS Harry L. Corl (DE-598)

General characteristics
- Class & type: Crosley-class high speed transport
- Displacement: 2,130 long tons (2,164 t) full
- Length: 306 ft (93 m)
- Beam: 37 ft (11 m)
- Draft: 12 ft 7 in (3.84 m)
- Speed: 23 knots (43 km/h; 26 mph)
- Troops: 162
- Complement: 204
- Armament: 1 × 5 in (130 mm) gun; 6 × 40 mm guns; 6 × 20 mm guns; 2 × depth charge tracks

USS Harry L. Corl (APD-108) was a Crosley-class high speed transport that served in the United States Navy from 1945 to 1946. Harry L. Corl was transferred to South Korea in 1966 and served as Ah San until 1984. She was subsequently scrapped.

== Namesake ==
Harry Lee Corl was born on 26 March 1914 in Lambertville, Michigan. He enlisted in the Navy on 20 November 1934. He was discharged in 1938, but enlisted again the following year, rising to Ensign on 15 June 1942. He was awarded the Navy Cross for his actions in the Battle of Midway, when he was the pilot of a torpedo plane in the assault against the Imperial Japanese Navy fleet. He was reported missing on a mission in the South Pacific on 24 August 1942, and was presumed dead 25 August.

== History ==
=== U.S. Navy (1945–1946) ===
==== Construction and commissioning ====
Harry L. Corl was laid down as the Rudderow-class destroyer escort USS Harry L. Corl (DE-598) on 19 January 1944 by Bethlehem-Hingham Shipyard, Inc., at Hingham, Massachusetts, and was launched on 1 March 1944, sponsored by Mrs. Marie Mohr, the sister of the ship's namesake, Ensign Harry L. Corl. The ship was reclassified as a Crosley-class high-speed transport and redesignated APD-108 on 17 July 1944. After conversion to her new role, she was commissioned on 5 June 1945.

==== North Pacific ====
Following her shakedown training in the Caribbean, Harry L. Corl departed Norfolk, Virginia, for the United States West Coast on 4 August 1945. She arrived at San Diego, California, on 19 August 1945, four days after the end of World War II.

Harry L. Corl was assigned the duty of carrying supplies and men to northern Pacific ports. Arriving at Seattle, Washington, on 26 August 1945, she took on passengers and equipment for northern weather stations. She arrived at Dutch Harbor, Territory of Alaska, on 1 September 1945 and at Petropavlovsk-Kamchatsky on the Kamchatka Peninsula in the Soviet Union on 6 September 1945. There she unloaded cargo and helped to establish a weather station.

Harry L. Corl made three more supply voyages from Attu in the Aleutian Islands to Petropavlovsk-Kamchatsky, and then steamed to Seattle on 21 November 1945. After a voyage to Alaskan ports with passengers she returned to Seattle on 11 January 1946.

Scheduled for inactivation, Harry L. Corl then set course for San Francisco, California. She departed San Francisco on 26 February 1946 bound for the United States East Coast. She arrived at New York City on 20 March 1946 and at Green Cove Springs, Florida, on 12 April 1946.

==== Decommissioning ====
Harry L. Corl was decommissioned at Green Cove Springs on 21 June 1946 and subsequently was placed in the Atlantic Reserve Fleet, where she remained, inactive, for more than 20 years. Her name was stricken from the Navy List on 15 January 1966.

=== Republic of Korea Navy (1966–1984) ===
Harry L. Corl was delivered to South Korea in May 1966. In the Republic of Korea Navy, she served as ROKS Ah San (PG-82). Over her years of service, Ah San's designation was changed from PG-82 to APD-82, then to APD-823, and finally to DE-823.

The Republic of Korea Navy deleted Ah San in 1984. She subsequently was scrapped.
