= USS Myers =

1944 US Navy ship

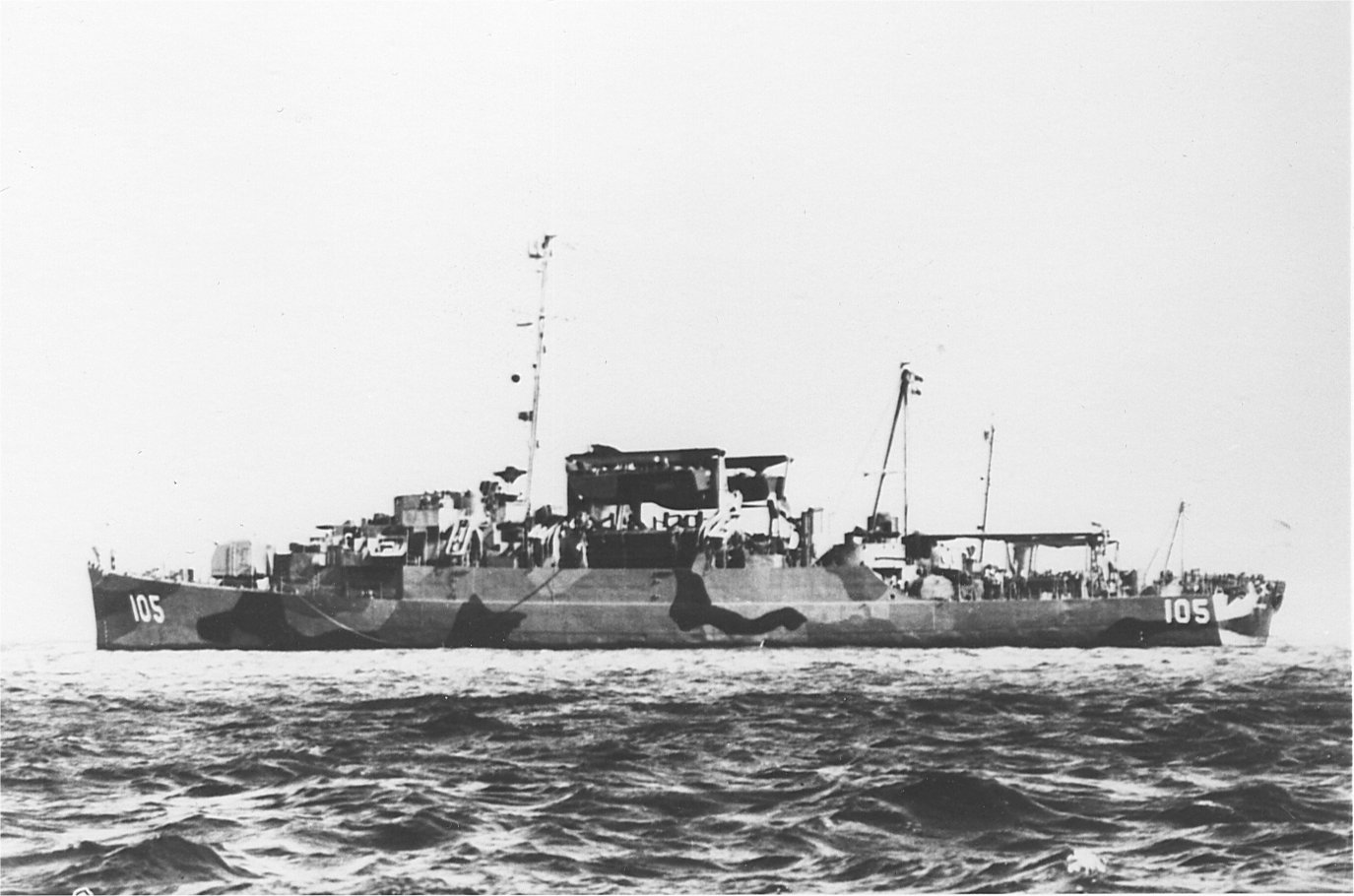
- USS Myers

History

United States
- Name: USS Myers
- Namesake: Machinist's Mate First Class Merton B. Myers (1921-1943), a U.S. Navy sailor and Navy Cross recipient
- Builder: Bethlehem-Hingham Shipyard, Inc., Hingham, Massachusetts
- Laid down: 15 January 1944
- Launched: 15 February 1944
- Sponsored by: Mrs. Ralph W. Myers
- Commissioned: 26 March 1945
- Decommissioned: 13 January 1947
- Reclassified: From destroyer escort (DE-595) to high-speed transport (APD-105) 17 July 1944
- Stricken: 1 June 1960
- Fate: Sold to Colombia for use as a floating power station
- Notes: Laid down as Rudderow-class destroyer escort USS Myers (DE-595)

General characteristics
- Class & type: Crosley-class high speed transport
- Displacement: 2,130 long tons (2,164 t) full
- Length: 306 ft (93 m)
- Beam: 37 ft (11 m)
- Draft: 12 ft 7 in (3.84 m)
- Speed: 23 knots (43 km/h; 26 mph)
- Troops: 162
- Complement: 204
- Armament: 1 × 5 in (130 mm) gun; 6 × 40 mm guns; 6 × 20 mm guns; 2 × depth charge tracks

USS Myers (APD-105), ex-DE-595, was a United States Navy high-speed transport in commission from 1945 to 1947.

== Namesake ==
Merton Bernell Myers was born 15 January 1921 in Long Island City, New York. He enlisted in the Navy 23 August 1939 at Indianapolis, Indiana. As machinist's mate first class, he was serving on USS Eberle when on 10 March 1943 his ship intercepted German blockade runner Karin in the South Atlantic. Myers volunteered for the boarding party which tried to save Karin from demolition charges set by her crew. All efforts were to no avail; after helping his shipmates to escape the sinking ship, Myers was killed in an explosion. He was posthumously awarded the Silver Star.

== Construction and commissioning ==
Myers was laid down as the Rudderow-class destroyer escort USS Myers (DE-595) on 15 January 1944 by Bethlehem-Hingham Shipyard, Inc., at Hingham, Massachusetts, and was launched on 15 February 1944, sponsored by Mrs. Ralph W. Myers, the mother of the ship's namesake, Machinist's Mate First Class Merton B. Myers. The ship was reclassified as a Crosley-class high-speed transport and redesignated APD-105 on 17 July 1944. After conversion to her new role, she was commissioned on 26 March 1945.

== Service history ==
After shakedown off Cuba, Myers moved to Norfolk, Virginia, where she trained officers and men assigned to new high-speed transports. After a period of refresher training in the Caribbean, she proceeded to Newport, Rhode Island, to train prospective crews for new aircraft carriers and cruisers. She operated along the United States East Coast for the rest of her active career.

== Decommissioning and disposal ==
Myers was decommissioned on 13 January 1947 and entered the Atlantic Reserve Fleet at Green Cove Springs, Florida. She was struck from the Naval Vessel Register on 1 June 1960 and subsequently sold to the government of Colombia for use as a floating power plant.
