= USS Hunter Marshall =

History

United States
- Name: USS Hunter Marshall
- Namesake: Ensign Hunter Marshall III (1917-1942), a U.S. Navy officer and Silver Star recipient
- Builder: Bethlehem-Hingham Shipyard, Inc., Hingham, Massachusetts
- Launched: 5 May 1945
- Sponsored by: Mrs. Hunter Marshall
- Commissioned: 17 July 1945
- Decommissioned: 30 May 1946
- Reclassified: From destroyer escort (DE-602) to high-speed transport (APD-112) while under construction
- Stricken: 1 June 1960
- Fate: Sold to Ecuador July 1961 for use as floating power plant
- Notes: Laid down as Rudderow-class destroyer escort USS Hunter Marshall (DE-602)

General characteristics
- Class & type: Crosley-class high speed transport
- Displacement: 2,130 long tons (2,164 t) full
- Length: 306 ft (93 m)
- Beam: 37 ft (11 m)
- Draft: 12 ft 7 in (3.84 m)
- Speed: 23 knots (43 km/h; 26 mph)
- Troops: 162
- Complement: 204
- Armament: 1 × 5 in (130 mm) gun; 6 × 40 mm guns; 6 × 20 mm guns; 2 × depth charge tracks

USS Hunter Marshall (APD-112), ex-DE-602, was a United States Navy high-speed transport in commission from 1945 to 1946.

== Namesake ==
Hunter Marshall III was born on 6 October 1917 in Charlotte, North Carolina. He enlisted in the United States Naval Reserve on 12 July 1941. Called to active duty in September 1941, Marshall was appointed midshipman and attended Midshipman's School at New York City. He later attended Naval Armed Guard School and in April 1942 reported to United States Army Transport USAT Merrimack and took command of her Naval Armed Guard detachment.

Carrying military supplies to the Panama Canal Zone, Merrimack was torpedoed by the German submarine U-68 in the Caribbean south of the Yucatán Channel on 9 June 1942. Despite the danger of further attacks, Ensign Marshall led his Armed Guard gun crews in resistance to the submarine until the forward part of the sinking Merrimack was actually awash. Marshall was one of the last to leave the ship and was lost. He was listed as presumed dead on 10 June 1943. He was posthumously awarded the Silver Star.

== Construction and commissioning ==
Hunter Marshall was laid down as the Rudderow-class destroyer escort USS Hunter Marshall (DE-602) by Bethlehem-Hingham Shipyard, Inc., at Hingham, Massachusetts. She was reclassified as a Crosley-class high-speed transport and redesignated APD-112 during construction, and was launched on 5 May 1945, sponsored by Mrs. Hunter Marshall, mother of the ship's namesake, Ensign Hunter Marshall III. Hunter Marshall was commissioned on 17 July 1945.

== Service history ==
Hunter Marshall got underway from Boston, Massachusetts, on 3 August 1945 to conduct shakedown training in Caribbean waters. Before she could complete this training, the surrender of Japan on 15 August 1945 ended World War II.

Hunter Marshall arrived at Norfolk, Virginia, on 5 September 1945 and remained there until 10 October 1945, when she joined other fleet units at Boston for a triumphant Navy Day Presidential Review.

After calling at Norfolk, Hunter Marshall arrived at Green Cove Springs, Florida, on 25 November 1945 for inactivation.

== Decommissioning and disposal ==
Hunter Marshall was decommissioned at Green Cove Springs on 30 May 1946 and berthed there with the Florida Group of the Atlantic Reserve Fleet. She was stricken from the Navy List on 1 June 1960 and sold to the government of Ecuador in July 1961 for use as a floating power plant.
