= USS Gosselin =

Crosley-class high speed transport of the United States Navy

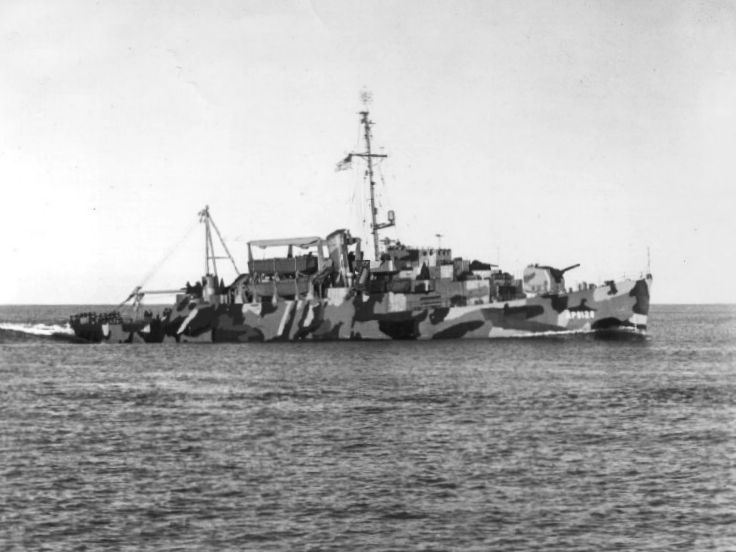

History

United States
- Name: USS Gosselin
- Namesake: Edward W. Gosselin
- Ordered: 1942
- Builder: Defoe Shipbuilding Company, Bay City, Michigan
- Laid down: 1944
- Launched: 17 February 1944
- Commissioned: 31 December 1944
- Decommissioned: 11 July 1949
- Stricken: 1 April 1964
- Honors and awards: 1 battle star (World War II)
- Fate: Sold for scrap 23 March 1965

General characteristics
- Class & type: Rudderow-class destroyer escort / Crosley-class high speed transport
- Displacement: 1,450 long tons (1,473 t)
- Length: 306 ft (93 m)
- Beam: 36 ft 10 in (11.23 m)
- Draft: 13 ft 6 in (4.11 m)
- Propulsion: 2 × Combustion Engineering DR boilers; Turbo-electric drive with 2 × General Electric steam turbines; 2 × solid manganese-bronze 3600 lb. 3-bladed propellers, 8 ft 6 in (2.59 m), 7 ft 7 in (2.31 m) pitch; 12,000 hp (8.9 MW); 2 rudders; 359 tons fuel oil
- Speed: 23 knots (43 km/h; 26 mph)
- Range: 3,700 nmi (6,900 km) at 15 kn (28 km/h; 17 mph); 6,000 nmi (11,000 km) at 12 kn (22 km/h; 14 mph)
- Boats & landing craft carried: 4 × LCVPs
- Troops: 162 troops
- Complement: 204 (12 officers, 192 enlisted)
- Armament: 1 × 5 in (130 mm) gun; 6 × 40 mm guns; 6 × 20 mm guns; 2 × depth charge tracks

USS Gosselin (APD-126) was a Crosley-class high speed transport of the United States Navy, in service from 1944 to 1949. She was sold for scrap in 1965.

== Namesake ==
Edward Webb Gosselin was born on 1 May 1917 at Hamden, Connecticut. He was educated at Yale University. He enlisted as an apprentice seaman on 30 September 1940 and was commissioned on 14 March 1941. Ensign Gosselin's first duty station was on board the battleship USS Arizona and he reported on board on 3 May 1941 as an engineer. When Arizona was sunk on 7 December 1941 during the Attack on Pearl Harbor, he was officially declared dead as of that date.

== History ==
Gosselin was laid down at the Defoe Shipbuilding Company, Bay City, Michigan and partially completed as a Rudderow-class destroyer escort with the hull number DE-710. Gosselin was launched on 17 February 1944, sponsored by Mrs. E. N. Gosselin, mother of Ensign Gosselin. On 17 July 1944, the Navy decided that Gosselin would be completed as a Crosley-class high speed transport, with the designation APD-126. Since she was so near to completion, Defoe completed her as a destroyer escort, and then when she reached New Orleans prior to commissioning, she was converted in a shipyard to the APD configuration. She was commissioned on 31 December 1944.

=== Service history ===
==== Pacific War, 1945 ====
After shakedown in Bermuda and Chesapeake Bay waters, Gosselin left Norfolk on 16 February 1945 bound for the Pacific via the Panama Canal. Stopping at Pearl Harbor, Eniwetok, and Ulithi, she arrived on 6 April in the Okinawa area, where she was employed as a screen vessel until 10 April. Gosselin then began convoy duty which took her to Guam and Saipan, returning to Okinawa on 27 April.

From 27 April until the end of May, Gosselin was assigned at an Okinawa radar picket station protecting the invasion area, shooting down one Japanese plane, taking several others under fire, and rescuing a number of survivors and casualties from ships hit by suicide planes.

From 1 June, Gosselin went to the Philippines for upkeep and maintenance work, mostly in the Leyte Gulf area, returning to Okinawa on 17 July to form part of the reduced screen still being maintained. Gosselin departed Okinawa on 17 August 1945 in company with sister ship Reeves (APD-52) to rendezvous with the 3rd Fleet, then cruising south of Honshū. Joining the fleet, she was assigned to carry part of a Naval Assault Battalion for the occupation of Yokosuka Naval Base. Later, this assignment was changed to duty carrying press representatives and Navy photographers during the initial entrance into Sagami Wan and Tokyo Bay. Gosselin one of the first group of ships, including the battleships Missouri (BB-63) (with Admiral William F. Halsey on board), Iowa (BB-61) (with Rear Admiral Oscar C. Badger), and HMS Duke of York (with Admiral Sir Bruce Fraser, RN) to enter Sagami Wan on 27 August. The next day, she accompanied the light cruiser San Diego (CL-53) into Tokyo Bay to begin the official occupation. On 2 September, Gosselin carried the press and photographers to and from the Missouri for the surrender ceremonies.

==== Post-war operations, 1945–1949 ====
Gosselin was transferred on 29 August to the task group commanded by Commodore R. W. Simpson, USN, assigned to liberate and evacuate prisoners of war. That same day, her boats were sent first to reach Omori Prison Camp, from which the first prisoners were evacuated, and brought out the first boatloads of prisoners. On 27 September 1945, Gosselin was berthed in front of the Port Director's office, Yokosuka, and used as a barracks ship for shore-based and transient personnel. She remained there until 15 December when she got underway for San Francisco via Eniwetok and Pearl Harbor. Gosselin discharged her passengers at San Francisco on 28 December.

Gosselin remained in the United States until 22 August 1946 when she left San Diego with Navy and Marine replacements bound for Yokosuka via Pearl Harbor and Eniwetok. Discharging her passengers at Yokosuka on 13 December, Gosselin returned to San Diego on 16 November 1946. She operated out of there until 16 July 1948, when she departed again for the Orient. Arriving at Tsingtao, China, on 14 August 1948, Gosselin made this her base of operations. She visited such ports as Shanghai and Nanking, and occasionally operated in the Yangtze River during American efforts to stabilize the situation in China. Gosselin departed Shanghai on 18 February 1949 and reached San Diego on 11 March.

==== Decommissioning and sale ====
Gosselin was decommissioned at San Diego on 11 July 1949, and was placed out of commission in reserve. She was berthed with the San Diego Group, Pacific Reserve Fleet, until struck from the Navy List on 1 April 1964 and sold for scrapping.

== Awards ==
Gosselin received one battle star for World War II service.
