= USS Truxtun (APD-98) =

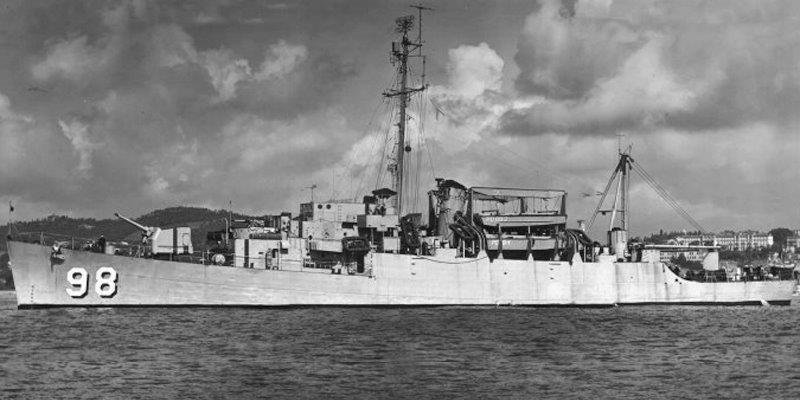

History

United States
- Name: USS Truxtun (DE-282)
- Namesake: Thomas Truxtun
- Builder: Charleston Navy Yard
- Laid down: 13 December 1943 as Rudderow-class destroyer escort
- Launched: 9 March 1944
- Sponsored by: Miss Norton Truxtun
- Reclassified: APD-98, 15 July 1944
- Commissioned: 9 July 1945
- Decommissioned: 15 March 1946
- Renamed: USS APD-98 24 June 1963
- Stricken: 15 January 1966
- Fate: Sold to Republic of China, 22 November 1965

History

Taiwan
- Name: ROCS Fu Shan (Chinese: 福山; DE-35)
- Acquired: 22 November 1965
- Reclassified: PF-35
- Reclassified: PF-838
- Reclassified: PF-835
- Stricken: 1996
- Fate: Scrapped, in the late 1990s

General characteristics
- Class & type: Crosley-class high speed transport
- Displacement: 2,130 long tons (2,164 t) full
- Length: 306 ft (93 m)
- Beam: 37 ft (11 m)
- Draft: 12 ft 7 in (3.84 m)
- Speed: 23 knots (43 km/h; 26 mph)
- Troops: 162
- Complement: 204
- Armament: 1 × 5 in (130 mm) gun; 6 × 40 mm guns; 6 × 20 mm guns; 2 × depth charge tracks

USS Truxtun (APD-98) was a Crosley-class high-speed transport commissioned in the United States Navy from 1945 to 1946. In 1965, she was transferred to the Republic of China Navy and served as ROCS Fu Shan (PF-35) until 1996. Afterwards, she was scrapped.

== History ==
=== Construction and commissioning ===
Truxtun was laid down as the Rudderow-class destroyer escort USS Truxtun (DE-282) on 13 December 1943 by the Charleston Navy Yard and was launched on 9 March 1944, sponsored by Miss Norton Truxtun. The ship was reclassified as a Crosley-class high-speed transport and redesignated APD-98 on 15 July 1944. After conversion to her new role, she was commissioned on 9 July 1945.

==== U.S. Navy (1945-1946) ====
Truxtun departed Charleston on 24 July 1945 for shakedown training in the vicinity of Guantanamo Bay, Cuba, until 25 August 1945, ten days after the end of World War II. On 28 August 1945, she entered Norfolk, Virginia, for post-shakedown shipyard availability. On 10 September 1945, she cleared Hampton Roads, Virginia, for a two-week, round-trip voyage to Miami, Florida.

Returning to Norfolk late in September 1945, Truxtun prepared for inactivation. On 9 November 1945, she again headed for Florida, this time bound for the Atlantic Reserve Fleet berthing area at Green Cove Springs, Florida. Arriving there on 16 November 1945, she completed preparations for inactivation.

Truxtun was decommissioned on 15 March 1946. She spent the remainder of her U.S. Navy career in reserve at Green Cove Springs until 1961, then at Orange, Texas.

On 24 June 1963, Truxtun's name was cancelled in order that it might be assigned to the new guided-missile frigate USS Truxtun (DLGN-35). For the 18 months remaining in her U.S. Navy career, she was identified simply as USS APD-98. On 22 November 1965, APD-98 was sold to the Republic of China under the provisions of the Military Assistance Program. Two months after the sale, on 15 January 1966, APD-98 was stricken from the Navy List.

==== Republic of China Navy (1965-1996) ====
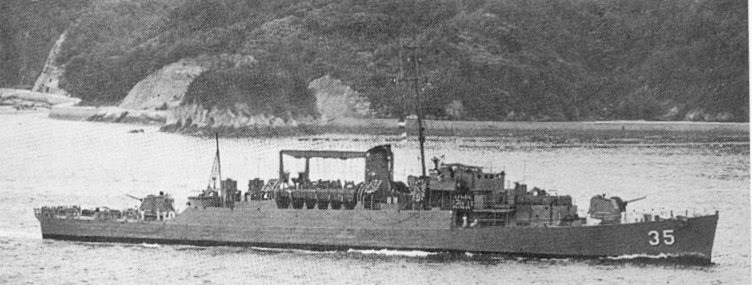
Truxtun as ROCS Fu Shan (PF-35).

The ship served in the Republic of China Navy as the frigate ROCS Fu Shan (PF-35) and received a second 5" gun aft as well as (in 1983) a Sea Chaparral surface-to-air missile launcher in place of her landing craft davits. Fu Shan had most of her armaments removed for other uses by 1988 and was reverted to a fast transport (LPR-835; her landing craft davits were also reinstated) in 1996. She was stricken and scrapped shortly afterwards.
