= USS Rogers Blood (APD-115) =

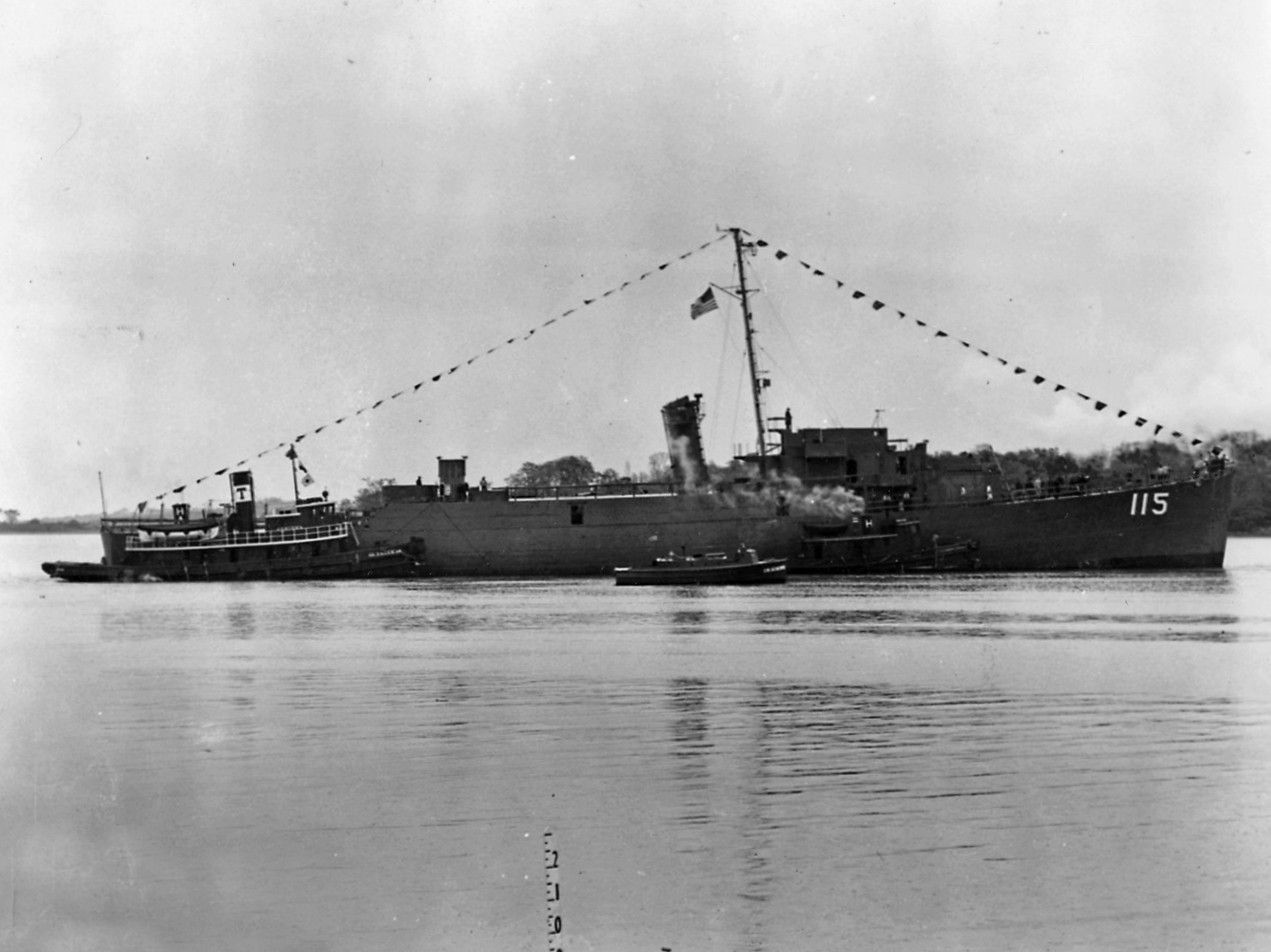
- Rogers Blood after launching at the Bethlehem Hingham Shipyard, Hingham, Massachusetts, 2 June 1945

History

United States
- Name: Rogers Blood
- Namesake: First Lieutenant Rogers Blood (1922-1944), a U.S. Marine Corps Silver Star recipient
- Builder: Bethlehem-Hingham Shipyard, Hingham, Massachusetts
- Laid down: 12 April 1945
- Launched: 2 June 1945
- Sponsored by: Mrs. Robert M. Blood
- Commissioned: 22 August 1945
- Decommissioned: 19 March 1946
- Reclassified: From destroyer escort DE-605 to fast transport APD-116 17 July 1945
- Stricken: 1 June 1960
- Fate: Sold for scrapping 14 December 1961

General characteristics
- Class & type: Crosley-class high-speed transport
- Displacement: 1,400 tons
- Length: 306 ft (93 m)
- Beam: 37 ft (11 m)
- Draft: 12 ft 7 in (4 m)
- Installed power: 12,000 shaft horsepower (16 megawatts)
- Propulsion: 2 × Foster Wheeler DR boilers; 2 × General Electric turbines, (turbo-electric drive); 2 shafts
- Speed: 23.6 knots (27.2 mph; 43.7 km/h) (trial)
- Range: 6,000 nautical miles (11,112 kilometers) at 12 knots (22.25 kilometers per hour)
- Boats & landing craft carried: 4 LCVPs
- Capacity: Six 1/4-ton trucks, two 1-ton trucks, four ammunition carts, four pack howitzers, 6,000 cubic feet (170 m^{3}) ammunition, 3,500 cubic feet (99 m^{3}) cargo, 1,000 cubic feet (28 m^{3}) gasoline (petrol)
- Troops: 12 officers, 150 enlisted men
- Complement: 12-15 officers; 189-192 enlisted men
- Armament: 1 × 5"/38 dual-purpose gun mount; 3 × twin 40 mm gun mounts; 6 × single 20 mm gun mounts; 2 × depth charge tracks

USS Rogers Blood (APD-115), ex-DE-605, was a United States Navy Crosley-class high speed transport in commission from 1945 to 1946.

== Namesake ==
Rogers Blood was born at Manchester, New Hampshire on 29 January 1922. He attended Manchester Central High School in Manchester and was awarded the Rotary Cup in his senior year as the most outstanding student in his class. Rogers then entered Dartmouth College in Hanover, New Hampshire, as a member of the Class of 1944. He left Dartmouth and enlisted in the United States Marine Corps Reserve on 3 January 1942. He accepted a commission as second lieutenant on 13 January 1943, and was promoted to first lieutenant on 1 February 1944. He served at the Marine Barracks at Marine Corps Base Quantico, Virginia, and at Camp Lejeune, North Carolina. From 21 May 1943, he served in the World War II Pacific Theater of Operations.

On 18 February 1944 Blood was serving in the 22nd Marine Regiment when it landed on Engebi Island as part of the invasion of Eniwetok Atoll. While leading his platoon in a charge across open terrain in the face of severe Japanese machine-gun, mortar, and rifle fire to dislodge the heavily entrenched Japanese, he was killed in action. He was posthumously awarded the Silver Star and the Purple Heart.

== Construction and commissioning ==
Originally, Rogers Blood was planned to be the Rudderow-class destroyer escort USS Rogers Blood (DE-605), and was laid down as such on 12 April 1945 by Bethlehem-Hingham Shipyard at Hingham, Massachusetts. She was launched on 2 June 1945, sponsored by Mrs. Robert M. Blood. Rogers Blood was re-classified as a Crosley-class fast transport and redesignated USS Rogers Blood (APD-115) on 17 July 1945. She was commissioned on 22 August 1945.

== Service history ==
On 8 September 1945, Rogers Blood departed Boston, Massachusetts, for Guantanamo Bay, Cuba, where she completed a six-week shakedown cruise, and was then ordered to Chester, Pennsylvania, to participate with the submarine USS Sabalo (SS-302) in Navy Day ceremonies which brought approximately 40,000 persons as visitors. She was in the Norfolk Navy Yard at Portsmouth, Virginia, from 31 October 1945 to 15 November 1945, then moved to Jacksonville, Florida, where she reported to the Atlantic Reserve Fleet. On 18 November 1945 she arrived at the St. Johns River in Florida for lay-up.

== Decommissioning and disposal ==
Rogers Blood was decommissioned and placed in reserve on 19 March 1946 and berthed at Green Cove Springs, Florida, where she remained until stricken from the Navy List on 1 June 1960. She was sold on 14 December 1961 to the Southern Scrap Material Company of Louisiana for scrapping.
