= USS Balduck =

Amphibious warfare vessel

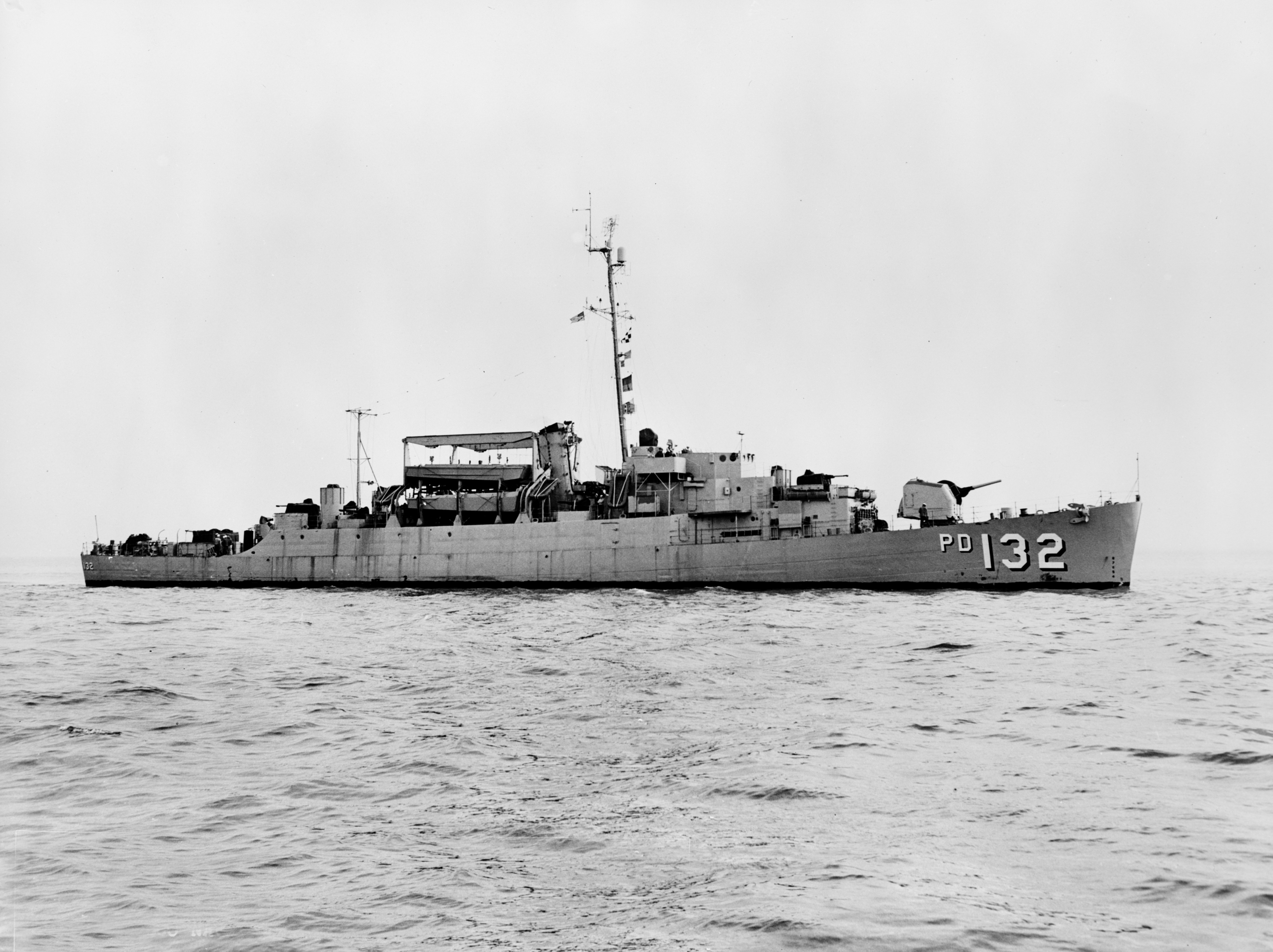
- USS Balduck (APD-132) on 23 March 1954

History

United States
- Name: USS Balduck
- Namesake: Remi A. Balduck
- Builder: Defoe Shipbuilding Company, Bay City, Michigan
- Laid down: 17 June 1944
- Launched: 27 October 1944
- Commissioned: 7 May 1945
- Decommissioned: 31 May 1946
- Recommissioned: 5 November 1953
- Decommissioned: 28 February 1958
- Reclassified: LPR-132, 1 January 1969
- Stricken: 15 July 1975
- Fate: Sold for scrap, 1 December 1976

General characteristics
- Class & type: Crosley-class high speed transport
- Displacement: 1,450 long tons (1,473 t)
- Length: 306 ft (93 m)
- Beam: 36 ft 10 in (11.23 m)
- Draft: 13 ft 6 in (4.11 m)
- Propulsion: 2 × Combustion Engineering DR boilers; Turbo-electric drive with 2 × General Electric steam turbines; 2 × solid manganese-bronze 3600 lb. 3-bladed propellers, 8 ft 6 in (2.59 m), 7 ft 7 in (2.31 m) pitch; 12,000 hp (8.9 MW); 2 rudders; 359 tons fuel oil
- Speed: 23 knots (43 km/h; 26 mph)
- Range: 3,700 nmi (6,900 km) at 15 kn (28 km/h; 17 mph); 6,000 nmi (11,000 km) at 12 kn (22 km/h; 14 mph)
- Boats & landing craft carried: 4 × LCVPs
- Troops: 162 troops
- Complement: 204 (12 officers, 192 enlisted)
- Armament: 1 × 5"/38 caliber gun; 3 × twin 40 mm guns; 6 × single 20 mm guns; 2 × depth charge tracks

USS Balduck (APD-132) was a Crosley-class high speed transport of the United States Navy, named after Marine Corporal Remi A. Balduck (1918–1942), who was killed during the Battle of Guadalcanal. For his actions he was posthumously awarded the Navy Cross.

== Namesake ==
Remi August Balduck was born on 30 March 1918 in Detroit, Michigan. He enlisted in the Marine Corps at Detroit on 4 September 1940 and commenced recruit training at Parris Island, S.C., two days later. Assigned to the Marine Barracks at the Naval Operating Base, Norfolk, Va., on 3 November 1940, he received promotion to private, 1st class, on 13 June 1941. Reassigned to the Marine Barracks at New River, N.C., on 28 September 1941, Balduck was ultimately assigned to the 7th Marine Regiment, 1st Marine Division and sailed for the South Pacific on 8 May 1942.

Promoted to corporal on 6 June 1942, Balduck landed with the 7th Marines on Guadalcanal on 18 September 1942 as that regiment reinforced Marine Corps units already there in the struggle for the island. Assigned to Company "G," 2d Battalion, he took part in one of the short, sharp encounters with the Japanese near Koli Point, 5 miles (8.0 km) east of Lunga. On 9 November 1942, although normally a squad leader, Balduck spearheaded his platoon in a frontal assault on a Japanese position, and suffered a fatal wound just as he threw a hand grenade at the enemy. For his actions Balduck was awarded the Navy Cross posthumously.

== Commissioning ==
Balduck's keel was laid down on 17 June 1944 at the Defoe Shipbuilding Company in Bay City, Michigan as a Rudderow-class destroyer escort, designated DE-716. She was re-designated as APD-132, a fast transport, on 17 July 1944, and launched on 27 October 1944, sponsored by Mrs. Mary Verhougstraete, mother of Corporal Balduck. Builders trials before her pre-commissioning cruise were done in Lake Huron.

After completion, Balduck sailed from the builder's yard at Bay City to Chicago, Illinois. From there, they went through the Chicago Sanitary and Ship Canal and down the Chicago River to Joliet, Illinois, where pontoons were attached to the ship so it could be pushed down the Des Plaines River, Illinois River, and Mississippi River as part of a barge train. After arriving at the Todd Johnson Shipyard in Algiers, Louisiana, on the west bank of the Mississippi at New Orleans, the rest of the crew reported aboard, and Balduck was commissioned at New Orleans on 7 May 1945.

== Service history ==
=== 1945–1946 ===
As an APD, her primary role was to land raiding parties on enemy beaches and Underwater Demolition Team (UDT) personnel on beach obstacle clearance operations. APDs also retained the sound gear and some anti-submarine weapons of destroyer escorts, and served as escorts to amphibious groups. Because they could take on extra personnel, they were often designated as rescue ships if a transport went down.

Departing Oceanside, California, on 16 August 1945, Balduck steamed to Okinawa, arriving there on 3 September. She participated in the occupation of Korea and Tsingtao, China, until 12 October 1945. She departed on 19 October for San Diego, arriving there on 7 November. As a member of Transport Division 112, she conducted five voyages between San Diego and San Pedro, Los Angeles, carrying personnel, before commencing her pre-inactivation overhaul. She went out of commission in reserve at San Diego on 31 May 1946.

=== 1953–1958 ===
Balduck was recommissioned on 5 November 1953, and assigned to Amphibious Control Division 12. Between 8 December 1953 and 25 March 1954, she was at San Francisco Naval Shipyard undergoing repairs and overhaul. Upon return to San Diego, Balduck joined Amphibious Control Division 11. She exercised in the area with Underwater Demolition Teams and on anti-submarine warfare training.

On 1 September 1954, Balduck departed San Diego and steamed to Yokosuka, Japan, reporting to Amphibious Transport Division 31. She arrived on 14 October 1954 at Hai Phong, Indochina, and assisted in the evacuation of Vietnamese. She then steamed to the Tachen Islands, arriving there on 9 February 1955, where she operated with units of Task Force 77 during the evacuation of Nationalist Chinese soldiers and civilians. Between 1 March and 17 March, Balduck steamed with a task unit between Yokosuka and San Diego. Following repairs, she operated out of San Diego on anti-submarine, amphibious, and air defense training exercises.

Arriving at Yokosuka, Japan, on 15 September 1955, Balduck cruised in Japanese and Philippine waters, and participated in amphibious landing exercises until returning to San Diego on 23 March 1956.

=== Decommissioning and sale ===
Balduck was decommissioned on 28 February 1958. While in reserve, her designation changed to Amphibious Transport, Small, LPR-132, on 1 January 1969. She was struck from the Naval Vessel Register on 15 July 1975 and sold for scrapping, 6 December 1976, for $60,000, to National Metal and Steel Corp., Terminal Island, California.
