= USS Bray =

American naval ship

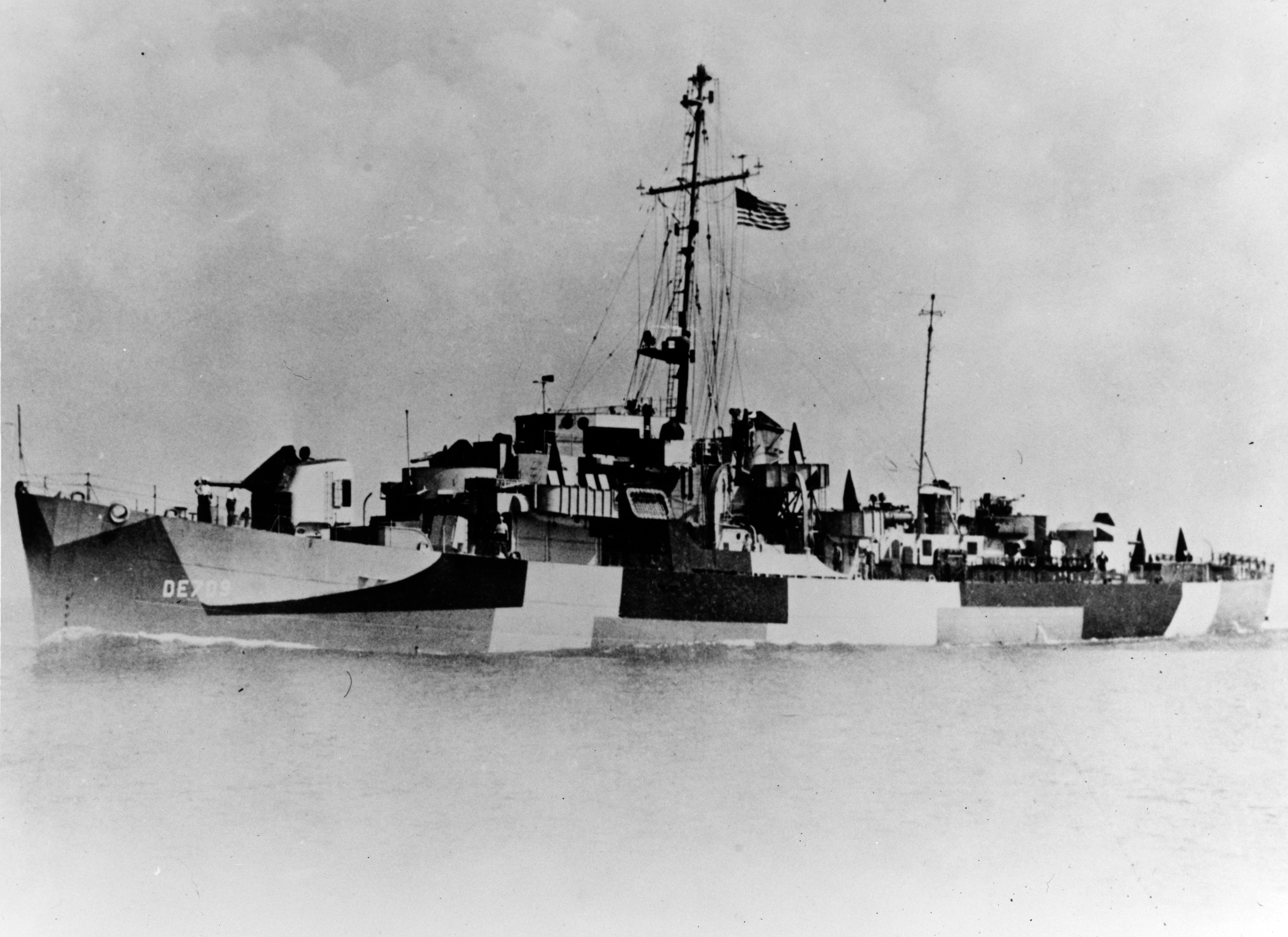

History

United States
- Name: USS Bray
- Namesake: Raymond Leon Bray
- Ordered: 1942
- Builder: Defoe Shipbuilding Company, Bay City, Michigan
- Laid down: January 1944
- Launched: 15 April 1944
- Sponsored by: Mrs. Mattie M. Bray
- Commissioned: 4 September 1944
- Reclassified: APD-139, 16 July 1945
- Decommissioned: 10 May 1946
- Stricken: 1 June 1960
- Fate: Sunk as target, 27 March 1963

General characteristics
- Class & type: Crosley-class high speed transport
- Displacement: 1,450 long tons (1,473 t) light; 1,673 long tons (1,700 t) standard
- Length: 306 ft (93 m)
- Beam: 37 ft (11 m)
- Draft: 13 ft 8 in (4.17 m)
- Propulsion: Turbo-electric drive, 12,000 hp (8.9 MW)
- Speed: 24 knots (44 km/h; 28 mph)
- Complement: 221
- Armament: 2 × single 5"/38 caliber guns; 2 × twin 40 mm guns; 10 × single 20 mm guns; 3 × 21 inch (533 mm) torpedo tubes; 1 × Hedgehog anti-submarine mortar; 8 × depth charge projectors; 2 × depth charge tracks

USS Bray (DE-709) was a Rudderow-class destroyer escort in service with the United States Navy from 1944 to 1946. She was sunk as a target in 1963.

== Namesake ==
Raymond Leon Bray was born on 1 April 1918 in Greenville, Texas. He enlisted in the United States Marine Corps in 1940 and after recruit training at San Diego, California, was assigned to the Marine Detachment at the Naval Air Station, Lakehurst, New Jersey. Late in July 1942, Bray, now a corporal, joined the 1st Parachute Battalion, 1st Marine Division.

On 7 August 1942, the 1st Parachute Battalion went ashore in landing craft on the island of Gavutu, Solomon Islands. The first wave, Company "A", reached shore unhindered but the Japanese defenders then opened heavy machinegun fire. Companies "B" (to which Bray was attached) and "C" came under heavy fire while still in the boats. The leading wave pushed forward and secured a small beachhead, but was pinned down by intense fire from prepared positions. Company "B" pushed toward the left to gain Hill 148, from which much of the enemy fire came, and took it by late afternoon. Bray attacked a fortified machinegun emplacement that blocked the Marines' advance. Charging alone, he moved through the opening of the position and engaged the Japanese in hand-to-hand combat. Other Marines rushed to support him and soon overcame the opposition. Bray, however, died as a result of a grenade explosion later that same day. He was posthumously awarded the Navy Cross.

== History ==
Bray was launched on 15 April 1944 by the Defoe Shipbuilding Company in Bay City, Michigan, sponsored by Mrs. Mattie M. Bray, mother of Corporal Bray; and commissioned on 4 September 1944.

Bray was assigned to Escort Division 12, United States Atlantic Fleet, and during late 1944, participated in anti-submarine operations off Long Island, and conducted exercises with American submarines. Following repairs at the Boston Navy Yard as a result of a collision with the submarine Cuttlefish (SS-171) on 8 December, Bray reported to Norfolk, Virginia, early in 1945, and conducted training for prospective destroyer and destroyer escort crews. She later trained with submarine crews off New London, Connecticut, until mid-July 1945. During this period, she also participated in occasional anti-submarine duty along the East coast.

On 19 March 1945 she steamed to the aid of the coastal minesweeper Heroic (AMc-84), saving her from sinking. Clad only in heavy underclothing and using a face mask breathing apparatus, Thomas John Kushnerick (Boilermaker first class, U.S.N., of Freeland, Pa.) descended four times in ice-cold water in the darkness to secure a patch over the hole in the minesweeper's hull due to a parted flange in the sea chest.

Between 15 July and 18 September 1945, Bray was at Charleston Navy Yard where she underwent conversion to a high speed transport. She was reclassified as a Crosley-class high speed transport, APD-139, on 16 July 1945. Bray later served as a training ship operating out of Miami, Florida. She arrived at Green Cove Springs, Florida, on 7 December 1945, and was assigned to the 16th Fleet. She was placed out of commission in reserve on 10 May 1946 and never returned to active service.

Bray was stricken from the Naval Vessel Register on 1 June 1960 and sunk as a target on 27 March 1963.
