= USS John Q. Roberts =

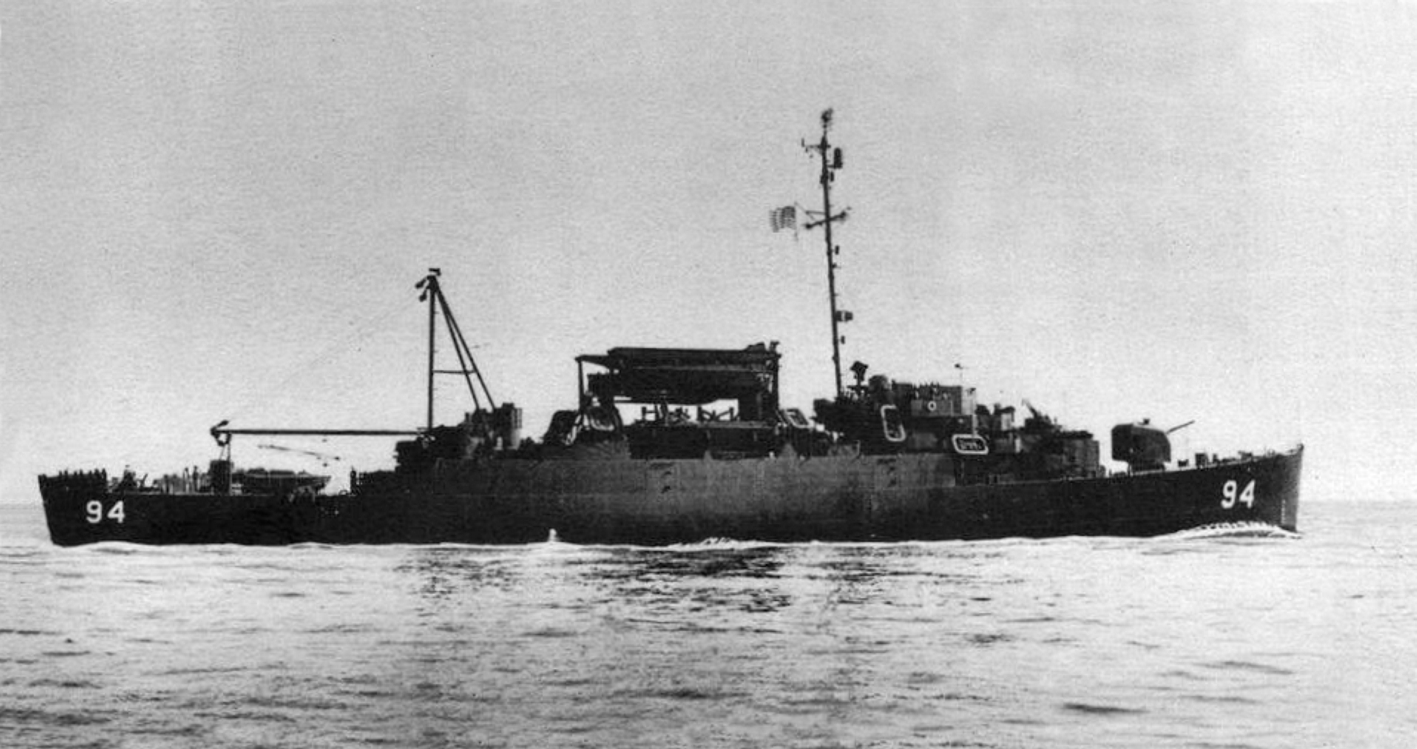

History

United States
- Name: USS John Q. Roberts
- Namesake: Ensign John Q. Roberts (1914–1942), U.S. Navy officer and Navy Cross recipient
- Builder: Charleston Navy Yard
- Laid down: 15 November 1943
- Launched: 11 February 1944
- Sponsored by: Mrs. Deany Roberts Garner
- Commissioned: 8 March 1945
- Decommissioned: 30 May 1946
- Reclassified: From destroyer escort (DE-235) to high-speed transport (APD-94) 17 June 1944
- Stricken: 1 June 1960
- Fate: Sold for scrapping on either 16 December 1960 or 29 December 1960
- Notes: Laid down as Rudderow-class destroyer escort USS John Q. Roberts (DE-235)

General characteristics
- Class & type: Crosley-class high speed transport
- Displacement: 2,130 long tons (2,164 t) full
- Length: 306 ft (93 m)
- Beam: 37 ft (11 m)
- Draft: 12 ft 7 in (3.84 m)
- Speed: 23 knots (43 km/h; 26 mph)
- Troops: 162
- Complement: 204
- Armament: 1 × 5 in (130 mm) gun; 6 × 40 mm guns; 6 × 20 mm guns; 2 × depth charge tracks

USS John Q. Roberts (APD-94), ex-DE-235, was a United States Navy high-speed transport in commission from 1945 to 1946.

== Namesake ==
John Quincy Roberts was born on 2 September 1914 in Boaz, Alabama. He enlisted in the United States Naval Reserve on 12 October 1940. After flight training, he was commissioned an ensign on 27 September 1941 and reported to Scouting Squadron 6 aboard the USS Enterprise flying the Douglas SBD Dauntless dive bomber.

On 4 June 1942 during the Battle of Midway Roberts' squadron attacked the Imperial Japanese Navy aircraft carriers despite formidable opposition. Presumed dead, he was declared missing in action on 5 June 1942. He was posthumously awarded the Navy Cross.

== Construction and commissioning ==
John Q. Roberts was laid down as the Rudderow-class destroyer escort USS John Q. Roberts (DE-235) on 15 November 1943 by the Charleston Navy Yard and launched as such on 11 February 1944, sponsored by Mrs. Deany Roberts Garner, mother of the ship's namesake. The ship was reclassified as a Crosley-class high-speed transport and redesignated APD-94 on 17 June 1944. After conversion to her new role, the ship was commissioned on 8 March 1945.

== Service history ==
=== World War II ===
Following shakedown training in the Caribbean, John Q. Roberts underwent amphibious training in Hampton Roads, Virginia, during April 1945. She then got underway from Norfolk, Virginia, to join the United States Pacific Fleet, departing on 7 May 1945. She arrived at Pearl Harbor, Territory of Hawaii, on 31 May 1945 and trained with underwater demolition team units until proceeding to Leyte Gulf in the Philippine Islands on 13 June 1945.

In the weeks that followed, John Q. Roberts escorted convoys and took part in fleet maneuvers in the Philippines preparatory to Operation Olympic, the anticipated invasion of the island of Kyūshū in Japan. World War II ended on 15 August 1945, before the invasion could occur.

=== Postwar ===
The war over, John Q. Roberts departed Leyte on 20 August 1945 to escort a convoy to Okinawa. From there she was engaged in escort duties between Okinawa and Japan. The ship was at Yokosuka, Japan, during the historic surrender ceremonies in Tokyo Bay on 2 September 1945, and remained in Japan transporting troops and administrative personnel carrying out occupation of Japan occupation duties. After embarking returnees, she departed Nagoya, Japan, on 17 December 1945 and steamed via Eniwetok and Pearl Harbor for San Pedro, California, where she arrived on 6 January 1946.

John Q. Roberts departed San Pedro on 25 January 1946 bound for Norfolk, and from there moved on to Green Cove Springs, Florida, where she arrived on 17 March 1946.

== Decommissioning and disposal ==
John Q. Roberts was decommissioned on 30 May 1946 and entered the Atlantic Reserve Fleet at Green Cove Springs. She was stricken from the Navy List on 1 June 1960 and sold for scrapping on either 16 December 1960 or 29 December 1960 to B. F. Diamond Construction Company, Inc. of Savannah, Georgia.
