= USS Walsh =

United States Navy high-speed transport

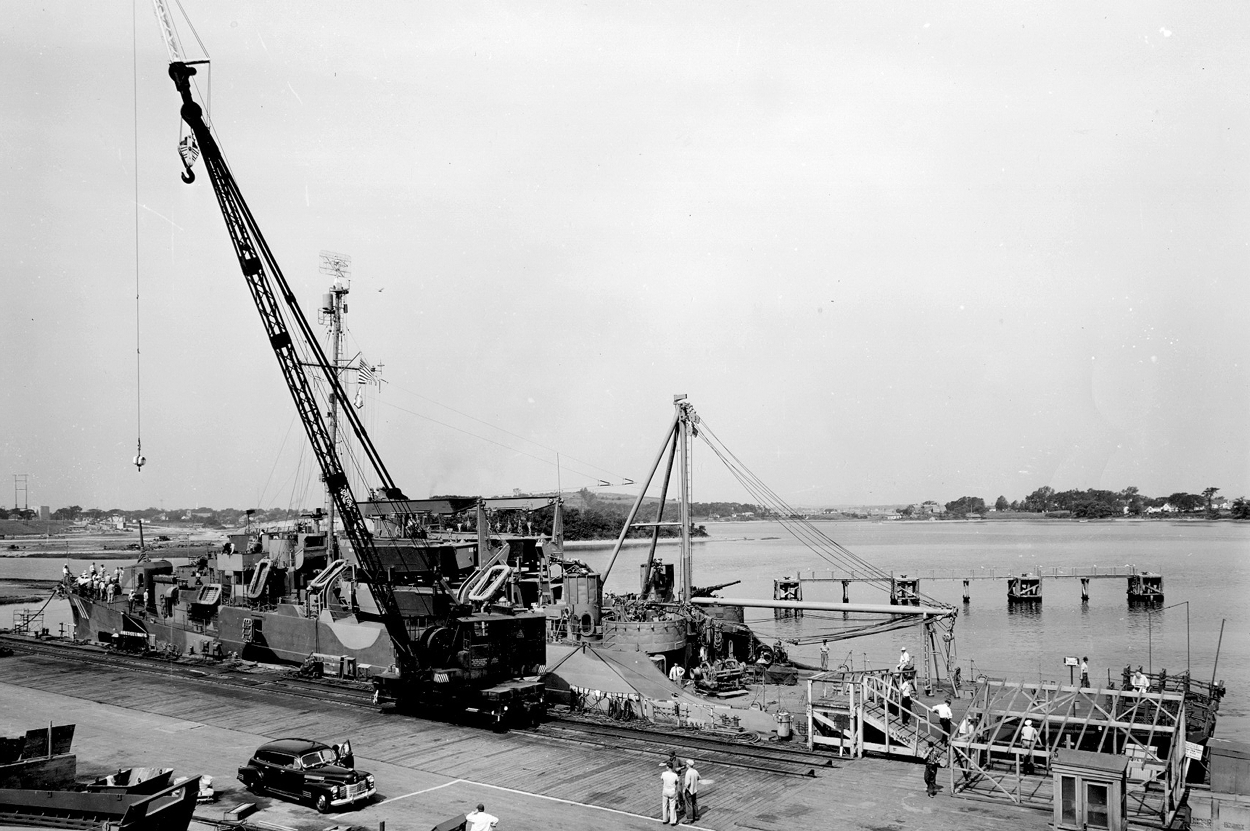

History

United States
- Name: USS Walsh
- Namesake: Lieutenant, junior grade, Patrick J. Walsh (1908-1942), a U.S. Navy officer and Silver Star recipient
- Builder: Bethlehem-Hingham Shipyard, Inc., Hingham, Massachusetts
- Laid down: 27 February 1945
- Launched: 27 April 1945
- Sponsored by: Mrs. John J. Walsh
- Commissioned: 11 July 1945
- Decommissioned: 26 April 1946
- Reclassified: From destroyer escort (DE-601) to high-speed transport (APD-111) while under construction
- Stricken: 1 May 1966
- Fate: Sold for scrapping July 1968
- Notes: Laid down as Rudderow-class destroyer escort USS Walsh (DE-601)

General characteristics
- Class & type: Crosley-class high speed transport
- Displacement: 2,130 long tons (2,164 t) full
- Length: 306 ft (93 m)
- Beam: 37 ft (11 m)
- Draft: 12 ft 7 in (3.84 m)
- Speed: 23 knots (43 km/h; 26 mph)
- Troops: 162
- Complement: 204
- Armament: 1 × 5 in (130 mm) gun; 6 × 40 mm guns; 6 × 20 mm guns; 2 × depth charge tracks

USS Walsh (APD-111) was a United States Navy Crosley-class high-speed transport in commission from 1945 to 1946. She was scrapped in 1968.

== Namesake ==
Patrick Joseph Walsh was born on 19 January 1908 in New York City. He accepted a commission in the United States Naval Reserve as a lieutenant, junior grade, on 4 May 1942. He received instruction at the Naval Training School, Boston, Massachusetts, and later received more specialized training at the Armed Guard School at Little Creek, Virginia, from 16 June 1942 to 22 July 1942.

Walsh was Naval Armed Guard detachment commander aboard the merchant ship SS Patrick J. Hurley in the North Atlantic Ocean on the night of 12 September 1942 when the German submarine U-512 stealthily surfaced and closed on the Patrick J. Hurley. Undetected, U-512 opened fire on Patrick J. Hurley with devastating effect. Walsh fell severely wounded in the initial shelling, taking shrapnel in the throat. In spite of the machine-gun fire directed at his battle station Walsh remained at his post, though weak from loss of blood. He died of his wounds. He was posthumously awarded the Silver Star and the Purple Heart.

== Construction and commissioning ==
Walsh was laid down as the Rudderow-class destroyer escort USS Walsh (DE-601) on 27 February 1945 by Bethlehem-Hingham Shipyard, Inc., at Hingham, Massachusetts. She was reclassified as a Crosley-class high-speed transport and redesignated APD-111 during construction, and was launched on 27 April 1945, sponsored by Mrs. John J. Walsh. Walsh was commissioned on 11 July 1945.

== Service history ==
After shakedown out of Guantanamo Bay, Cuba, from 1 August 1945 to 29 August 1945, during which World War II ended on 15 August 1945, Walsh visited Norfolk, Virginia, and then took part in smoke screen experiments in the Chesapeake Bay as part of Task Group 23.19. On 4 October 1945, she moved north for training exercises in company with PT boats out of Melville, Rhode Island. She later participated in Navy Day festivities at Portland, Maine, in late October 1945 before departing Portland on 30 October 1945 bound for Philadelphia, Pennsylvania, to begin the process of inactivation.

At Philadelphia, Walsh secured her sonar gear at the Philadelphia Naval Shipyard and received hull repairs. She departed Philadelphia on 13 November 1945 bound for Hampton Roads, Virginia, and arrived at Norfolk on 14 November 1945. She then unloaded all ammunition and turned in registered publications before proceeding on to Jacksonville, Florida.

== Decommissioning and disposal ==
Decommissioned on 26 April 1946 at Green Cove Springs, Florida, Walsh berthed initially with the Florida Group of the Atlantic Reserve Fleet there. Later, she was moved to the Texas Group of the Atlantic Reserve Fleet, where she remained until stricken from the Navy List on 1 May 1966. She was sold for scrapping in July 1968.
