= USS Donald W. Wolf =

United States Navy ship

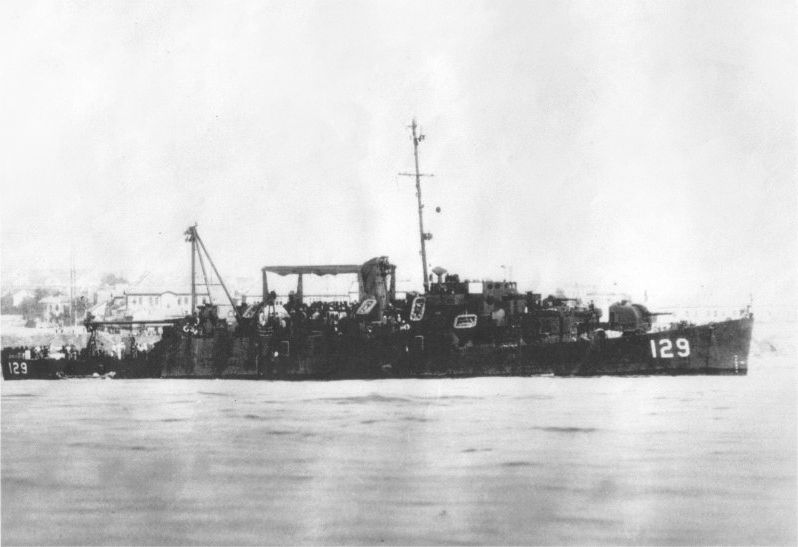

History

United States
- Name: USS Donald W. Wolf (DE-713)
- Namesake: Donald W. Wolf
- Ordered: 1942
- Builder: Defoe Shipbuilding Company, Bay City, Michigan
- Laid down: 17 April 1944 as Rudderow-class destroyer escort
- Reclassified: APD-129, 17 July 1944
- Launched: 22 July 1944
- Commissioned: 14 April 1945
- Decommissioned: 15 May 1946
- Stricken: 1 March 1965
- Fate: Transferred to the Republic of China, 3 April 1965

History

Taiwan
- Name: ROCS Hua Shan (DE-33)
- Acquired: 3 April 1965
- Reclassified: PF-33
- Reclassified: PF-854
- Reclassified: PF-833
- Decommissioned: 1995
- Fate: Scrapped

General characteristics
- Class & type: Crosley-class high speed transport
- Displacement: 1,450 long tons (1,473 t)
- Length: 306 ft (93 m)
- Beam: 36 ft 10 in (11.23 m)
- Draft: 13 ft 6 in (4.11 m)
- Propulsion: 2 × Combustion Engineering DR boilers; Turbo-electric drive with 2 × General Electric steam turbines; 2 × solid manganese-bronze 3600 lb. 3-bladed propellers, 8 ft 6 in (2.59 m), 7 ft 7 in (2.31 m) pitch; 12,000 hp (8.9 MW); 2 rudders; 359 tons fuel oil
- Speed: 23 knots (43 km/h; 26 mph)
- Range: 3,700 nmi (6,900 km) at 15 kn (28 km/h; 17 mph); 6,000 nmi (11,000 km) at 12 kn (22 km/h; 14 mph)
- Boats & landing craft carried: 4 × LCVPs
- Troops: 162 troops
- Complement: 204 (12 officers, 192 enlisted)
- Armament: 1 × 5"/38 caliber gun; 3 × twin 40 mm guns; 6 × single 20 mm guns; 2 × depth charge tracks

USS Donald W. Wolf (APD-129) was a Crosley-class high speed transport of the United States Navy, in service from 1945 to 1946. In 1965, she was transferred to the Republic of China Navy as ROCS Hua Shan (PF-33) and served until being struck and scrapped.

== Namesake ==
Donald William Wolf was born on 7 February 1919 in Hart, Michigan. He enlisted in the United States Marine Corps on 5 December 1939. On 9 October 1942 Sergeant Wolf was killed in action during the Battle of Guadalcanal at the second battle of Matanikau River. He shared in the Presidential Unit Citation awarded the 1st Marine Division and was posthumously awarded the Navy Cross for leading his platoon in hand-to-hand combat against an overwhelming enemy attacking force.

== History ==
Donald W. Wolf was laid down by the Defoe Shipbuilding Company in Bay City, Michigan as a Rudderow-class destroyer escort with the hull number DE-713. A week before launching, on 17 July 1944, it was decided that Wolf would be completed as a Crosley-class fast transport, with the designation APD-129. She was launched on 22 July 1944, sponsored by Corporal B. S. Wolf, United States Marine Corps Women's Reserve, widow of Sergeant Wolf. She was commissioned on 14 April 1945, at the Todd-Johnson Dry Dock Company of New Orleans, Louisiana.

=== U.S. Navy (1945–1946) ===
After training at Guantanamo Bay, Cuba, and overhaul at Norfolk, Virginia, Donald W. Wolf arrived at San Diego, California, on 22 June 1945 for additional training. She embarked an Underwater Demolition Team, and sailed for the western Pacific on 16 August, touching at Pearl Harbor and Eniwetok, before arrival at Buckner Bay, Okinawa, on 4 September. The next day, she got underway to land men at Jinsen for the occupation of Korea, returning to Okinawa on 18 September. A week later, she sailed for mainland China, stopping at Tientsin, Chefoo, and Tsingtao before returning to Okinawa on 20 October. Donald W. Wolf sailed the next day for the United States, debarking her passengers at San Diego on 11 November. She was placed out of commission in reserve on 15 May 1946 and laid up in the Pacific Reserve Fleet. She never saw any action in World War II, and was in commission for a little over one year.

=== Republic of China Navy (1965–1995) ===
Donald W. Wolf was transferred to the Republic of China on 3 April 1965 and served in the Republic of China Navy as ROCS Hua Shan (PF-33).

The ship was eventually struck by the Republic of China Navy in 1995 and broken up for scrap.
