= USS Register (APD-92) =

High-speed transport

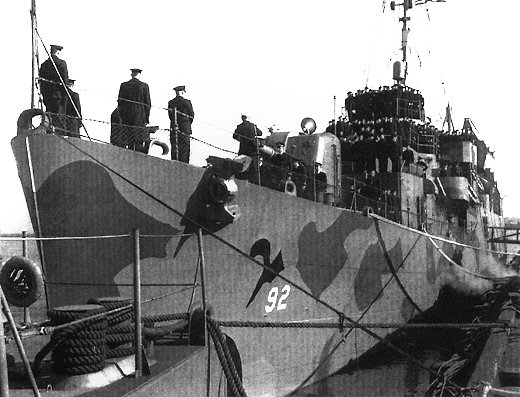
- USS Register during her commissioning ceremony at Charleston Navy Yard, on 11 January 1945

History

United States
- Name: USS Register (DE-233)
- Namesake: Paul J. Register
- Builder: Charleston Navy Yard
- Laid down: 27 October 1943 as Rudderow-class destroyer escort
- Launched: 20 January 1944
- Sponsored by: Mrs. Paul J. Register
- Reclassified: APD-92, 17 July 1944
- Commissioned: 11 January 1945
- Decommissioned: 31 March 1946
- Stricken: 1 September 1966
- Honors and awards: 1 battle star for World War II service
- Fate: Transferred to the Republic of China 1966

History

Taiwan
- Name: ROCS Tai Shan (DE-38)
- Acquired: 1966
- Reclassified: PF-38
- Reclassified: PF-878
- Reclassified: PF-838
- Stricken: scrapped, 1991

General characteristics
- Class & type: Crosley-class high speed transport
- Displacement: 2,130 long tons (2,164 t) full
- Length: 306 ft (93 m)
- Beam: 37 ft (11 m)
- Draft: 12 ft 7 in (3.84 m)
- Speed: 23 knots (43 km/h; 26 mph)
- Troops: 162
- Complement: 204
- Armament: 1 × 5 in (130 mm) gun; 6 × 40 mm guns; 6 × 20 mm guns; 2 × depth charge tracks

USS Register (APD-92), ex-DE-233, was a United States Navy high-speed transport in commission from 1945 to 1946.

== Namesake ==
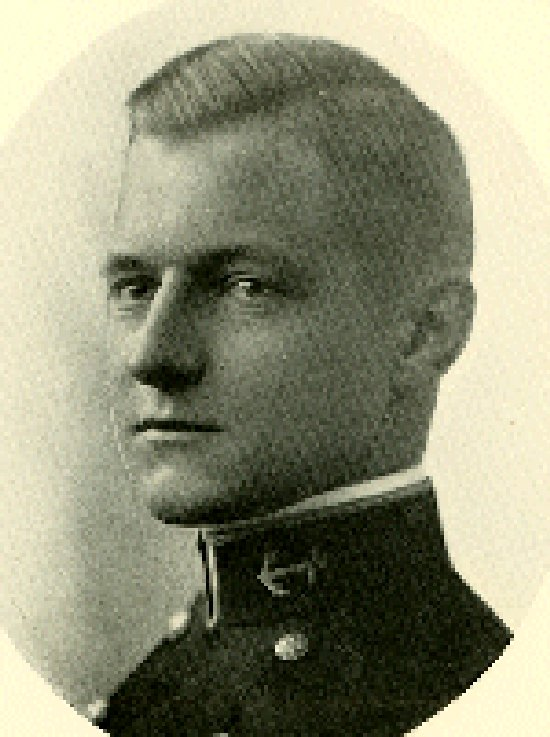
Paul J. Register as a midshipman at the United States Naval Academy, ca. 1920

Paul James Register was born on 5 November 1899 in Bismarck, North Dakota. He graduated from Bismarck High School in 1917 and from the United States Naval Academy in 1920 and was simultaneously commissioned as an ensign. He was assigned to the battleship USS Florida until 14 June 1921, when he was reassigned for engineering instruction aboard the destroyers USS Truxton, USS Shaw and USS George E. Badger. In August 1922 he was reassigned to the Commander of Destroyer Squadrons aboard the armored cruiser USS Rochester as assistant to the squadron engineer officer until April 1923.

In 1923, Register reported to Submarine Base New London at New London, Connecticut, for instruction at the Submarine School. Promoted to the rank of lieutenant, junior grade, on 5 June 1923, he received orders to the transport USS Argonne at Cavite Naval Station in the Philippine Islands for temporary duty. In December 1923 he was assigned the submarine USS S-6) and served aboard her until 30 June 1927.

He was promoted to lieutenant on 2 June 1927 just before transferring to the U.S. Naval Academy at Annapolis, Maryland, for post-graduate studies and in May 1928 attended the Naval War College at Newport, Rhode Island. He was assigned as gunnery officer aboard the battleship USS Maryland in June 1929 until he was ordered to report to the U.S. Naval Academy as an instructor in 1932. From 1932 to 1934 he served as a gunnery instructor at the Naval Academy and continued his post graduate-work in law.

In May 1935, he received orders to report to Rear Admiral Clark H. Woodward, Commander Destroyers, Battle Force Pacific, for duty as Aide-de-camp and flag lieutenant on his staff and continued to serve aboard destroyer tender USS Melville after Rear Admiral Woodward was relieved. In May 1938 he was assigned to the Navy Recruiting Bureau in New York City as a United States Naval Reserve instructor. During this assignment he continued to study law at Fordham University during evenings. He was promoted to lieutenant commander on 1 July 1939 and was assigned various postings as a Naval Reserve instructor in the State of New York.

On 20 March 1941, Register received notification for change of duty for assignment to the battleship USS Arizona as communication officer. He reported for duty aboard Arizona in May 1941. He was killed in action when Arizona was sunk during the Japanese attack on Pearl Harbor on 7 December 1941. He was awarded the Purple Heart posthumously in accordance with General Order No. 186 on 21 January 1943. The U.S. Navy destroyer escort USS Register (DE-308) was named for Lieutenant Commander Register, but was renamed USS Creamer while under construction in 1943.

== Construction and commissioning ==
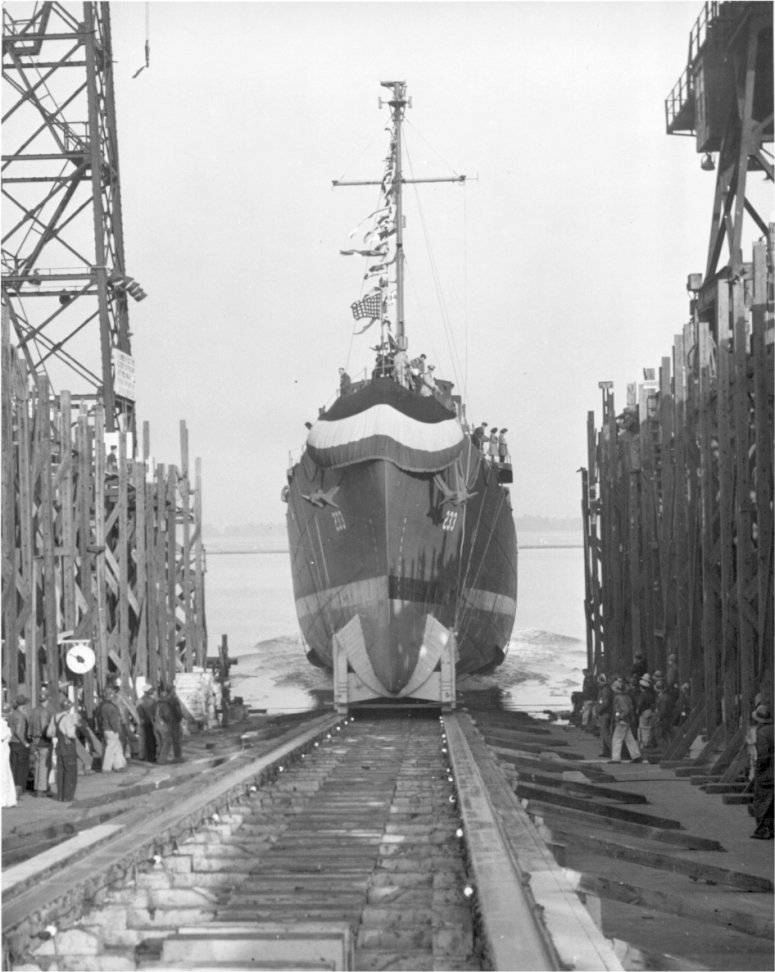
Destroyer escort USS Register (DE-233) is launched at Charleston Navy Yard, on 20 January 1944, prior to her conversion into high-speed transport USS Register (APD-92).

Register was laid down as the Rudderow-class destroyer escort USS Register (DE-233) on 27 October 1943 by the Charleston Navy Yard, and launched as such on 20 January 1944, sponsored by Mrs. Ethel L. Register, widow of the ship's namesake. The ship was reclassified as a Crosley-class high speed transport and redesignated APD-92 on 17 July 1944. After conversion to her new role, the ship was commissioned on 11 January 1945.

== Service history ==
=== World War II ===
Following shakedown in the British West Indies, Register departed the United States East Coast on 11 March 1945 and headed via the Panama Canal for San Diego, California, where she arrived on 26 March 1945. She continued on to Pearl Harbor, Territory of Hawaii, which she reached on 3 April 1945. Training with underwater demolition teams followed and on 27 April 1945 she got underway, with 100 passengers embarked, for Ulithi Atoll. Arriving there on 13 May 1945, she departed as an escort of an Okinawa-bound convoy on 15 May 1945 for service in the Okinawa campaign.

Register anchored off the Hagushi beaches at Okinawa on 19 May 1945. On 20 May 1945 she got underway for screening station Baker-13. At 19:25 hours a flight of ten Japanese Mitsubishi A6M Zero fighters was sighted approaching from the west, directly out of the sun. Register increased her speed and made radical course changes. The Japanese formation split up, but four of the planes headed for Register. Two came in from starboard, one from ahead, one from astern. Register shot down two, one of the starboard attackers and the one closing in astern; the plane attacking from ahead, however, began a low, gliding run in an attempt to crash Register's bridge. Passing down Register's port side, the kamikaze suicide plane was deflected overboard by the kingpost, which buckled and crashed over No. 3 40-millimeter gun, wounding 12 of Register's crew, including her commanding officer, and causing considerable damage to her hull. The fourth plane though damaged, escaped.

Relieved the following morning, 21 May 1945, Register retired to Hagushi, thence proceeded via Saipan in the Mariana Islands to Leyte in the Philippine Islands, where repairs begun at Okinawa were completed. By 29 June 1945 she was ready for action again.

Assigned to escort duty, Register escorted 20 tank landing ships (LSTs) to Okinawa, then accompanied a nine-ship convoy to Ulithi Atoll before returning to Leyte on 16 July 1945. At the end of July 1945 she escorted two escort aircraft carriers to Ulithi Atoll and, while en route back to Leyte, joined in the search for survivors of the sinking of the heavy cruiser USS Indianapolis (CA-35). On 3 August 1945 she picked up 12 of the heavy cruiser's crew. Transferring them to the hospital at Peleliu on 4 August 1945, she returned to the scene of the rescue, but found only life rafts and floater nets.

=== Postwar ===
At Leyte when hostilities ended on 15 August 1945, Register screened the battleships and cruisers of Task Group 95.7 to Okinawa from 20 August 1945 to 26 August 1945, then returned to the Philippines for the month of September 1945. In October 1945 she escorted transports carrying occupation troops to Japan, then served as harbor entrance patrol ship at Wakayama, Japan. Shifted to Nagoya toward the end of October 1945, she embarked United States Army and U.S. Navy personnel as passengers and headed east. Reaching Pearl Harbor on 15 November 1945, she continued on to the United States West Coast, thence steamed through the Panama Canal to Philadelphia, Pennsylvania, to begin inactivation.

== Decommissioning and disposal ==
Arriving at Philadelphia on 11 December 1945, Register departed in January 1946 and on 18 January 1946 arrived at Green Cove Springs, Florida. There she was decommissioned on 31 March 1946 and entered the Atlantic Reserve Fleet.

Later transferred to the Orange, Texas, berthing area, Register remained in the Atlantic Reserve Fleet until stricken from the Navy List on 1 September 1966. She was subsequently transferred to the Republic of China and served the Republic of China Navy as ROCS Tai Shan (PF-38) until scrapped in 1996.

== Honors and awards ==
Register received one battle star for her service in World War II.
