= USS Cread =

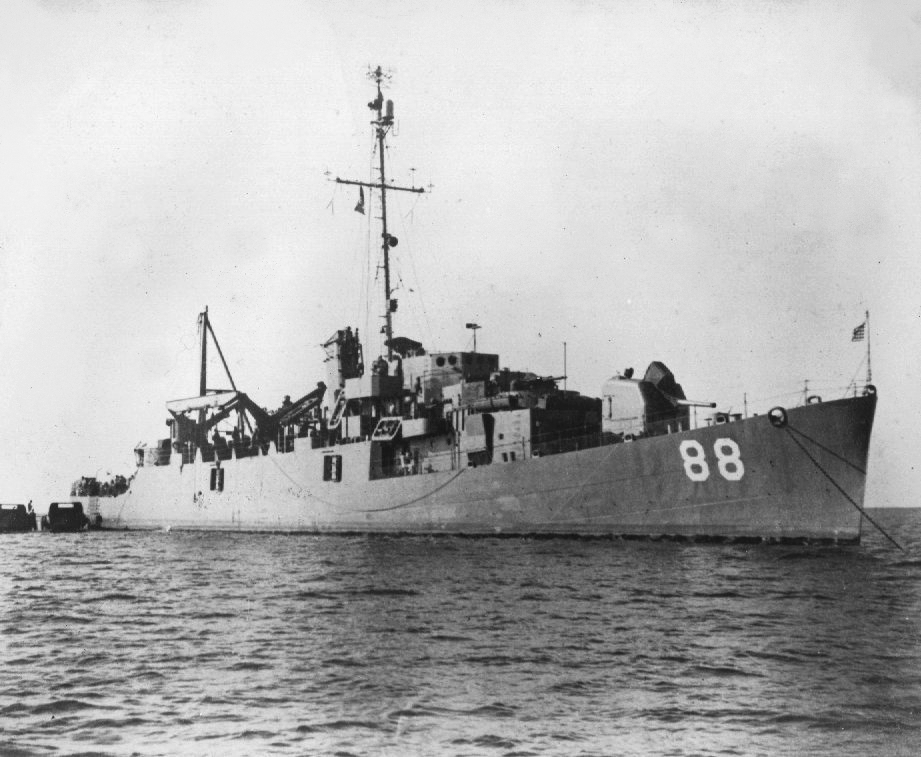

History

United States
- Name: Cread
- Namesake: Walter Irving Cread (US Navy, KIA on 12 December 1942)
- Operator: United States Navy
- Laid down: 6 October 1943
- Launched: 2 February 1944
- Sponsored by: H. Bergman
- Commissioned: 29 July 1945
- Decommissioned: 15 March 1946
- Reclassified: 17 July 1944
- Stricken: 1 June 1960
- Honors and awards: American Campaign Medal; World War II Victory Medal
- Fate: Sold for scrapping, 16 March 1961.

General characteristics
- Displacement: 1,400 tons
- Length: 306 ft (93 m)
- Beam: 37 ft (11 m)
- Draft: 12 ft 7 in (4 m)
- Propulsion: 2 × Babcox and Wilcox DR boilers; 2 × GE Turbines, (turbo-electric drive); 2 shafts (12,000 shp)
- Speed: 23.6 knots (27.2 mph; 43.7 km/h)
- Range: 6,000 nmi (11,000 km) at 12 kn (22 km/h)
- Boats & landing craft carried: 4 LCVPs
- Troops: 12 officers; 150 enlisted
- Complement: 12-15 officers; 189-192 enlisted
- Armament: 1 × 5"/38 dual purposegun mount; 3 × twin 40 mm gun mounts; 6 × single 20 mm gun mounts; 2 × depth charge tracks

USS Cread (APD-88) was a Crosley-class high speed transport that served in the United States Navy from 1945 to 1946. She was sold for scrapping in 1961.

== Namesake ==
Walter Irving Cread was born on 18 November 1923 in Los Angeles, California. He enlisted in the United States Naval Reserve 18 August 1941. He was rated fireman third class 18 October 1941 and assigned to duty on USS Hornet. As fireman second class, Cread was killed in action 12 December 1942 while attached to Motor Torpedo Boat Squadron Two.

== History ==
USS Cread was laid down as Rudderow-class destroyer escort "DE-227" on 16 October 1943 at the Philadelphia Naval Shipyard, and launched on 12 February 1944. She was converted to a Crosley-class high speed transport before her construction was complete, and commissioned on 29 July 1945.

=== Decommissioning and fate ===
The war ended before her training was complete and she was decommissioned on 15 March 1946, and laid up in the Atlantic Reserve Fleet at Green Cove Springs, Florida. She was stricken from the Naval Register on 1 June 1960, and sold for scrapping to the Southern Scrap Metal Company on 16 March 1961.

== Sources ==
- Photo gallery of USS Cread at NavSource Naval History
