= USS Arthur L. Bristol =

History

United States
- Name: USS Arthur L. Bristol
- Namesake: Vice Admiral Arthur L. Bristol (1886–1942), U.S. Navy officer
- Builder: Charleston Navy Yard, North Charleston, South Carolina
- Laid down: 1 December 1943
- Launched: 19 February 1944
- Sponsored by: Mrs. Ellen Wing Getty
- Commissioned: 25 June 1945
- Decommissioned: 29 April 1946
- Reclassified: From destroyer escort (DE-281) to high-speed transport (APD-97) 17 July 1944
- Stricken: 1 June 1964
- Fate: Sold for scrapping summer 1965; transferred to scrapping company 4 August 1965
- Notes: Laid down as Rudderow-class destroyer escort USS Arthur L. Bristol (DE-281)

General characteristics
- Class & type: Crosley-class high speed transport
- Displacement: 2,130 long tons (2,164 t) full
- Length: 306 ft (93 m)
- Beam: 37 ft (11 m)
- Draft: 12 ft 7 in (3.84 m)
- Speed: 23 knots (43 km/h; 26 mph)
- Troops: 162
- Complement: 204
- Armament: 1 × 5 in (130 mm) gun; 6 × 40 mm guns; 6 × 20 mm guns; 2 × depth charge tracks

USS Arthur L. Bristol (APD-97), ex-DE-281, was a United States Navy high-speed transport in commission from 1945 to 1946.

== Construction and commissioning ==
Arthur L. Bristol was laid down as the Rudderow-class destroyer escort USS Arthur L. Bristol (DE-281) on 1 December 1943 by the Charleston Navy Yard, and was launched on 19 February 1944, sponsored by Miss Ellen Wing Getty, who had been chosen for this honor by the brother of the ship's namesake, the late Vice Admiral Arthur L. Bristol. The ship was reclassified as a Crosley-class high-speed transport and redesignated APD-97 on 17 July 1944. After conversion to her new role, she was commissioned on 25 June 1945.

== Service history ==
After fitting out, Arthur L. Bristol proceeded to Guantánamo Bay, Cuba, where she carried out shakedown training from 13 July 1945 to 7 August 1945. After a brief post-shakedown shipyard availability at Norfolk, Virginia—during which World War II came to an end on 15 August 1945—she arrived at Naval Training Center Miami at Miami, Florida, early in September 1945. Arthur L. Bristol operated in the Florida Keys and in Cuban waters as a training ship for student officers for the rest of her active career.

Ordered to Mobile, Alabama, on 31 October 1945, Arthur L. Bristol was drydocked there before shifting to Naval Repair Base Algiers at Algiers, Louisiana, to commence preinactivation preservation. Assigned to the 163rd Transport Division, 18th Transport Squadron, Sub-Group 4, Florida Group, 16th Fleet—the future Atlantic Reserve Fleet—on 1 December 1945, Arthur L. Bristol was berthed at Green Cove Springs, Florida, in the St. Johns River berthing area.

== Decommissioning and disposal ==
Arthur L. Bristol was decommissioned at Green Cove Springs on 29 April 1946 and placed in reserve there. Never returning to active service, she was stricken from the Naval Vessel Register on 1 June 1964 and sold for scrapping in the summer of 1965. She was transferred to her purchaser, the Boston Metals Corporation of Baltimore, Maryland, on 4 August 1965 and removed from U.S. Navy custody that day.
