= USS Don O. Woods =

Crosley-class high-speed transport ship

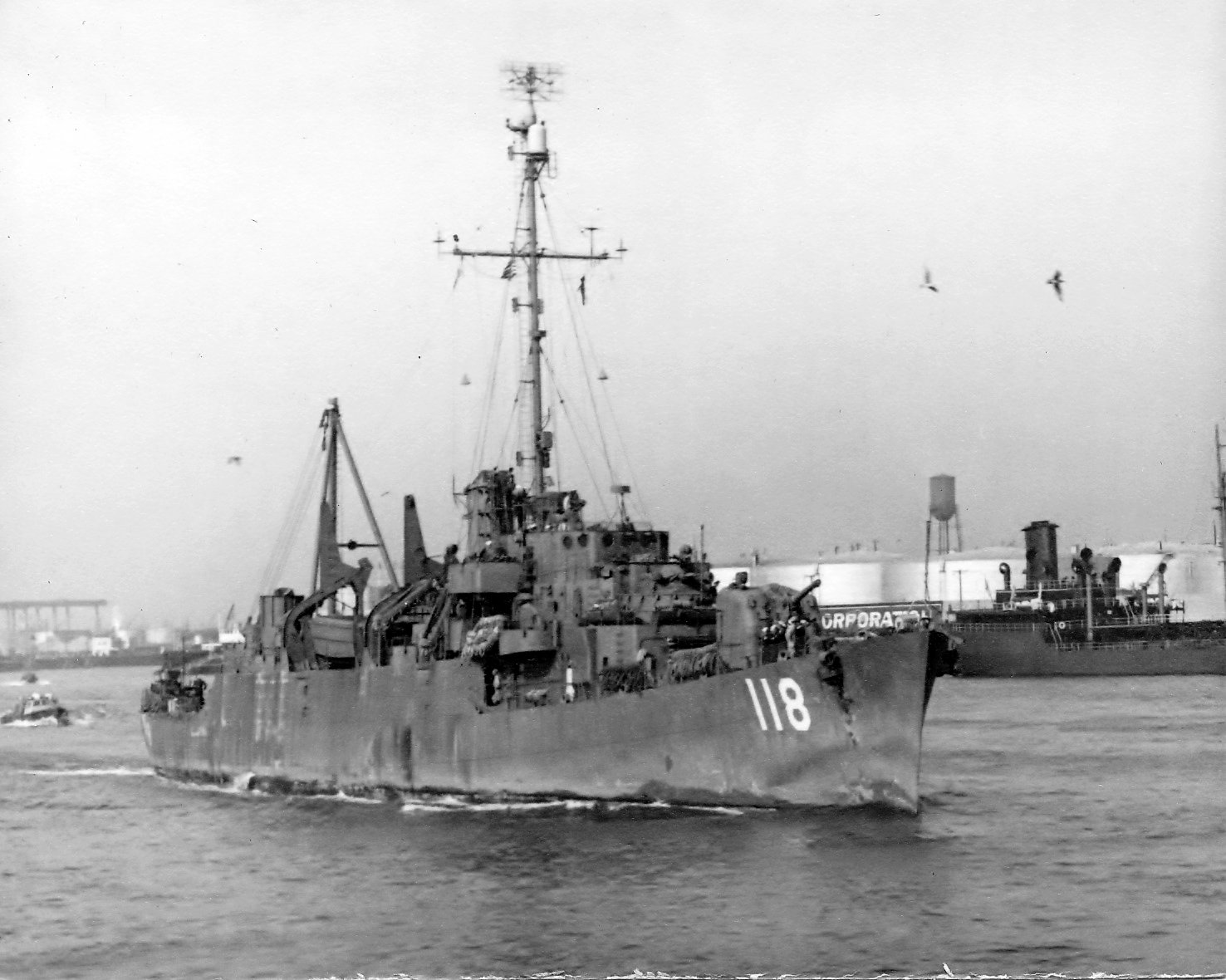
- USS Don O. Woods

History

United States
- Name: Don O. Woods
- Namesake: Don O. Woods
- Awarded: 13 June 1943
- Builder: Dravo Corporation, Pittsburgh
- Laid down: 1 December 1943
- Launched: 9 February 1944
- Reclassified: APD-118, before commissioning
- Acquired: 26 May 1945
- Commissioned: 28 May 1945
- Decommissioned: 18 June 1946
- Stricken: 12 December 1963
- Identification: DE-721
- Fate: transferred to Mexican Navy, 12 December 1963

History

Mexico
- Name: ARM Usumacinta (B06)
- Namesake: Usumacinta River
- Acquired: 12 December 1963
- Renamed: ARM Miguel Hidalgo (B-06), 1994
- Namesake: Miguel Hidalgo y Costilla
- Renamed: ARM Usumacinta (E-20)
- Stricken: 16 July 2001
- Fate: Scrapped 2002

General characteristics
- Class & type: Rudderow-class destroyer escort, as ordered
- Class & type: Crosley-class high speed transport, as completed
- Displacement: 1,450 tons
- Length: 306 ft (93 m)
- Beam: 36 ft 10 in (11.23 m)
- Draft: 13 ft (4.0 m)
- Speed: 24 knots
- Complement: 256
- Armament: 1 × 5 in (130 mm)/38 guns

USS Don O. Woods (APD-118) was a Crosley-class high-speed transport in service with the United States Navy from 1945 to 1946. In 1963, she was transferred to Mexico, where she served as ARM Usumacinta/Miguel Hidalgo (B-06) until 2001.

== History ==
=== U.S. Navy (1945–1946) ===
Don O. Woods keel was laid at the Dravo Corporation, Neville Island, Pittsburgh, Pennsylvania on 1 December 1944. the ship was launched on 9 February 1944, sponsored by Mrs. H. R. Woods, mother of the ship's namesake. Don O. Woods was reclassified APD-118 on 17 July 1944 and floated to Orange, Texas for completion as a high speed transport by the Consolidated Steel Corporation. She was commissioned there on 28 May 1945.

Don O. Woods sailed from Norfolk 9 August 1945 and was making her transit of the Panama Canal on the day hostilities ended between Japan and the United States. She called at San Diego and proceeded to Pearl Harbor, arriving 7 September. Five days later she got underway with US Army and US Navy passengers for Saipan, continuing to Leyte, where she arrived 7 October. She served in the Philippines until 23 January 1946 when she departed Manila for the west coast. Arriving at San Pedro, Los Angeles on 13 February. She was placed out of commission in reserve 18 June 1946.

=== Mexican Navy (1963–2001) ===
Don O. Woods was sold and transferred to the custody of Mexico in December 1963 and renamed Usumacinta (H-06), then redesignated (B-06) and renamed Miguel Hidalgo, her speed being reduced to 13 knots. Miguel Hidalgo was decommissioned from the Mexican Navy in 2001. She was scrapped afterward.

== Namesake ==
Don O. Woods is named in honor of Hospital Apprentice First Class Don Otis Woods. He was born on 19 May 1922 in Kearney, Nebraska and enlisted in the Navy on 12 June 1940.

Hospital Apprentice Woods died of wounds received in enemy action on 8 August 1942 while serving with the Marines against Japanese forces on Gavutu, Solomon Islands. On his own courageous initiative, Woods, in an effort to rescue several injured Marines, waded into the sea near a rock cliff where numerous hostile snipers were menacing troops. Although repeatedly warned of his imminent peril, he refused to abandon his heroic work but continued, less than twenty-five yards from the enemy position, to render medical assistance to the helpless men until he himself was mortally wounded. He gallantly gave his life in the service of his country. As a result of his exceptional courage he was posthumously presented the Silver Star.

== Awards ==
American Campaign Medal
Asiatic-Pacific Campaign Medal
World War II Victory Medal
Philippine Liberation Medal
