= Crosley-class high speed transport =

1944 class of US Navy ships

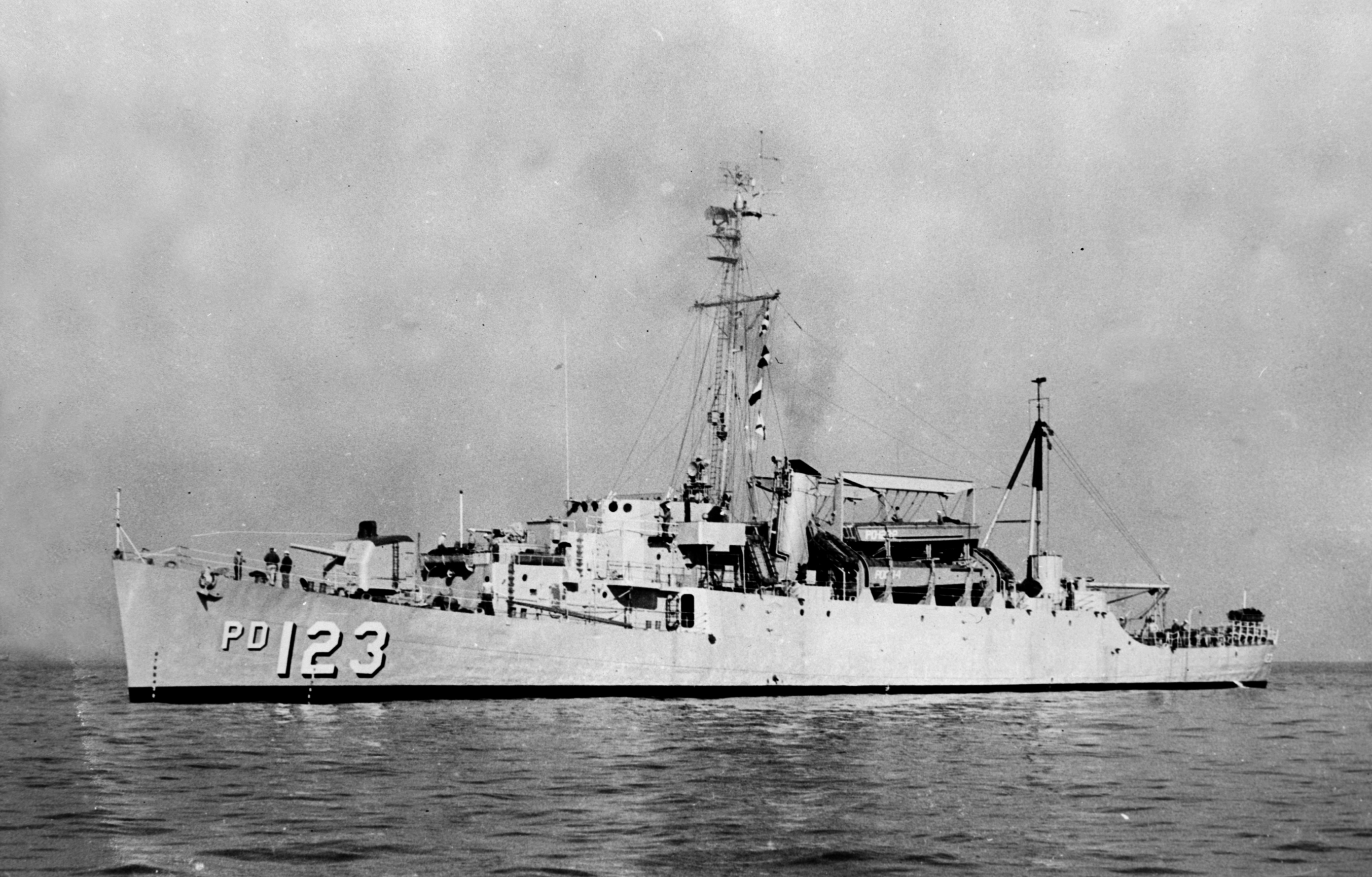
- USS Diachenko

Class overview
- Name: Crosley class
- Operators: United States Navy; Mexican Navy; Republic of Korea Navy; Republic of China Navy; Colombian National Navy
- Preceded by: Charles Lawrence class
- Planned: 53
- Completed: 51
- Canceled: 2
- Preserved: ARC Cordoba

General characteristics
- Type: High speed transport
- Displacement: 1400 BRT
- Length: 306 ft (93 m)
- Beam: 37 ft (11 m)
- Draft: 12 ft 7 in (3.84 m)
- Propulsion: Turbo-electric, 2 shafts
- Speed: 23.5 knots (27.0 mph; 43.5 km/h)
- Range: 6,000 nmi (11,000 km; 6,900 mi) at 12 kn (22 km/h; 14 mph)
- Complement: 12 officers, 192 enlisted.
- Armament: 1 × 5"/38 caliber gun; 6 × 40mm Bofors AA (3 × 2); 6 × 20mm Oerlikon AA (6 × 1)
- Aircraft carried: None
- Aviation facilities: None

Crosley-class high speed transports were high speed transport ships that served in the United States Navy during World War II. Some stayed in commission long enough to serve in the Korean War and the Vietnam War. All of them were converted from Rudderow-class destroyer escorts during construction except for USS Bray (APD-139), which was converted a year after her construction. After World War II ended, several of the ships were sold to Mexico, South Korea, Taiwan, and Colombia.

Today, ARC Cordoba (DT-15), formerly USS Ruchamkin (APD-89) is the only surviving member of the class, preserved as a museum ship in Tocancipa, Colombia.

== Ships in class ==
Ships in class
Name	Hull Number	Builder	Laid down	Launched	Commissioned	Decommissioned	Fate
Crosley	APD-87	Philadelphia Naval Shipyard	16 October 1943	12 February 1944	22 October 1944	15 November 1946	Struck 1 June 1960, Sold to Ecuador as a power hulk
Cread	APD-88	Philadelphia Naval Shipyard	6 October 1943	2 February 1944	29 July 1945	15 March 1946	Struck 1 June 1960
Ruchamkin	APD-89	Philadelphia Naval Shipyard	14 February 1944	15 June 1944	16 September 1945	24 November 1969	Transferred to Colombia, 24 November 1969; Museum ship at Jaime Duque Park
Kirwin	APD-90	Philadelphia Naval Shipyard	14 February 1944	15 June 1944	4 November 1945	16 December 1968	Struck 15 September 1974
Kinzer	APD-91	Charleston Naval Shipyard	9 September 1943	9 December 1943	1 November 1944	18 December 1946	Struck 1 March 1965, Sold to the Republic of China, 21 April 1965
Register	APD-92	Charleston Naval Shipyard	27 October 1943	20 January 1944	11 January 1945	31 March 1946	Struck 1 September 1966, Sold to the Republic of China, 1966
Brock	APD-93	Charleston Naval Shipyard	27 October 1943	20 January 1944	9 February 1945	5 May 1947	Struck 1 June 1960, Sold to Colombia for use as floating power plant January 1962
John Q. Roberts	APD-94	Charleston Naval Shipyard	15 November 1943	11 February 1944	8 March 1945	30 May 1946	Struck 1 June 1960
William M. Hobby	APD-95	Charleston Naval Shipyard	15 November 1943	2 February 1944	4 April 1945	6 April 1946	Struck 1 May 1967
Ray K. Edwards	APD-96	Charleston Naval Shipyard	1 December 1943	19 February 1944	11 June 1945	30 August 1946	Struck 1 June 1960
Arthur L. Bristol	APD-97	Charleston Naval Shipyard	1 December 1943	19 February 1944	25 June 1945	29 April 1946	Struck 1 June 1964
Truxtun	APD-98	Charleston Naval Shipyard	13 December 1943	9 March 1944	9 July 1945	15 March 1946	Struck 15 January 1966
Upham	APD-99	Charleston Naval Shipyard	13 December 1943	9 March 1944	23 July 1945	25 April 1946	Struck 1 June 1960
Ringness	APD-100	Bethlehem Hingham Shipyard	23 December 1943	5 February 1944	25 October 1944	5 June 1946	Struck 15 September 1974
Knudson	APD-101	Bethlehem Hingham Shipyard	23 December 1943	5 February 1944	25 November 1944	2 January 1958	Struck 15 July 1972
Rednour	APD-102	Bethlehem Hingham Shipyard	30 December 1943	12 February 1944	30 December 1944	24 July 1946	Struck 1 March 1967, Transferred to Mexican Navy, December 1969
Tollberg	APD-103	Bethlehem Hingham Shipyard	30 December 1943	12 February 1944	31 January 1945	20 December 1946	Struck November 1964, Transferred to Colombia, 14 August 1965
William J. Pattison	APD-104	Bethlehem Hingham Shipyard	4 January 1944	15 February 1944	27 February 1945	18 June 1946	Struck 1 June 1960
Myers	APD-105	Bethlehem Hingham Shipyard	15 January 1944	15 February 1944	26 March 1945	13 January 1947	Struck 1 June 1960
Walter B. Cobb	APD-106	Bethlehem Hingham Shipyard	15 January 1944	23 February 1944	25 April 1945	29 March 1946	Struck 15 January 1966
Earle B. Hall	APD-107	Bethlehem Hingham Shipyard	9 January 1944	1 March 1944	15 May 1945	15 January 1965	Struck 1 February 1965
Harry L. Corl	APD-108	Bethlehem Hingham Shipyard	19 January 1944	1 March 1944	5 June 1945	21 June 1946	Struck 15 January 1966
Belet	APD-109	Bethlehem Hingham Shipyard	26 January 1944	3 March 1944	15 June 1945	22 May 1946	Struck 12 December 1963
Julius A. Raven	APD-110	Bethlehem Hingham Shipyard	26 January 1944	3 March 1944	28 June 1945	31 May 1946	Struck 15 January 1966
Walsh	APD-111	Bethlehem Hingham Shipyard	27 February 1945	27 April 1945	11 July 1945	26 April 1946	1 May 1966
Hunter Marshall	APD-112	Bethlehem Hingham Shipyard		5 May 1945	17 July 1945	30 May 1946	Struck 1 June 1960
Earheart	APD-113	Bethlehem Hingham Shipyard	20 March 1945	12 May 1945	26 July 1945	29 April 1946	Struck 12 December 1963
Walter S. Gorka	APD-114	Bethlehem Hingham Shipyard	3 April 1945	26 May 1945	7 August 1945	January 1947	Struck 1 June 1960
Rogers Blood	APD-115	Bethlehem Hingham Shipyard	12 April 1945	2 June 1945	22 August 1945	19 March 1946	Struck 1 June 1960
Francovich	APD-116	Bethlehem Hingham Shipyard	19 April 1945	5 June 1945	6 September 1945	29 April 1946	Struck 1 April 1964
Joseph M. Auman	APD-117	Consolidated Steel, Orange, TX	8 November 1943	5 February 1944	25 April 1945	10 July 1946	12 December 1963
Don O. Woods	APD-118	Consolidated Steel, Orange, TX	1 December 1943	9 February 1944	28 May 1945	18 June 1946	Struck 12 December 1963
Beverly W. Reid	APD-119	Consolidated Steel, Orange, TX	5 January 1944	4 March 1944	25 June 1945	14 November 1969	Struck 15 September 1974
Kline	APD-120	Bethlehem Steel Corporation, Fore River Shipyard, Quincy, Massachusetts	27 May 1944	27 June 1944	18 October 1944	10 March 1947	Struck 15 January 1966
Raymon W. Herndon	APD-121	Bethlehem Steel Corporation, Fore River Shipyard, Quincy, Massachusetts	12 June 1944	15 July 1944	3 November 1944	15 November 1946	Struck 1 September 1966
Scribner	APD-122	Bethlehem Steel Corporation, Fore River Shipyard, Quincy, Massachusetts	29 June 1944	1 August 1944	20 November 1944	15 November 1946	Struck 1 August 1966
Diachenko	APD-123	Bethlehem Steel Corporation, Fore River Shipyard, Quincy, Massachusetts	18 July 1944	15 August 1944	8 December 1944		Struck 15 September 1974
Horace A. Bass	APD-124	Bethlehem Steel Corporation, Fore River Shipyard, Quincy, Massachusetts	3 August 1944	12 September 1944	21 December 1944	30 July 1969	Struck 15 September 1974
Wantuck	APD-125	Bethlehem Steel Corporation, Fore River Shipyard, Quincy, Massachusetts	17 August 1944	25 September 1944	30 December 1944	15 November 1957	Struck 4 March 1958
Gosselin	APD-126	Defoe Shipbuilding Company		17 February 1944	31 December 1944	11 July 1949	Struck 1 April 1964
Begor	APD-127	Defoe Shipbuilding Company	6 March 1944	25 May 1944	14 March 1945	13 July 1962	Struck 15 May 1975
Cavallaro	APD-128	Defoe Shipbuilding Company	28 March 1944	15 June 1944	13 March 1945	15 October 1959	Struck 15 November 1974
Donald W. Wolf	APD-129	Defoe Shipbuilding Company	17 April 1944	22 July 1944	14 April 1945	15 May 1946	Struck 1 March 1965
Cook	APD-130	Defoe Shipbuilding Company	7 May 1944	26 August 1944	25 April 1945	15 November 1969	Struck 15 November 1969
Walter X. Young	APD-131	Defoe Shipbuilding Company	27 May 1944	30 September 1944	1 May 1945	2 July 1946	Struck 1 May 1962
Balduck	APD-132	Defoe Shipbuilding Company	17 June 1944	27 October 1944	7 May 1945	28 February 1958	Struck 15 July 1975
Burdo	APD-133	Defoe Shipbuilding Company		25 November 1944	2 June 1945	28 February 1958	Struck 1 April 1966
Kleinsmith	APD-134	Defoe Shipbuilding Company	8 August 1944	27 January 1945	12 June 1945	16 May 1960	Struck 16 May 1960
Weiss	APD-135	Defoe Shipbuilding Company	14 October 1944	17 February 1945	7 July 1945	January 1970	Struck 15 September 1974
Carpellotti	APD-136	Defoe Shipbuilding Company	31 October 1944	10 March 1945	30 July 1945	21 April 1958	Struck 1 December 1959
Bray	APD-139	Defoe Shipbuilding Company	January 1944	15 April 1944	4 September 1944	10 May 1946	Struck 1 June 1960
