= High-speed transport =

WWII US Navy warship classification (APD)

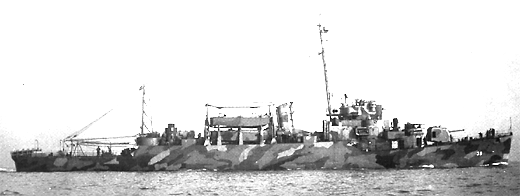
USS Barr (APD-39) (ex-DE-576) shown after conversion to Auxiliary High Speed Transport

High-speed transports were converted destroyers and destroyer escorts used in US Navy amphibious operations in World War II and afterward. They received the US Hull classification symbol APD; "AP" for transport and "D" for destroyer. In 1969, the remaining ships were reclassified as "Fast Amphibious Transports", hull symbol LPR.

APDs were intended to deliver small units such as Marine Raiders, Underwater Demolition Teams, and United States Army Rangers onto hostile shores. An APD could carry up to 200 troops - a company-size unit - and approximately 40 tons of cargo. It could also provide gunfire support if needed. USS Manley was officially designated the Navy's first high-speed transport on 2 August 1940 when she became APD-1.

== Development ==
Before the United States entered World War II, as newer and more modern destroyers joined the fleet, some older destroyers were refitted for other duties: as seaplane tenders, destroyer minelayers, or destroyer minesweepers, and in an innovation, as fast transports carrying fully equipped troops for assault landings. During the war, newly built or unfinished destroyer escorts were converted to APDs.

=== "Flush-deck" conversions ===
The first group of APDs (APD-1 through APD-36) were converted from one Caldwell-class, 17 Wickes-class, and 14 Clemson-class "flush-deck" destroyers built during and after World War I. Some of these had been previously converted to aircraft tenders or other uses.

In the conversion, the two forward boilers (out of four) were removed along with their smokestacks (reducing speed to 25 knots (46 km/h)). Accommodation for 200 troops was installed in the former engine spaces. The original armament of four 4"/50 low-angle guns, one 3"/23 anti-aircraft gun, and twelve 21-inch torpedo tubes was replaced with three modern 3"/50 dual-purpose guns, one 40 mm AA gun, and five 20 mm AA guns. Two depth charge racks and up to six K-gun depth charge throwers were carried. In place of the torpedo mounts, four davit-mounted LCPLs (Landing Craft Personnel, Large) were shipped. Later, the LCPLs were replaced by a version with a bow ramp, the LCPR (Landing Craft Personnel, Ramped).

=== Destroyer Escort (DE) conversions ===
==== Buckley-class conversions ====
The second group of APDs were converted from 43 Buckley-class destroyer escorts (DE)s built in 1943–1945. Two further planned conversions were canceled at the end of the war. These converted vessels were known as the Charles Lawrence class.

In the conversion, the superstructure was expanded to provide accommodation for 162 troops. The original gun armament of three 3"/50 DP guns and two 40 mm AA guns in a twin mount was replaced with one 5"/38 DP gun and six 40 mm AA guns in three twin mounts. The original six 20mm AA guns were retained. The Charles Lawrence class also had two depth charge racks and up to eight K-guns. Typically, the converted DEs carried four LCVPs (Landing Craft Vehicle and Personnel) in a stacked davit configuration.

==== Rudderow-class conversions ====
The third group of APDs were converted from 51 Rudderow-class destroyer escorts built in 1943–1945. All but one of these were converted while under construction. These converted vessels were known as the Crosley class.

This conversion was the same as the Buckley class, except that the original Rudderow low bridge was retained as compared with the higher bridge of the Buckley Destroyer Escorts.

== World War II service ==
In the Guadalcanal campaign, neither side enjoyed the overwhelming local naval and air supremacy which ensured victory in every other amphibious operation of the war. This necessitated an increase in the number of high-speed transports, hybrid warships which combined the functions of transports and destroyers. The concept of the high-speed transport embodied sufficient armament for the ship to defend herself against smaller warships and to support the troops she carried.

APDs performed arduous service. They transported troops to beachheads, served as escorts for transports and supply vessels, conducted anti-submarine patrols and survey duties, operated with Underwater Demolition Teams and commando units, performed messenger and transport duties, conveyed passengers and mail to and from forward units, and were involved in minesweeping operations. They were attacked by submarines, surface ships and aircraft (including kamikazes), and many were damaged or sunk.

== After World War II ==
Nine "flush deck" APDs were lost during the war. The remaining 23 were scrapped in 1945–1946.

Some of the Charles Lawrence-class and Crosley-class APDs saw service in the Korean War and Vietnam War.

One Charles Lawrence-class APD was lost during World War II. 14 were transferred to foreign navies in the 1960s. One was sold for commercial use as a floating power station. 26 were scrapped. On 1 January 1969, the remaining three were reclassified as "Fast Amphibious Transports" (LPR).

No Crosley-class APD was lost during World War II. 18 were transferred to foreign navies. One (APD-106) was lost in a collision in 1966. Eight were sold as floating power stations. 18 were scrapped. In 1969, the remaining eight were reclassified as "Fast Amphibious Transports" (LPR).

== Japanese WWII fast transports ==
The Imperial Japanese Navy also built fast destroyer-transports. The Japanese had used unmodified destroyers to act as ad-hoc fast transports in the "Tokyo Express", sailing down "The Slot" to drop supplies during the Guadalcanal campaign; these destroyers would tow supply barges or just drop supplies overboard in buoyant steel drums before racing back to their bases.

This method saw considerable wastage, and the Imperial Japanese Navy decided to order the design of the Number 1 (or T1) class of purpose-build fast destroyer transports (earlier, two Minekaze-class destroyers had been converted to fast destroyer transports). These new ships were based on the Matsu-class destroyer, with the stern sloping down to the waterline to allow fast deployment of Daihatsu landing craft or other boats, amphibious tanks, or cargo. However, by the time these were operational, they had limited use for a navy that was no longer involved in far-flung offensive operations.

== See also ==
- List of United States Navy high-speed transports
- HMS Campbeltown (I42) - Wickes class transferred to UK and used in the St. Nazaire Raid
- ARA Hércules (B-52) - Type 42 destroyer converted in ASMAR (Chile) for the Argentine Navy in the 2000s
- Attack transport
