= List of ships of World War II (D) =

The List of ships of the Second World War contains major military vessels of the war, arranged alphabetically and by type. The list includes armed vessels that served during the war and in the immediate aftermath, inclusive of localized ongoing combat operations, garrison surrenders, post-surrender occupation, colony re-occupation, troop and prisoner repatriation, to the end of 1945. For smaller vessels, see also list of World War II ships of less than 1000 tons. Some uncompleted Axis ships are included, out of historic interest. Ships are designated to the country under which they operated for the longest period of the Second World War, regardless of where they were built or previous service history. Submarines show submerged displacement.

Click on headers to sort column alphabetically.

List of ships of World War II (D)
Ship	Country or organization	Class	Type	Displacement (tons)	First commissioned	Fate
Dahlgren	United States Navy	Clemson	destroyer	1,200	6 January 1920	scrapped 1946
Dahlia	Royal Navy	Flower	corvette	925	21 March 1941	
Dale	United States Navy	Farragut	destroyer	1,365	17 June 1935	scrapped 1947
Dale W. Peterson	United States Navy	Edsall	destroyer escort	1,250	17 February 1944	decommissioned 1946, scrapped 1972
Dallas	United States Navy	Clemson	destroyer	1,200	29 October 1920	scrapped 1945
Daly	United States Navy	Fletcher	destroyer	2,050	24 October 1942	decommissioned 1960, scrapped 1976
Damon M. Cummings	United States Navy	Buckley	destroyer escort	1,400	29 June 1944	decommissioned 1947, scrapped 1973
Daniel	United States Navy	Edsall	destroyer escort	1,250	24 January 1944	decommissioned 1946, scrapped 1974
Daniel A. Joy	United States Navy	Rudderow	destroyer escort	1,450	28 April 1944	scrapped 1966
Daniel T. Griffin	United States Navy	Buckley	destroyer escort	1,400	9 June 1943	to Chile 1966
Darby	United States Navy	Buckley	destroyer escort	1,400	15 November 1943	sunk as target 1970
Dasher	Royal Navy	Attacker	escort carrier	8,200	2 July 1942	sunk 27 March 1943
Dashiell	United States Navy	Fletcher	destroyer	2,050	20 March 1943	decommissioned 1960, scrapped 1975
Dauntless	Royal Navy	Danae	cruiser	4,850	10 April 1918	scrapped 1946
Dauphin	Royal Canadian Navy	Flower	corvette	925	17 May 1941	paid off 20 June 1945
David W. Taylor	United States Navy	Fletcher	destroyer	2,050	18 September 1943	to Spain 1957, scrapped 1987
Davis	United States Navy	Somers	destroyer	1,850	9 November 1938	scrapped 1947
Davison	United States Navy	Gleaves	destroyer	1,630	11 September 1942	decommissioned 1949, scrapped 1973
Dawson	Royal Canadian Navy	Flower	corvette	925	6 October 1941	paid off 19 June 1945
Day	United States Navy	Rudderow	destroyer escort	1,450	10 June 1944	
Dayton	United States Navy	Cleveland	light cruiser	11,800	7 January 1945	scrapped 1962
Decatur	United States Navy	Clemson	destroyer	1,200	August 1922	scrapped 1945
Decker	United States Navy; Republic of China Navy	Buckley	destroyer escort	1,140	3 May 1943	to Republic of China as Tai Ping 28 August 1945; sunk in action 1954
Decoy	Royal Navy; Royal Canadian Navy	D	destroyer	1,375	4 April 1933	Transferred to RCN 12 April 1943 as HMCS Kootenay, paid off 26 October 1945
Deede	United States Navy	Evarts	destroyer escort	1,140	29 July 1943	scrapped 1947
De Haven (I)	United States Navy	Fletcher	destroyer	2,050	21 June 1942	sunk 1 February 1943
De Haven (II)	United States Navy	Allen M. Sumner	destroyer	2,200	31 March 1944	to South Korea 1973, scrapped 1993
Delhi	Royal Navy	Danae	cruiser	4,850	June 1919	scrapped 1948
DeLong	United States Navy	Rudderow	destroyer escort	1,450	31 December 1943	sunk as target 1970
Delphinium	Royal Navy	Flower	corvette	925	15 November 1940	
Dempsey	United States Navy	Evarts	destroyer escort	1,140	23 July 1943	scrapped 1947
Dennis	United States Navy	John C. Butler	destroyer escort	1,350	20 March 1944	decommissioned 1946, scrapped 1973
Dennis J. Buckley	United States Navy	Gearing	destroyer	2,250	2 March 1945	scrapped 1974
Dent	United States Navy	Wickes	destroyer	1,150	9 September 1918	scrapped 1946
Denver	United States Navy	Cleveland	light cruiser	11,800	15 October 1942	scrapped 1960
De Ruyter	Netherlands	De Ruyter	cruiser	7,822	3 October 1936	sunk 28 February 1942
Derwent	Royal Navy	Hunt	destroyer escort	1,050	24 April 1942	scrapped 1947
Despatch	Royal Navy	Danae	cruiser	4,850	2 June 1922	scrapped 1946
Detroit	United States Navy	Omaha	light cruiser	7,050	31 July 1923	scrapped 1946
Deutschland	Kriegsmarine	Deutschland	heavy cruiser	12,100	1 April 1933	renamed Lützow
Devonshire	Royal Navy	County	cruiser	9,750	18 March 1929	scrapped December 1954
Dewey	United States Navy	Farragut	destroyer	1,365	14 October 1934	scrapped 1946
Diana	Royal Navy; Royal Canadian Navy	D	destroyer	1,375	21 December 1932	Transferred to RCN 6 September 1940 as Margaree, sunk in 22 October 1940
Dianella	Royal Navy	Flower	corvette	925	6 January 1941	
Dianthus	Royal Navy	Flower	corvette	925	17 March 1941	
Dickerson	United States Navy	Wickes	destroyer	1,150	3 September 1919	sunk 4 April 1945
Diomede	Royal Navy	Danae	cruiser	4,850	24 April 1922	scrapped 1946
Dionne	United States Navy	Evarts	destroyer escort	1,140	16 July 1943	scrapped 1947
Dittany	Royal Navy; United States Navy	Flower modified	corvette	1,015	7 March 1943	to US as Beacon 7 March 1943, to UK 31 May 1943
Dobler	United States Navy	Evarts	destroyer escort	1,140	17 May 1943	scrapped 1946
Doherty	United States Navy	Evarts	destroyer escort	1,140	6 February 1943	scrapped 1946
Donaldson	United States Navy	Evarts	destroyer escort	1,140	1 December 1943	scrapped 1946
Doneff	United States Navy	Evarts	destroyer escort	1,140	10 June 1943	scrapped 1947
Donnell	United States Navy	Buckley	destroyer escort	1,400	26 June 1943	damaged August 1943 and converted to power barge, scrapped 1946
Donner	United States Navy	Casa Grande	Dock landing ship	7,930	31 July 1945	Scrapped March 2005
Doran	United States Navy	Gleaves	destroyer	1,630	4 August 1942	decommissioned 1947, scrapped 1973
Dorsey	United States Navy	Wickes	destroyer	1,150	16 September 1918	grounded in typhoon, 9 October 1945
Dortch	United States Navy	Fletcher	destroyer	2,050	7 August 1943	to Argentina 1961, scrapped 1977
Douglas	Royal Navy	Admiralty	destroyer flotilla leader	1,610	2 September 1918	scrapped 20 March 1945
Douglas A. Munro	United States Navy	John C. Butler	destroyer escort	1,350	11 July 1944	decommissioned 1960, sunk as target 1966
Douglas H. Fox	United States Navy	Allen M. Sumner	destroyer	2,200	26 December 1944	to Chile 1974, sunk as target 1998
Douglas L. Howard	United States Navy	Evarts	destroyer escort	1,250	29 July 1943	decommissioned 1946, scrapped 1974
Downes	United States Navy	Mahan	destroyer	1,450	15 January 1937	destroyed 7 December 1941 but "rebuilt," scrapped 1948
Doyle	United States Navy	Gleaves	destroyer	1,630	27 January 1943	decommissioned 1955, scrapped 1972
Doyle C. Barnes	United States Navy	John C. Butler	destroyer escort	1,350	13 July 1944	decommissioned 1947, scrapped 1973
Drache	Kriegsmarine		minelayer	1,870	17 April 1941	captured from Yugoslav, Zmaj, sunk 22 September 1944
Dragon	Royal Navy; Polish Navy	Danae	cruiser	4,850	August 1918	damaged, then used as a blockship in "Gooseberry" breakwater, July 1944
Drava	Royal Yugoslav Navy	Enns	river monitor	536	15 April 1920	sunk 12 April 1941
Drazki	Bulgarian Navy	Drazki	torpedo boat	97	1907	Surviving parts were incorporated in a museum ship at the Naval Museum in Varna under the same name, using the hull of Strogi
Drayton	United States Navy	Mahan	destroyer	1,450	1 September 1936	scrapped 1947
Drexler	United States Navy	Allen M. Sumner	destroyer	2,200	14 November 1944	sunk 28 May 1945
Dristigheten	Swedish Navy	Dristigheten	seaplane carrier	3,445	5 September 1901	paid off 13 June 1947
Drottning Victoria	Swedish Navy	Sverige	coastal defence ship	7,125	12 March 1921	paid off 22 March 1957, scrapped 1959
Drum	United States	Gato	submarine	1,525 surfaced	1 November 1941	decommissioned 1967; museum at Mobile, Alabama
Drumheller	Royal Canadian Navy	Flower	corvette	925	13 September 1941	paid off 11 July 1945
Dubrovnik	Royal Yugoslav Navy	Dubrovnik	destroyer	1,210	August 1939	Scuttled by crew on 17 April 1941
Duffy	United States Navy	Evarts	destroyer escort	1,140	5 August 1943	scrapped 1947
Dufilho	United States Navy	John C. Butler	destroyer escort	1,350	21 July 1944	decommissioned 1946, scrapped 1973
Duguay-Trouin	French Navy; Free French Naval Forces	Duguay-Trouin	light cruiser	7,250	2 November 1926	decommissioned 9 March 1952
Duilio	Regia Marina	Andrea Doria	battleship	25,920	1915	1956
Duke of York	Royal Navy	King George V	battleship	35,000	28 February 1940	scrapped 1957
Duluth	United States Navy	Cleveland	light cruiser	11,800	18 September 1944	scrapped 1960
Dulverton	Royal Navy	Hunt	destroyer escort	1,000	September 1941	scuttled on 13 November 1943
Duncan (I)	United States Navy	Gleaves	destroyer	1,630	16 April 1942	sunk 12 October 1942
Duncan (II)	United States Navy	Gearing	destroyer	2,250	25 February 1945	decommissioned 1971, sunk as target 1980
Dundas	Royal Canadian Navy	Flower	corvette	925	1 April 1942	paid off 17 July 1945
Dundee	Royal Navy	Shoreham	sloop	1,060	31 March 1933	Torpedoed and sunk 15 September 1940
Dunedin	Royal Navy	Danae	cruiser	4,850	19 November 1918	lost 24 November 1941
Dunkerque	French Navy	Dunkerque	battleship	26,500	15 April 1937	scuttled 27 November 1942
Dunlap	United States Navy	Mahan	destroyer	1,450	12 June 1937	scrapped 1948
Dunvegan	Royal Canadian Navy	Flower	corvette	925	9 September 1941	paid off 3 July 1945
Dunvegan Castle	Royal Navy		Armed merchant cruiser	15,007	7 September 1939	sunk 28 August 1940
Dupleix	French Navy	Suffren	heavy cruiser	10,000	7 July 1932	scuttled 27 November 1942
Du Pont	United States Navy	Wickes	destroyer	1,150	30 April 1919	scrapped 1947
Duquesne	French Navy; Free French Naval Forces	Duquesne	heavy cruiser	10,000	6 December 1928	condemned 1955
Durban	Royal Navy	Danae	cruiser	4,850	1 November 1921	"Gooseberry" breakwater blockship, 9 June 1944
Durant	United States Navy	Edsall	destroyer escort	1,250	17 February 1944	decommissioned 1964, scrapped 1974
Durik	United States Navy	Buckley	destroyer escort	1,400	16 November 1943	decommissioned 1946, scrapped 1967
Dyess	United States Navy	Gearing	destroyer	2,250	21 May 1945	scrapped 1981
Dyson	United States Navy	Fletcher	destroyer	2,050	30 December 1942	to West Germany 1960, scrapped 1982
