= USS Wasatch =

1943 Mount McKinley-class command ship

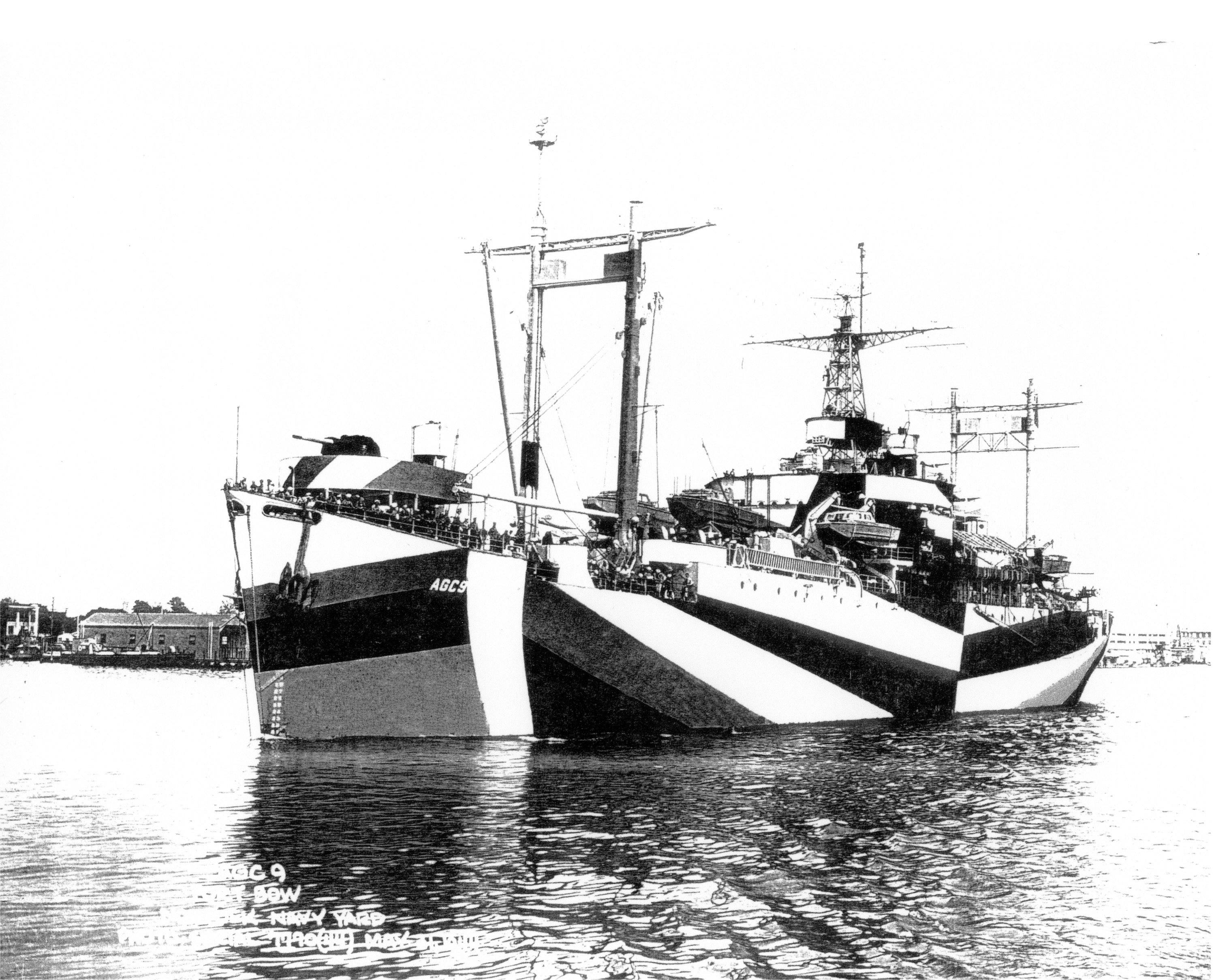

History

United States
- Name: USS Wasatch
- Namesake: Wasatch Range in Utah
- Builder: North Carolina Shipbuilding Company, Wilmington, North Carolina
- Laid down: 7 August 1943
- Launched: 8 October 1943
- Acquired: 31 December 1943
- Commissioned: 20 May 1944
- Decommissioned: 30 August 1946
- Stricken: 1 January 1960
- Honours and awards: 5 battle stars
- Fate: Scrapped 1960

General characteristics
- Class & type: Mount McKinley-class Amphibious Command Ship
- Displacement: 12,750 long tons (12,955 t)
- Length: 459 ft 2 in (139.95 m)
- Beam: 63 ft (19 m)
- Draft: 24 ft (7.3 m)
- Speed: 16.4 knots (30.4 km/h; 18.9 mph)
- Complement: 612
- Armament: 2 × 5"/38 caliber guns; 4 × twin 40 mm AA guns

USS Wasatch (AGC-9) was a Mount McKinley-class amphibious force command ship, named after a mountain chain in northern Utah. She was designed as a cargo ship and converted into an amphibious force flagship, a floating command post with advanced communications equipment and extensive combat information spaces to be used by the amphibious forces commander and landing force commander during large-scale operations.

The ship was laid down as Fleetwing, a type C2-S-AJ1 cargo vessel, under a Maritime Commission contract (MC hull 1349) on 7 August 1943 at Wilmington, N.C., by the North Carolina Shipbuilding Company. Fleetwing was launched on 8 October 1943, sponsored by Mrs. P. A. Wilson, and acquired by the Navy on 31 December 1943 for conversion to an amphibious command ship. Renamed Wasatch and designated AGC-9, the ship was converted for naval use at the Norfolk Naval Shipyard, Portsmouth, Va., and commissioned there on 20 May 1944.

== World War II ==
Following sea trials in Chesapeake Bay, Wasatch sailed for the Pacific on 26 June in company with USS Stafford (DE-411) and USS La Prade (DE-409), and transited the Panama Canal on 3 July, bound for New Guinea. The ship reached Milne Bay at 17:25 on 31 July and ten days later, embarked Rear Admiral William Fechteler from USS Blue Ridge (AGC-2). On 7 September, Rear Admiral Daniel E. "Uncle Dan" Barbey, who commanded Task Force (TF) 76, embarked in Wasatch; and the ship got underway for Aitape to join other units of the Morotai-bound task force.

=== 1944 ===
On 15 September, air strikes and surface bombardments softened up the invasion beaches; and American troops splashed ashore to occupy the island. Meanwhile, Wasatch stood off shore and served as the nerve center of the operation. At 18:00, she retired to seaward to await the dawn when she would again close the beach to direct the landing operations. Retaliatory air strikes did not come near the command ship on this occasion, although her war diary notes that a plane was downed ahead in the next group.

Anchoring off Doeroba at 08:30 on the 17th, Admiral Barbey directed operations from Wasatch until he shifted his flag to USS Russell (DD-414) to orchestrate the proceedings from there, from 18:09. A half-hour later, Wasatch, in company with USS McKee (DD-575), got underway for Humboldt Bay.

The AGC remained at Humboldt and prepared for upcoming operations into early October. On the 14th, Vice Admiral Thomas C. Kinkaid broke his flag in Wasatch, as Commander, Task Unit (TU) 77.1.1. On the following day, the ship — with Lt. Gen. Walter Krueger embarked — got underway for the Philippines, to participate in the first act of the dramatic "return" to the Philippine archipelago.

Entering Surigao Strait at 04:55 on the 20th, Wasatch proceeded up Leyte Gulf. Battleships, cruisers, and destroyers commenced bombarding the Leyte beachhead at 09:20 that morning and, some 40 minutes later, the first landing craft were churning towards the beach. Throughout the day, Wasatch stood offshore in a position from which the landings could be observed and served as the nerve center for the operation. From the 20th through the 23rd, the ship retired to sea nightly, in company with USS Nashville (CL-43), USS Ammen (DD-527), and USS Mullany (DD-528).

Enemy air retaliation materialized swiftly in the wake of the American landings; and Wasatch's gunners stood at their weapons, ready to augment the heavy volume of anti-aircraft fire from other Allied ships that fought off the attackers. Anchored off "White Beach" early on the morning of the 25th, those on watch topside in Wasatch saw lightning-like flickerings of gunfire in the distance to the southward, as Rear Admiral Jesse B. Oldendorf's battleships and cruisers crossed the "T" of the Japanese "Southern Force" and in short order annihilated the enemy warships in the Battle of Surigao Strait.

However, the "Southern Force" was not the only one that the Japanese threw against the Allied forces to contest the Leyte invasion. The enemy's "Center Force" — consisting of four battleships and five cruisers, had passed into the Philippine Sea during the night of 24 and 25 October. That group suddenly appeared to Rear Admiral Clifton Sprague's "Taffy 3" escort carrier task group off Samar.

Sprague's six escort carriers and their attending screen fought bravely against overwhelming odds in what became known as the Battle off Samar. While the destroyers and destroyer escorts hurled themselves at the Japanese capital ships and cruisers in suicidal attacks, the "jeep carriers" launched planes.

Capt. Richard F. Whitehead — embarked in Wasatch as Commander, Support Aircraft — immediately ordered all American planes not attacking Japanese shore positions in support of the landings to strike the Japanese ships of the "Center Force." Six Grumman Avengers and 20 Grumman Wildcats from the CVE's nearby responded to the summons and, together with the planes launched from "Taffy 3" under fire, bore in at 08:30 for their first attack.

Ultimately, the heroic defense forced the Japanese "Center Force" to withdraw without damaging the vulnerable transports still unloading off the Leyte beachhead. The victory had not been won without cost. The American forces lost USS Gambier Bay (CVE-73), destroyers Johnston and Hoel, and the destroyer escort, Samuel B. Roberts. They had given their lives to buy time.

At 13:10 on the 25th, the AGC's gunners brought down a Japanese aircraft and helped to down two additional planes the following day. On the 29th, the command ship got underway for New Guinea, in company with a powerful battleship-cruiser force, and, although buffeted by 80-knot winds en route, completed a safe passage to Humboldt Bay at 12:18 on 2 November. Admiral Kinkaid disembarked upon arrival and shifted his flag to headquarters ashore. Rear Admiral Arthur Dewey Struble, commanding Amphibious Group 9, embarked in Wasatch on 3 November and remained in the command ship until transferring to USS Mount McKinley (AGC-7).

On 20 November, Admiral Kinkaid again embarked in Wasatch, and, escorted by USS Lough (DE-586) and USS Daniel A. Joy (DE-585), proceeded to Leyte and anchored in San Pedro Bay on the 25th. There, while intense planning sessions were occurring on board — in preparation for the Lingayen Gulf landings in January of the following year — Rear Admiral James L. Kauffman embarked to establish his temporary headquarters in Wasatch as Commander, Philippine Sea Frontier, from 29 November to 2 December.

=== 1945 ===
While Wasatch was in San Pedro Bay, enemy nuisance air attacks kept all hands constantly on the alert. On 6 January 1945, escorted by USS Smith (DD-378), Wasatch got underway for Lingayen Gulf, Luzon. Japanese suicide aircraft materialized off the coast near Manila; and, as she had done earlier, Wasatch put up a heavy barrage of anti-aircraft fire from every gun in her battery from 20 millimeter to 5 inch. Japanese kamikazes and suicide motorboats flung themselves at the American ships; but, in three days, the fury had largely spent itself.

As American troops consolidated their beachhead at Lingayen, Wasatch, in company with USS Kimberly (DD-521), departed the area on 27 January, bound for Mindoro where she anchored at 05:30 on the 29th. Vice Admiral Kinkaid shifted his flag ashore on 4 February, leaving the command ship temporarily bereft of an embarked flag officer. Rear Admiral Fechteler — who had been the first flag officer who utilized Wasatch as his headquarters — again hoisted flag in the AGC from 7 March to 16 March. Then, Rear Admiral Albert G. Noble broke his flag in her on the 22nd.

Wasatch weighed anchor on 31 March, in company with USCGC Spencer (WAGC-36), USS Newman (APD-59), and USS Cofer (APD-62) and departed Leyte Gulf for Mindoro. On 11 April, Rear Admiral Noble directed a mock landing before directing the "real thing" six days later, as American forces went ashore on sparsely garrisoned Mindanao, while Wasatch stood by at anchor in Polluc Harbor, from the 17th.

Rear Admiral Noble shifted to Spencer on 1 May for landings in southern Mindanao and later used Wasatch as his base when he traveled to and from Manila on important conferences through the end of the month. Shifting to Morotai, the scene of the ship's baptism of fire, Wasatch took part in the staging operations which led to the landings on North Borneo. On 26 June, the command ship, with Rear Admiral Noble embarked, cleared Morotai; and she arrived off the target beachhead on 1 July. While General Douglas MacArthur observed from USS Cleveland (CL-55) and Rear Admiral Barbey watched from USS Phoenix (CL-46), the first wave of Australian troops splashed ashore to encounter light opposition.

Wasatch subsequently returned to Morotai, where Admiral Noble shifted his flag to Spencer on 3 July. Shifting to Humboldt Bay once more, and then to Seeadler Harbor, Manus, in the Admiralties, Wasatch was undergoing general repairs and an overhaul when she received word on 15 August of Japan's surrender.

After V-J Day, Wasatch took part in the occupation of Wakayama and Nagoya, Japan, and Taku, China, into the fall of 1945. Underway from Taku on 7 November 1945, the ship sailed for the United States, via Pearl Harbor, and arrived at San Francisco on 10 December 1945.

Decommissioning at San Diego, California, on 30 August 1946, Wasatch was placed in the San Diego group of the Reserve Fleet in April 1947. Struck from the Navy list on 1 January 1960, the ship was transferred to the Maritime Administration and sold for scrapping to the National Metal and Steel Corporation, of Terminal Island, California.

Wasatch received five battle stars for her World War II service.
