= USS Tinsman =

Rudderow-class destroyer escort

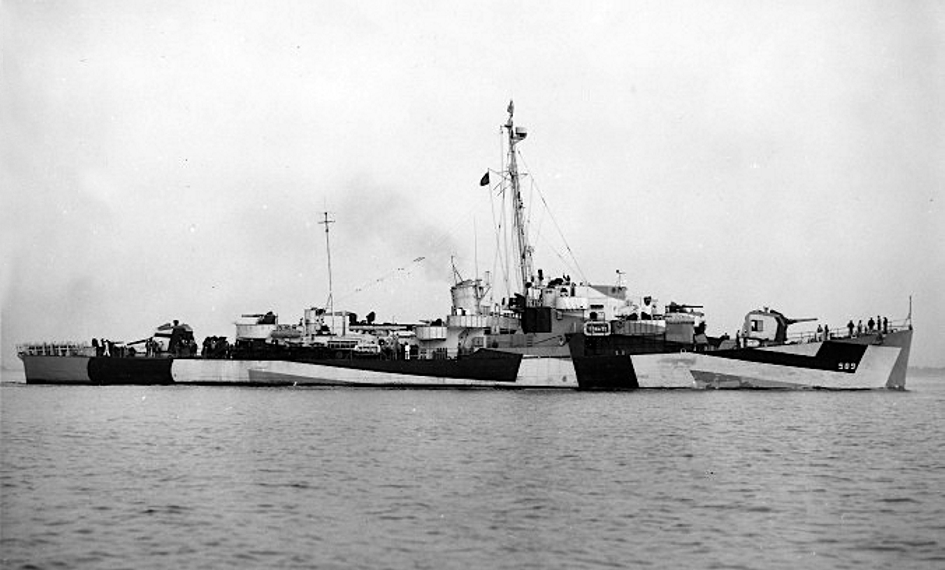

History

United States
- Name: USS Tinsman
- Namesake: Carl Welby Tinsman
- Builder: Bethlehem-Hingham Shipyard
- Laid down: 21 December 1943
- Launched: 26 January 1944
- Sponsored by: Mrs. James Corley, sister of Seaman Tinsman
- Commissioned: 26 June 1944
- Decommissioned: 11 May 1946
- Stricken: 15 May 1972
- Honors and awards: Two battlestars
- Fate: Sold for scrap, 1973

General characteristics
- Class & type: Rudderow
- Type: Destroyer escort
- Displacement: 1,450 tons
- Length: 306 feet
- Beam: 36 feet, 10 inches
- Draft: 9 feet 8 inches
- Speed: 24 knots
- Complement: 186
- Armament: 2 × 5 in/38 cal (127 mm) (2x1); 4 × 40-mm (2x2); 10 × 20 mm (10x1); 3 × 21-inch (533 mm) torpedo tubes (1x3); 1 Hedgehog depth bomb thrower; 8 depth charge projectors (8x1); 2 depth charge racks

USS Tinsman (DE-589) was a Rudderow-class destroyer escort in service with the United States Navy from 1944 to 1946. She was sold for scrapping in 1973.

== Namesake ==
Carl Welby Tinsman was born on 29 March 1924 in Anne Arundel County, Maryland. He enlisted in the United States Naval Reserve on 19 August 1942 and served on the destroyer USS Eberle as a seaman second class. While patrolling some 650 miles (1,050 km) off the coast of Brazil on 10 March 1943, Eberle, USS Santee, USS Savannah and USS Livermore intercepted the German blockade runner Karin, flying a Dutch flag. Eberle and Savannah closed on the ship at flank speed and fired warning shots across her bow. Karins crew promptly set her afire and began to abandon ship. Tinsman was a member of the 14-man party from Eberle which boarded the blazing ship and attempted to save the ship. He continued his efforts to put out the fire until a sudden explosion of a demolition charge killed him. He was posthumously awarded the Silver Star.

== History ==
Tinsman was laid down by the Bethlehem-Hingham Shipyard, Hingham, Massachusetts, on 21 December 1943; launched on 26 June 1944; sponsored by Mrs. James Corley, sister of Seaman Tinsman; and commissioned on 26 June 1944.

Following fitting out and trials, the destroyer got underway on 21 July 1944, proceeded to Bermuda on shakedown, and returned to Boston on 19 August. On 11 October, she departed Boston harbor and, the next day, joined a convoy bound, via the Panama Canal, for the South Pacific. She arrived at Seeadler Harbor in the Admiralty Islands late in November and, after training exercises, headed for New Guinea. On 2 December, she reached Hollandia, and was soon at sea again escorting a convoy to Leyte.

On 14 December, while Tinsman was in San Pedro Bay, a kamikaze plane grazed the bridge of a nearby tanker. A week later, the destroyer escort was back in New Guinea waters, anchoring in Humboldt Bay. The day after Christmas, she was on the move again, this time for waters off the Vogelkop Peninsula of New Guinea for antisubmarine patrol.

In the first days of the new year, she escorted a convoy to San Pedro Bay; then, on 6 January 1945, she departed Leyte to screen a convoy bound for Lingayen Gulf, Luzon. On 12 January—as Tinsman escorted a slow-moving group consisting of an oiler, tugs, and tows—kamikaze planes attacked her convoy. During the day, the American ships fought off four Japanese attackers, downing two of the planes. On the 13th, Tinsman's guns downed another Japanese aircraft. On the 14th, Tinsman anchored in Lingayen Gulf and retired the next day toward Leyte, arr:ving in San Pedro Bay on the 18th to prepare for the Bandings at Nasugbu, Luzon.

Tinsman departed Leyte Gulf on 27 January 1945 with Amphibious Group 8 and, on the 31st, arrived at Nasugbu Bay where troops of the 11th Airborne Division landed without serious opposition. That night a large number of Japanese Shinyo boats attacked the American ships. Armed with impact bombs, these small craft swarmed out of the darkness and attacked USS Lough (DE-586) as she patrolled not far from Tinsman. Tinsman provided illumination to assist Lough in defending herself, sinking at least six of the vessels. Tinsman departed Luzon on 2 February in a convoy bound for Mindoro. Throughout February, she shuttled between Mangarin Bay and Nasugbu Bay on escort duty.

Early in March, she left Leyte Gulf, bound for New Guinea. After taking on stores at Hollandia, Tinsman returned to the Philippines and resumed escort duty. In mid-April, she made a voyage to Palau; and, in July, she varied her routine of convoy duty with visits to Ulithi and Hollandia before returning to the Philippines.

Although the war ended in August, Tinsman remained in the Far East, operating mainly in the Philippines. She also made voyages to Hollandia and Tientsin before setting course for home on 29 November. Steaming via Eniwetok and Pearl Harbor, she arrived at San Pedro, Los Angeles, on 18 December 1945.

She was later berthed at San Diego, where she was placed out of commission on 11 May 1946. On 15 May 1972, her name was struck from the Navy List; and, on 14 September 1973, her hulk was sold to Levin Metals Corporation, San Jose, California, for scrapping.

Tinsman received two battle stars for World War II service.
