= USS Riley =

Rudderow-class destroyer escort

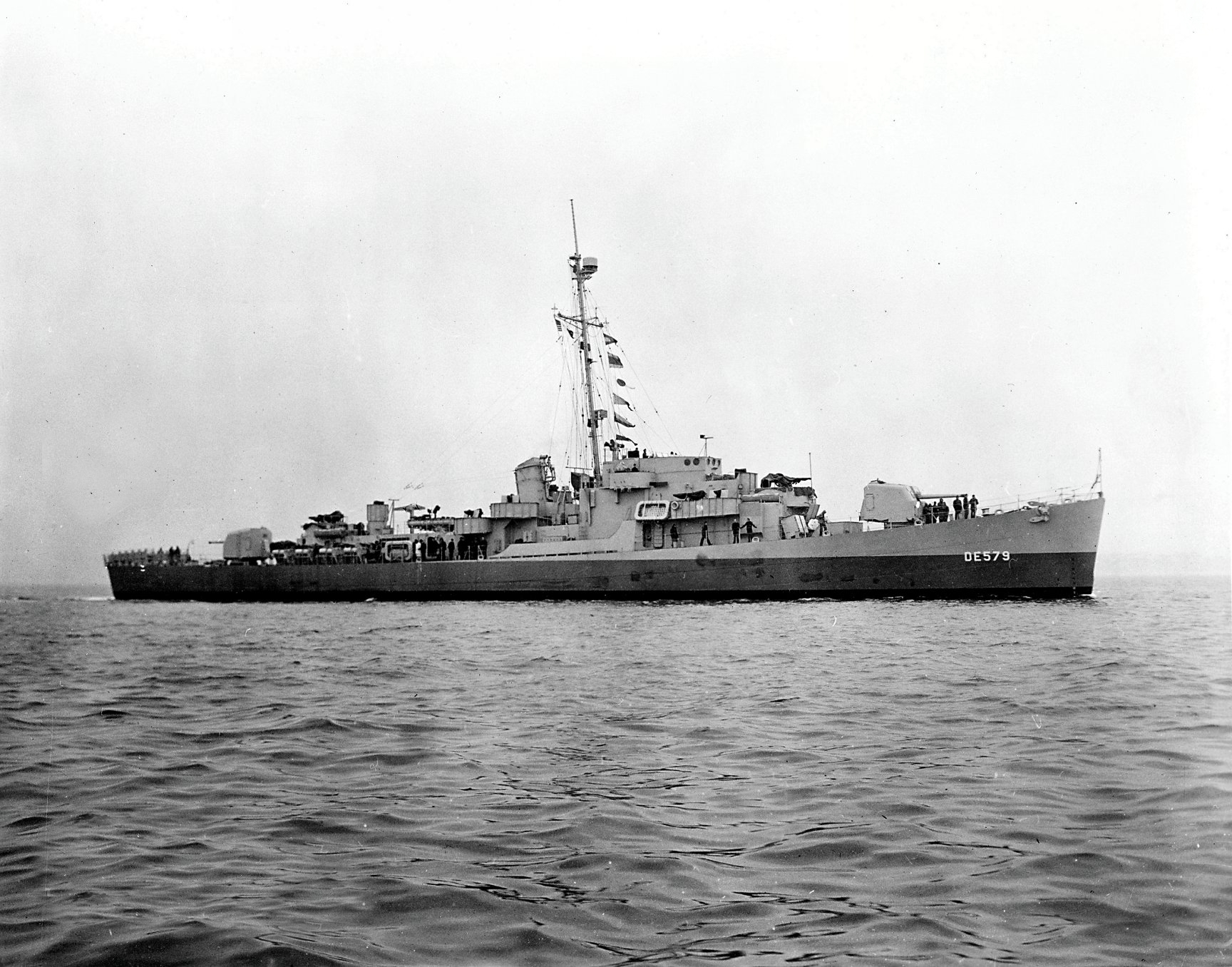

History

United States
- Name: USS Riley (DE-579)
- Namesake: Paul James Riley
- Builder: Bethlehem-Hingham Shipyard
- Laid down: 20 October 1943
- Launched: 29 December 1943
- Sponsored by: Miss Milred LaV. Riley, sister of Lieutenant Riley
- Commissioned: 13 March 1944
- Decommissioned: 15 January 1947
- Stricken: 29 June 1948
- Honors and awards: Two battle stars
- Fate: Transferred to the Republic of China, scrapped 1996,

History

Taiwan
- Name: ROCS Tai Yuan (Chinese: 太原; DE-27)
- Acquired: 10 July 1968

General characteristics
- Class & type: Rudderow
- Type: Destroyer escort
- Displacement: 1,450 tons
- Length: 306 feet
- Beam: 36 feet, 10 inches
- Draft: 9 feet 8 inches
- Speed: 24 knots
- Complement: 186
- Armament: 2 × 5 in/38 cal (127 mm) (2x1); 4 × 40-mm (2x2); 10 × 20 mm (10x1); 3 × 21 inch (533 mm) torpedo tubes (1x3); 1 Hedgehog depth bomb thrower; 8 depth charge projectors (8x1); 2 depth charge racks

USS Riley (DE-579) was a Rudderow-class destroyer escort in the United States Navy during World War II. She later transferred to the Republic of China Navy and served as Tai Yuan (DE-27). The ship was finally scrapped in 1996.

== Namesake ==
Paul James Riley was born on 12 April 1913 at Hot Springs, Arkansas. He enlisted in the United States Naval Reserve on 12 December 1931 and was appointed midshipman on 26 June 1933. Commissioned Ensign 4 years later, he was designated naval aviator on 22 May 1940 and on 28 July he reported for duty with Torpedo Squadron 6 on board USS Enterprise. Promoted to Lieutenant on 6 January 1942, he was awarded the Distinguished Flying Cross for "heroic conduct in aerial combat during the operations of U.S. forces against the Marshall Islands", on 1 February 1942. During the Battle of Midway on 4 June he was killed as he "pressed home his attack" against the Japanese Fleet "in the face of a terrific barrage of antiaircraft fire." He was posthumously awarded the Navy Cross.

== Construction and service ==
=== World War II ===
Riley was laid down 20 October 1943 by Bethlehem-Hingham Shipyard, Inc., Hingham, Massachusetts; launched 29 December 1943; sponsored by Miss Mildred Laverne Riley, sister of ship's namesake. Riley was commissioned 13 March 1944.

Following shakedown exercises off Bermuda, Riley joined CortDiv 67 at Norfolk, Virginia, where until 6 June she trained prospective destroyer escort crews. On 7 June she sailed for New York whence she escorted a convoy back to Norfolk where she readied for her first transatlantic run. Departing Hampton Roads 23 June with convoy UGS-46, she crossed into the Mediterranean Sea on 10 July, fought off a German aerial attack on the 12th, and arrived off Bizerte on the 13th. She returned to the United States 9 August, conducted sonar tests in the New London area until the 29th, then, on the 30th, sailed eastward to escort another Bizerte bound convoy. Back in New York 17 October, she got underway, with her division, for the Pacific Theater 3 November. Steaming via Panama, she reached Bora-Bora on the 25th and continued on to Hollandia, anchoring in Humboldt Bay 11 December.

Between 19 December and 2 January 1945, Riley completed a round-trip escort run to Leyte, then on the 3rd got underway to escort the Lingayen Support Group from New Guinea to Luzon. A unit of Task Group 78.9, she herded her charges through Surigao Strait on the 9th, protected them during a series of kamikaze attacks on the 12th, and on the 13th delivered them to the transport area off the Lingayen Gulf invasion beaches. For the next 2 days, she patrolled to the seaward of the anchorages off Yellow and Orange beaches, then turned south to escort a convoy returning to Leyte. On the 26th, she sailed north again, in the screen of the "Mark VII" assault force. On the 29th, she took the assault force to the landing area in southern Zambales Province, Luzon, then patrolled off the area as the forces began to move inland from the San Felipe-San Narciso-San Antonio beachheads to seal off the Bataan Peninsula and prevent Japanese forces from leaving from Manila to duplicate General Wainwright's 1942 peninsular defense.

Retiring that night, Riley returned to Leyte, whence she conducted interisland escort runs until 20 March. Then heading southeast, she steamed to the Admiralties and the Palaus and returned to the Philippines 5 April. Into July she engaged in further escort work in the Philippines and to New Guinea. On 7 July she departed Hollandia on her initial Okinawan convoy. Arriving on the 23d, she sailed for the Philippines 2 days later. After the mid-August cessation of hostilities, she escorted another convoy to Okinawa, then, after the formal surrender, returned to that island, whence she escorted two occupation troop convoys to Jinsen, Korea.

Riley earned two battle stars during World War II. In mid-October Riley got underway for the United States. Steaming via Pearl Harbor, she arrived at San Diego 5 November and was assigned to the Pacific Reserve Fleet.

=== Postwar ===
Decommissioned 15 January 1947, inactivation was completed 5 February and she joined the mothball fleet at San Diego. Transferred to the Columbia River berthing area in 1957, Riley remained in the Reserve Fleet until transferred to the Republic of China 10 July 1968. The destroyer escort served as ROCS Tai Yuan (DE-27) and was nicknamed "Yang Jr." (Chinese: 小陽字號), a reference to her similar albeit less-numerous armaments as compared to the larger and more-powerful Yang class destroyers also acquired by the ROCN. At the height of her career she was armed (in addition to the 5" guns and original ASW weapons) with two twin 40mm/60 Bofors AA guns, four single 20mm Oerlikon cannons, two Mk 32 triple torpedo tubes, and a Sea Chaparral missile launcher. In the late 1980s she was transferred to the fisheries patrol until paid off in 1992.
