= USS Jobb =

Rudderow-class destroyer escort

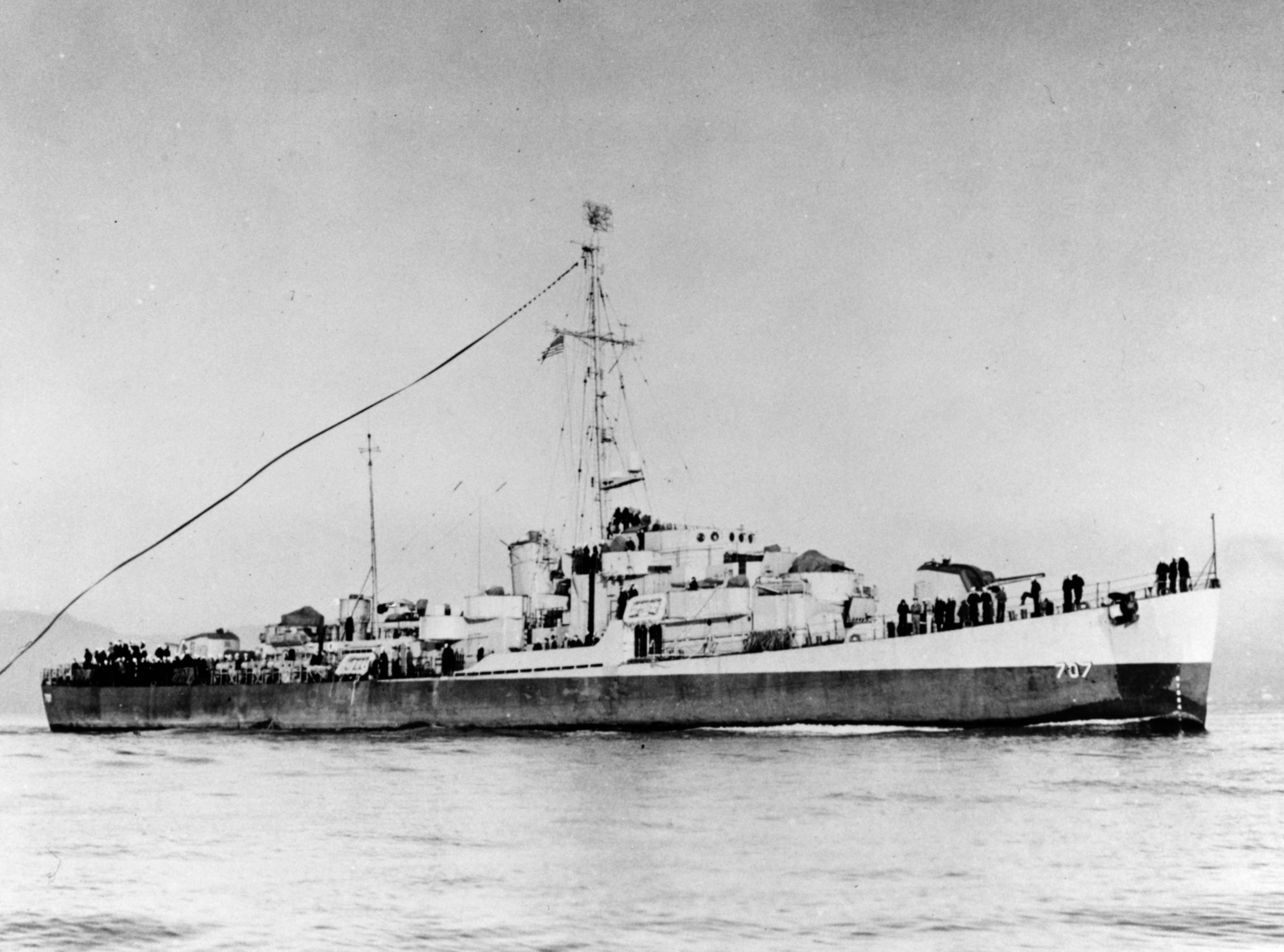

History

United States
- Name: USS Jobb
- Namesake: Richard Patrick Jobb
- Ordered: 1942
- Builder: Defoe Shipbuilding Company, Bay City, Michigan
- Laid down: 20 December 1943
- Launched: 4 March 1944
- Commissioned: 4 July 1944
- Decommissioned: 13 May 1946
- Stricken: 1 November 1969
- Honors and awards: 3 battle stars (World War II)
- Fate: Sold for scrap, October 1970

General characteristics
- Class & type: Rudderow-class destroyer escort
- Displacement: 1,450 long tons (1,473 t) light; 1,673 long tons (1,700 t) standard
- Length: 306 ft (93 m)
- Beam: 37 ft (11 m)
- Draft: 13 ft 9 in (4.19 m)
- Propulsion: Turbo-electric drive; 12,000 hp (8.9 MW)
- Speed: 24 knots (44 km/h; 28 mph)
- Complement: 221
- Armament: 2 × single 5-inch/38-caliber guns; 2 × twin 40 mm guns; 10 × single 20 mm guns; 1 × triple 21 inch (533 mm) torpedo tubes; 1 × Hedgehog anti-submarine mortar; 8 × K-gun depth charge projectors; 2 × depth charge tracks

USS Jobb (DE-707) was a Rudderow-class destroyer escort in service with the United States Navy from 1944 to 1946. She was sold for scrap in 1970.

== History ==
USS Jobb was named after Richard Patrick Jobb, born in McCormick, Washington, on 17 March 1920. He enlisted in the Navy on 28 February 1942. He was at Guadalcanal for America's first amphibious operation of the Pacific War. Hearing a call of a patrol subjected to enemy fire near the Namara River on 26 January 1943, Pharmacist's Mate Third Class Jobb rushed forward 150 yards (140 m) through intense enemy fire to aid the wounded. He continued to dress casualties under fire until he was himself hit and killed. For his courageous devotion to duty, Jobb was posthumously awarded the Silver Star.

Jobb was laid down at Defoe Shipbuilding Company, Bay City, Michigan, on 20 December 1943. She was launched on 4 March 1944, sponsored by Mrs. S. L. Jobb, mother of Pharmacist's Mate Third Class Jobb; and commissioned at New Orleans on 4 July 1944.

=== World War II, 1944–1945 ===
Following her shakedown training off Bermuda, Jobb was assigned to a hunter-killer patrol group in the Atlantic. A hurricane forced her back to Norfolk, Virginia from 13–15 September, after which she steamed to New York to prepare for Pacific service. Jobb sailed on 23 October, and proceeded via the Panama Canal and Bora Bora to Humboldt Bay, New Guinea, where she arrived on 21 November. With the invasion of the Philippines then underway, Jobb escorted a convoy to Leyte Gulf on 28 November. She remained at Leyte until 12 December, when she screened a slow tow convoy for Mindoro. The next day, Japanese snooper aircraft appeared, followed by bombers. In the raids of the next few days, Jobb's gunners shot down at least two of the attackers. After seeing the tows safely to Mindoro, she next sailed via Leyte to New Guinea, where she arrived at Hollandia on 28 December.

The ship joined a convoy for newly assaulted Lingayen Gulf on 8 January 1945; but, after striking a reef in the Philippines on 16 January, she returned to Leyte Gulf for repairs. Following further work on her propellers at Manus, Jobb returned to the Philippines in February to escort convoys carrying troops and supplies. During these critical months, she protected support convoys to Palawan, Mindoro, and Mindanao as the conquest of the Philippines proceeded apace.

Jobb departed Morotai on 4 June to take part in the landings at Brunei Bay, Borneo. She patrolled as troops went ashore on 10 June, and captured the strategic bay without opposition. Later in the month, she screened a resupply convoy from Morotai. She arrived at Leyte on 8 July for repairs before conducting anti-submarine patrol between the Philippines and Ulithi until the close of hostilities.

=== Post-war activities, 1945–1946 ===
The veteran ship steamed to Okinawa on 23 August, and in the months that followed, operated between the various island bases in support of the occupation and reorganization of the Pacific area. Jobb arrived at Pearl Harbor on 31 December, and reached San Francisco on 9 January 1946.

=== Decommissioning ===
She later moved to San Diego, decommissioned there on 13 May 1946, and entered the Pacific Reserve Fleet, berthed at Stockton, California. She was struck from the Naval Vessel Register on 1 November 1969 and sold for scrapping in October 1970.

== Awards ==
- Asiatic–Pacific Campaign Medal with three battle stars
- World War II Victory Medal
- Navy Occupation Medal
- Philippine Presidential Unit Citation
- Philippine Liberation Medal with star
