= USS Coates =

Rudderow-class destroyer escort

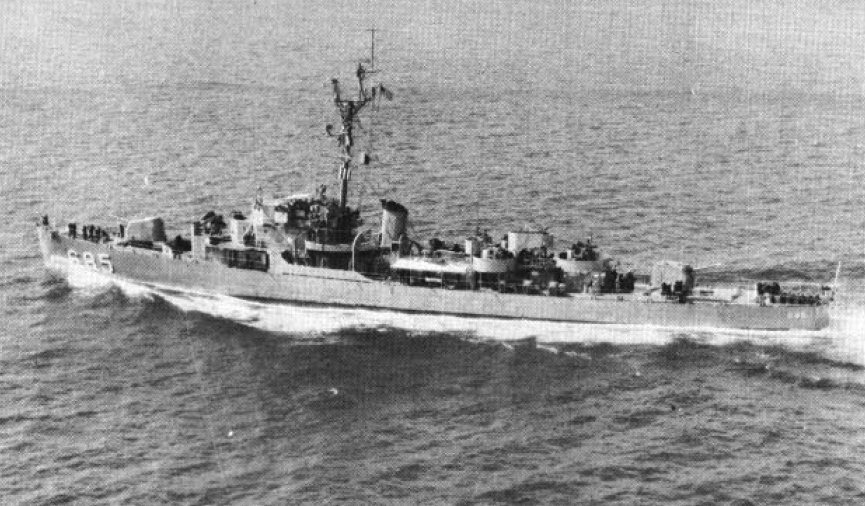
- USS Coates (DE-685) underway c1963

History

United States
- Name: USS Coates
- Namesake: Charles Coates
- Builder: Bethlehem-Hingham Shipyard
- Laid down: 8 November 1943
- Launched: 12 December 1943
- Sponsored by: Mrs. A. M. Bledsoe, wife of Captain Bledsoe
- Commissioned: 24 January 1944
- Recommissioned: 7 February 1951
- Decommissioned: 30 January 1970
- Stricken: 30 January 1970
- Fate: Sunk as target, 19 September 1971

General characteristics
- Class & type: Rudderow
- Type: Destroyer escort
- Displacement: 1,450 tons
- Length: 306 feet
- Beam: 36 feet, 10 inches
- Draft: 9 feet 8 inches
- Speed: 24 knots
- Complement: 186
- Armament: 2 × 5 in/38 cal (127 mm) (2x1); 4 × 40-mm (2x2); 10 × 20 mm (10x1); 3 × 21 inch (533 mm) torpedo tubes (1x3); 1 Hedgehog depth bomb thrower; 8 depth charge projectors (8x1); 2 depth charge racks

USS Coates (DE-685) was a Rudderow-class destroyer escort in the United States Navy during World War II and later in the 1950s and 1960s.

== Namesake ==
Charles Coates was born on 2 June 1912 in Oakland, California. He enlisted in the Navy on 24 September 1930. He served on the USS New York where he was commended by his commanding officer for his seamanship in damage control following an engineering casualty. He was promoted to Carpenter's Mate First Class on 16 August 1940, and on 14 February 1942 was assigned to the USS Juneau. He was killed when Juneau was torpedoed by the Japanese submarine I-26 during the Naval Battle of Guadalcanal on 13 November 1942.

== Construction and service ==
Coates was launched 12 December 1943 by Bethlehem Steel Company, Quincy, Massachusetts; sponsored by Mrs. A. M. Bledsoe, wife of Captain Albert M. Bledsoe, USN; commissioned 24 January 1944 and reported to the Atlantic Fleet.

Coates served as a school ship for student officers and nucleus crews at Miami between 8 April 1944 and 15 September 1945, when she reported at Naval Base Charleston, South Carolina for inactivation. Coates was then placed out of commission in reserve 16 April 1946 at the Naval Inactive Ship Facility at Naval Auxiliary Air Station Green Cove Springs, Florida.

Coates was recommissioned 7 February 1951, and reported to her homeport, Naval Station Norfolk, on 18 March. After coastwise operations and training, she sailed 9 July from Norfolk to Liverpool, Nova Scotia, on hunter-killer exercises, returning 27 July. Training in Cuban waters and local operations preceded assignment as training ship for Fleet Sonar School, Naval Station Key West, Florida in the spring of 1952.

Coates sailed 26 August 1952 to join in North Atlantic Treaty Organization Operation Mainbrace, visiting the Firth of Clyde, the Firth of Forth and Arendal, Norway, before returning home 11 October. Coates resumed local operations, training exercises off the Virginia Capes and at Guantánamo Bay, Cuba, and took part in a midshipman cruise to Brazil in summer 1953. NATO exercises took her to Scotland and France from 12 July to 3 September 1954.

She served as school ship at Key West early in 1957 and on 21 November 1957 was assigned to the 3rd Naval District as a Naval Reserve training vessel, operating from New York City. Through 1963, Coates conducted training cruises of various lengths in Long Island Sound and to ports in the West Indies and along the east coast. Her base was changed from New York to New Haven, Connecticut on 19 September 1960.

She was decommissioned on 30 January 1970 and struck from the Navy list the same day. On 19 September 1971, she was sunk as a target.
