= USS Chaffee =

Rudderow-class destroyer escort

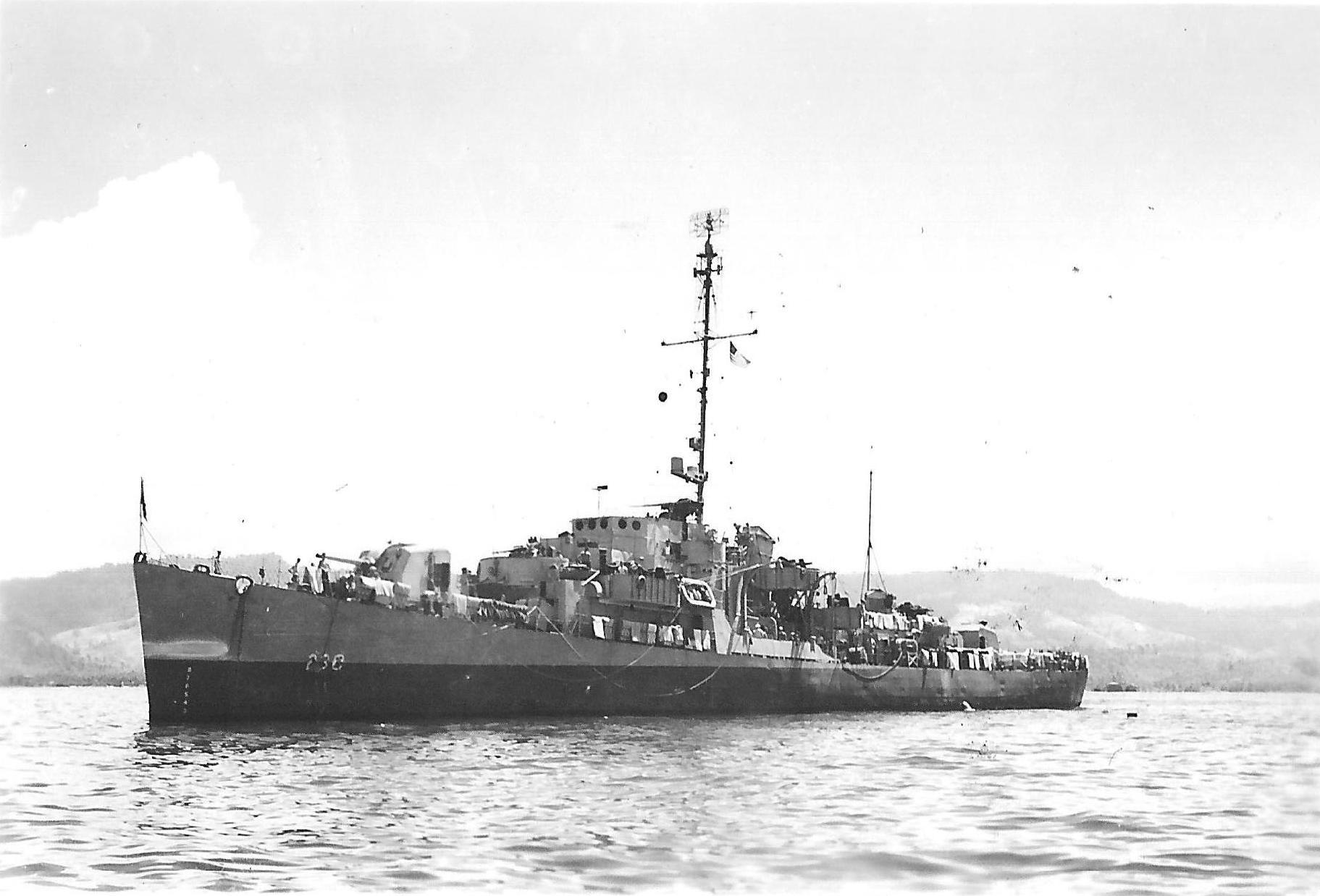
- USS Chaffee (DE-230)

History

United States
- Name: Chaffee
- Namesake: Davis Elliot Chaffee
- Builder: Charleston Navy Yard, South Carolina
- Laid down: 26 August 1943
- Launched: 27 November 1943
- Sponsored by: Mrs. L. C. Chaffee
- Commissioned: 9 May 1944
- Decommissioned: 15 April 1946
- Stricken: 29 June 1948
- Honors and awards: Two battle stars
- Fate: Sold for scrap in 1948

General characteristics
- Class & type: Rudderow-class destroyer escort
- Displacement: 1,450 tons (light) 1,810 tons (full)
- Length: 306 ft (93 m)
- Beam: 36 ft 10 in (11.23 m)
- Draft: 9 ft 8 in (2.95 m)
- Propulsion: General Electric steam turbo-electric drive engine; Two 3-bladed propellers solid manganese-bronze 8 ft 5 in (2.6 m) diameter
- Speed: 24 knots (44 km/h; 28 mph)
- Range: 5,500 nmi (10,200 km; 6,300 mi) at 15 knots (28 km/h; 17 mph)
- Complement: 186
- Armament: 2 × 5 in/38 cal (127 mm) (2x1); 4 × 40-mm (2x2); 10 × 20 mm (10x1); 3 × 21-inch (533 mm) torpedo tubes (1x3); 1 Hedgehog depth bomb thrower; 8 depth charge projectors (8x1); 2 depth charge racks

USS Chaffee (DE-230) was a Rudderow-class destroyer escort in the United States Navy during World War II.

== Namesake ==
Davis Elliott Chaffee was born on 5 May 1915 in Hartland Township, Ohio. He enlisted in the Navy on 4 January 1941, was appointed Ensign on 6 September 1941 and naval aviator on 1 October 1941. While serving with Bombing Squadron 5 based on USS Yorktown, he was killed in action during the Battle of the Coral Sea on 8 May 1942. He was posthumously awarded the Navy Cross.

== Construction and service ==
Chaffee was launched 27 November 1943 by Charleston Navy Yard; sponsored by Mrs. L. C. Chaffee; and commissioned 9 May 1944.

After operating on the east coast as a target ship in submarine training, and as a training ship for prospective escort vessel crews, Chaffee cleared Bayonne, New Jersey, 14 October 1944. She arrived at Hollandia, New Guinea on 21 November for operations in the area screening LSTs, in gunnery and anti-torpedo exercises, and on patrol at the entrance to Aitape.

Chaffee began her role in the battles of the Philippines when she sailed from Hollandia 17 December 1944 to escort landing craft to Leyte. She cleared Hollandia again 8 January 1945 with reinforcements for the recently landed San Fabian Attack Force at Lingayen, where she arrived 21 January. Assigned to patrol in Lingayen Gulf, Chaffee underwent a unique experience on 23 January, when a Japanese Mitsubishi G4M ("Betty") dropped an aerial torpedo which passed through her bow without exploding, or causing any injuries to her crew. (The propeller from the torpedo was recovered in the bow of the ship. It is in the collection of the National Museum of the United States Navy at the Washington Navy Yard, Washington, D.C.) By 2 February, temporary repairs had been completed, and Chaffee returned to patrol duties. She continued to escort convoys in the Philippines, as well as conduct patrols in support of the Mindanao operation until 29 April, when she cleared Parang for Morotai. She returned to the southern Philippines for escort duty 2 May. A week later, she guarded the landing of reinforcements at Davao.

Chaffee arrived at Morotai from the Philippines 19 June 1945 to train for the Borneo operation, and cleared on 28 June to escort reinforcements which landed at Balikpapan 3 July. For the remainder of the war, Chaffee escorted convoys between Morotai and Hollandia and the Philippines. She aided in the establishment of the base in Subic Bay, conducted local patrols and escort missions, and escorted a troop ship to Okinawa in September, then returned to Philippine operations until 10 January 1946, when she cleared Subic Bay for home.

She arrived at San Francisco 5 February, where she was decommissioned 15 April 1946. She was sold 29 June 1948.

Chaffee received two battle stars for World War II service.

After the war, Chaffee was transferred to the California Maritime Academy (Vallejo, CA), as were some of her sister ships transferred to other maritime academies across the country. Unfortunately, the ship did not have the capabilities to carry an entire class of Merchant Marine midshipmen on a training cruise, nor was the vessel suitable for training officers for the commercial maritime industry. In addition, due to the wear and tear of the war-time environment, the hull would have only been usable as a stationary platform. After stripping some engineering equipment off the ship for use in training students, the hulk was sold and towed away for scrap. The proceeds from the sale of the old DE were used to purchase and build a metal "Butler" building to house a machine shop (with some of the machinery from the ship). This metal ("Butler") building is still in use at the academy (2004), now as the auto shop for the cadets.
