= USS Hodges =

Rudderow-class destroyer escort

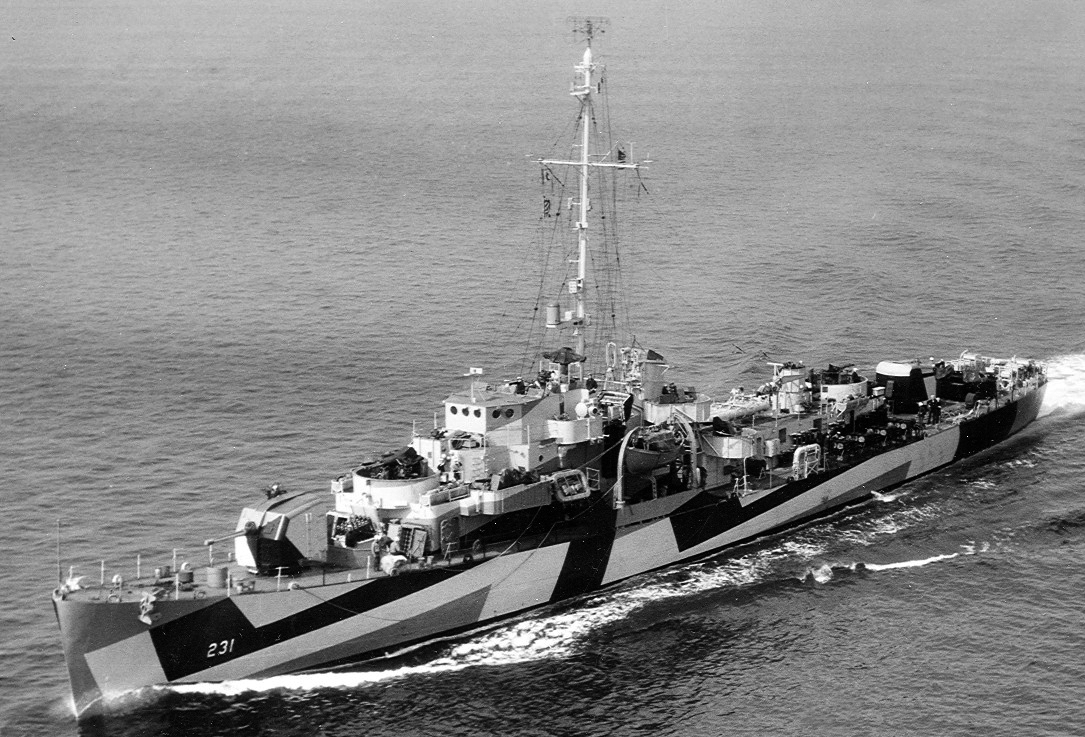

History

United States
- Name: USS Hodges
- Namesake: Flourenoy Glen Hodges
- Builder: Charleston Naval Shipyard
- Laid down: 9 September 1943
- Launched: 9 December 1943
- Sponsored by: Miss Dorothy Jane Hodges, sister of Ensign Hodges
- Commissioned: 27 May 1944
- Decommissioned: 22 June 1946
- Stricken: 29 June 1948
- Honors and awards: One battle star
- Fate: Scrapped, 1973

General characteristics
- Class & type: Rudderow
- Type: Destroyer escort
- Displacement: 1,450 tons
- Length: 306 feet
- Beam: 36 feet, 10 inches
- Draft: 9 feet 8 inches
- Speed: 24 knots
- Complement: 186
- Armament: 2 × 5 in/38 cal (127 mm) (2x1); 4 × 40-mm (2x2); 10 × 20 mm (10x1); 3 × 21 inch (533 mm) torpedo tubes (1x3); 1 Hedgehog depth bomb thrower; 8 depth charge projectors (8x1); 2 depth charge racks

USS Hodges (DE-231) was a Rudderow-class destroyer escort in the United States Navy during World War II.

== Namesake ==
Flournoy Glen Hodges was born on 22 January 1919 in Dover, Georgia. He attended the University of Georgia and entered the United States Naval Reserve on 13 May 1940 at Macon, Georgia. He had preliminary flight training at the Naval Reserve Aviation Base at Miami, and was appointed aviation cadet on 15 August 1940. After more flight training at the Naval Air Station Pensacola and Naval Air Station Miami, he was commissioned an ensign on 15 April 1941 and ordered to a torpedo squadron in the Pacific. He was shot down and reported missing during the Battle of Midway on 4 June 1942. He was posthumously awarded the Navy Cross and promoted to Lieutenant (junior grade) on 15 June 1942.

== Construction and service ==
Hodges was launched 9 December 1943 by the Charleston Navy Yard; sponsored by Miss Dorothy Jane Hodges, sister of Ensign Hodges; and commissioned 27 May 1944.

After shakedown off Bermuda, Hodges returned to Charleston before steaming to the British West Indies for antisubmarine patrol. After more operations along the East Coast, she sailed 14 October 1944 from New York, reaching New Guinea 20 November via the Panama Canal Zone. After operations off New Guinea, Hodges sailed 20 December for the Philippines where she took up antisubmarine patrol and escort duty.

In early January 1945, Hodges sailed with Vice Admiral Daniel E. Barbey's San Fabian Attack Force for the landings at Lingayen Gulf, 9 January. Shortly after 0700, 9 January, as Hodges was on her screening station a kamikaze started a dive on her. Misjudging the target angle, the plane knocked down her foremast and radio antennas and splashed without inflicting a single casualty. Hodges quickly made emergency repairs and continued providing air coverage—thus playing a key role in successfully landing the 6th Infantry Division and General Wing's 43rd Division.

After repairs at Manus Hodges arrived Humboldt Bay, New Guinea, 15 February to escort a convoy to Leyte.

Through the last of March she was assigned patrol and escort duty for convoys bringing in supplies to the Philippines. On 11 April, Hodges conducted shore bombardment on Japanese gun emplacements in the vicinity of Legaspi, Luzon, then for the remainder of April and May operated out of Manila Bay training with submarines.

After more patrol and escort duty out of Subic Bay, Hodges sailed for Ulithi 26 June. From 1 July until 18 December she was assigned patrol and plane guard duty between Ulithi and Okinawa.

Hodges departed Samar 18 December, arriving San Francisco 9 January 1946 via Eniwetok and Pearl Harbor. Hodges decommissioned at San Diego 22 June 1946 and joined the Reserve Fleet.

Hodges received one battle star for World War II service.
