= USS Peiffer =

Rudderow-class destroyer escort

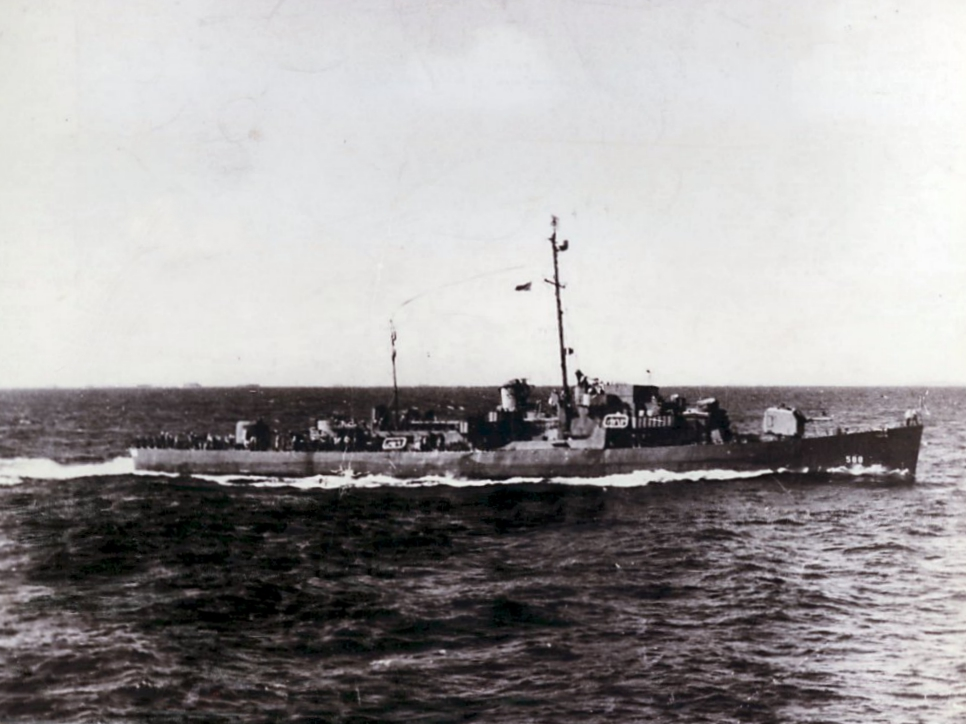

History

United States
- Name: USS Peiffer
- Namesake: Carl David Peiffer
- Builder: Bethlehem-Hingham Shipyard
- Laid down: 21 December 1943
- Launched: 26 January 1944
- Sponsored by: Mrs. Frank W. Peiffer, mother of Ensign Peiffer
- Commissioned: 15 June 1944
- Decommissioned: 1 June 1946
- Stricken: 1 December 1966
- Honors and awards: One battle star
- Fate: Destroyed as a target, 16 May 1967

General characteristics
- Class & type: Rudderow
- Type: Destroyer escort
- Displacement: 1,450 tons
- Length: 306 feet
- Beam: 36 feet, 10 inches
- Draft: 9 feet 8 inches
- Speed: 24 knots
- Complement: 186
- Armament: 2 × 5 in/38 cal (127 mm) (2x1); 4 × 40-mm (2x2); 10 × 20 mm (10x1); 3 × 21-inch (533 mm) torpedo tubes (1x3); 1 Hedgehog depth bomb thrower; 8 depth charge projectors (8x1); 2 depth charge racks

USS Peiffer (DE-588) was a Rudderow-class destroyer escort in service with the United States Navy from 1944 to 1946. She was sold for scrapping in 1967.

== Namesake ==
Carl David Peiffer was born on 18 September 1915 in Wilmington, North Carolina. He enlisted in the United States Naval Reserve on 13 December 1940; was appointed Aviation Cadet on 5 March 1941; and was commissioned Ensign on 25 September 1941. Following training at Naval Air Station Norfolk, he reported for duty with Scouting Squadron 6 on the USS Enterprise on 11 March 1942. He was killed in action during the Battle of Midway on 4 June 1942. He was posthumously awarded the Navy Cross "...for extraordinary heroism and courageous devotion to duty..." exhibited as he "...pressed home his attacks in the face of a formidable barrage of anti-aircraft fire and fierce fighter opposition."

== Construction and service ==
Peiffer was laid down 21 December 1943 by the Bethlehem-Hingham Shipyard, Inc., Hingham, Mass.; launched 26 January 1944; sponsored by Mrs. Frank W. Peiffer, mother of the ship's namesake; and commissioned 15 June 1944.

Following shakedown off Bermuda, Peiffer trained with submarines off southern New England and on 30 September 1944 got underway, with Escort Division 71, for the Panama Canal. She arrived Seeadler Harbor, Manus, 7 November. Steaming then to Hollandia, she escorted a convoy to Leyte and back, and, on 28 December, joined Task Group 78.5 for the invasion of Luzon. Sailing northwest 30 December, she screened the Blue Beach attack group to the San Fabian assault area, then continued to provide anti-submarine arid anti-aircraft protection for the group during the initial landings, 9 January 1945. The following day she retired and on the 13th arrived in Leyte Gulf, whence she escorted LST's carrying supplies and reinforcements to Luzon.

Detached from the 7th Amphibious Force 20 February, Peiffer reported for duty with the Philippine Sea Frontier, with which she remained for the final months of World War II. During that time she interrupted inter-island escort of convoy and anti-submarine patrol duties only once, in late July, to escort USS Block Island (CVE-106) to Guam. Returning to Leyte 10 August, she remained in the Far East after the Japanese surrender and during the next few months patrolled in Philippine waters, escorted convoys to Okinawa, and, prior to sailing for the United States, carried personnel to Shanghai. On 24 November departed the China coast, and after a brief return to the Philippines, steamed east.

Peiffer arrived at San Pedro, Los Angeles, 4 January 1946. In March she shifted to San Diego where she decommissioned, 1 June 1946, and entered the Pacific Reserve Fleet. She was struck from the Navy List 1 December 1966 and her hulk was destroyed as a target 16 May 1967.

Peiffer earned one battle star during World War II.
