= USS Charles J. Kimmel =

Rudderow-class destroyer escort

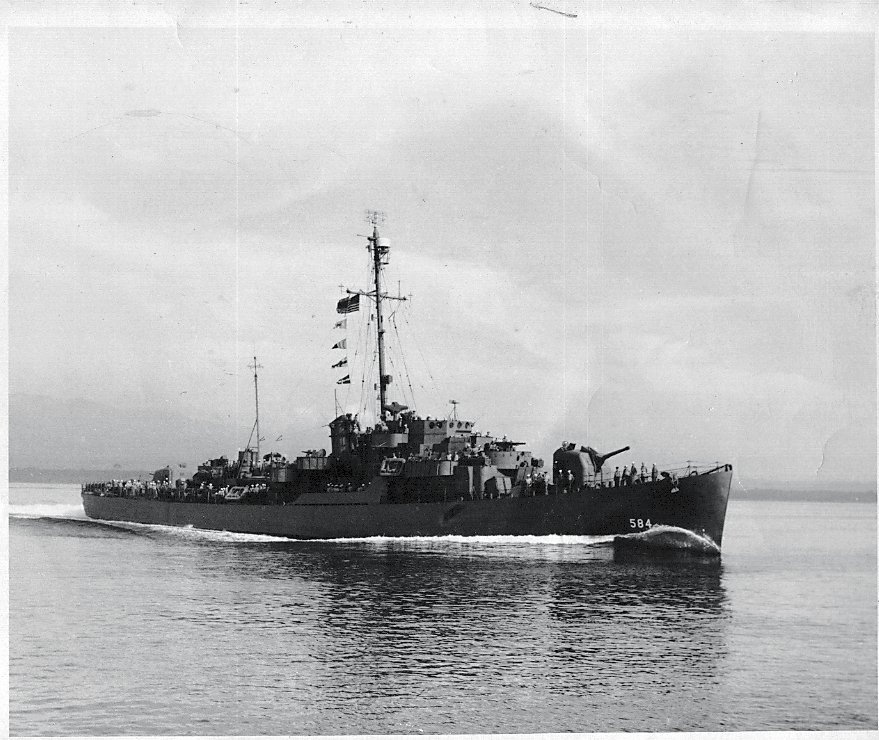

History

United States
- Name: Charles J. Kimmel
- Namesake: Charles J. Kimmel
- Builder: Bethlehem Steel
- Laid down: 1 December 1943
- Launched: 15 January 1944
- Commissioned: 20 April 1944
- Decommissioned: 15 January 1947
- Stricken: 30 June 1968
- Honours and awards: 1 Battle Star
- Fate: Sunk as target, 1 November 1969

General characteristics
- Class & type: Rudderow-class destroyer escort
- Displacement: 1,450 tons (std) 1,810 tons (full)
- Length: 306 ft (93 m) overall, 300 ft (91 m) at the waterline
- Beam: 36 ft 11.5 in (11.265 m)
- Draft: 13 ft 9 in (4.19 m) (max)
- Propulsion: 2 CE boilers, G.E. turbines with electric drive, 12,000 shp (8,900 kW), 2 screws
- Speed: 24 knots
- Complement: 12 officers and 192 enlisted
- Armament: 2-5 in/38 cal Mk30 guns, 4 (2x2) 40 mm Mk1 AA guns, 10 20 mm/70 Mk 4 AA guns, 3 21-inch (533 mm) Mk 15 Torpedo Tubes (3x1), 1 Hedgehog Projector Mk 10 (230 rounds), 8 Mk6 depth charge projectors (40), 2 Mk9 depth charge tracks (60)

USS Charles J. Kimmel (DE-584) was a Rudderow-class destroyer escort serving in the US Navy from 1944 through 1947. She served in both the Atlantic and Pacific theaters of World War II. Charles J. Kimmel was laid down by Bethlehem Steel in Hingham, Massachusetts on 1 December 1943 and launched on 15 January 1944. She was commissioned 20 April 1944. The vessel was decommissioned on 15 January 1947, stricken 30 June 1968 and ultimately sunk as target off California, on 13 November 1969.

== Namesake ==
Charles Jack Kimmel was born on 2 July 1918 in Rushsylvania, Ohio. He enlisted in the United States Marine Corps 29 October 1941 and was commissioned as a Second lieutenant on 31 January 1942. He was killed in action near the Matanikau River on Guadalcanal on 2 November 1942 while leading his platoon in a bayonet charge. He was posthumously awarded the Navy Cross.

== Atlantic Duty ==
Charles J. Kimmel escorted coastwise convoys between Norfolk, Virginia and New York City until August 1944. On 2 August she sailed to guard the passage of a convoy to Oran, where she was ordered to sail independently escorting a transport to Naples, both of these movements in support of the recent assault on southern France. She rejoined her original escort group at Oran on 26 August, and returned to Boston, Massachusetts on 18 September. Here she received repairs, and Pacific-type camouflage.

== Pacific duty ==
Charles J. Kimmel transited the Panama Canal arriving at Manus on 7 November 1944. On 20 November, she sailed for Hollandia to join the group escorting a reinforcement convoy to Leyte. She returned to New Guinea to prepare for the assault on Lingayen. On 28 December she put to sea as part of the San Fabian Attack Force, coming under air attack with her force on 6, 7, and 8 January 1945 as the huge amphibious fleet sailed north. Her guns joined the anti-aircraft barrage shielding the vulnerable transports and landing craft then and during the assault on 9 January.

The destroyer escort continued to operate in the Philippines though the remainder of the war, escorting convoys from New Guinea to Leyte and Lingayen as well as within the Philippine Archipelago. Twice she screened shipping to the Palaus. From 2 June, she served with the local naval defense force in Davao Gulf, providing communications for naval forces ashore as well as performing air-sea rescue missions. On the first day of her new assignment, she dashed under the guns of enemy-held Auqui Island to rescue 22 survivors of a downed Air Force transport. Charles J. Kimmel aided Filipino troops in their mop-up activities by bombarding Piso Point to dislodge approximately 600 Japanese soldiers.

In September 1945, Charles J. Kimmel escorted a convoy to Okinawa, returning to patrol duties in the Philippines until 29 November, when she hoisted the homeward-bound pennant at Samar. She arrived in San Diego 18 December 1945, and there was placed out of commission in reserve 15 January 1947. Charles J. Kimmel received one battle star for World War II service.

== Military awards and honors ==
American Campaign Medal
Asiatic–Pacific Campaign Medal (with one bronze service star)
World War II Victory Medal
Philippine Liberation Medal
