= USS McNulty =

Rudderow-class destroyer escort

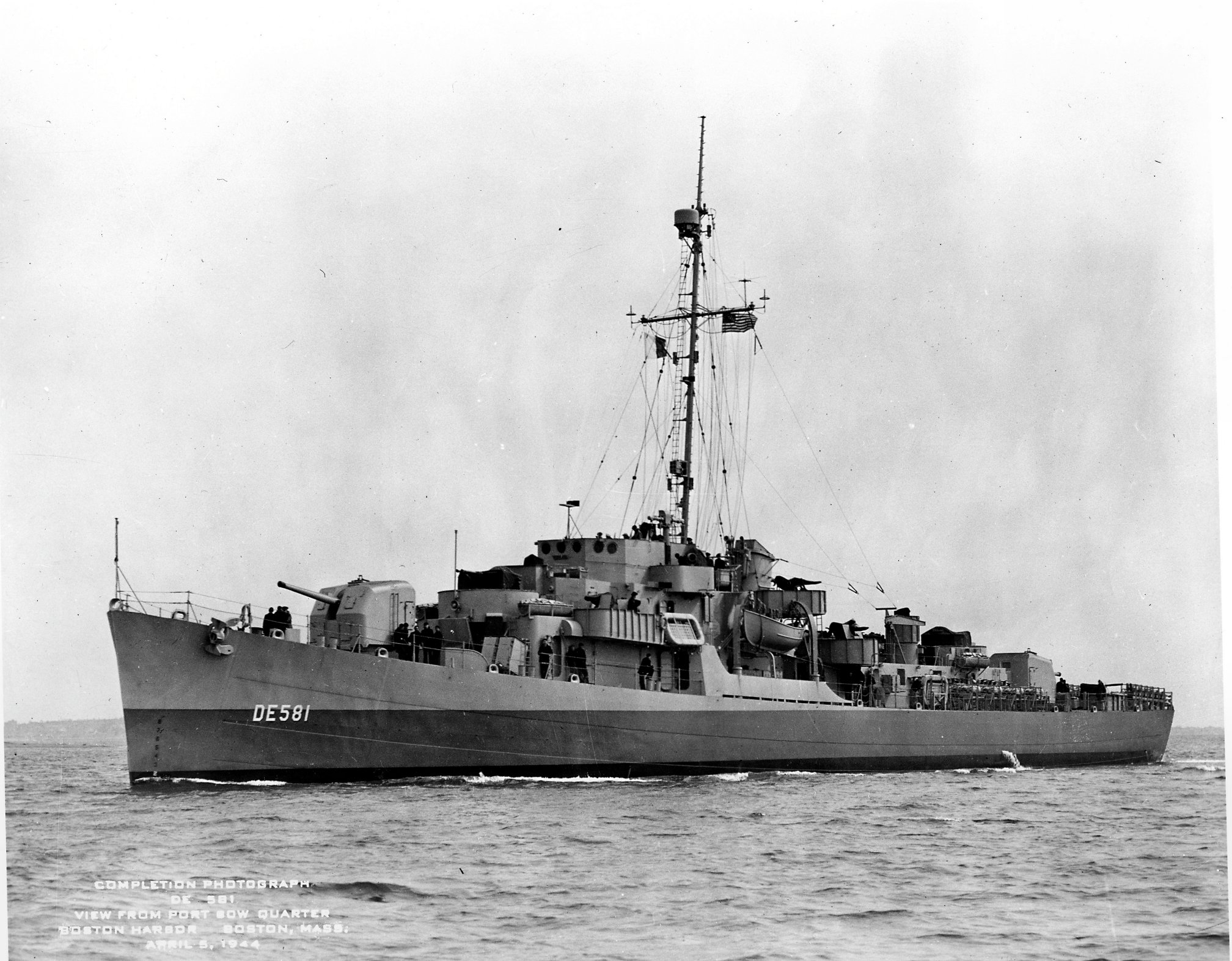

History

United States
- Name: USS McNulty
- Namesake: John Thomas McNulty
- Builder: Bethlehem-Hingham Shipyard
- Laid down: 17 November 1943
- Launched: 8 January 1944
- Sponsored by: Mrs. Helen K. McNulty
- Commissioned: 31 March 1944
- Decommissioned: 2 July 1946
- Honors and awards: Two battle stars
- Fate: Sunk as target 16 November 1972

General characteristics
- Class & type: Rudderow
- Type: Destroyer escort
- Displacement: 1,450 tons
- Length: 306 feet
- Beam: 36 feet, 10 inches
- Draft: 9 feet 8 inches
- Speed: 24 knots
- Complement: 186
- Armament: 2 × 5 in/38 cal (127 mm) (2x1); 4 × 40-mm (2x2); 10 × 20 mm (10x1); 3 × 21 inch (533 mm) torpedo tubes (1x3); 1 Hedgehog depth bomb thrower; 8 depth charge projectors (8x1); 2 depth charge racks

USS McNulty (DE-581) was a Rudderow-class destroyer escort in the United States Navy during World War II.

== Namesake ==
John Thomas McNulty was born on 23 April 1897 at Philadelphia, Pennsylvania. He enlisted in the Navy on 14 August 1917 for World War I service, until discharged 7 August 1919. He reenlisted 15 July 1920 for the period to 10 July 1924, and after his third enlistment, 29 July 1924, served continuously until his death. Commissioned Ensign on 3 November 1941, he was promoted to Lieutenant (junior grade) on 15 June 1942. He was killed in action on the USS Astoria during the Battle of Savo Island on 9 August 1942.

== History ==
McNulty was laid down 17 November 1943 by Bethlehem-Hingham Shipyard, Inc., Hingham, Massachusetts; launched 8 January 1944; sponsored by Mrs. Helen K. McNulty; and commissioned 31 March 1944.

After shakedown off Bermuda, McNulty trained along the east coast until leaving Chesapeake Bay on escort duty with UGS‑46 to Bizerte, Tunisia. Her guns helped drive off an attacking German bomber 12 July 1944, and her convoy safely reached Bizerte 2 days later. Following another convoy mission to New York City, she made a similar crossing from Norfolk, Virginia to Tunisia to New York, then sailed with Cort Div 67 for the Pacific 3 November.

Arriving in Hollandia, New Guinea, 17 December, McNulty joined the 7th Fleet. Her first convoy escort mission was to Leyte, 19 December to 2 January 1945. In less than 24 hours she sortied with Task Group 78.9, the 2nd Lingayen Supply Group, and with it underwent a series of kamikaze attacks off Luzon 12 January 1945. Two merchantmen were damaged, and more than 100 soldiers aboard one of these were killed. McNulty safely reached Lingayen Gulf 13 January, then escorted ships back to Leyte, arriving 19 January.

McNulty patrolled off Luzon 29 January as the San Narciso Attack Force carried out the landings which spearheaded the drive to take Manila. She continued patrol and escort duty in the Philippines and to the Admiralties, New Guinea, and Okinawa under the operational control of the Philippines sea frontier until the close of the war.

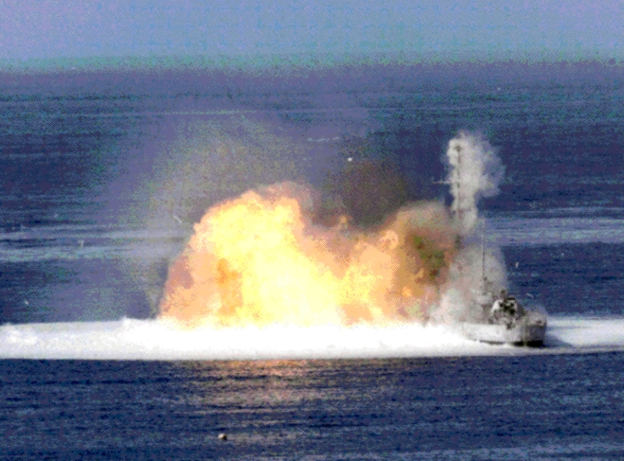
USS McNulty being sunk in 1972.

McNulty sailed from Subic Bay 1 September to support occupation operations, first escorting Relief from Okinawa to Korea, then cruised the China coast before sailing for home from Okinawa 14 October.

She arrived San Diego 5 November, decommissioned there 2 July 1946, and entered the Pacific Reserve Fleet, where she remained at least into 1969. She was finally sunk as a target on 16 November 1972 off the coast of California, using a fuel-air explosive bomb.

McNulty received two battle stars for World War II service.

== See also ==
- List of destroyer escorts of the United States Navy
