= USS George A. Johnson =

Rudderow-class destroyer escort

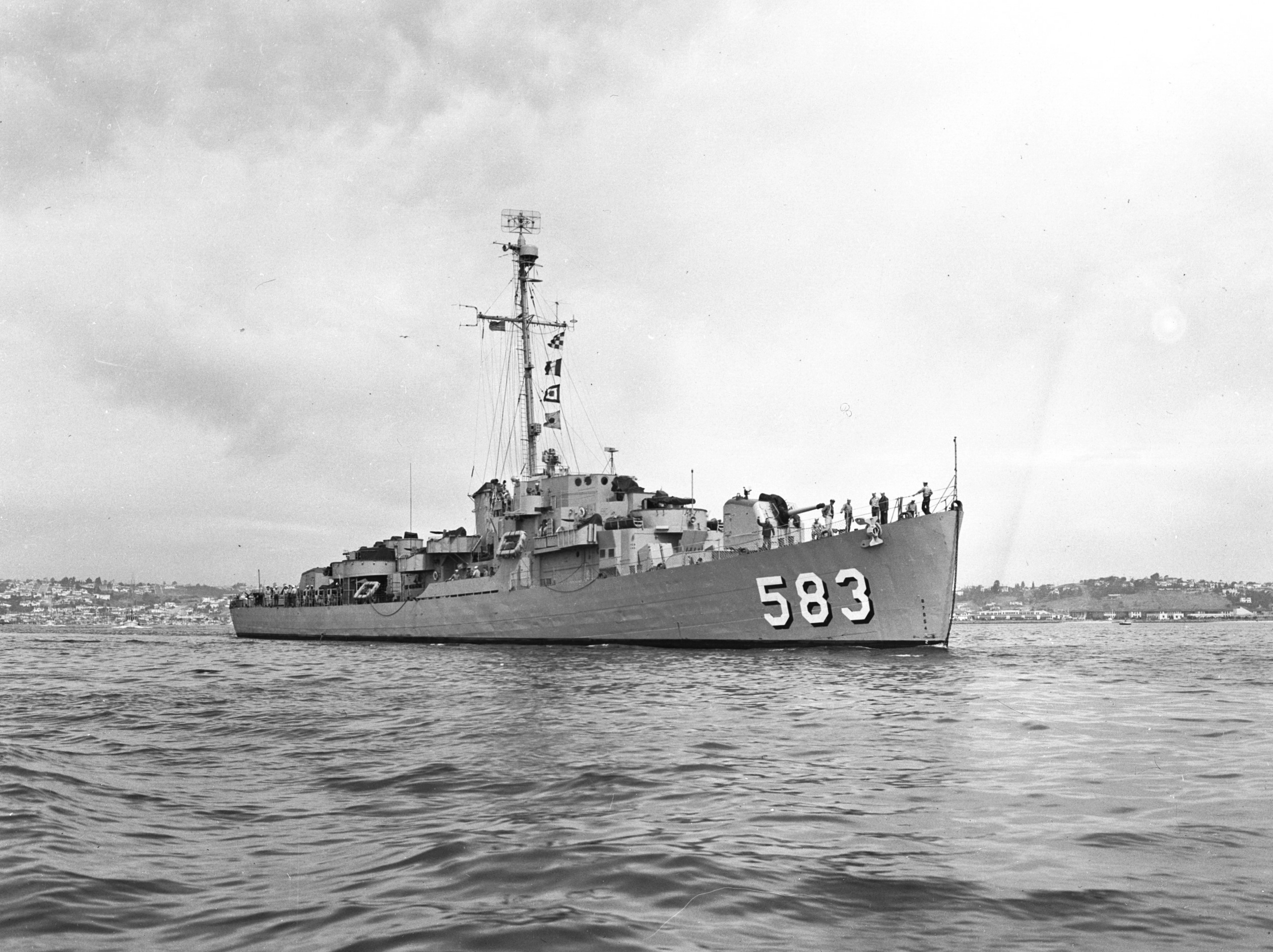

History

United States
- Name: USS George A. Johnson
- Namesake: George A. Johnson
- Builder: Bethlehem Hingham Shipyard
- Laid down: 24 November 1943
- Launched: 12 January 1944
- Sponsored by: Mrs. Alfred R. Johnson, mother of Private Johnson
- Commissioned: 15 April 1944
- Recommissioned: 29 September 1950
- Decommissioned: September 1957
- Stricken: 1 November 1965
- Fate: Sold for scrap

General characteristics
- Class & type: Rudderow
- Type: Destroyer escort
- Displacement: 1,450 tons
- Length: 306 feet
- Beam: 36 feet, 10 inches
- Draft: 9 feet 8 inches
- Speed: 24 knots
- Complement: 186
- Armament: 2 × 5 in/38 cal (127 mm) (2x1); 4 × 40-mm (2x2); 10 × 20 mm (10x1); 3 × 21 inch (533 mm) torpedo tubes (1x3); 1 Hedgehog depth bomb thrower; 8 depth charge projectors (8x1); 2 depth charge racks

USS George A. Johnson (DE-583) was a Rudderow-class destroyer escort serving with the United States Navy from 1944 to 1946. From 1946 to 1957, she was used as a Navy Reserve training ship. She was scrapped in 1966.

== Namesake ==
George Alfred Johnson was born on 26 September 1922 in Fleetwood, Pennsylvania. He enlisted in the United States Marine Corps on 28 January 1942. He served at Marine Corps Recruit Depot Parris Island and Marine Corps Base Quantico, before sailing for the Pacific in April 1942. Attached to the 1st Marine Raider Battalion, Private Johnson participated in the invasion of Tulagi, Solomon Islands on 7 August 1942. During mopping-up operations 2 days later, his squad came under rifle fire from a sniper's nest in a nearby cave. He rushed to the mouth of the cave and continued to throw in grenades until he was killed, allowing his squad to advance. He was posthumously awarded the Silver Star.

== Construction and service ==
George A. Johnson was laid down by Bethlehem Hingham Shipyard, Hingham, Massachusetts, 24 November 1943; launched 12 January 1944; sponsored by Mrs. Alfred R. Johnson, Private Johnson's mother; and commissioned 15 April 1944.

After shakedown off Bermuda, George A. Johnson departed New York 24 June 1944 to escort a convoy bound for Bizerte, Tunisia. Despite several encounters with German aircraft off the North African coast, the convoy reached Bizerte 14 July. She then returned to New York for exercises and upkeep before departing Norfolk 2 September and joining another Mediterranean-bound convoy. This time the ships steamed to Palermo, Sicily, arriving 23 September. She next joined a westbound convoy 28 September and arrived New York 17 October.

After preparing for duty in the Pacific, she departed New York 3 November and steamed via the Panama Canal to Hollandia, New Guinea, where she arrived 24 December. George A. Johnson escorted supply convoys from New Guinea to Allied bases in the Philippines. Departing Mois Woendi 4 January 1945, she joined cargo ships bound for Lingayen Gulf, Luzon. Four kamikaze planes attacked the convoy 12 January; but, under the cover of antiaircraft fire of George A. Johnson and other escorts, the entire convoy reached Lingayen Gulf the next day.

George A. Johnson engaged in patrol and convoy duties in the Philippines until 26 January 1945, when she supported landings at San Antonio, Luzon. After this operation, she resumed convoy escort duty out of Leyte Gulf, steaming to Ulithi, Hollandia, and Manus. Arriving Hollandia from Leyte Gulf 27 April, she remained there until August.

Returning to the Philippines after the Japanese surrender, George A. Johnson departed Manila 4 September for Jinsen, Korea, to join Admiral Thomas C. Kinkaid in USS Rocky Mount (AGC-3). The force then set course for the Yangtze River 15 September and on 19 September were the first American ships since 1941 to enter this river. Continuing to Shanghai, George A. Johnson and other units of the 7th Fleet aided in the reoccupation of Shanghai and establishment of the Yangtze Patrol.

Her war service completed, George A. Johnson departed for Okinawa 11 October. From there she steamed via Pearl Harbor to San Diego, arriving 5 November. She remained at San Diego and decommissioned 31 May 1946.

In August, however, she was assigned to the 12th Naval District as a training ship. She served out of commission in this capacity until 29 September 1950 when she was placed in commission in reserve as a training ship. Until late 1957 George A. Johnson trained reservists, making occasional cruises off the California coast. She decommissioned in September 1957 and entered the Pacific Reserve Fleet at Mare Island, California. Her name was struck from the Navy Directory 1 November 1965 and she was sold for scrap.

While being towed to San Diego for scrapping on the night of 12/13 October 1966, the George A. Johnson broke free from her tow cable and ran aground at Sharp Park Beach, Pacifica, California. After attempts to refloat her proved unsuccessful, she was cut up and scrapped onsite over a period of six months.

== See also ==
- List of destroyer escorts of the United States Navy
