= USS Metivier =

Rudderow-class destroyer escort

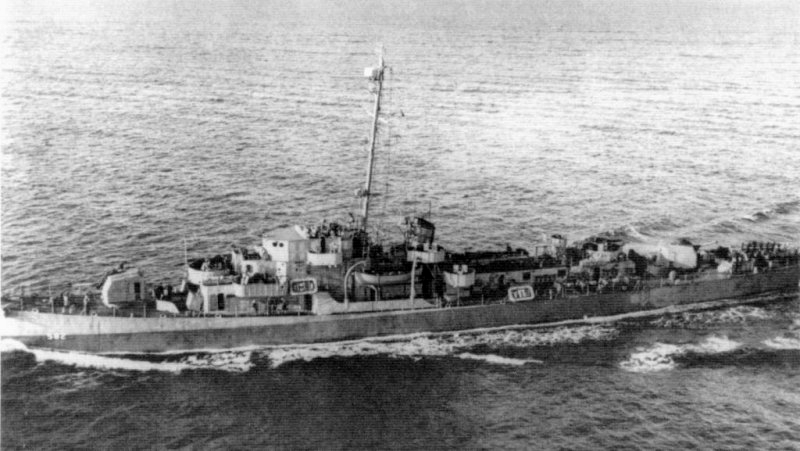

History

United States
- Name: USS Metivier
- Namesake: Joseph Metivier
- Builder: Bethlehem-Hingham Shipyard
- Laid down: 24 November 1943
- Launched: 12 January 1944
- Commissioned: 7 April 1944
- Decommissioned: 1 July 1946
- Stricken: 30 June 1968
- Honors and awards: Three battle stars
- Fate: Sold for scrap

General characteristics
- Class & type: Rudderow
- Type: Destroyer escort
- Displacement: 1,450 tons
- Length: 306 feet
- Beam: 36 feet, 10 inches
- Draft: 9 feet 8 inches
- Speed: 24 knots
- Complement: 186
- Armament: 2 × 5 in/38 cal (127 mm) (2x1); 4 × 40-mm (2x2); 10 × 20 mm (10x1); 3 × 21-inch (533 mm) torpedo tubes (1x3); 1 Hedgehog depth bomb thrower; 8 depth charge projectors (8x1); 2 depth charge racks

USS Metivier (DE-582) was a Rudderow-class destroyer escort in service with the United States Navy from 1944 to 1946. She was sold for scrapping in 1969.

== Namesake ==
Joseph Erene Henry Metivier was born on 25 February 1920 in Plainfield, Connecticut. He enlisted in the Navy at New Haven, Connecticut on 17 September 1940. He was on board the USS Eberle when it intercepted German blockade runner Karin in the South Atlantic on 10 March 1943. One of a 14‑man boarding party from Eberle attempting to salvage the ship, he was killed when demolition charges set by the Germans exploded. Coxswain Metivier was posthumously awarded the Silver Star.

== Construction and service ==
Metivier was laid down by Bethlehem-Hingham Shipyard, Inc., Hingham, Massachusetts, 24 November 1943; launched 12 January 1944; sponsored by Mrs. Joseph Metivier, mother of Coxswain Metivier; and commissioned 7 April 1944.

Metivier departed Boston Navy Yard 3 June for Norfolk, Virginia, arriving 2 days later for schoolship duty. On the 23rd the escort got underway from Norfolk escorting a convoy of 91 ships to North Africa, arriving off Bizerte, Tunisia, 14 July. In August she returned to the east coast, entering Norfolk channel the 31st. On 1 September she began another voyage to the Mediterranean Sea, ending at New York City 17 October.

Assigned to the 7th Fleet, Metivier steamed from New Jersey, 3 November for New Guinea, via the Panama Canal; Bora Bora, Societies; and Guadalcanal, Solomons, reaching Hollandia on 11 December. She then began 8 months of escort, supply, patrol, and screen duty. The escort ship supported the landings at Lingayen Gulf (9 January) and Subic Bay (29 January) in the Philippines and the invasion of Okinawa beginning 4 May, among other operations in the South Pacific ultimately leading to the Japanese surrender 14 August.

Detached from the Philippine Sea Frontier 31 August, Metivier got underway with Task Group 70.3 for Okinawa, reporting at Buckner Bay 5 September for escort service to and from Jinsen (now Incheon), Korea. In late October, she steamed for the west coast, via Pearl Harbor, Hawaii, arriving San Diego, California on 8 November.

That same day she reported to the 16th (Inactive Reserve) Fleet there. She decommissioned 1 June 1946 and in January 1947 entered the Pacific Fleet at San Diego. By 1 January 1959 Metivier had moved to the berthing area at Stockton, California. On 30 June 1968, Metivier was struck from the Naval Register and was prepared to be sold for scrap.

Metivier received three battle stars for World War II service.
