= Rudderow-class destroyer escort =

Class of American destroyer escorts

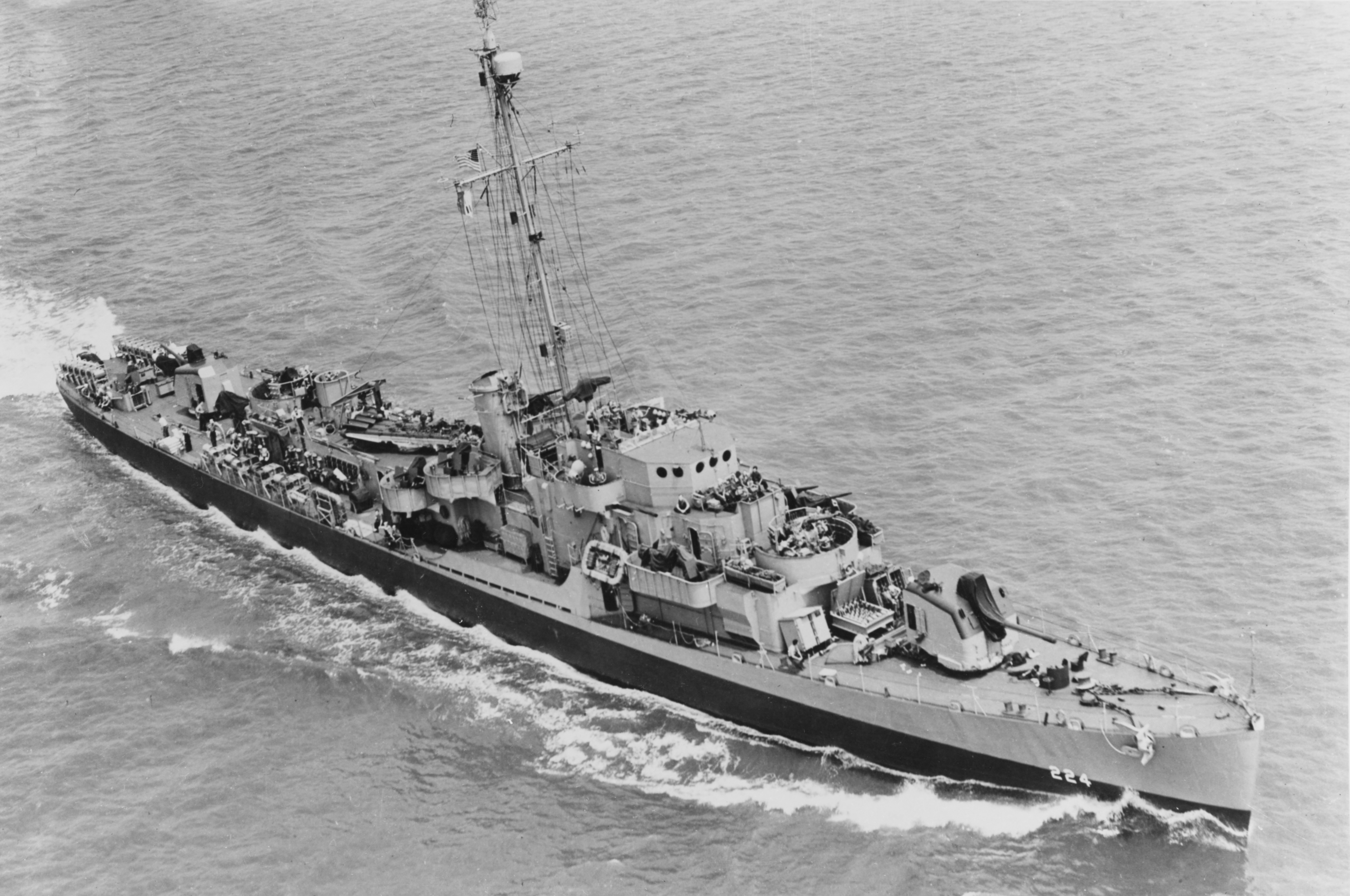
- USS Rudderow

Class overview
- Name: Rudderow class
- Builders: Bethlehem Hingham, MA; Bethlehem Fore River, MA; Charleston Navy Yard, SC; Defoe Shipbuilding, MI; Philadelphia Navy Yard, PA
- Operators: United States Navy; Republic of China Navy; Colombian National Navy; Republic of Korea Navy; Mexican Navy
- Preceded by: Edsall class
- Succeeded by: John C. Butler class
- Built: 1943–1944
- In commission: 1943–1992
- Planned: 252
- Completed: 72
- Cancelled: 180
- Preserved: 1

General characteristics
- Type: Destroyer escort
- Displacement: 1,740 tons (1,770 metric tons) (fully loaded)
- Length: 306 ft (93.3 m) (overall)
- Beam: 36 ft 6 in (11.1 m)
- Draft: 11 ft (3.4 m) (fully loaded)
- Propulsion: General Electric steam turbo-electric drive engine; Two 3-bladed propellers 8 ft 5 in (2.6 m) diameter
- Speed: 24 knots (most ships could attain 26/27 knots)
- Range: 5,500 nautical miles at 15 knots (10,200 km at 28 km/h)
- Complement: 15 Officers, 168 Enlisted
- Sensors & processing systems: Radar: Type SL surface search on mast above yard arm (type SC and SA air search fitted to certain ships).; Sonar: Type 128D or Type 144 both in retractable dome..; Direction Finding: MF antenna in front of the bridge and HF/DF Type FH 4 antenna fitted on mast.
- Armament: 2 × 1 5 in (127 mm)/38 dual-purpose gun; 2 × 2 40 mm Bofors in the 'B' and 'X' position.; 10 × 1 20 mm Oerlikon cannons, four either side of the bridge, four in sponsons abaft the funnel, two on the fantail; Torpedo tubes: three 21-inch (533 mm) torpedo tubes aft of the stack.; Hedgehog: anti-submarine mortar, on the main deck aft of 'A' gun.; Depth charges: Two double rails at the stern and eight K-gun throwers.

The Rudderow-class destroyer escorts were destroyer escorts launched in the United States in 1943 to 1945. Of this class, 21 were completed as destroyer escorts, and 51 were completed as Crosley-class high speed transports and were re-classified as high speed transport APDs. One ship was converted to an APD after completion. They served in World War II as convoy escorts and anti-submarine warfare ships.

== History ==
The lead ship was USS Rudderow which was launched on 14 October 1943. The ships had General Electric steam turbo-electric drive engines. The ships were built at various shipyards in the United States, including the Philadelphia Navy Yard and Defoe Shipbuilding Company. They were very similar to the Buckley class, having the same hull and machinery. The main differences were the Rudderows had two 5-inch (127 mm) enclosed guns and two twin-40 mm mounts, instead of the three 3-inch (76 mm) open guns and one twin-40 mm or one quad 1.1-inch (28 mm) mount of the Buckleys. Another major difference is the style of the configuration of the area of the bridge and pilothouse which is low and enclosed compared to the Buckley Class which is tall and enclosed. The Rudderow Class is similar to the John C. Butler class in this case and a distinguishing feature between these two class DEs is the size and number of the portholes in the pilothouse. The Rudderow class has seven 18-inch portholes and the John C. Butler class has ten 12-inch portholes, with both classes having three portholes facing the bow. The class was also known as the TEV type from their Turbo-Electric drive and 5-inch (V) guns.

The final 180 of the class were canceled near the end of the war. After World War II, some of the surviving units of this class were transferred to Taiwan, South Korea, Colombia, Mexico. The rest were retained by the US Navy's reserve fleet until they were decommissioned. The USS Ruchamkin, sold to the Colombian Navy and renamed to the ARC Córdoba (DT 15), is the sole survivor of her class and is preserved at the Jaime Duque amusement park at Tocancipá, near Bogotá in Colombia.

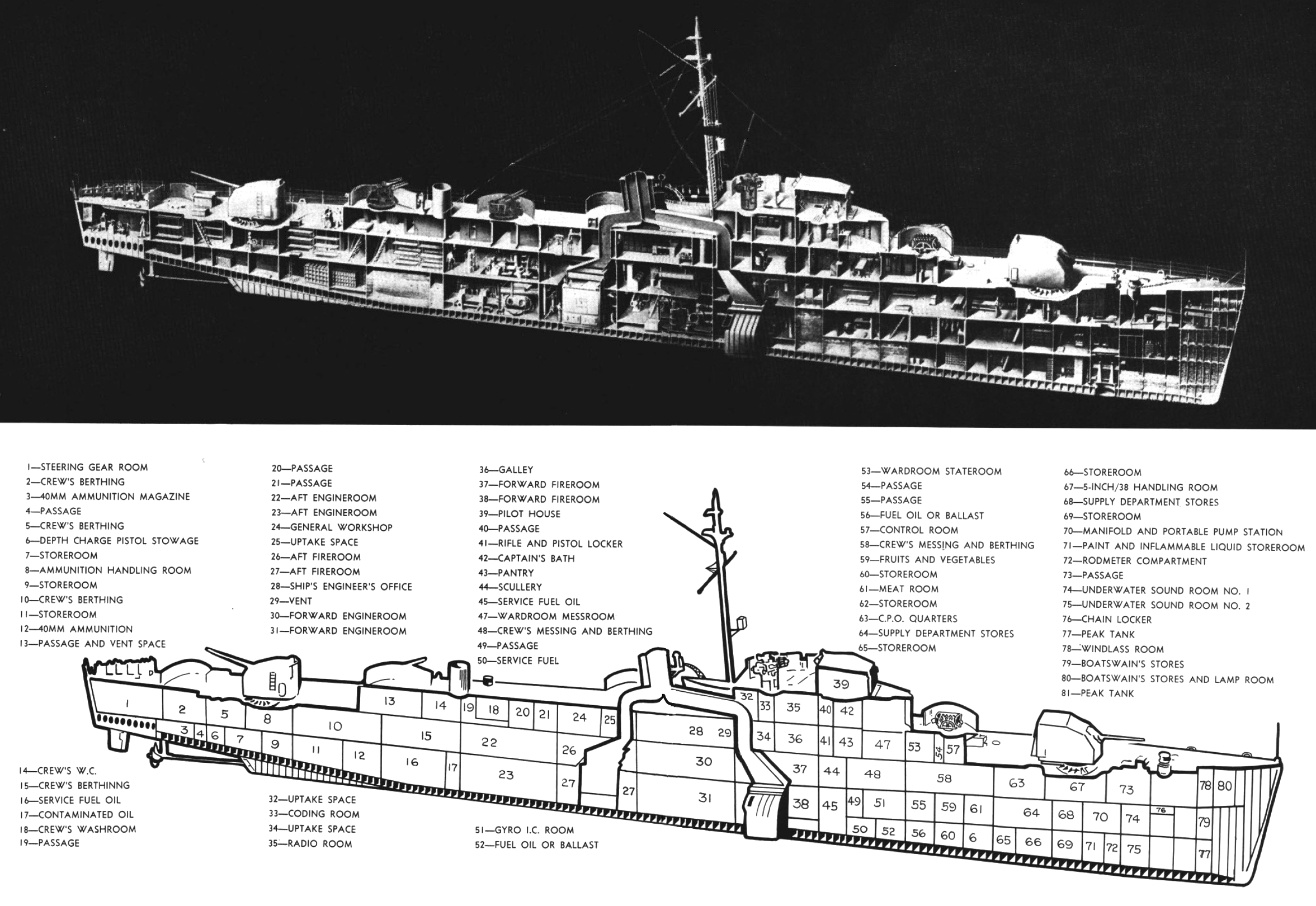

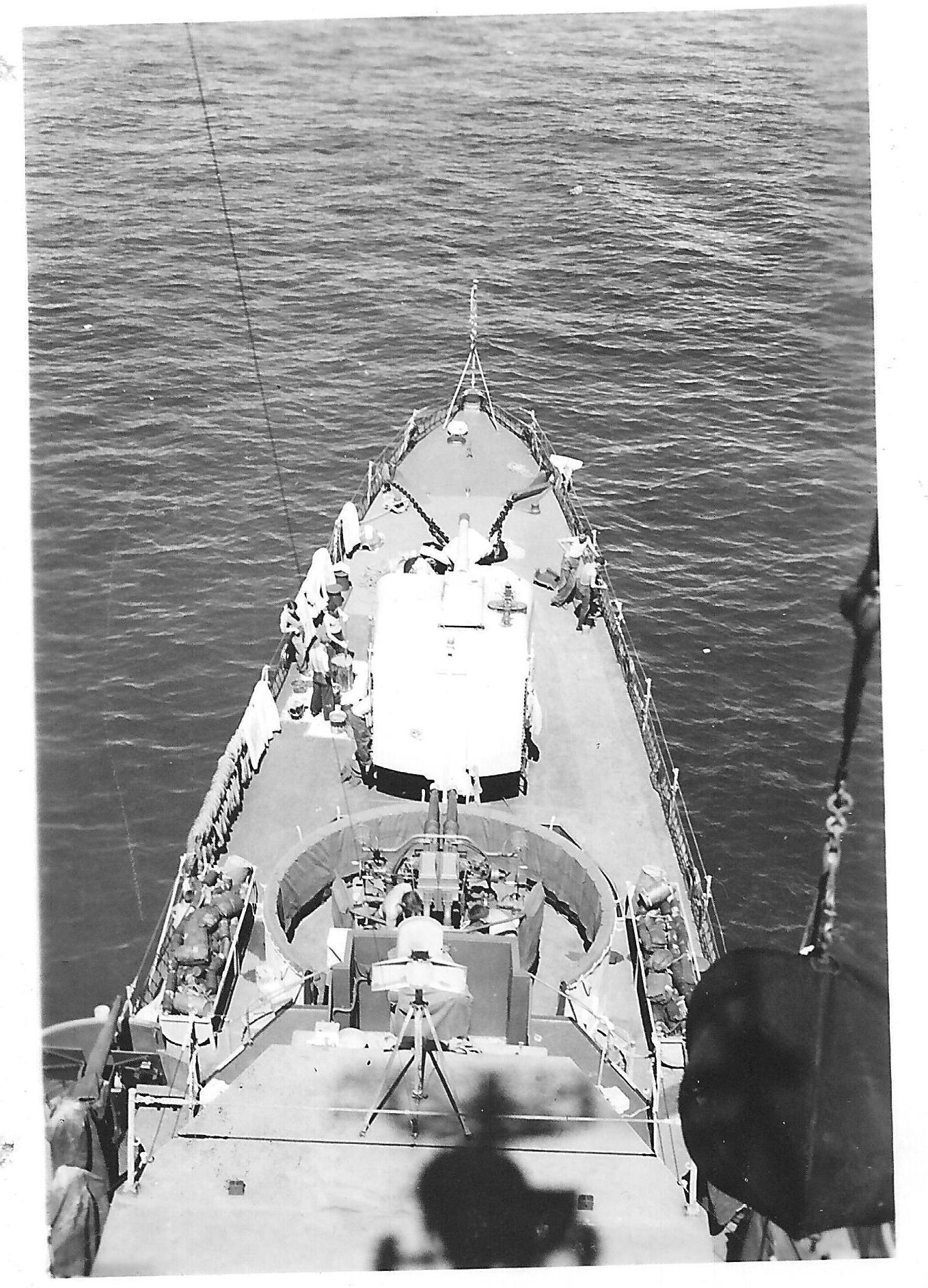
View forward from the mast of Rudderow-class USS Chaffee (DE-230) showing 5in and 40mm guns.

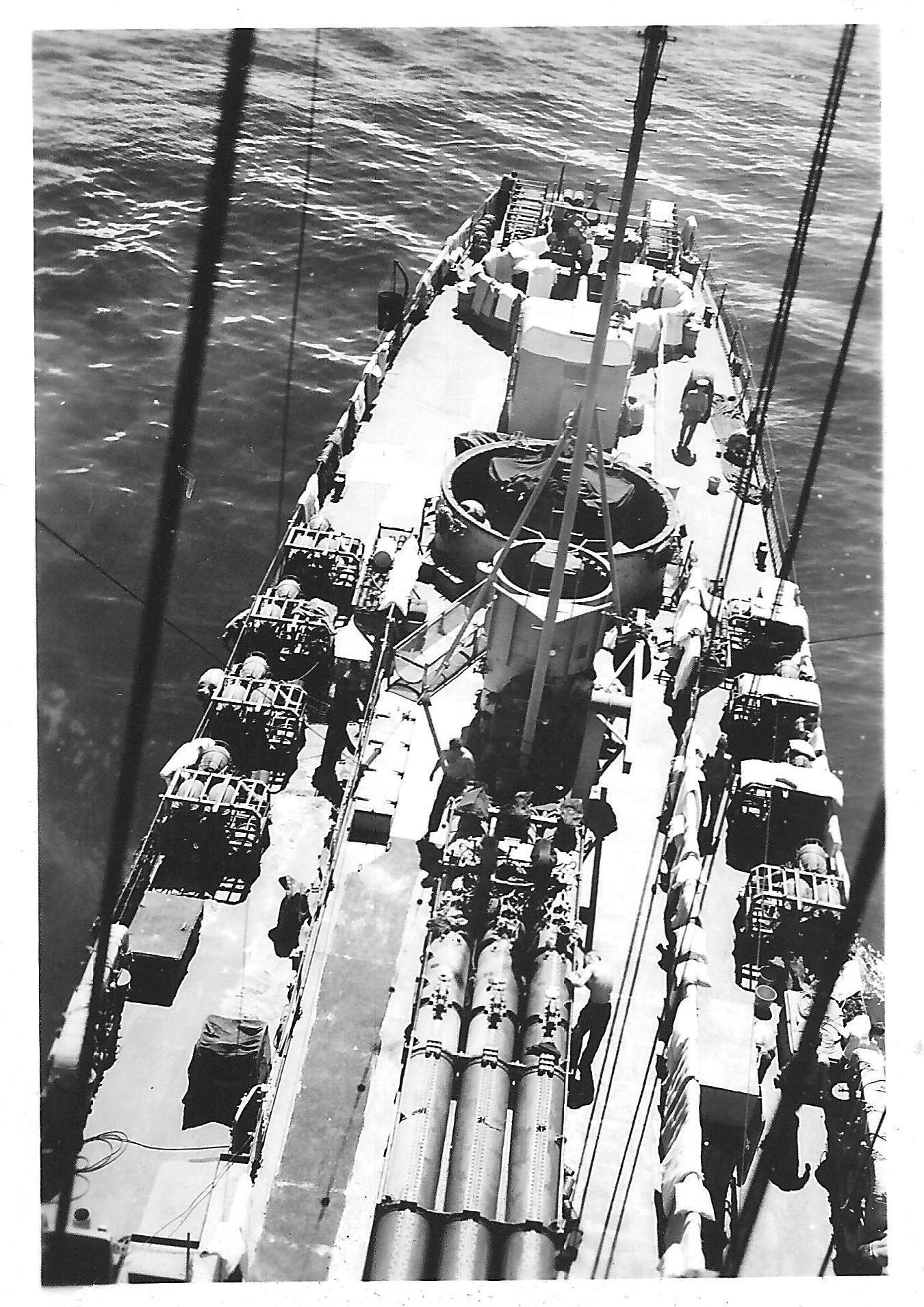
View aft from the mast of Rudderow-class USS Chaffee (DE-230) showing rear 5in and 40mm guns, depth charge racks, depth charge projectors and torpedo tubes.

== Ships in class ==
Construction data
Ship name	Hull no.	Builder	Laid down	Launched	Comm.	Decomm.	Fate
Rudderow	DE-224	Philadelphia Navy Yard	15 Jul 1943	14 Oct 1943	14 May 1944	15 Jan 1947	Struck 1 Nov 1969; sold for scrap, Oct 1970
Day	DE-225	Philadelphia Navy Yard	15 Jul 1943	14 Oct 1943	10 Jun 1944	16 May 1946	Struck 30 Jun 1968; sunk as target, 1 Mar 1969
Ruchamkin	DE-228	Philadelphia Navy Yard	14 Feb 1944	15 Jun 1944	16 Sep 1945	24 Nov 1969	Struck 31 Oct 1977; Colombian Córdoba, museum ship 1980
Chaffee	DE-230	Charleston Navy Yard	26 Aug 1943	27 Nov 1943	9 May 1944	15 Apr 1946	Struck 17 Aug 1946; sold for scrap, 1948
Hodges	DE-231	Charleston Navy Yard	9 Sep 1943	9 Dec 1943	27 May 1944	22 Jun 1946	Struck 1 Dec 1972; sold for scrap, 12 Sep 1973
Riley	DE-579	Bethlehem-Hingham Shipyard	20 Oct 1943	29 Dec 1943	13 Mar 1944	15 Jan 1947	Struck 25 Jan 1974; Taiwanese Tai Yuan, 1968; scrapped 1992
Leslie L.B. Knox	DE-580	Bethlehem-Hingham Shipyard	7 Nov 1943	8 Jan 1944	22 Mar 1944	15 Jun 1946	Struck 15 Jan 1972; sold for scrap, 13 Jun 1973
McNulty	DE-581	Bethlehem-Hingham Shipyard	17 Nov 1943	8 Jan 1944	31 Mar 1944	2 Jul 1946	Struck 1 Mar 1972; sunk as target, 16 Nov 1972
Metivier	DE-582	Bethlehem-Hingham Shipyard	24 Nov 1943	12 Jan 1944	7 Apr 1944	1 Jun 1946	Struck 30 Jun 1968; Sold for scrap, Jun 1969
George A. Johnson	DE-583	Bethlehem-Hingham Shipyard	24 Nov 1943	12 Jan 1944	15 Apr 1944	Sep 1957	Struck 1 Nov 1965; sold for scrap, 19 Sep 1966
Charles J. Kimmel	DE-584	Bethlehem-Hingham Shipyard	1 Dec 1943	15 Jan 1944	20 Apr 1944	15 Jan 1947	Struck 30 Jun 1968; sunk as target, 1 Nov 1969
Daniel A. Joy	DE-585	Bethlehem-Hingham Shipyard	1 Dec 1943	15 Jan 1944	28 Apr 1944	1 May 1965	Struck 1 May 1965; sold for scrap, 1 Mar 1966
Lough	DE-586	Bethlehem-Hingham Shipyard	8 Dec 1943	22 Jan 1944	2 May 1944	24 Jun 1946	Struck 1 Nov 1969; sold for scrap, Oct 1970
Thomas F. Nickel	DE-587	Bethlehem-Hingham Shipyard	15 Dec 1943	22 Jan 1944	9 Jun 1944	26 Feb 1958	Struck 1 Dec 1972; sold for scrap, 9 Jun 1973
Peiffer	DE-588	Bethlehem-Hingham Shipyard	21 Dec 1943	26 Jan 1944	15 Jun 1944	1 Jun 1946	Struck 1 Dec 1966; sunk as target, 16 May 1967
Tinsman	DE-589	Bethlehem-Hingham Shipyard	21 Dec 1943	26 Jan 1944	26 Jun 1944	11 May 1946	Struck 1 Nov 1969; sold for scrap, 14 Sep 1973
DeLong	DE-684	Bethlehem Steel Corporation, Fore River Shipyard	19 Oct 1943	23 Nov 1943	31 Dec 1943	8 Aug 1969	Struck 8 Aug 1969; sunk as target, 19 Feb 1970
Coates	DE-685	Bethlehem Steel Corporation, Fore River Shipyard	8 Nov 1943	9 Dec 1943	24 Jan 1944	30 Jan 1970	Struck 30 Jan 1970; sunk as target, 19 Sep 1971
Eugene E. Elmore	DE-686	Bethlehem Steel Corporation, Fore River Shipyard	27 Nov 1943	23 Dec 1943	4 Feb 1944	31 May 1946	Struck 30 Jun 1968, sold for scrap Jun 1969
Holt	DE-706	Defoe Shipbuilding Company, Bay City, Michigan	28 Nov 1943	15 Feb 1944	9 Jun 1944	2 Jul 1946	Struck 15 Nov 1974; Korean Chung Nam, Jun 1963; scrapped 1984
Jobb	DE-707	Defoe Shipbuilding Company, Bay City, Michigan	20 Dec 1943	4 Mar 1944	4 Jul 1944	13 May 1946	Struck 1 Nov 1969, sold for scrap Oct 1970
Parle	DE-708	Defoe Shipbuilding Company, Bay City, Michigan	8 Jan 1944	25 Mar 1944	29 Jul 1944	1 Jul 1970	Struck 1 Jul 1970; sunk as target of Florida, 27 Oct 1970
Bray	DE-709; APD-139	Defoe Shipbuilding Company, Bay City, Michigan	Jan 1944	15 Apr 1944	4 Sep 1944	10 May 1946	reclassified APD-139 and converted, 16 July 1945

== See also ==
- List of destroyer escorts of the United States Navy
- List of frigates of the United States Navy subset of above with hull numbers DE/FF 1037 and higher plus all DEG/FFGs because of the United States Navy 1975 ship reclassification
- List of frigates
