= USS Day =

Rudderow-class destroyer escort

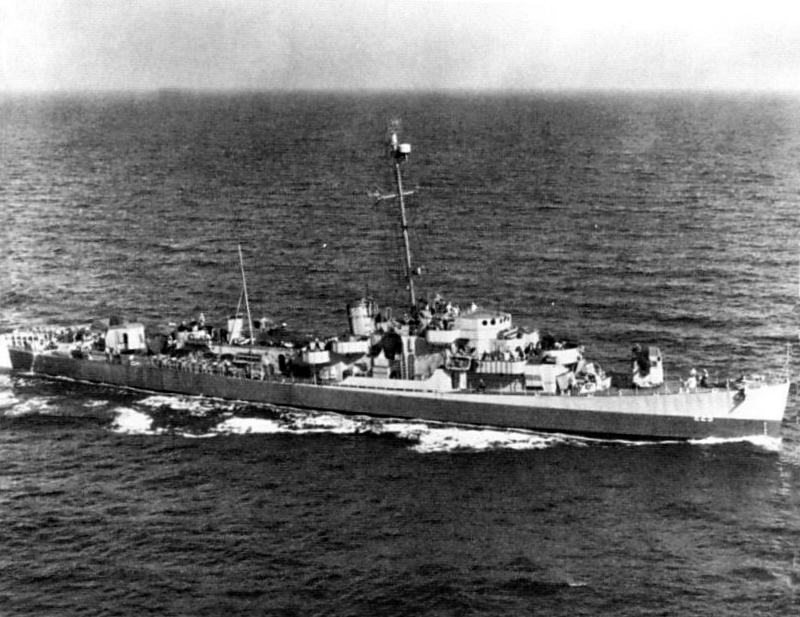

History

United States
- Name: USS Day
- Namesake: Chief Petty Officer Francis Daniel Day
- Builder: Philadelphia Navy Yard
- Laid down: 15 July 1943
- Launched: 14 October 1943
- Sponsored by: Miss G. Day (sister of Francis Day)
- Commissioned: 10 June 1944
- Decommissioned: 16 May 1946
- Stricken: 30 June 1968
- Honors and awards: Two battle stars for World War II service
- Fate: Sunk as target 1 March 1969

General characteristics
- Class & type: Rudderow
- Type: Destroyer escort
- Displacement: 1,450 tons
- Length: 306 feet
- Beam: 36 feet, 10 inches
- Draft: 9 feet 8 inches
- Speed: 24 knots
- Complement: 186
- Armament: 2 × 5 in/38 cal (127 mm) (2×1); 4 × 40-mm (2×2); 10 × 20 mm (10×1); 3 × 21-inch (533 mm) torpedo tubes (1×3); 1 Hedgehog depth bomb thrower; 8 depth charge projectors (8×1); 2 depth charge racks

USS Day (DE-225) was a Rudderow-class destroyer escort in the United States Navy during World War II.

== Namesake ==
Francis Daniel Day was born on 25 July 1904 in Milburn, New Jersey. He enlisted in the Navy on 12 January 1925 and served continuously until his death on the USS Oklahoma during the Japanese Attack on Pearl Harbor on 7 December 1941. Chief Water Tender Day was posthumously awarded the Navy and Marine Corps Medal for risking his life to assist 15 of the crew to escape from a flooded compartment through a submerged porthole.

== Construction and commissioning ==
Day was launched 14 October 1943 by the Philadelphia Navy Yard in Philadelphia, Pennsylvania, sponsored by Miss G. Day, sister of the ship's namesake and commissioned on 10 June 1944.

== Service history ==
Departing New York City 14 October 1944 Day sailed to Hollandia, New Guinea. arriving on 21 November 1944. She escorted a convoy to Finschhafen and Morotai between 9 and 20 December 1944, and on 26 December 1944 departed Hollandia to screen convoys passing between Sansapor and Leyte in the Philippine Islands.

Detached from this duty at Leyte on 4 January 1945, she escorted a convoy of 56 tugs and tows to Lingayen Gulf at Luzon in the Philippines, fighting off three attacks by Japanese planes before her arrival at the newly invaded beaches there on 14 January 1945. Returning to Leyte on 18 January 1945, Day sailed a week later for the invasion of the San Antonio-San Felipe area of Luzon which had already been taken by Philippine guerrilla forces.

During February 1945 Day operated locally out of San Pedro Bay in the Philippines on patrol and convoy duty. She was assigned to screen a group of minesweepers clearing Manila Bay, then returned to Subic Bay to escort a convoy of merchant ships into the newly swept harbor at Manila on Luzon. She supported the landings at the port of Legaspi, Luzon, on 1 April 1945, returning with reinforcements on 4 April 1945. The next day, she got underway to serve as command ship for a minesweeping unit clearing the channels around Balabac Island and opening the southern approaches from the Sulu Sea to the South China Sea. She returned to Leyte on 3 May 1945 and on 7 May 1945 joined a task unit bound for Morotai. She participated in the invasion of Borneo from 7 to 12 June 1945, returning with reinforcements 21 to 30 June 1945.

From 22 July to 22 August 1945, Day escorted convoys between Ulithi and Leyte.

Day remained in the Philippines after World War II ended on 15 August 1945 until 18 December 1945, when she departed for San Diego, California, arriving there on 9 January 1946. She was placed out of commission in reserve at San Diego on 16 May 1946 and never returned to active service.

== Disposal ==
Day was stricken from the Naval Vessel Register on 30 June 1968 and sunk as a target in the Pacific Ocean off San Clemente Island, California, on 1 March 1969.

== Awards ==
Day received two battle stars for her World War II service.
