= USS DeLong (DE-684) =

Rudderow-class destroyer escort

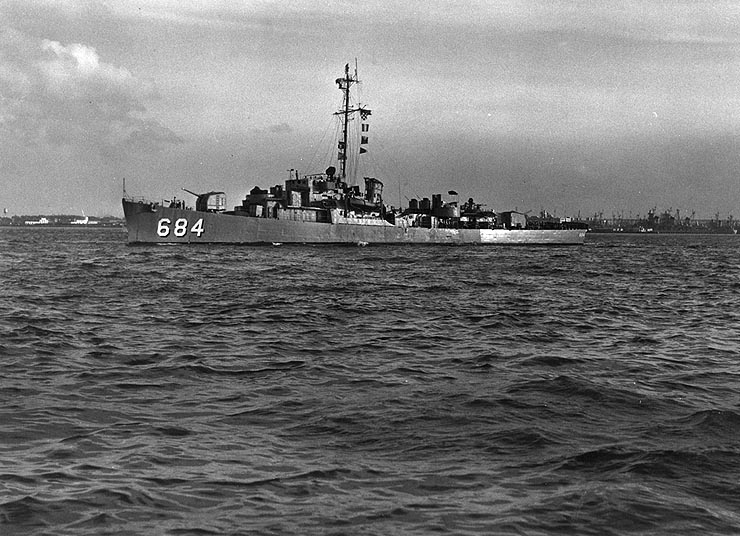
- USS DeLong underway

History

United States
- Name: USS DeLong (DE-684)
- Namesake: Weldon Fader DeLong
- Awarded: 29 October 1942
- Builder: Bethlehem Steel Company
- Laid down: 19 October 1943
- Launched: 23 November 1943
- Acquired: 31 December 1943
- Commissioned: 31 December 1943
- Decommissioned: 1 August 1962 (Final)
- Out of service: 8 August 1969
- Stricken: 8 August 1969
- Fate: Sunk as target 19 February 1970

General characteristics
- Class & type: Rudderow-class destroyer escort
- Displacement: 1,450 tons
- Length: 306 ft (93 m)
- Beam: 37 ft (11 m)
- Draft: 9 ft 8 in (2.95 m)
- Propulsion: 2 CE boilers, G.E. turbines with electric drive, 12000 shp, 2 screws
- Speed: 24 knots
- Range: 5,050 nm, at 12 knots
- Complement: 186
- Armament: 2 x 5 in (130 mm)/38 guns, 3 x 21-inch (533 mm) torpedo tubes, 8 x K-gun depth charge projectors, 1 x depth charge projector (Hedgehog type), 2 x depth charge tracks
- Aircraft carried: none

USS DeLong (DE-684) was a Rudderow-class destroyer escort during World War II and the Cold War.

== Namesake ==
Weldon Fader DeLong was born on 18 September 1916 in Baras Corner, Nova Scotia, Canada. He enlisted in the United States Marine Corps on 20 September 1940. He was killed in action at Point Cruz, Guadalcanal on 3 November 1942. Corporal DeLong was posthumously awarded the Navy Cross.

== Construction and service ==
She was built at Quincy, Massachusetts, launched on 23 November 1943 and commissioned on 31 December 1943.

During World War II DeLong served primarily as a training ship for officers and men that were about to embark on ships assigned to anti-submarine warfare (ASW) duties. In early 1946 DeLong was decommissioned and assigned to the Reserve Fleet at Green Cove Springs, Florida. Following the outbreak of the Korean War, DeLong was reactivated and on 7 February 1951 was again commissioned.

After a short training period DeLong was assigned to Escort Squadron Eight, Destroyer Force, U.S. Atlantic Fleet. During this period of service DeLong participated in several Fleet Exercises and Midshipmen Cruises. In addition to routine fleet support missions, DeLong often served as a training ship for the Fleet Sonar School, Key West, Florida. On 3 January 1958, DeLong was assigned Group II status, joining the newly formed Reserve ASW Program in the 3d Naval District.

During the Berlin Crisis of 1960–1961, DeLong was assigned to the U.S. Atlantic Fleet as part of Escort Squadron 18 and homeported in Newport, Rhode Island. During this period DeLong operated extensively in the Caribbean area. On 1 August 1961, DeLong resumed her Group II status, operating under Commander, Naval Reserve Destroyer Division, 3d Naval District. Stationed at Fort Schuyler Naval Reserve base located in the Bronx, New York, 10465.

DeLong was decommissioned and struck from naval records in the late 1960s and was sunk as a target on 19 February 1970.

== Military awards and honors ==
Navy Expeditionary Medal
American Campaign Medal
World War II Victory Medal
National Defense Service Medal (with one bronze service star)

== Scale Model ==
A 1/300 scale plastic model kit of the USS Delong was made by the Lindberg model company.

== See also ==
- List of destroyer escorts of the United States Navy

== Sources ==
- Photo gallery of USS DeLong (DE-684) at NavSource Naval History
