= USS Lough =

Rudderow-class destroyer escort of the United States Navy

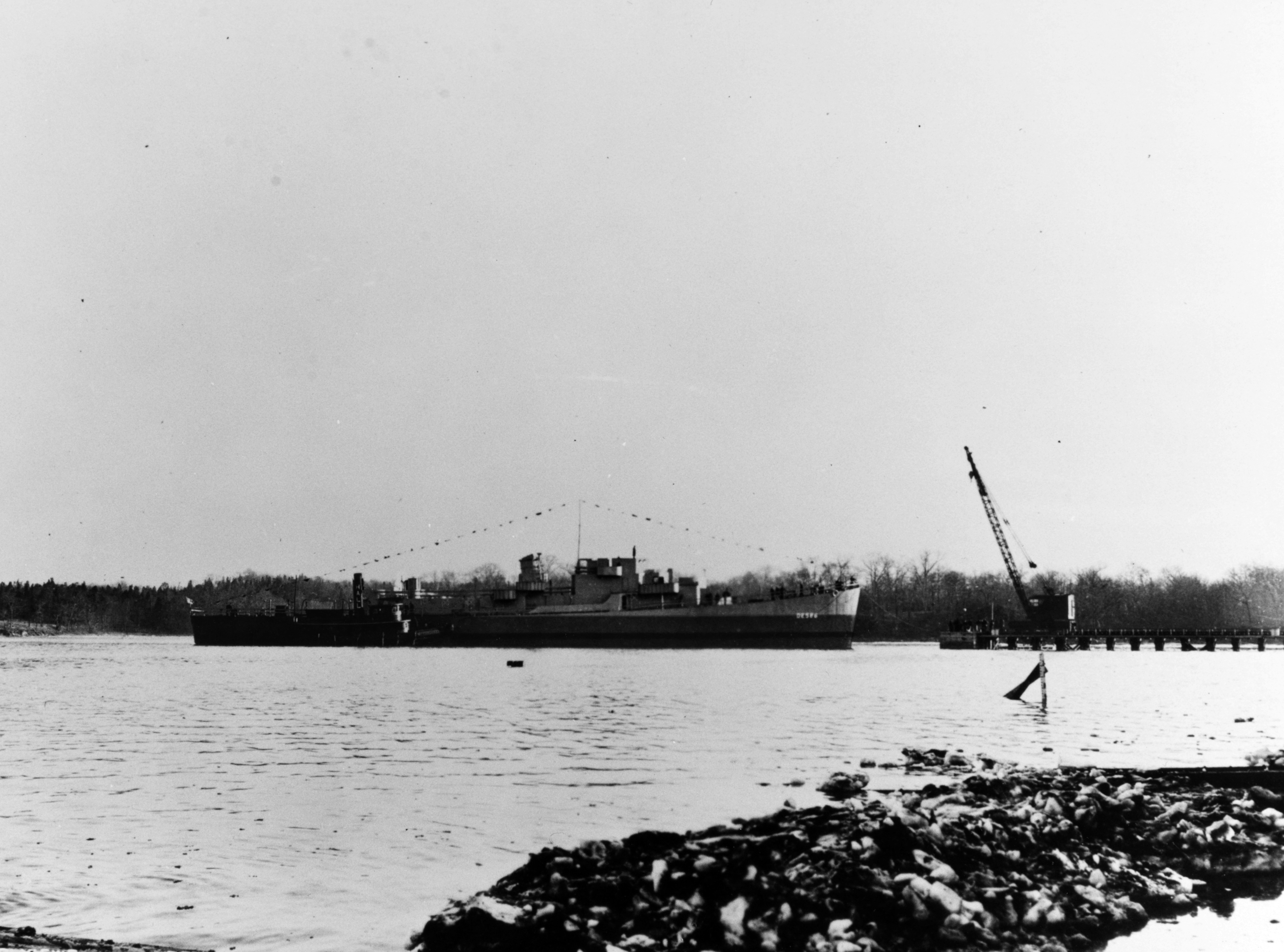
- USS Lough just after her launching

History

United States
- Name: USS Lough
- Namesake: John Cady Lough
- Builder: Bethlehem-Hingham Shipyard
- Laid down: 8 December 1943
- Launched: 22 January 1944
- Commissioned: 2 May 1944
- Decommissioned: 24 June 1946
- Honors and awards: Three battlestars
- Fate: Sold for scrapping, October 1970

General characteristics
- Class & type: Rudderow
- Type: Destroyer escort
- Displacement: 1,450 tons
- Length: 306 feet
- Beam: 36 feet, 10 inches
- Draft: 9 feet 8 inches
- Speed: 24 knots
- Complement: 186
- Armament: 2 × 5 in/38 cal (127 mm) (2x1); 4 × 40-mm (2x2); 10 × 20 mm (10x1); 3 × 21 inch (533 mm) torpedo tubes (1x3); 1 Hedgehog depth bomb thrower; 8 depth charge projectors (8x1); 2 depth charge racks

USS Lough (DE-586) was a Rudderow-class destroyer escort in service with the United States Navy from 1944 to 1946. She was sold for scrapping in 1970.

== Namesake ==
John Cady Lough was born on 22 November 1915 in Geneseo, Illinois. He attended Illinois Wesleyan University and enlisted in the United States Naval Reserve on 2 December 1940. Appointed aviation cadet on 6 March 1941, he trained at Naval Air Station Miami and was commissioned Ensign on 1 November 1941. As a member of Scouting Squadron 6 on the USS Enterprise, he was lost in the Battle of Midway on 4 June 1942. He was posthumously awarded the Navy Cross for courageous devotion to duty in the face of formidable antiaircraft fire and fierce fighter opposition.

== Construction and commissioning ==
Lough was laid down 8 December 1943 by Bethlehem-Hingham Shipyard, Inc., Hingham, Massachusetts; launched 22 January 1944; sponsored by Miss Rose Anne Lough, sister of Ensign Lough; and commissioned at Boston 2 May 1944.

== History ==
Lough shookdown off Bermuda and in June 1944 began coastal escort from Norfolk, Virginia to New York City, then guarded a convoy to Bizerte and another back to the United States. She arrived Espiritu Santo from Panama 1 November and joined the service force of the 3rd Fleet as escort from the Solomons and New Guinea to Manus, where she witnessed the disastrous explosion of ammunition ship USS Mount Hood (AE-11) 20 November and participated in the fruitless search for survivors.

Rendezvousing 10 November at Hollandia, New Guinea, she escorted 7th Fleet Commander, Admiral Thomas C. Kinkaid for the amphibious landing at San Pedro Bay, Leyte. Arriving 25 November she fought off her first air attack almost at once. She served on escort and patrol in the Philippines until the fighting ended, twice voyaging to Hollandia for resupply echelons.

While protecting the landing of the 11th Airborne Division on Nasugbu 31 January 1945, Lough engaged about 20 suicide boats armed with depth charges that attacked the screen, sinking an undetermined number of the enemy. She then pulled from the water 63 survivors of less fortunate USS PC-1129. Two nights later Lough and USS Presley (DE-371), fearing a similar attack, sank two friendly PT boats, which approached without identifying themselves.

After hostilities ceased she left Manila 24 August on the first of a series of escort missions to Okinawa which continued until 28 November, when she left for Eniwetok, Pearl Harbor, and San Pedro, Los Angeles, arriving 18 December.

Lough decommissioned at San Diego 24 June 1946 and entered the Pacific Reserve Fleet at Stockton, California. She was sold for scrapping in October 1970.

Lough received three battle stars for World War II service.
