= Norman Irish =

Medieval ethnic group in Ireland

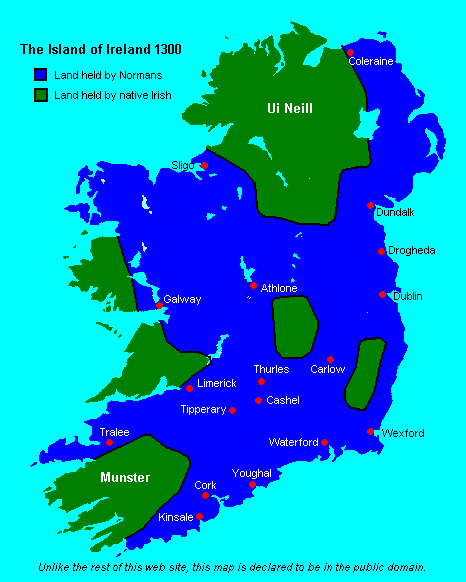
Ireland in 1300 showing maximum extent of Hiberno-Norman control

Norman Irish or Hiberno-Normans (Irish: Normánach; Old Irish: Gall 'foreigners') is a modern term for the descendants of Norman settlers who arrived during the Anglo-Norman invasion of Ireland in the 12th century. Most came from England and Wales. They are distinguished from the native Gaelic Irish, although some Normans eventually became Gaelicised. The Hiberno-Normans were a feudal aristocracy and merchant oligarchy which controlled the Lordship of Ireland. The Hiberno-Normans were associated with the Gregorian Reform of the Catholic Church in Ireland and contributed to the emergence of a Hiberno-English dialect.

Some of the most prominent Hiberno-Norman families were the Burkes (de Burghs), Butlers, and FitzGeralds. One of the most common Irish surnames, Walsh, derives from Welsh Normans who arrived in Ireland as part of this group. Some Norman families were said to have become "more Irish than the Irish themselves" by merging culturally and intermarrying with the Gaels.

The dominance of the Catholic Hiberno-Normans waned during the 16th century English Reformation, when the Protestant "New English" elite settled in Ireland. The Hiberno-Normans came to be known as the Old English (Seanghaill) at this time. Many Norman-Irish families spread throughout the world as part of the Irish diaspora. Following the Glorious Revolution, many Old English families promoted unity with the Gaels under the denominator of "Irish Catholic", while others were assimilated into a new Irish Protestant identity, which also included later settler groups such as the Ulster Scots and Huguenots.

== Nomenclature ==
By the late 12th century, the distinction between the Saxon and Norman populations of England was beginning to dissolve. Contemporary sources (including those written in Anglo-Norman) refer to the invaders who crossed the Irish Sea at this time simply as "the English". It has therefore been questioned whether the term Norman is appropriate in an Irish context. According to Robin Frame, "for historians studying language and elite culture, 'Anglo‐Norman' or 'Anglo‐French' is a defensible alternative; for those concerned with politics, government, and national consciousness, 'English' is probably the least inaccurate way of describing those involved in the invasions of 1167–71 and the colonization that followed". Nevertheless, a range of terms continue in use, including Norman, Anglo‐Norman, Cambro‐Norman, and (for the descendants of the initial incomers) Hiberno-Norman.

In the 16th century, when the Tudor conquest brought a new wave of incomers to Ireland, the descendants of those who had arrived in the Middle Ages came to be known as the Old English, in contrast to the New English.

== History ==
=== Normans in medieval Ireland ===
Coat of arms of the Lordship of Ireland

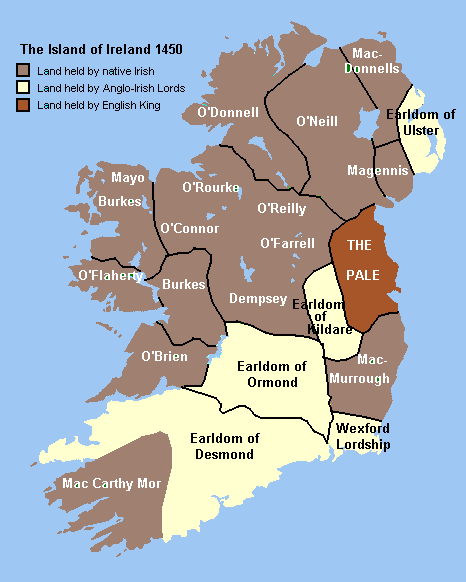
Ireland in 1450 showing territories recognising Anglo-Norman sovereignty in blue and grey

Traditionally, London-based Anglo-Norman governments expected the Normans in the Lordship of Ireland to promote the interests of the Kingdom of England, through the use of the English language (despite the fact that they spoke Norman French rather than English), law, trade, currency, social customs, and farming methods. The Norman community in Ireland was, however, never monolithic. In some areas, especially in the Pale around Dublin, and in relatively urbanised communities in Kilkenny, Limerick, Cork and south Wexford, people spoke the English language (though sometimes in divergent local dialects such as Yola and Fingallian), used English law, and in some respects lived in a manner similar to that found in England.

However, in the provinces, the Normans in Ireland (Irish: Gaill meaning "foreigners") were at times indistinguishable from the surrounding Gaelic lords and chieftains. Dynasties such as the Fitzgeralds, Butlers, Burkes, and Wall clans adopted the native language, legal system, and other customs such as fostering and intermarriage with the Gaelic Irish and the patronage of Irish poetry and music. Such people became regarded as "more Irish than the Irish themselves" as a result of this process (see also History of Ireland (1169–1536)). The most accurate name for the Gaelicised Anglo-Irish throughout the late medieval period was Hiberno-Norman, a name which captures the distinctive blended culture which this community created and within which it operated until the Tudor conquest. In an effort to halt the ongoing Gaelicisation of the Anglo-Irish community, the Irish Parliament passed the Statutes of Kilkenny in 1367, which among other things banned the use of the Irish language, the wearing of Irish clothes, as well as prohibiting the Gaelic Irish from living within walled towns.

==== The Pale ====
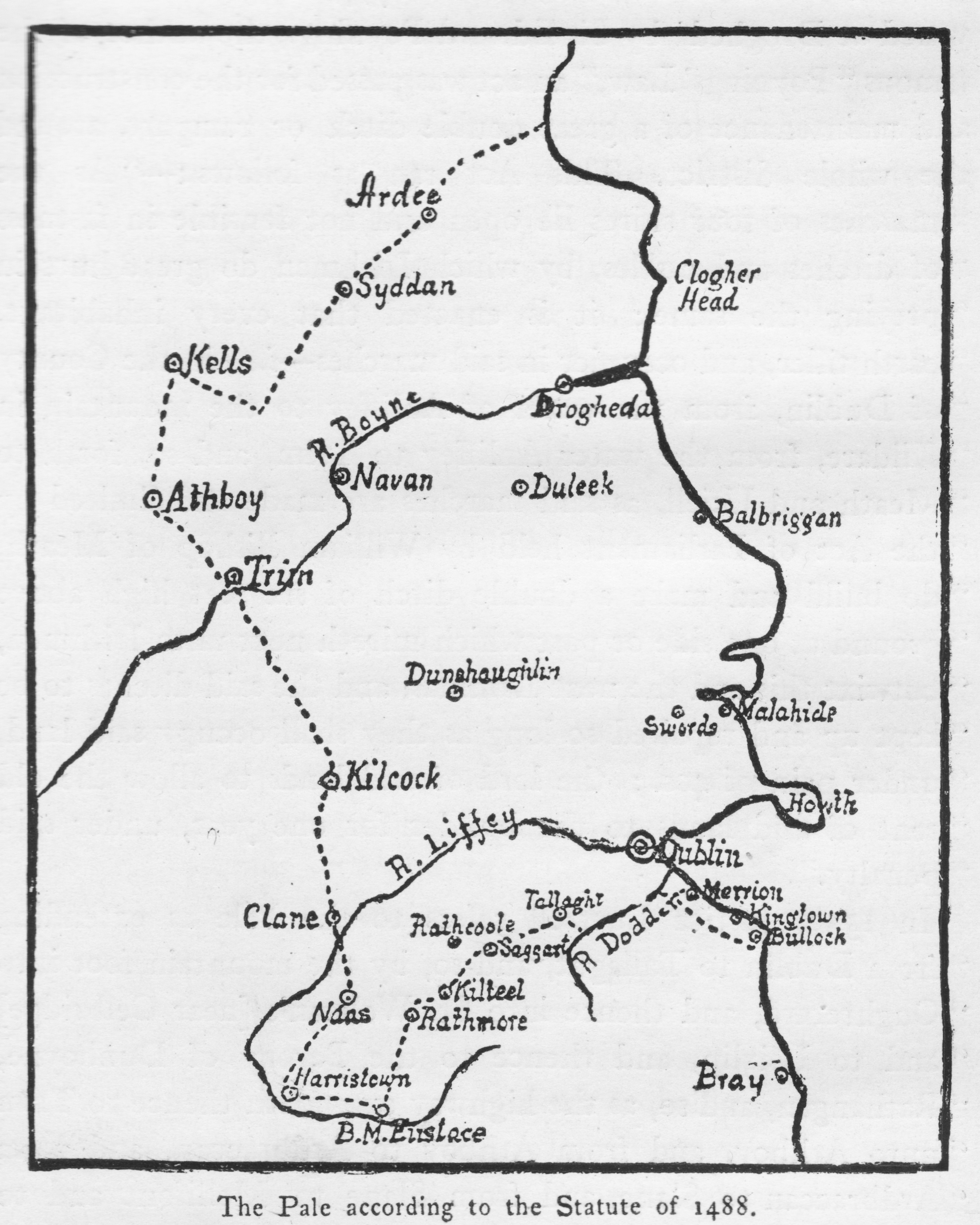
The Pale in 1488

Despite these efforts, by 1515, one official lamented, that "all the common people of the said half counties [of The Pale] that obeyeth the King's laws, for the most part be of Irish birth, of Irish habit, and of Irish language." English administrators such as Fynes Moryson, writing in the last years of the sixteenth century, shared the latter view of the Anglo-Irish: "the English Irish and the very citizens (excepting those of Dublin where the lord deputy resides) though they could speak English as well as we, yet commonly speak Irish among themselves, and were hardly induced by our familiar conversation to speak English with us". Moryson's views on the cultural fluidity of the so-called English Pale were echoed by other commentators such as Richard Stanihurst who, while protesting the Englishness of the Palesmen in 1577, opined that "Irish was universally gaggled in the English Pale".

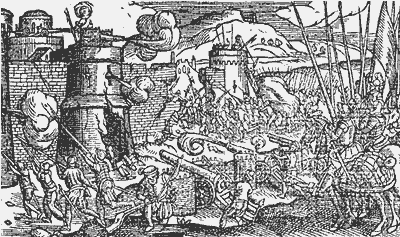
The Earl of Kildare's siege of Dublin in 1535

Beyond the Pale, the term 'English', if and when it was applied, referred to a thin layer of landowners and nobility, who ruled over Gaelic Irish freeholders and tenants. The division between the Pale and the rest of Ireland was therefore in reality not rigid or impermeable, but rather one of gradual cultural and economic differences across wide areas. Consequently, the English identity expressed by representatives of the Pale when writing in English to the English Crown often contrasted radically with their cultural affinities and kinship ties to the Gaelic world around them, and this difference between their cultural reality and their expressed identity is a central reason for the Old English's later support of Catholicism. There was no religious division in medieval Ireland, beyond the requirement that English-born prelates should run the Irish church. However, most of the pre-16th century inhabitants of Ireland continued their allegiance to Catholicism, following the Henrician Reformation of the 1530s, even after the establishment of the Anglican Church of Ireland.

=== Tudor conquest and arrival of New English ===
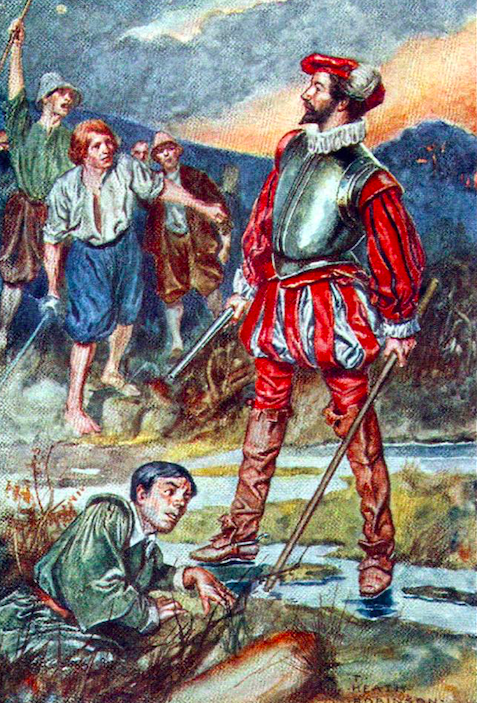
In 1569 Sir Edmund Butler led a revolt after his lands were granted to a "New English" settler, Sir Peter Carew

In contrast to previous English settlers, the New English, that wave of settlers who came to Ireland from England during the Elizabethan era onwards as a result of the Tudor conquest of Ireland, were more self-consciously English, and were largely (though not entirely) Protestant. To the New English, many of the Old Anglo-Irish were "degenerate", having "gone native" and adopted Irish customs as well as choosing to adhere to Roman Catholicism after the Crown's official split with Rome. The poet Edmund Spenser was one of the chief advocates of this view. He argued in A View of the Present State of Irelande (1595) that a failure to conquer Ireland fully in the past had led the Old generations of English settlers to become corrupted by the native Irish culture. In the course of the 16th century, the religious division had the effect of alienating most of the Old Anglo-Irish from the state, and bolstered by Jacobite reverts like the Dillons propelled them into making common cause with the Gaelic Irish under the Irish Catholic identity.

The first confrontation between the Old English and the English government in Ireland came with the cess crisis of 1556–1583. During that period, the Pale community resisted paying for the English army sent to Ireland to put down a string of revolts which culminated in the Desmond Rebellions (1569–1573 and 1579–1583). The term "Old English" was coined at this time, as the Pale community emphasised their English identity and loyalty to the Stuart Crown and refusing to co-operate with the wishes of the Elizabeth's Parliament as represented in Ireland by the Lord Deputy of Ireland.

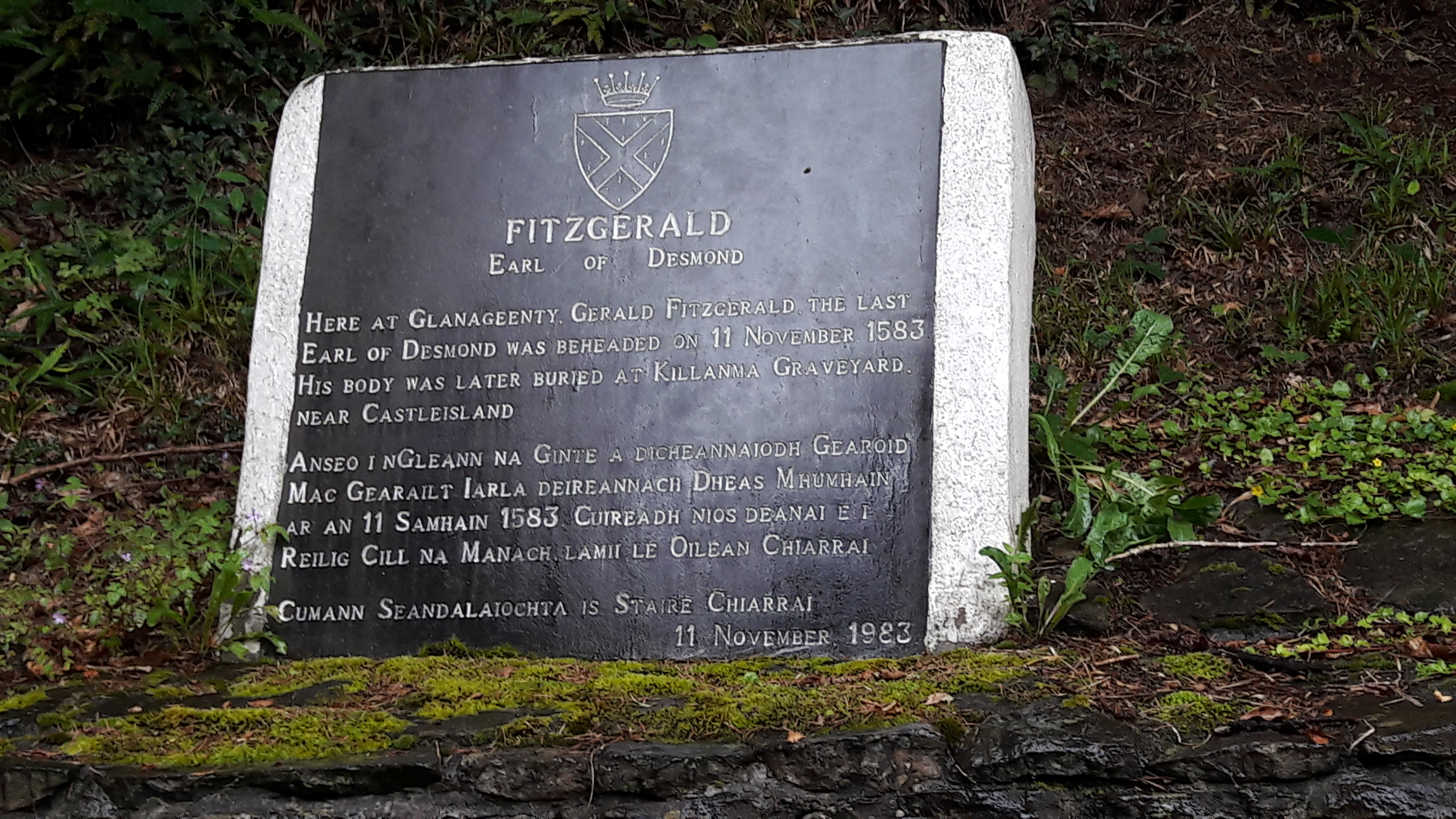
Monument marking the site of the capture and execution of the Earl of Desmond James FitzMaurice FitzGerald in Glanageenty forest, County Kerry.

Originally, the conflict was a civil issue, as the Palesmen objected to paying new taxes that had not first been approved by them in the Parliament of Ireland. The dispute, however, also soon took on a religious dimension, especially after 1570, when Elizabeth I of England was excommunicated by Pope Pius V's papal bull Regnans in Excelsis. In response, Elizabeth banned the Jesuits from her realms as they were seen as being among the Papacy's most radical agents of the Counter-Reformation which, among other aims, sought to topple her from her thrones. Rebels such as James Fitzmaurice Fitzgerald portrayed their rebellion as a "Holy War", and indeed received money and troops from the papal coffers. In the Second Desmond Rebellion (1579–1583), a prominent Pale lord, James Eustace, Viscount of Baltinglass, joined the rebels from religious motivation. Before the rebellion was over, several hundred Old English Palesmen had been arrested and sentenced to death, either for outright rebellion, or because they were suspected rebels because of their religious views. Most were eventually pardoned after paying fines of up to 100 pounds, a very large sum for the time. However, twenty landed gentlemen from some of the Pale's leading Old English families were executed; some of them "died in the manner of [Roman] Catholic martyrs, proclaiming they were suffering for their religious beliefs".

This episode marked an important break between the Pale and the English regime in Ireland, and between the Old English and the New English.

=== Emerging Loyalism ===
In the subsequent Nine Years' War (1594–1603), the Pale and the Old English towns remained loyal; they were in favour of outward loyalty to the English Crown during another rebellion.

However, it was the English Government's administration in Ireland along loyalist lines particularly following the failure of the Gunpowder Plot in 1605 that would lead to severing the main political ties between the Old English and England itself.

First, in 1609, Roman Catholics were banned from holding public office in Ireland forcing many Old English like the Dillons to outwardly adopt Anglican Catholicism. Then, in 1613, the constituencies of the Irish Parliament were changed so that the New English would have a slight majority in the Irish House of Commons. Thirdly, in the 1630s, many members of the Old English landowning class were forced to confirm the ancient title to their land-holdings often in the absence of title deeds, which resulted in some having to pay substantial fines to retain their property, while others ended up losing some or all of their land in this complex legal process (see Plantations of Ireland).

The political response of the Old Anglo-Irish community was forced to go over the heads of the New English in Dublin and appeal directly to their sovereign in his role as King of Ireland which further disgruntled them.

=== The Graces ===
The Old English sought a package of reforms, first from James I and then from his son Charles I, known as The Graces, which included provisions for religious toleration and civil equality for Roman Catholics in return for their payment of increased taxes. On several occasions in the 1620s and 1630s, however, after they had agreed to pay the higher taxes to the Crown, they found that the Monarch or his Irish viceroy Thomas Wentworth chose instead to defer some of the agreed concessions. This was to prove counterproductive for the cause of the English administration in Ireland, as it led to Old English writers such as Geoffrey Keating to argue (as he did in Foras Feasa ar Éirinn in 1634) that the true identity of the Old English was now Roman Catholic and Irish, rather than English. English policy thus hastened the assimilation of the Old English with the Gaels.

=== Resisting English Parliament ===
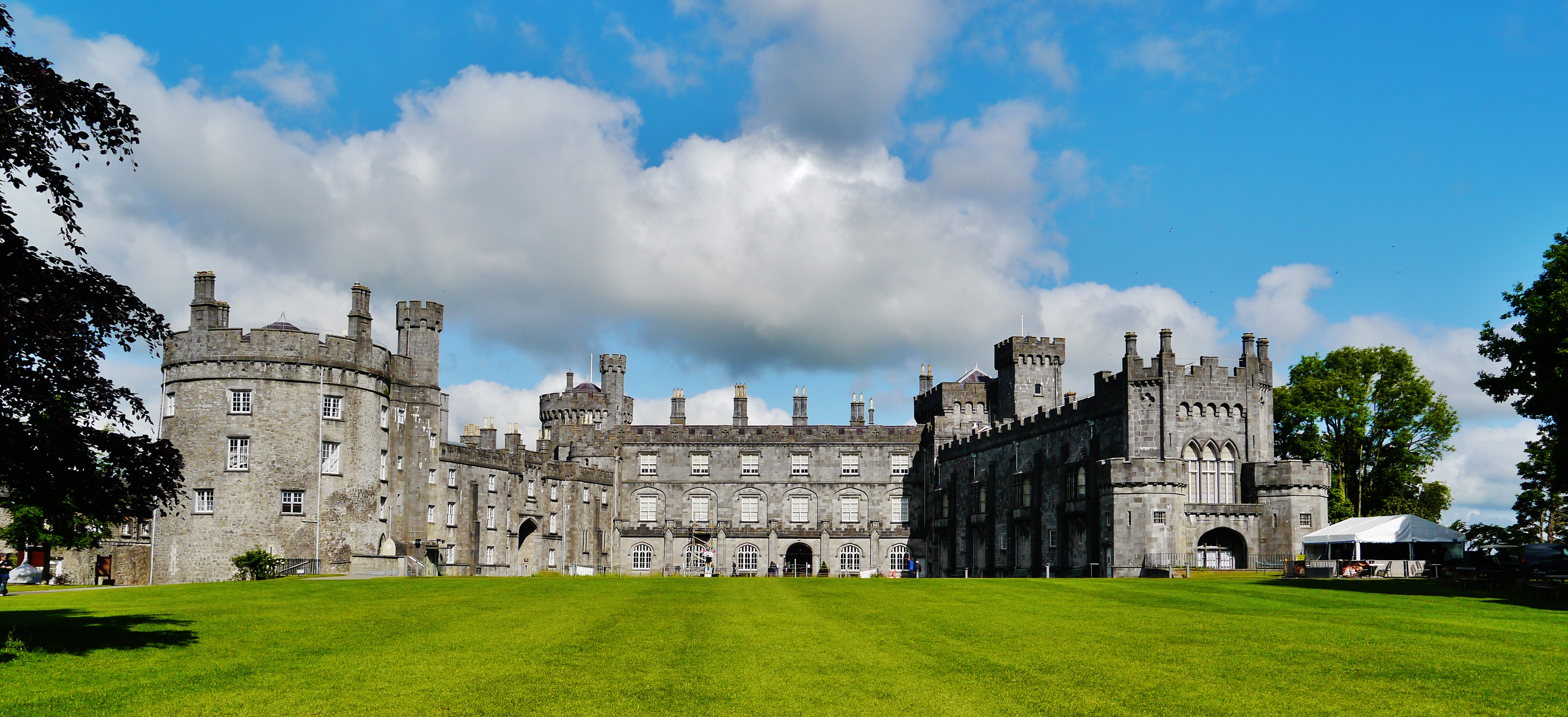
Kilkenny Castle, seat of the General Assembly of the Irish Confederacy (1642-1652), an independent government composed of Gaelic and Old English Catholic aristocrats

In 1641, many of the Old English community made a decisive break with their past as loyal subjects by joining the Irish Rebellion of 1641. Many factors influenced the decision of the Old English to join in the rebellion; among these were fear of the rebels and fear of government reprisals against all Roman Catholics. The main long-term reason was, however, a desire to reverse the anti-Roman Catholic policies that had been pursued by the English authorities over the previous 40 years in carrying out their administration of Ireland. Nevertheless, despite their formation of an Irish government in Confederate Ireland, the Old English identity was still an important division within the Irish Roman Catholic community. During the Irish Confederate Wars (1641–1653), the Old English were often accused by the Gaelic Irish of having been too hasty to sign a treaty with Charles I of England at the expense of the interests of Irish landowners and the Roman Catholic religion. The ensuing Cromwellian conquest of Ireland (1649–1653), saw further defeat of the Roman Catholic cause and the almost wholesale dispossession of the Old English nobility leading to a revival of the cause before the Williamite war in Ireland (1689–1691) evolving into Jacobitism afterwards. Nevertheless, in the 1700s, Parliamentarians had become the dominant class in the country and with the end of the Jacobites in 1788, the Old Anglo-Irish cause evolved into the Irish Rebellion of 1798. Protestant Irish nationalists sometimes found their origins through Old English families (and men of Gaelic origin such as William Conolly) who had chosen to comply with Anglican rule by conforming to the established church.

==== Protestant Ascendancy ====
In the course of the eighteenth century under the Protestant Ascendancy, social divisions were defined almost solely in sectarian terms of Roman Catholics, Anglicans and Nonconformist Protestants, rather than ethnic ones. Against the backdrop of the Penal Laws which discriminated against them both, and a country becoming increasingly Parliamentarian, the old distinction between Old English and Gaelic Irish Roman Catholics gradually faded away.

Changing religion and conforming to the state church was always an option for any of the King of Ireland's subjects, and an open avenue to inclusion in the officially recognised "body politic", and, indeed, many Old English such as Edmund Burke were newly-conforming Anglicans who retained a certain sympathy and understanding for the difficult position of Roman Catholics, as Burke did in his parliamentary career. Others in the gentry such as the Viscounts Dillon and the Lords Dunsany belonged to Old English families who had originally undergone a religious conversion from Rome to Canterbury to save their lands and titles. Some members of the Old English who had thus gained membership in the Protestant Ascendancy even became adherents of the cause of Irish independence. Whereas the Old English FitzGerald Dukes of Leinster held the premier title in the Irish House of Lords when it was abolished in 1800, a scion of that Ascendancy family, the Irish nationalist Lord Edward Fitzgerald, was a brother of the second duke.

== Norman surnames in Ireland ==
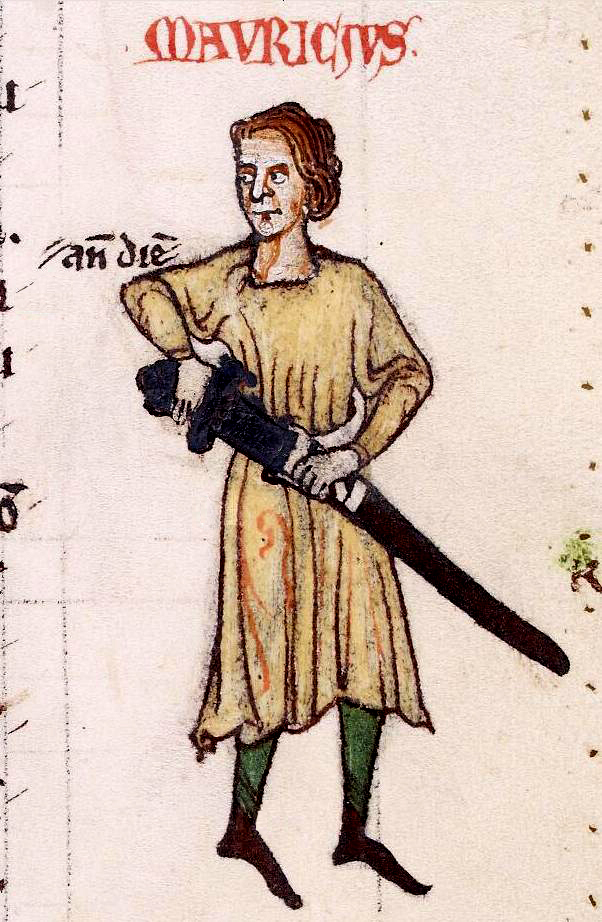
Maurice FitzGerald, Lord of Maynooth, Naas, and Llansteffan, progenitor of the FitzGerald dynasty, from a manuscript of the Expugnatio Hibernica

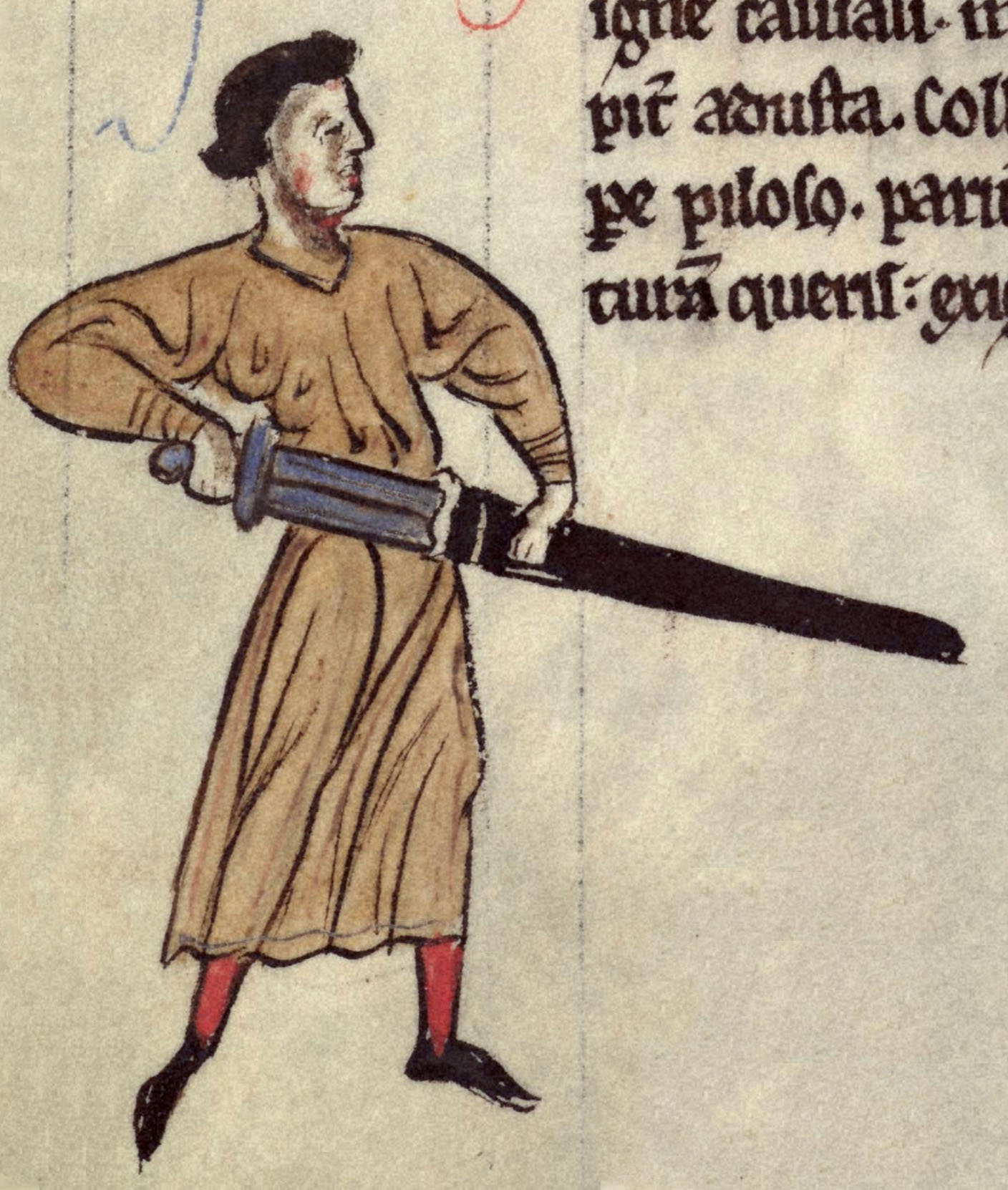
Hugh de Lacy, Lord of Meath, from a manuscript of the Expugnatio Hibernica

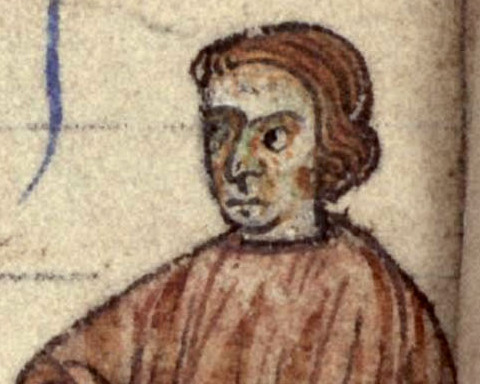
Richard "Strongbow" de Clare, Lord of Leinster through his marriage to Aoife MacMurrough, from a manuscript of the Expugnatio Hibernica

The following is a list of Hiberno-Norman surnames, many of them unique to Ireland, and those of Anglo-Irish noble families.

For example, the prefix Fitz meaning "son of", in surnames like FitzGerald appears most frequently in Hiberno-Norman surnames (cf. modern French "fils de" with the same meaning). However, a few names with the prefix "Fitz-" sound Norman but are actually of native Gaelic origin; Diarmait mac Máel na mBó of the Lyons Uí Dúnchada sept became known as FitzDermot, and FitzPatrick was the surname assumed by Brian Mac Giolla Phádraig under Henry VIII in 1537.

- Athy
- Aylward
- Barrett
- Barron
- Barry
- Bennett
- Beresford
- Birmingham
- Blake
- Blanchfield
- Bodkin
- Boyle
- Brett
- Britton
- Browne
- Burke
- Butler
- Campion
- Cantillon
- Cantwell
- Carew
- Clare
- Codd
- Cody
- Cogan/Coggan/Coogan
- Colbert
- Colfer
- Comerford
- Comiskey
- Condon
- Cooney (can be of Gaelic origin)
- Costello
- Courcey
- Croke (surname)
- Crosbie
- Cullen (can be of Gaelic origin)
- Curtis
- Cusack
- D'Alton
- D'Arcy (Both Norman & normanised Irish Gaels)
- Dawson
- Day
- Deane
- Delaney (can be of Gaelic origin)
- Devereux
- Dillon
- Dolphin
- Eustace
- Fagan
- Fay
- Field
- Filgate
- FitzGerald
- FitzGibbon
- FitzHarris
- FitzHenry
- FitzMaurice
- FitzSimons
- FitzStephen
- FitzWilliam
- Fleming (surname)
- Font
- Fox (can be of Gaelic origin)
- French/Ffrench
- Furlong
- Freaney
- Gault
- Gibbons
- Grace
- Gray/ Grey/ de Grae
- Griffin (can be of Gaelic origin)
- Gore
- Hackett
- Harris
- Hayes (can be of Gaelic origin)
- Hoare/Hore
- Hussey
- Jackman
- Jennings
- Jordan
- Joyce
- Keating
- Kirwin (Normanised Irish Gaels)
- Lacey/De Lacy
- Laffan
- Lambert
- Lawless
- Liston
- Lucey (can be of Gaelic origin)
- Lynch (can be of Gaelic origin)
- Lyons (can be of Gaelic origin)
- MacAndrew
- MacKeown
- MacNicholas
- MacHale
- MacQuillan
- Mansell
- Mockler
- Mansfield
- Marmion
- Martin/Martyn
- Mason
- Mee
- Molyneux
- Morris
- Morrissey (can be of Gaelic origin)
- Nagle
- Nangle
- Nash
- Neville
- Nugent
- Pettitt
- Peppard (surname)
- Plunkett
- Power
- Prendergast
- Punch
- Purcell
- Redmond
- Rice
- Roche
- Rochford
- Rossiter
- Russell
- St John
- St Leger
- Savage
- Sinnott
- Skerritt
- Spain (surname)
- Stack
- Stapleton
- Staunton
- Supple
- Taaffe
- Talbot
- Tobin
- Troy (can be of Gaelic origin)
- Tuite
- Tyrrell
- Wade
- Wadding
- Wall
- Walsh
- Warren
- White/Whyte
- Whitty
- Woulfe
- Whitworth

== Hiberno-Norman texts ==
The annals of Ireland make a distinction between Gaill and Sasanaigh. The former were split into Fionnghaill or Dubhghaill, depending upon how much the poet wished to flatter his patron.

There are a number of texts in Hiberno-Norman French, most of them administrative (including commercial) or legal, although there are a few literary works as well. There is a large amount of parliamentary legislation, including the famous Statute of Kilkenny and municipal documents.

The major literary text is The Song of Dermot and the Earl, a chanson de geste of 3,458 lines of verse concerning Dermot McMurrough and Richard de Clare, 2nd Earl of Pembroke (known as "Strongbow"). Other texts include the Walling of New Ross composed about 1275, and early 14th century poems about the customs of Waterford.

== See also ==
- The Deeds of the Normans in Ireland
- Later Medieval Ireland (1185 to 1284)
- Tribes of Galway
- Irish nobility
- Norman Ireland

Normans elsewhere

- Italo-Norman
- Scoto-Norman
