= Fitz =

Prefix in patronymic surnames of Anglo-Norman origin

Fitz (pronounced "fits") was a patronymic indicator used in Anglo-Norman England to help distinguish individuals by identifying their immediate predecessors. Meaning "son of", it would precede the father's forename, or less commonly a title held by the father. In rare cases, it formed part of a matronymic to associate the bearer with a more prominent mother. Convention among modern historians is to represent the word as fitz, but in the original Norman French documentation, it appears as fiz, filz, or similar forms, deriving from the Old French noun filz, fiz (French fils), meaning "son of", and ultimately from Latin filius (son). Its use during the period of English surname adoption (following the Norman conquest) led to its incorporation into patronymic surnames, and at later periods this form was adopted by English kings for the surnames given some of their recognized illegitimate children, and by Irish families when anglicizing their Gaelic patronymic surnames.

== Origin ==
In Anglo-Norman England, the gentry and nobility were distinguished when named in contemporary documents in one of several ways. For example, some were further identified using a toponymic, which indicated their feudal holdings or the location of their origin, such as with William the Conqueror's adviser Roger de Beaumont (c. 1015–1094), ('Roger of Beaumont'). For others an indication of their societal role was given, as with Robert Despenser (Robert 'the steward'), or a nickname like Alan Rufus (Alan 'the Red'). Finally, some were distinguished simply by associating them with their father's name, some of which used the fitz element. Thus fitz Bernard would indicate the person so referred was "son of Bernard". In its original usage, this was part of the personal name of the bearer, and would change in each generation: Domesday landholder John fitz Richard was father of Eustace fitz John, followed in successive generations by Richard fitz Eustace and John fitz Richard.

In certain cases, it is the title of the father that would form part of a fitz patronymic form. This is seen, for example, with Otuer fitz Count, illegitimate son of Hugh d'Avranches, Earl of Chester (the continental title count being the equivalent of the English earl), while several illegitimate children of the Norman and early Angevin kings were called fitz Roy, which means "son of the king" in Anglo-Norman French. Some examples being Henry fitz Roy, son of Henry I, and Richard fitz Roy, son of king John.

As family identity strengthened, these personal patronymics evolved into patronymic surnames, locking into a particular form passed unchanged to successive family members independent of the given names in each generation, such as with the FitzAlan family, who used that surname from the mid-12th century, though more frequently the generational patronymic forms were abandoned in favor of a toponymic. In some cases the Fitz surnames have preserved pet forms of the paternal name, such as FitzGibbon or FitzHarris (representing pet forms of Gilbert and Henry, respectively). There are also examples of the Fitz surname element appearing alone, either as a shortening of an original full patronymic surname, or originally distinguishing a son from his father of the same name (Roger fitz, Roger 'the son'), then used by descendants as a hereditary surname.

In some circumstances, it was instead the mother who was memorialized in a fitz name form, making it a matronymic. This is seen with the name of a noteworthy mother, as with William fitz Empress, Robert fitz Wimarc, and Robert fitz Pernell, a byname of Robert de Beaumont, 4th Earl of Leicester, or to distinguish like-named brothers with different mothers, such as Robert fitz Edith, born to Henry I's mistress Edith and distinct from another of the king's bastards born to a different mother, Robert, 1st Earl of Gloucester.

== Irish usage ==
The use of the term "Fitz" in Ireland had two independent origins. The Irish surname FitzGerald, for example, is thought to derive from Gerald de Windsor, a Cambro-Norman nobleman whose son and grandson were involved in the Norman invasion of Ireland. However, other forms, such as Fitzpatrick, were of native Irish origin. This name is an anglicization of the Gaelic patronymic surname Mac Giolla Phádraig, the name changed by monarchical decree of Henry VIII as part of the family's submission under the Crown's surrender and regrant policy throughout the 1530s and 1540s.

== Revival ==
Starting in the Stuart era (1603–1714), there was a revival of the adoption of fitz surname forms, particularly for illegitimate children of kings, princes, or high nobility. For example, Fitzroy for the children of Charles II and one of his mistresses, the Duchess of Cleveland; FitzJames, for the illegitimate children of king James II (1685–1688) and Arabella Churchill; FitzClarence for those of Duke of Clarence, later King William IV (1830–1837) by Mrs. Jordan; and FitzGeorge, for the sons born to the legally prohibited marriage of Prince George, Duke of Cambridge (1819–1904) with Sarah Fairbrother, who would refer to herself as Mrs. FitzGeorge. This practice by the late royalty gave rise to the erroneous belief that historical instances of Fitz surnames also denoted illegitimacy, which was not the case. In 1834, the Baronet Sir Robert Wygram obtained royal licence to make "a fanciful alteration" of his surname to Fitzwygram.

== In the arts ==
In the arts, the prefix Fitz has been used to connote nobility. Walter Scott's Ivanhoe (1819) includes a Lord Waldemar Fitzurse, a noble advisor of prince John. Ben Jonson's play The Devil Is an Ass (1616) includes the eccentric and foolish Norfolk squire named Fabian Fitzdottrell, a name evoking the dotterel, viewed by Jacobeans as a foolish bird, while Anthony Trollope's 1862 novel Orley Farm features the fictional rakishly aristocratic figure Lord John Fitzjoly. In Jane Austen's famous novel Pride and Prejudice (1813), a major character is named Fitzwilliam Darcy. More recently, Robin Hobb's fantasy Farseer trilogy (1995–1997) feature a royal bastard, the assassin FitzChivalry "Fitz" Farseer.

== Examples ==
=== Historic persons ===
==== Medieval ====
- Turstin FitzRolf (fl. 1066)
- William FitzOsbern, 1st Earl of Hereford (1020–1071), a relative and close counsellor of William the Conqueror
- Pain fitzJohn before 1100 – 10 July 1137
- William FitzRalph (1140–1200) the High Sheriff of Nottinghamshire, Derbyshire and the Royal Forests from 1169 to 1177
- Fulk I FitzWarin (died 1170/1), son of Warin of Metz, and progeny of same name (see Baron FitzWarin) surviving until Fulk XI FitzWarin, 7th Baron FitzWarin (1405–1420)
- Henry II of England (died 1189), son of Empress Matilda, known as Henry FitzEmpress
- Reginald Fitzurse (1145–1173)
- Robert de Beaumont, 4th Earl of Leicester (died 1204, alias Robert FitzPernel)
- Robert FitzWalter, 1st Baron FitzWalter (1247–1326)
- Ivo FitzWaryn (1347–1414) whose daughter, Alice, married Richard Whittington (Note: In the legend Dick Whittington and His Cat, he is known as Fitzwarren and brings up Whittington.)
- William FitzStephen, remarked on the Tower of London

=== Prominent families ===
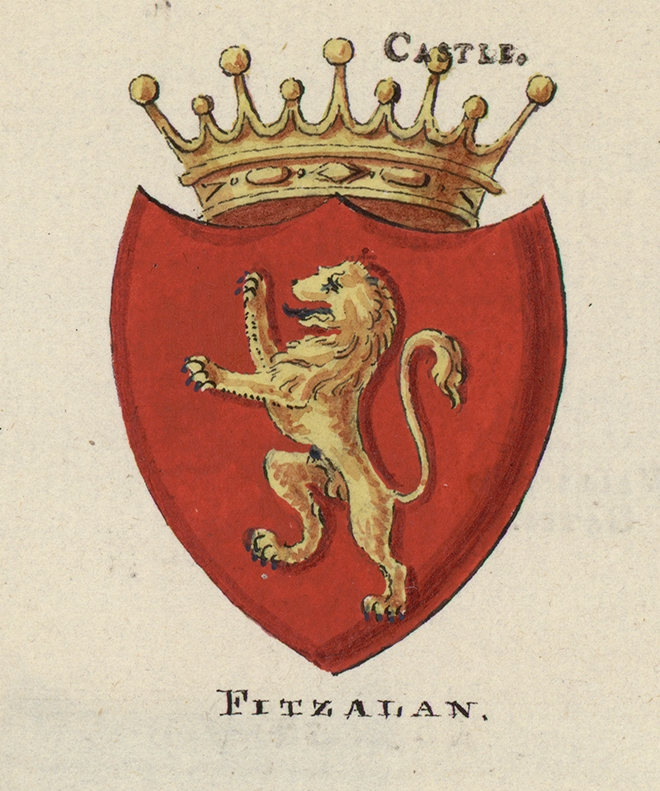
Coat of arms of the FitzAlan family

(Names are variously spelled with or without a space and capital letter after "Fitz-")

- FitzAlan (see Duke of Norfolk, Viscount FitzAlan of Derwent)
- FitzClarence (late 18th century; see King William IV)
- Fitzduncan
- FitzGeorge
- FitzGerald (see Baron Fitzgerald, Duke of Leinster, Earl of Dunmore, FitzGerald baronets)
- Fitzgibbon
- Fitzgilbert
- Fitzharris
- Fitzhenry
- FitzHerbert (see Baron Stafford, FitzHerbert baronets)
- Fitzhugh
- FitzJames
- FitzJohn
- Fitzmaurice (see Marquess of Lansdowne)
- Fitzmorris
- Fitzpatrick
- Fitzrichard
- Fitzroy (see Duke of Grafton, Viscount Daventry)
- Fitzsimon
- Fitzsimons
- Fitzstephen
- FitzThomas
- Fitzwarren
- Fitzwater
- Fitzwilliam (see Earl Fitzwilliam)

== Other uses ==
Fitz is also a stand-alone German surname originating in the Palatinate region of Germany.

== See also ==
- Ben (Hebrew)
