= Whitworth (surname) =

Whitworth is a surname.

Notable people with the surname include:

- Andrew Whitworth (born 1981), American football offensive lineman
- Armstrong Whitworth, English manufacturing company
- Benjamin Whitworth, Irish Politician
- Earl Whitworth, extinct English title
- George Whitworth (disambiguation)

- George F. Whitworth (1816–1907), American missionary
- George Whitworth (footballer, born 1896) (1896–?), English footballer
- George Whitworth (footballer, born 1927) (1927–2006), English footballer

- Jennings B. Whitworth (1908–1960), American college sports coach
- Jerry Whitworth (born 1939), US Navy communications specialist convicted of spying for the Soviet Union
- John Whitworth (disambiguation)

- John Whitworth (RAF officer) (1912–1974), Royal Air Force pilot
- John Whitworth (musician) (1921–2013), English countertenor, organist, and teacher of music
- John Whitworth (poet) (1945–2019), British poet

- Johnny Whitworth (born 1975), American actor
- Joseph Whitworth (1803–1887), English engineer
- Judith Whitworth, Australian medical researcher
- Julia Whitworth, American priest
- Thomas Whitworth, Irish Politician
- Kathy Whitworth, American golfer
- Porter Whitworth (1827–1892), English major general
- R. P. Whitworth (1831–1901), Australian journalist and author
- Robert Whitworth (disambiguation)
- Steve Whitworth, (born 1952) English footballer
- Victoria Whitworth (1966–), Anglo-Scots writer, archaeologist and art historian
- Wallis Whitworth (1855–1927), first director of Birmingham Museum and Art Gallery
- Wilfred Whitworth, English rugby league footballer of the 1930s and 1940s
- William Whitworth (disambiguation)
