= Morrissey (surname) =

- Pronunciation: /ˈmɒrɪsi/ MORR-iss-ee

Origin
- Language: Irish
- Origin: Ó Muirgheasa
- Meaning: Son of Muirgheas ("Sea-choice")

Other names
- Anglicisation: Morrissey

Morrissey is an Irish surname. Notable people with the surname include:

== In arts and entertainment ==
=== Acting ===
- Alan Morrissey (born 1982), British actor
- Betty Morrissey (1908–1944), American film actress
- Bill Morrissey (born 1986) , professional wrestler who performs as Colin Cassady
- David Morrissey (born 1964), actor
- Eamon Morrissey (actor) (born 1943), Irish actor
- Neil Morrissey (born 1962), English actor
- Will Morrissey (1887–1957), American vaudevillian producer, lyricist, actor

=== Literature ===
- Di Morrissey, Australian novelist
- Donna Morrissey, Canadian author
- Ed Morrissey, conservative American blogger
- Kim Morrissey, Canadian poet and playwright
- Michael J T Morrissey (born 1942), New Zealand poet and author
- Paul Morrissey (comics), comic book editor and writer
- Sinéad Morrissey, poet from Northern Ireland

=== Music ===
- Morrissey (born 1959), English singer-songwriter
- Bill Morrissey, American folk singer/songwriter
- Chris Morrissey (musician)
- Dick Morrissey, British jazz musician

=== Other arts ===
- Edward Morrissey (director), American film director
- Marty Morrissey, commentator with the sports department of Radio Telefís Éireann
- Paul Morrissey (1938–2024), American film director
- Paul C. Morrissey, comedian
- Peter Morrissey, Australian fashion designer
- Will Morrissey, (1887–1957), American vaudevillian producer, lyricist, and actor

== In government and politics ==
=== Ireland ===
- Daniel Morrissey (1895–1981), Irish politician who sat in Dáil Éireann for thirty-five years
- John Morrissey (1831–1878), Irish born American boxer and politician
- Michael Morrissey (politician) (died 1947), Irish politician; member of Fianna Fáil
- Tom Morrissey (politician), Irish Progressive Democrats politician

=== United States ===
- Andrew M. Morrissey (1871–1933), Chief Justice of the Nebraska Supreme Court
- Ed Morrissey, conservative American blogger
- Francis X. Morrissey (1910–2007), Massachusetts judge
- Joseph D. Morrissey, an American politician from Virginia
- Larry Morrissey, mayor of Rockford, Illinois
- Michael W. Morrissey (born 1954), District Attorney of Norfolk County, Massachusetts
- Patrick Morrisey (born 1967), Governor of West Virginia

=== Other countries ===
- Alice Morrissey (died in 1912), British Catholic, socialist leader and suffragette
- Bobby Morrissey, Canadian politician from Prince Edward Island
- Brian Morrissey, co-founder of the Canadian Food Inspection Agency
- Edmund Morrissey (1914–1965), member of the Australian Labor Party
- Gerry Morrissey, British trade unionist and current General Secretary of BECTU
- Joy Morrissey, British Member of Parliament elected 2019

== In sport ==
=== Baseball ===
- Frank Morrissey (baseball) (1876–1939), pitcher in Major League Baseball in the early twentieth century
- John Morrissey (baseball) (1856–1884), American Major League Baseball player
- Tom Morrissey (baseball), (1860–1941), American Major League Baseball player

=== Football/rugby/soccer ===
- Brian Morrissey (rugby player), a former New Zealand rugby union player
- George Morrissey (1883–1964), Australian rules footballer
- Gordon Morrissey (1894–1970), former Australian rules footballer
- James Morrissey (footballer), former Australian rules footballer
- Johnny Morrissey, English footballer
- Tom Morrissey (Gaelic footballer)
- William Morrissey (rugby union) (born circa 1889), rugby union player representing Australia

=== Hurling ===
- Dick Morrissey (hurler), Irish hurler
- Eamon Morrissey (hurler), former Irish sportsperson
- Martin Óg Morrissey (1934–2024), Irish sportsperson
- Paul Morrissey (hurler) (born 1980), Irish hurler
- Tom Morrissey (hurler) (born 1996), Irish hurler

=== Other sports ===
- Frank Morrissey, former American football player and coach
- Jim Morrissey (American football), former professional American football player
- Jimmy Morrissey (born 1998), American football player
- John Morrissey (1831–1878), Irish born American boxer and politician
- Thomas Morrissey (athlete), American long-distance runner
- Josh Morrissey, Canadian ice hockey defenseman
- Steven Morrissey (footballer), Jamaican football player
- Big Bill (wrestler) (William Morrissey; born 1986), American professional wrestler

== In other fields ==
- Andrew Morrissey (1860–1921), Irish-American priest and President of the University of Notre Dame
- Edward Morrissey, second ex-husband of Rev. Mary Manin Morrissey
- Helena Morrissey, English businesswoman
- James Morrissey (PR consultant), PR agent and spokesperson for billionaire Denis O'Brien
- Mary Manin Morrissey, New Thought minister from Oregon, US

== See also ==
- Énrí Ó Muirgheasa, Irish civil servant
