= Cantillon =

Cantillon is a surname. Notable people with the surname include:

- Daniel Cantillon (born 1945), American fencer
- Estelle Cantillon, economist
- Joe Cantillon (1861–1930), American baseball manager and umpire
- Marie André Cantillon (1781/82 - 1869), French army officer and failed assassin
- Paddy Cantillon (fl. 1901), Irish hurler
- Phil Cantillon (born 1976), British rugby league footballer
- Richard Cantillon (c. 1680 – 1734), Irish-French economist
  - Cantillon effect, economic concept proposed by Richard Cantillon

== See also ==
- Cantillon Brewery, a Belgian brewery
