= Cooney =

Cooney may refer to:

- Cooney (surname), a surname of Irish origin
- Cooney Weiland, inducted into the Hockey Hall of Fame in 1971
- Cooney, New Mexico
- Cooney, Ohio
