= Fitzrichard =

Origin
- Meaning: "son of Richard"
- Region of origin: England

Other names
- Variant form: Richard

Fitzrichard is a Hiberno-Norman surname. It is patronymic as the prefix Fitz- derives from the Latin filius, meaning "son of". Its variants include the alternate forms FitzRichard, fitz Richard and Fitz Richard, and the given name turned surname Richard or Richards. Fitzrichard is rare as a given name. People with the name Fitzrichard include the brothers:

- Gilbert Fitz Richard (1065–1115), English peer
- Robert Fitz Richard (1064–1136), English landowner
- Philip of Cognac (1180–1211), son of Richard the Lionheart

== See also ==
- Fitz
- Richard
