= Fitzharris =

Origin
- Meaning: "son of Harry"
- Region of origin: Ireland

Fitzharris is an Irish surname of Norman origin and is a variation of Fitzhenry. It is patronymic as the prefix Fitz- derives from the Latin filius, meaning "son of". The Fitzharris family settled in County Wexford

People with the Fitzharris surname

- Bob Fitzharris (1946-2024), British Anglican priest.
- Edward Fitzharris (1648?-1681), an Anglo-Irish conspirator. He was prosecuted for his involvement in alleged Popish Plot.
- Sean Fitzharris (born 1991), a Scottish football player, who is without a club after being released by Greenock Morton.

See also

- Fitzharris Baronets
