= Filgate =

Filgate is a surname. Notable people with the surname include:

- Charles Filgate (1849–1930), Irish cricketer
- Eddie Filgate (1915–2017), Irish politician
- Leonard Filgate (born 1947), American artist and illustrator
- Roger Filgate (born 1965), American guitarist
