= Fitzduncan =

Origin
- Meaning: "son of Duncan"
- Region of origin: Scotland

Other names
- Variant form: Duncan

Fitzduncan is a Scottish Hiberno-Norman surname. It is patronymic as the prefix Fitz- derives from the Latin filius, meaning "son of". Its variants include the alternate forms FitzDuncan, fitz Duncan, and Fitz Duncan, and the given name turned surname Duncan. Fitzduncan is rare as a given name. People with the name Fitzduncan include:

- William fitz Duncan (d. 1147), Scottish prince

== See also ==
- Fitz
- Duncan (surname)
- Duncan (given name)
