= J. C. Fisher =

Australian singing teacher and composer

James Churchill Fisher ( 22 March 1826 – 22 March 1891), generally known as J. C. Fisher or J. Churchill Fisher was an Australian singing teacher and composer. He is best known as an advocate of the Tonic Sol-fa system of music teaching, and was responsible for the system's introduction to Australia.

== History ==
Fisher was born in Portsea, Hampshire, England, and had practised as a singer, conductor, and music teacher for several years. As a young man he had a fine tenor voice, and sang with Charles Santley. He also sang with Jack Hatton on numerous occasions.

He emigrated to Australia, arriving in Sydney 24 December 1852 aboard Chaseley. His first public engagement was as conductor of the Sydney Choral Society (also known as the St James Choral Society), which met at the schoolroom, St. James's church, as successor to James Johnson.

From 1855 to 1858 he sang on the opera stage, generally at the Victoria and Prince of Wales theatres, alongside Catherine Hayes, Anna Bishop, Sara Flower, Frank and John Howson, and Messrs. Laglaise, Conlon, Sherwin, Robert Farquharson, Lewis Lavenu, George Loder, and others.

He left the stage and in 1859 took up a position with the Council of Education (later Department of Public Instruction) as teacher at the Marshall Mount National School, in the Illawarra district. While there he introduced the tonic sol-fa system of teaching music as introduced by Rev. J. Curwen.

In 1861 Fisher was transferred to the Fort Street Model School then in 1862 was appointed head master of the Paddington Model School, where he introduced school concerts. These were so successful that his abilities as a teacher of singing were recognised by the Board of National Education, and the tonic sol-fa method was formally approved. In 1867 he was tasked with instructing teachers in the method. He was appointed musical instructor under the Council of Education, a position he held until 1880 when the council was reformed as the Department of Public Education.

A culmination of his work came on 20 February 1868 when he was conductor of a choir of 500 children and 200 adults as the "Vocal Harmony Society" before the Duke of Edinburgh at the Prince of Wales Theatre.
In 1870, he conducted a choir of 700 children and 1300 adults at the great centenary musical festival at the Exhibition Building, (Note: Intercolonial Exhibition Building, Prince Alfred Park Surry Hills, built 1870 demolished 1954) again before Prince Alfred.
He conducted the "J. Churchill Fisher Juvenile Choir" at the unveiling of the Captain Cook statue in Hyde Park in 1879, and again at the opening of the International Exhibition in the Garden Palace on 25 September 1880, when his cantata The Emigrants was performed.
He was a prominent member of various Sydney musical societies.

He finally gained a position with the Department's Examiners and Training Branch in May 1881, but had lost enthusiasm for the job and was asked to resign, which he did in March 1884. He died at Paramatta on his 65th birthday after years of pain and paralysis brought about by meningitis. His remains were buried at Rookwood Cemetery.

== Personal ==
Fisher married Emma Hall (c. 1830 – 21 February 1910) on 16 March 1854 at Wollongong, New South Wales. Of their twelve births only two girls and one boy survived childhood. The singer Emma Fisher was a daughter, but apart from that fact no more has been found.

He was found insolvent in 1870.

He was an excellent painter of landscapes.

== Compositions ==
- Under the Holly, a Christmas cantata to the libretto of R. P. Whitworth, which was first produced in the Masonic Hall, Sydney on 30 January 1866. It was sung by the Sydney Harmonic Society before the Duke of Edinburgh at the Prince of Wales Opera House, Sydney on 22 February 1868.
  - The Land of Gold
  - I've Waited and Watched (both from the cantata and available as separate song sheets)
- The Emigrants to the libretto of "Australie", (Note: Pseudonym of Emilie Matilda Australie (1845-1890)) first produced by the Petersham Musical Society in 1880. The bass solo in this cantata was awarded first prize at the New Zealand Exhibition.
- He also composed numerous voice exercises, dance pieces, and school songs, the latter being noted for their beautiful harmony.
- He also composed and arranged the contents of the "School Song Books" used in New South Wales public schools.
