= Blanchfield =

Blanchfield may refer to:

- Brian Blanchfield (born 1973), American writer
- David Blanchfield (born 2000), Irish hurler
- Dick Blanchfield (1939–2019), Irish hurler
- Erin Blanchfield (born 1999), American mixed martial artist
- Florence A. Blanchfield (1884–1971), United States Army Colonel and superintendent of the Army Nursing Corps
- Liam Blanchfield (born 1996), Irish hurler
- Michael R. Blanchfield (1950–1969), United States Army soldier and a recipient of the United States military's highest decoration
- Paddy Blanchfield (1911–1980), Labour Member of Parliament for Westland and the West Coast
- Peter Blanchfield (1910–1959), Irish hurler
- Todd Blanchfield (born 1991), Australian basketball player
