= Robert Whitworth =

Robert Whitworth may refer to:

- Robert Whitworth (canal engineer) (1734–1799), English land surveyor and canal engineer
- Robert Whitworth (rugby union) (1914–2002), Scottish rugby union player
- R. P. Whitworth (Robert Percy Whitworth, 1831–1901), journalist, writer, and editor active in Australia and New Zealand
- Rob Whitworth (born 1982), British photographer and filmmaker
