= Coggan =

Coggan is a surname. Notable people with the surname include:

- Donald Coggan PC (1909–2000), the 101st Archbishop of Canterbury from 1974 to 1980
- Michael Coggan, Australian news presenter
- Philip Coggan, British business journalist, news correspondent, and author
