= Fitzgilbert =

Origin
- Meaning: "son of Gilbert"
- Region of origin: Normandy French

Other names
- Variant form: Gilbert

Fitzgilbert is a Norman French surname. It is patronymic, since the prefix Fitz- derives from the Latin filius, meaning "son of." Its variants include the alternate forms FitzGilbert, Fitz Gilbert, Fitz-Gilbert, fitz Gilbert, and the given name turned surname Gilbert or Gilberts. Fitzgilbert is rare as a given name. People with the name include:

- Baldwin FitzGilbert (died 1086-1091), Norman nobleman
- John Fitz Gilbert or John Marshal (Marshal of England) (c. 1105–1165), minor Anglo-Norman nobleman
- Richard fitz Gilbert (before 1035–c. 1090), Norman lord who participated in the Norman conquest of England
- Walter fitz Gilbert of Cadzow (died c. 1346), Scottish nobleman
- William FitzGilbert, fifteenth Lord Chancellor of England, from 1141 to 1142
- William de Lancaster I (died c. 1170), English nobleman also known as William Fitz Gilbert

== See also ==
- Richard Fitz Gilbert de Clare (died 1136), Anglo-Norman nobleman
- Fitz
- Gilbert (given name)
