= Aylward =

Aylward is a name that may refer to:

Surname

- Bob Aylward (1911–1974), Irish politician
- Bobby Aylward (1955–2022), Irish politician
- Bruce Aylward, Canadian physician and Assistant Director General of the WHO
- Dick Aylward (1925–1983), American baseball player
- Gladys Aylward (1902–1970), English missionary
- Gordon Aylward, Australian chemist
- James Ambrose Dominic Aylward (1813–1872), English theologian and poet
- James Aylward (cricketer) (1741–1827), English cricketer
- James P. Aylward (1885–1982), American lawyer and politician
- Joan Marie Aylward, Canadian politician
- John Aylward (1946–2022), American actor
- Liam Aylward (born 1952), Irish politician
- Mansel Aylward (1942–2024), Welsh public health physician and academic
- Samkin Aylward, fictional character from Arthur Conan Doyle's novel The White Company
  - Samkin Aylward, a fictional character from S. M. Stirling's Emberverse series novels named after the Doyle character
- Theodore Aylward (1730–1801), English organist

Given name

- Aylward M. Blackman (1883–1956), British Egyptologist
