= Kirwin =

Kirwin may refer to:

== People ==
- Dominick Kirwin (fl. 1642-1653?), an Irish Confederate
- John J. Kirwin (1918–1943), a United States Navy officer and Navy Cross recipient

== Places ==
- Kirwin, Kansas, a town in Phillips County, Kansas, in the United States
- Kirwin National Wildlife Refuge, a nature conservation area near Kirwin, Kansas, in the United States
- Kirwin, Wyoming, a ghost town in Wyoming

== Ships ==
- USS Kirwin (DE-229), a United States Navy destroyer escort converted during construction into the high-speed transport USS Kirwin (APD-90)
- USS Kirwin (APD-90), a United States Navy high-speed transport (later "amphibious transport, small", LPR-90) in commission from 1945 to 1946 and from 1965 to 1969
