= Cooney (surname) =

Cooney (from O'Cooney, Gaelic: "Ó Cuana") is a common Irish surname. In various forms, the name dates back to the 12th century. It is first associated with County Tyrone then in the province of Connaught, in the townland of Ballycooney, Loughrea barony, in County Galway, then to County Clare, County Mayo, and Dublin.

Alternate spellings are O'Conney, Coony, Coonahan, Coonihan, Coonie, Coonan, Coumey (Coomey), Coney and Cooihan. Alternate spellings of O'Cuana are Cuana, Coona, O Cuanaic, and O'Cuanaich. Some with the name Coonifer, Coonihan and Coumey, the latter mainly from County Cork, have been changed into Cooney.

== Surname ==
- Adam Cooney, AFL football player
- America Chedister, born Cooney, American actress
- Andrew Cooney, Irish Republican
- Anne, Eileen and Elizabeth (Lily) Cooney, the Cooney Sisters, Irish Republicans and members of Cumann na mBan
- Barbara Cooney, children's book author/illustrator
- Barney Cooney (1934–2019), Australian politician
- Bob Cooney (1907–1976), American baseball pitcher
- Bob Cooney (activist) (1907–1984), Scottish communist activist, political commissar and poet
- Caroline B. Cooney, author
- Edward Cooney, Irish evangelist
- Eugene Jerome Cooney (born 1931), Canadian Roman Catholic bishop
- Eugenia Cooney
- Gerry Cooney, boxer
- Jack Cooney (born 1971), Gaelic footballer and manager
- James Cooney (1848–1904), Irish-American lawyer
- Sergeant James C. Cooney, Struck gold in southwest New Mexico
- James Cooney (Medal of Honor), American Medal of Honor recipient
- Jeremy Cooney, American politician
- Joan Ganz Cooney (born 1929), American television producer
- John Cooney (1996–2025), Irish boxer
- Johnny Cooney, American professional baseball player
- JP Cooney (born 1980), Irish rugby union player
- Joseph Cooney (born 1991), Irish hurler
- Kara Cooney, American Egyptologist
- Kevin Cooney (baseball) (born 1950), American college baseball coach
- Kyra Cooney-Cross (born 2002), Australian footballer
- Mark Cooney, American football in the NFL
- Mary Cooney, American politician
- Michael Cooney, British screenwriter
- Mike Cooney, American politician, Lieutenant Governor of Montana
- Patrick Cooney (1931–2025), Irish politician
- Patrick H. Cooney (1845–1915), American attorney
- Patrick R. Cooney (1934–2012), American Roman Catholic prelate
- Philip Cooney, former Bush administration official with ties to the energy business lobby (American Petroleum Institute)
- Ray Cooney, British playwright
- Richard T. Cooney, American politician
- Terry Cooney, American baseball umpire
- Thomas C. Cooney, American sailor, Medal of Honor recipient
- Tim Cooney (disambiguation), several people
- Walter R. Cooney Jr., astronomer
- Wayne Cooney, former association football player who played in the League of Ireland during the 1990s

== See also ==
- Cooney Weiland, inducted into the Hockey Hall of Fame in 1971
