= USS Earle B. Hall =

United States Navy high-speed transport

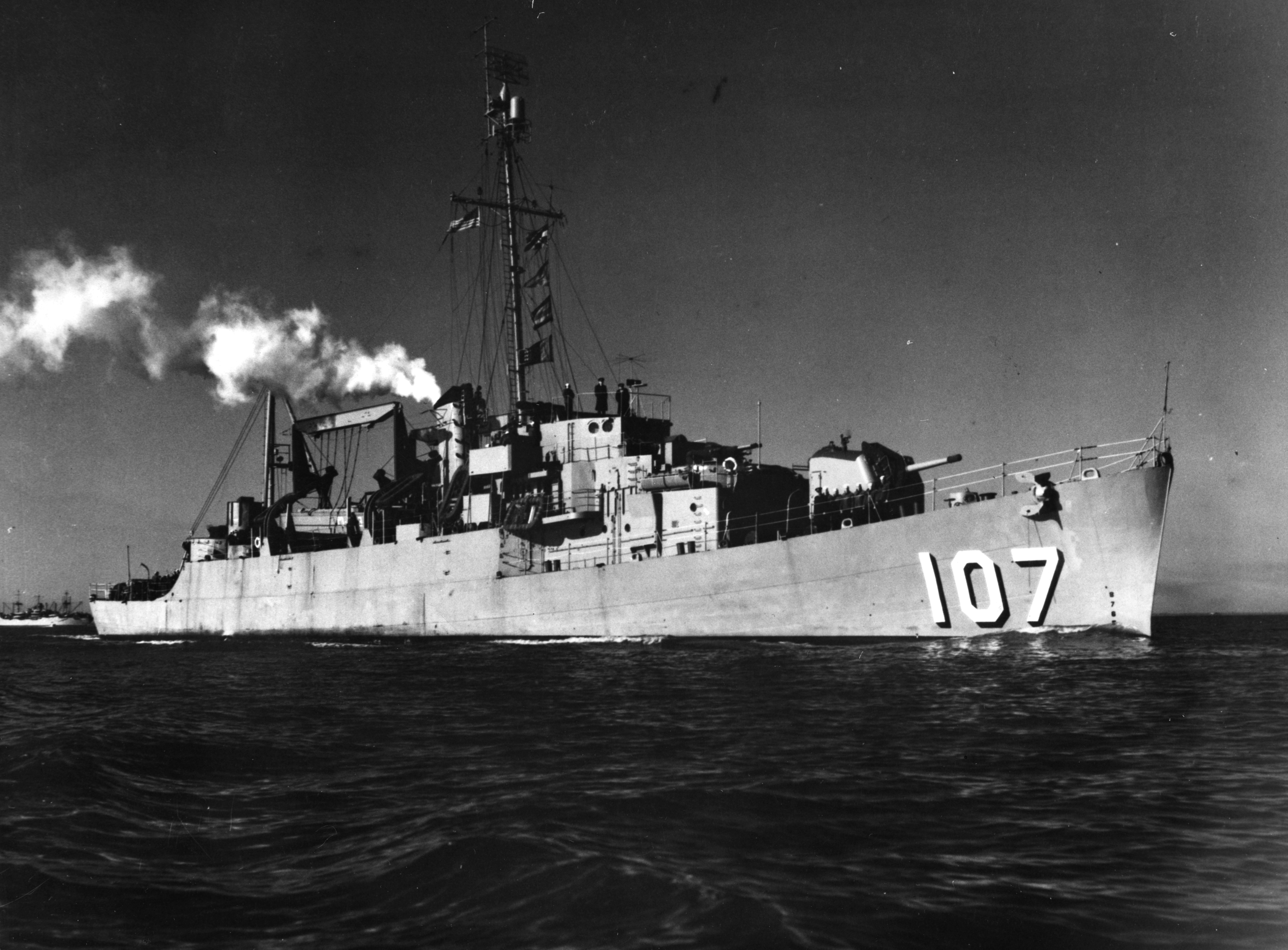
- USS Earle B. Hall in 1950

History

United States
- Name: USS Earle B. Hall
- Namesake: Aviation Machinist's Mate Earle B. Hall (1919–1941), a United States Navy sailor and Air Medal recipient
- Builder: Bethlehem Hingham Shipyard, Inc., Hingham, Massachusetts
- Launched: 1 March 1944
- Sponsored by: Mrs. William Thomas Hall
- Commissioned: 15 May 1945
- Decommissioned: 27 September 1946
- Recommissioned: 7 December 1950
- Decommissioned: 13 September 1957
- Recommissioned: 29 November 1961
- Decommissioned: 15 January 1965
- Reclassified: From destroyer escort (DE-597) to high-speed transport (APD-107) 17 July 1944
- Stricken: 1 February 1965
- Nickname(s): "The Iron Porpoise" and "Versatile Gator"
- Fate: Sold for scrapping 28 January 1966
- Notes: Laid down as Rudderow-class destroyer escort USS Earle B. Hall (DE-597)

General characteristics
- Class & type: Crosley-class high speed transport
- Displacement: 2,130 long tons (2,164 t) full
- Length: 306 ft (93 m)
- Beam: 37 ft (11 m)
- Draft: 12 ft 7 in (3.84 m)
- Speed: 23 knots (43 km/h; 26 mph)
- Troops: 162
- Complement: 204
- Armament: 1 × 5 in (130 mm) gun; 6 × 40 mm guns; 6 × 20 mm guns; 2 × depth charge tracks

USS Earle B. Hall (APD-107), ex-DE-597, was a United States Navy high-speed transport in commission from 1945 to 1946, 1950 to 1957 and 1961 to 1965.

== Namesake ==
Earle Boitnott Hall was born on 25 December 1919 at Dawson Springs, Kentucky. He enlisted in the U.S. Navy in 1938.

On 27 December 1941 Aviation Machinist's Mate Hall was killed action during a patrol mission against Japanese forces on Jolo Island in the Philippine Islands. He was posthumously awarded the Air Medal.

== Construction and commissioning ==
Earle B. Hall was laid down as the Rudderow-class destroyer escort USS Earle B. Hall (DE-597) by Bethlehem Hingham Shipyard, Inc., at Hingham, Massachusetts, and was launched on 1 March 1944, sponsored by Mrs. William Thomas Hall, the mother of Earle B. Hall. The ship was reclassified as a Crosley-class high-speed transport and redesignated APD-107 on 17 July 1944. After conversion to her new role, she was commissioned on 15 May 1945.

== First period in commission, 1945–1946 ==
Earle B. Hall departed Norfolk, Virginia, and reached San Diego, California, on 17 August 1945, two days after the end of World War II. She embarked 90 men for passage to Pearl Harbor, Territory of Hawaii, on 12 September 1945. She arrived at Okinawa on 28 September 1945. While her boats were being converted for shallow-water minesweeping, she carried passengers and minesweeping gear from Buckner Bay, Okinawa, to Sasebo, Japan, and through the Bungo Strait. In December 1945, her boats were returned, and with them, she moved to Wakanoura Bay, below Osaka, Japan, arriving there on 14 December 1945. There she provided logistics support for her boats, sweeping magnetic mines in the shallow waters of the Inland Sea, particularly the major port of Kobe, Japan.

Earle B. Hall put to sea on 25 February 1946, and called at Eniwetok, Pearl Harbor, and San Francisco, California, on her way to Boston, Massachusetts, where she arrived on 9 April 1946. She was decommissioned and placed in reserve at Mayport, Florida, on 27 September 1946.

== Second period in commission, 1950–1957 ==
Recommissioned on 7 December 1950, Earle B. Hall departed Jacksonville, Florida, on 19 December 1950, for her home port, Norfolk, Virginia. After refresher training, she departed Norfolk on 29 May 1951 for a three-month northern cruise, supplying such outposts as Grønnedal, Greenland. Returning to Norfolk, she trained United States Marines in amphibious warfare off Onslow Beach, North Carolina, and in the Caribbean.

Earle B. Hall departed Norfolk on 22 April 1953 for a Mediterranean tour with the United States Sixth Fleet, returning to Norfolk on 26 October 1953.

Local operations off the Virginia Capes alternated with two cruises to Key West, Florida, and Havana, Cuba, and United States Marine Corps amphibious exercises in the Caribbean until 17 June 1955, when she steamed to the Azores; Lisbon, Portugal; and Cádiz, Spain on a midshipman cruise, returning to Norfolk on 15 July 1955.

The remainder of Earle B. Hall's service during her second commission was spent on the East Coast of the United States and training in the Caribbean. She was decommissioned and again placed in reserve on 13 September 1957.

== Third period in commission, 1961–1965 ==
Earle B. Hall was recommissioned on 29 November 1961 at either the New York Naval Shipyard at Brooklyn, New York, or at Naval Amphibious Base Little Creek at Virginia Beach, Virginia.

President John F. Kennedy observed Earle B. Hall on 13 and 14 April 1962 during his visit to Norfolk. She then departed for Vieques Island, off Puerto Rico, where she participated in a three-week joint U.S.Navy-U.S. Marine Corps exercise maneuver involving 83 United States Atlantic Fleet ships that climaxed with an amphibious assault on Vieques Island. From 10 October to 7 December 1962, Earle B. Hall operated in support of the blockade—or "quarantine"—of Cuba during the Cuban Missile Crisis.

[History needed for 1962–1964]

During the autumn of 1964 Earle B. Hall suffered a major engineering failure that caused her to lose all power while underway, and it was decided that she would be retired from service. To replace her, high-speed transport USS Kirwin (APD-90), which had been in reserve since decommissioning in 1946, arrived under tow at Little Creek on 30 November 1964 and was moored alongside Earle B. Hall. Earle B. Hall's crew then set about preparing Kirwin for reactivation.

== Final decommissioning and disposal ==
On 15 January 1965, Earle B. Hall was decommissioned for the last time. Simultaneously, USS Kirwin was recommissioned, and Earle B. Hall's crew transferred to Kirwin.

Earle B. Hall was stricken from the Naval Vessel Register on 1 February 1965. She was sold for scrapping on 28 January 1966.
