= Will Morrissey =

William James Morrissey (19 June 1887 – 16 December 1957) was an American lyricist, vaudeville actor, playwright, and theatrical producer principally based in New York City, but also a frequent performer and producer on the West Coast and Chicago.

== Career ==
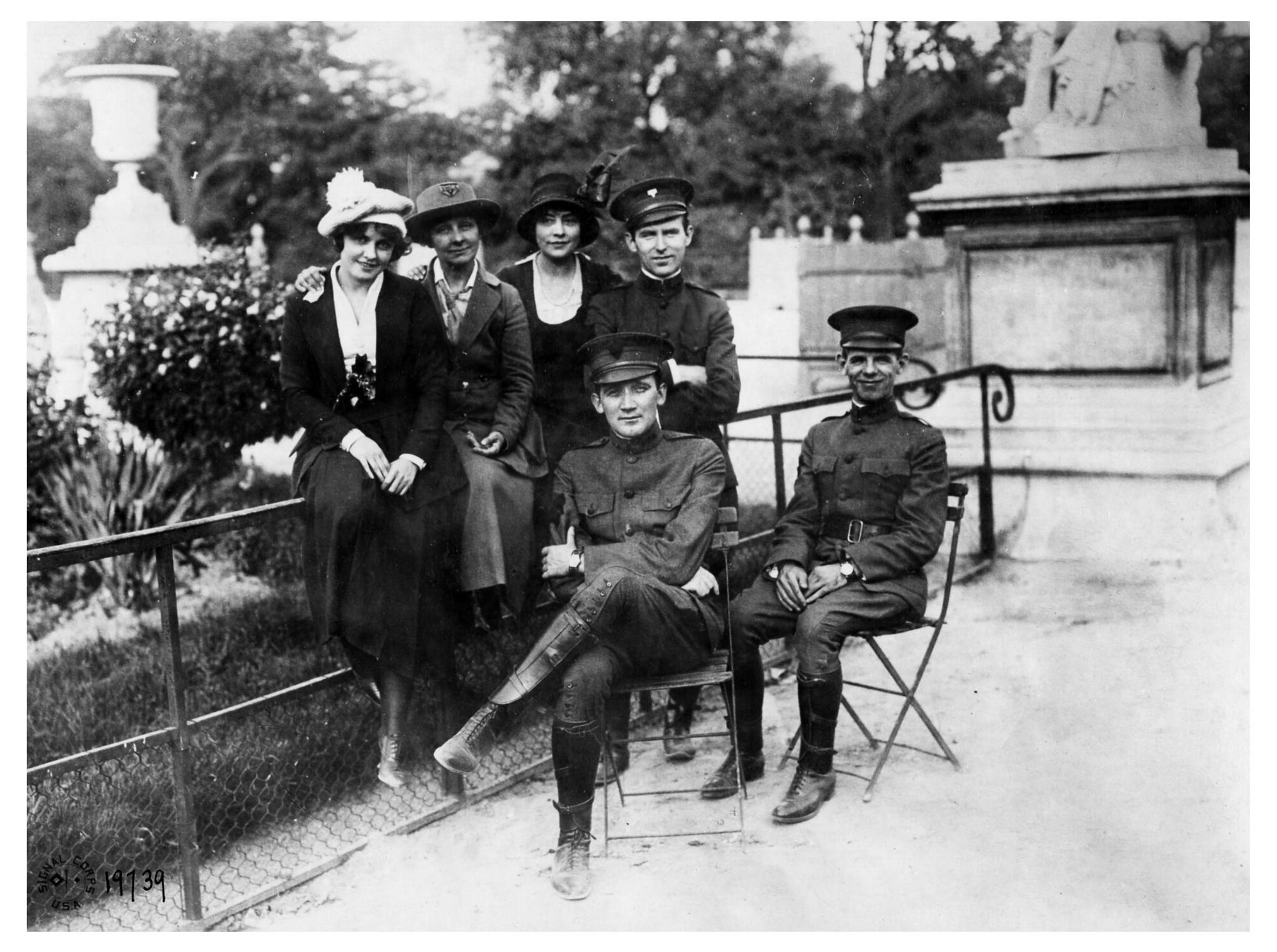
Members of the Over There company in France, entertain the soldiers, August 25, 1918

During the First World War, he came, in August 1918, with the Mayo's Shock Unit of the Y.M.C.A. to entertain the American troops in France for 3 months. America's Over There Theater League Units, featuring Margaret Mayo, Lois Meredith, Bill Morrissey, Tommy Gray and Raymond Walker, perform the musical Somewhere in America.

Among other things, he produced, in 1919, Overseas Review, with music by Richard Whiting and Ray Eagen. Overseas Review was an assorted compilation and partial reunion of vaudevillians in the Armed Forces from the Over There Review performed in the European theatre of World War I.

Morrissey's 1935 production of Saluda, which debuted in The Bronx, was the first show that starred Milton Berle. Morrissey also wrote additional dialog for the 1947 film, Look-Out Sister, an Astor Pictures production. He produced the 1928 radio broadcast of The Morrissey & Miller Night Club Revue. Morrissey played the part of an announcer in the 1952 film, The Story of Will Rogers, a Warner-Bros. production. Morrissey worked with Martha Raye, Billy Rose, Jack Oakie, Gracie Allen, and Hugh Herbert.

Some of his early compositions, such as "Please, Oh Please" (1913), credit him as Billy J. Morrissey.

== Education ==
Growing up, Morrissey had studied at the Brooklyn School of Music. Sometime prior to 1905, Morrissey earned a civil engineering degree from the Stevens Institute.

== Family ==
Morrissey was married seven times. As a gag, Billy Rose, without telling Morrissey, once invited Morrissey's seven former wives to an opening of one of Rose's shows. His first two wives Elizabeth Brice (née Bessie Shaler; 1883–1965) and Madgie Miller – were actresses.
