= Michael Coggan =

Australian news presenter

Michael Coggan is an Australian news presenter who is the lead anchor for the ABC News in the Northern Territory.

Coggan's career began as a broadcast journalist in Canberra. From there he began political reporting for ABC News in Darwin where he covered every Territory election. At the end of 2005 Coggan replaced anchor Barbara McCarthy when she ran for the Northern Territory political seat of Arnhem. Coggan reports for the local edition of the ABC program Stateline.
