= FitzThomas =

The name FitzThomas or Fitzthomas may refer to one of the following:

- Piers FitzThomas Butler of Duiske (died 1601), illegitimate son of Thomas Butler, 10th Earl of Ormond.
- James FitzThomas FitzGerald (died 1608), the Súgán Earl of Desmond and eldest son of Sir Thomas Fitzgerald, commonly called "Thomas Roe," "Tomás Ruadh" or "Red Thomas"
- John FitzThomas FitzGerald, 1st Earl of Kildare, (c. 1250 – d. 10 September 1316), Irish nobleman in the Peerage of Ireland, as 4th Lord of Offaly from 1287 and subsequently as 1st Earl of Kildare from 1316
- John FitzThomas FitzGerald, 1st Baron Desmond (died 1261), grandson of Maurice FitzGerald, Lord of Lanstephan
- Maurice FitzThomas FitzGerald, 1st Earl of Desmond (died 25 January 1356), Irish nobleman in the Peerage of Ireland, Captain of Desmond Castle in Kinsale, so-called ruler of Munster, and for a short time Lord Justice of Ireland
- Maurice FitzThomas FitzGerald, 4th Earl of Kildare (died 25 August 1390), prominent Irish nobleman in the Peerage of Ireland and Lord Justice of Ireland
- Hugo Hawksley Fitzthomas Summerson (born 21 July 1950), British Conservative politician.
