= Estelle Cantillon =

Belgian economist

- Born: Antwerp, Belgium

Academic background
- Education: Université de Bruxelles (M.Sc 1994); Cambridge University (M.Phil 1995); Harvard University (Ph.D 2000)

Academic work
- Discipline: Public economics
- Institutions: Université de Bruxelles
- Website: Information at IDEAS / RePEc

Estelle Cantillon is a Belgian economist. She is currently FNRS Research Director at the Université libre de Bruxelles, a position she has held since 2016. Cantillon is also an associated researcher at the Toulouse School of Economics. Cantillon currently serves as the Joint Managing Editor at the Economic Journal and is an associate editor at the RAND Journal of Economics. She also holds appointments as a member of WZB Berlin's Advisory Board, research fellow at the Centre for Economic Policy Research, and committee member of Rethinking Belgium, “Matching in Practice” research network, and the European Economic Association. She has previously taught at Harvard Business School, Harvard Kennedy School, and Yale University. Cantillon's professional interests are microeconomics, market design, industrial organization and environmental economics. Her research typically combines theory and data. Currently, her research focuses on carbon emissions markets, the design of electricity wholesale markets, and climate transition policies. She is fluent in French and English and has passive knowledge of Dutch, German, and Spanish.

== Education ==
In 1992, Cantillon completed the first two years of B.Sc. in physics at the Université libre de Bruxelles. In 1994, Cantillon achieved an M.Sc. in management and applied sciences there. Following this, Cantillon achieved an M.Phil. in economics at the University of Cambridge in 1995, and in 2000, gained her Ph.D. in economics at Harvard University.

== Research ==
Cantillon's research is based on the boundary between market design and industrial organization which combines theory and data. Cantillon's research is focused on multi-attribute procurement, the design of emissions markets and school choice.

== Awards and honours ==
- Young Economist Award, European Association of Research in Industrial Economics, 2000.
- David A. Wells Prize for Best Ph.D. Dissertation, Harvard University, 2000.
- Richard Hodgson Fellow, Harvard Business School, 2002–2003.
- Fellowship, Baron Alexandre Lamfalussy, European Central Bank, 2005.
- ULB Foundation Prize, 2010.
- Fellow, European Economic Association, 2010.
- Francqui Chair, Université Saint Louis, 2018–2019.

== Selected bibliography ==
=== Chapters ===
- Developments in Data for Economic Research (with 19 other authors), in: R. Blundell et al. (2017), Economics without Borders – Economic Research for European Policy Challenges, Cambridge University Press.
- Auctions for the support of renewables : When and how ?, report for DG COMP (European Commission), August 2014
- What support mechanism is needed for flexible capacity in Belgium?, in A. Estache (ed.), The Next Generation of Economic Issues in Energy Policy in Europe, CEPR, 2014.
- Mixité sociale: le rôle des procédures d’inscriptions scolaires, in : Ph. Maystadt et al. (Eds), Proceedings of the 20th Congress of Belgian French-speaking Economists, November 2013, CIFoP editions (on the role of the school choice mechanism in promoting social diversity in school intakes)
- Quel enfant dans quelle école? Réflexions sur les inscriptions scolaires en Belgique (with Nicolas Gothelf), in: de Calataÿ et al. (Eds), Proceedings of the 18thCongress of Belgian French-speaking Economists, November 2009, CIFoP Editions.
- Auctioning Bus Routes: The London Experience (with Martin Pesendorfer), in: Peter Cramton, Yoav Shoham and Richard Steinberg (eds.), Combinatorial Auctions, MIT Press, January 2006.
- Quality Issues in Contracts - Great Britain (with Yves Mathieu), Proceedings of the Annual Conference of the International Association for Public Transport (UITP), Florence, Italy, April 1995.

=== Edited books ===
- Blundell, R., E. Cantillon, B. Chizzolini, M. Ivaldi, W. Leininger, R. Marimon, L. Matyas, F. Steen (2017), Economics without Borders – Economic Research for European Policy Challenges, Cambridge University Press.
- Maystadt, Ph., E. Cantillon, L. Denayer, P. Pestieau, B. Van der Linden and M. Cattelain (2013), Le Modèle social belge: Quel avenir? (The future of the Belgian Social Model), Proceedings of the 20th Congress of the Belgian French-speaking economists, CIFoP editions.

=== Journals ===
- Cantillon, E. (2001). Electoral Rules and the Emergence of New Issue Dimensions, Cowles Foundation Discussion Papers 1291, Cowles Foundation for Research in Economics, Yale University.
- Cantillon, E & Pesendorfer, M, (2007). Combination Bidding in Multi-Unit Auctions, CEPR Discussion Papers 6083, C.E.P.R. Discussion Papers.
- Cantillon, E., & Yin, P. (2008). Competition between exchanges: Lessons from the battle of the bund doi:10.2139/ssrn.1085296
