= USS Kirwin =

1944 Crosley-class high speed transport

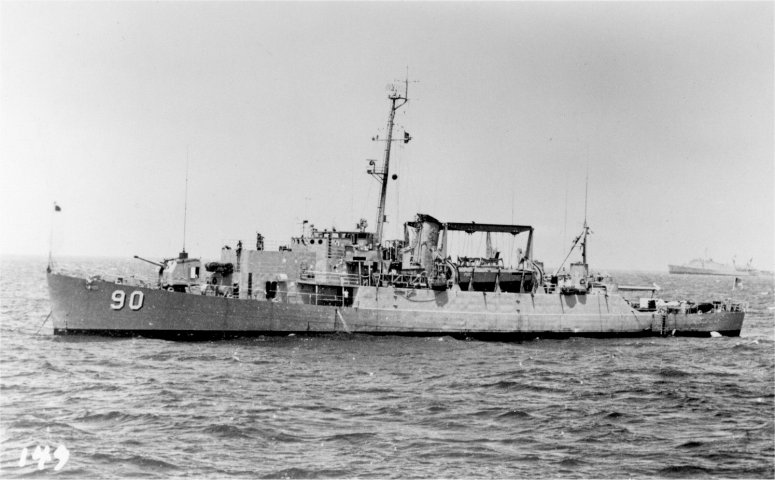
- USS Kirwin in 1968

History

United States
- Name: USS Kirwin
- Namesake: Lieutenant John J. Kirwin (1918-1943), a U.S. Navy officer and Navy Cross recipient
- Builder: Philadelphia Navy Yard, Philadelphia, Pennsylvania
- Laid down: 14 February 1944
- Launched: 15 June 1944
- Sponsored by: Mrs. Andrew J. Kirwin
- Commissioned: 4 November 1945
- Decommissioned: 6 April 1946
- Recommissioned: 15 January 1965
- Decommissioned: 1969
- Reclassified: From destroyer escort (DE-229) to high-speed transport (APD-90) 17 July 1944; Amphibious transport, small (LPR-90) 1 January 1969
- Stricken: 15 September 1974
- Fate: Sold for scrapping 11 August 1975
- Notes: Laid down as Rudderow-class destroyer escort USS Kirwin (DE-229)

General characteristics
- Class & type: Crosley-class high speed transport
- Displacement: 2,130 long tons (2,164 t) full
- Length: 306 ft (93 m)
- Beam: 37 ft (11 m)
- Draft: 12 ft 7 in (3.84 m)
- Speed: 23 knots (43 km/h; 26 mph)
- Troops: 162
- Complement: 204
- Armament: 1 × 5 in (130 mm) gun; 6 × 40 mm guns; 6 × 20 mm guns; 2 × depth charge tracks

USS Kirwin (APD-90), ex-DE-229, later LPR-90, was a United States Navy high-speed transport in commission from 1945 to 1946 and from 1965 to 1969.

== Namesake ==
John Joseph Kirwin was born on 4 July 1918 in Newport, Rhode Island. He enlisted in the United States Naval Reserve on 11 December 1935. He was appointed midshipman on 11 August 1937, and commissioned as an ensign on 7 February 1941, reporting for duty aboard light cruiser USS Savannah.

During World War II, Kirwin was appointed Lieutenant, junior grade, on 16 June 1942, and saw action aboard Savannah in the Battle of the Atlantic and in Operation Torch, the Allied invasion of North Africa. He was promoted to Lieutenant on 1 December 1942, and saw further combat aboard Savannah in Operation Husky, the Allied invasion of Sicily.

Savannah then supported Operation Avalanche, the Allied invasion of mainland Italy at Salerno. On 11 September 1943, while bombarding German shore defenses in Salerno Bay, Savannah was among cruisers which came under heavy German aerial attack. The cruisers and British fighters drove off nearly 60 German bombers before a Dornier Do 217K-2 bomber hit Savannah with a Fritz X radio-controlled, armor-piercing guided bomb. It pierced the armored roof of the No. 3 gun turret immediately in front of the ship's bridge, passed through three decks into the lower shell-handling room, and exploded there, blowing a gaping hole in the ship's bottom, and tearing open a seam in the ship's port side. For 30 minutes, secondary explosions in the gun room hampered fire-fighting efforts.

Kirwin was at his battle station as turret officer in No. 3 turret when the bomb struck. He remained behind in the turret to supervise the evacuation of as many men as possible, was overcome by heat and toxic smoke, and died at his station. Kirwin was posthumously awarded the Navy Cross.

== Construction and commissioning ==
Kirwin was laid down as the Rudderow-class destroyer escort USS Kirwin (DE-229) on 14 February 1944 by the Philadelphia Navy Yard at Philadelphia, Pennsylvania, and was launched on 15 June 1944, sponsored by Mrs. Andrew J. Kirwin, the mother of the ship's namesake. The ship was reclassified as a Crosley-class high-speed transport and redesignated APD-90 on 17 July 1944. After conversion to her new role, she was commissioned on 4 November 1945.

== First period in commission, 1945-1946 ==
After shakedown in the Chesapeake Bay, Kirwin cleared Norfolk, Virginia, on 29 January 1946, and arrived at Green Cove Springs, Florida, on 31 January 1946. She was decommissioned there on 6 April 1946 and placed in reserve there on the St. Johns River in the Florida Group of the Atlantic Reserve Fleet.

== Second period in commission, 1965-1969 ==
In the autumn of 1964, the high-speed transport USS Earle B. Hall (APD-107) suffered a major engineering casualty that caused her to lose all power, and she was deemed not worth repairing. Kirwin was chosen to replace her. Accordingly, on 30 November 1964, Kirwin arrived under tow at Naval Amphibious Base Little Creek at Virginia Beach, Virginia, and was berthed alongside Earle B. Hall. There Kirwin underwent reactivation, with Earle B. Hall's crew readying her for recommissioning. On 15 January 1965, after almost 19 years in reserve, Kirwin was recommissioned and Earle B. Hall was simultaneously decommissioned, with Earle B. Hall's crew transferring to Kirwin.

In February 1965, Kirwin moved to Newport News, Virginia, for overhaul. She got underway for Guantanamo Bay, Cuba, on 6 July 1965 and spent the next five weeks on nuclear defense, antisubmarine warfare, and gunnery exercises. She visited San Juan, Puerto Rico, then returned to Little Creek, arriving there on 22 August 1965.

On 29 November 1965, Kirwin departed for the Caribbean to join Task Force 184 for amphibious warfare and antisubmarine exercises. She returned to Little Creek on 16 December 1965.

In 1966 Kirwin operated out of Little Creek on training exercises along the United States East Coast and in the Caribbean until heading for the Mediterranean on 15 August 1966. Arriving at Naval Station Rota at Rota, Spain, on 25 August 1966, she visited Italy, Malta, Greece, Tunisia, Spain, and Morocco before returning to Little Creek on 3 December 1966.

Decommissioned 16 December 1968 Orange, Texas.

Kirwin was reclassified as an "amphibious transport, small" and redesignated LPR-90 on 1 January 1969.

[History needed for 1969]

== Final decommissioning and disposal ==
Kirwin was decommissioned in 1969. She was stricken from the Naval Vessel Register on 15 September 1974 and sold for scrapping on 11 August 1975 to J. R. Steel, Inc., Houston, Texas, for $79,002 (USD).
