= John Whitworth =

John Whitworth may refer to:

- John Whitworth (RAF officer) (1912–1974), Royal Air Force pilot
- John Whitworth (musician) (1921–2013), English countertenor, organist, and teacher of music
- John Whitworth (poet) (1945–2019), British poet

== See also ==
- Johnny Whitworth (born 1975), American actor
