= Nangle =

Nangle is a surname. Notable people with the surname include:

- David Nangle (born 1960), American politician
- John Francis Nangle (1922–2008), American jurist
- Richard Nangle (bishop), Irish bishop
- Romello Nangle (born 1995), English football player
- Thomas Nangle (1889–1972), Canadian cleric, Rhodesian politician
- Edward Nangle (1799–1883), Missionary to Achill
