= Fitzwarren =

Fitzwarren may refer to:

- Fouke FitzWarren or Fulk FitzWarin (c. 1160–1258), English nobleman turned outlaw from Whittington Castle in Shropshire
- Norton Fitzwarren, village and civil parish in Somerset, England
  - Norton Fitzwarren rail crash (1890)
  - Norton Fitzwarren rail crash (1940)
  - Norton Fitzwarren railway station
- Stanton Fitzwarren, village and civil parish near Swindon, Wiltshire, England
- Fitzwarren, name of the merchant in the story of Dick Whittington and His Cat
