= William Whitworth =

William Whitworth may refer to:

- Sir William Whitworth (Royal Navy officer) (1884–1973)
- William Whitworth (journalist) (1937–2024), American journalist and editor
- William Whitworth (politician) (1813–1886), British cotton manufacturer and politician
- William Allen Whitworth (1840–1905), English mathematician and Church of England priest
- William Whitworth (archdeacon) (died 1804), Anglican priest
