= Brian Morrissey =

Canadian civil servant

John Brian Morrissey is a co-founder of the Canadian Food Inspection Agency.

Born in Dungarvan, Ireland, he graduated from University College Dublin with a degree in veterinary medicine and became a member of the Royal College of Veterinary Surgeons in 1965.

He immigrated to Canada in 1968, and joined the Food Production and Inspection Branch of Agriculture and Agri-Food Canada and held several positions including Director General of the Food Inspection Directorate, and Assistant Deputy Minister (ADM) of the Canadian Food Inspection Agency. Between 1990 and 1992, he served as ADM of the Science Branch at Fisheries and Oceans Canada and in 1992, he was appointed ADM of the Research Branch at Agriculture and Agri-Food Canada.

In 2001, he was awarded Canada's "Outstanding Achievement Award", and in 2004 was presented with the French Ministry of Agriculture's professional designation known as "Knight of the Order of Agricultural Merit" for advancing Franco-Canadian cooperation in research.
