= Leonard Filgate =

Leonard Filgate (born August 26, 1947) is an artist and illustrator, best known for the Rip Squeak children's books and merchandise he and his wife, author Susan Yost-Filgate, created in 1997.

== Biography ==
=== Early life and education ===
Leonard Filgate was born August 26, 1947, in San Francisco, California. At 16, he sold his first painting. After high school, he served in the United States Merchant Marine. In 1970, Filgate began a career as an artist and illustrator.

=== Career ===
Filgate is a self-taught artist and illustrator. Since 1970, he has created commissioned works for private individuals, projects for the US Navy, reproductions of Japanese screens, props for a Warner Bros. Television series, and theatrical backdrops. From 1997 to 2007, he created and illustrated Rip Squeak. Filgate has illustrated five children's books and two arts books, which have sold over 500,000 copies to date.

He has originals and prints are at the Delaware Art Museum in Wilmington, Delaware and the Good Samaritan Hospital in San Jose, California. He was the featured illustrator for the 2003 Los Angeles Times Festival of Books, has been included in the Simon Wiesenthal Museum of Tolerance "Every Picture Tells a Story" traveling exhibition, had a major solo exhibition in 2005/2006 at the Delaware Art Museum, and is an artist member of the Society of Illustrators in New York City.

=== Marriage and children ===
He married author Susan Yost in 1979; the couple have a daughter, born in 1984.
