= Charles Filgate =

Irish cricketer

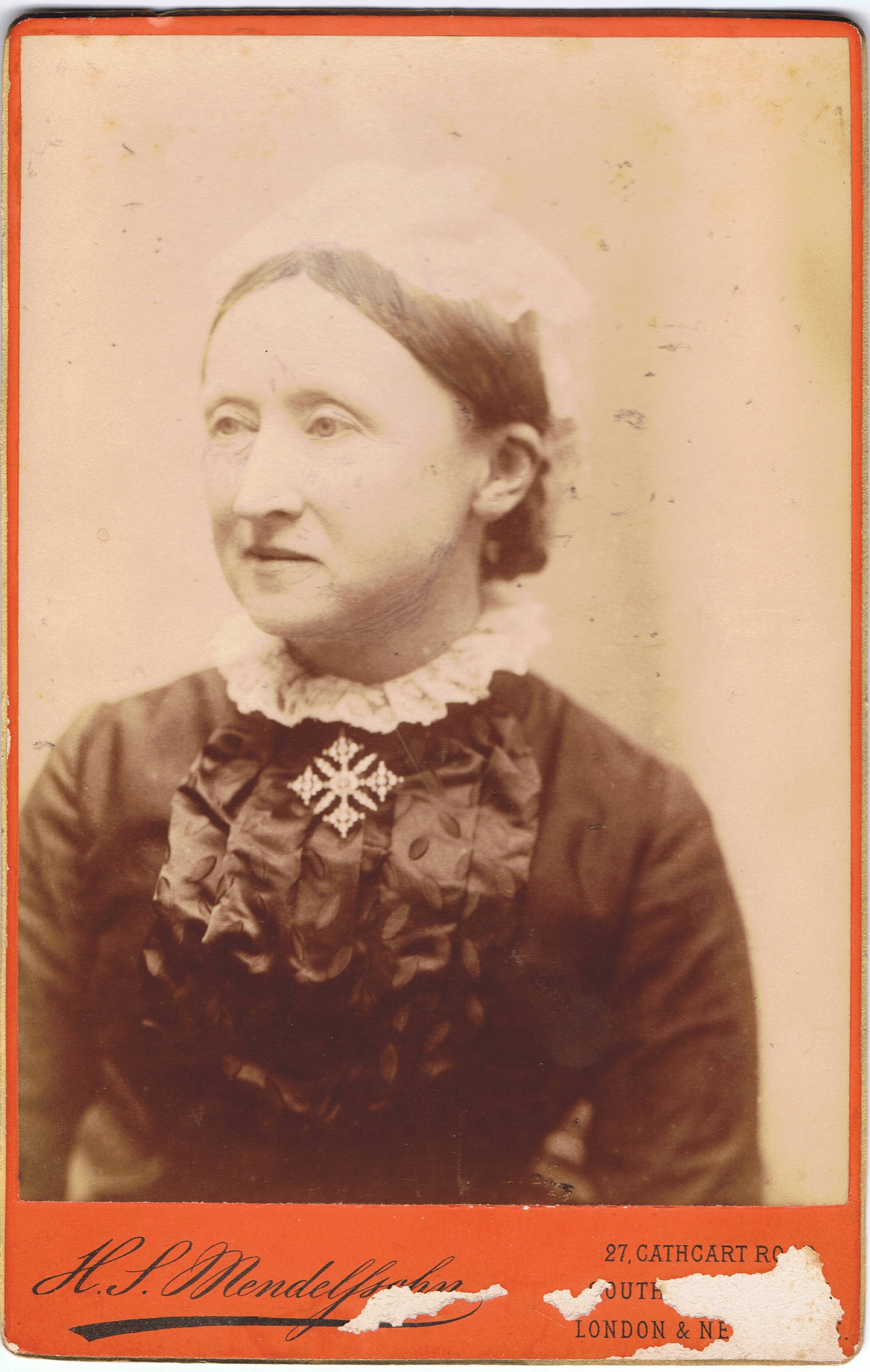

Personal information
- Full name: Charles Roden Filgate
- Born: 16 October 1849; Ardee, Ireland
- Died: 1 September 1930 (aged 80); Pinner, Middlesex, England
- Batting: Right-handed

Domestic team information
- Years: Team
- 1869–1873: Marylebone Cricket Club
- 1870–1877: Gloucestershire

Career statistics
Competition	First-class
Matches	25
Runs scored	563
Batting average	15.63
100s/50s	0/2
Top score	93
Catches/stumpings	18/–
- Source: Cricinfo, 28 October 2021

Charles Roden Filgate (16 October 1849 – 1 September 1930) was an Irish amateur cricketer who played first-class cricket from 1869 to 1877 for Gloucestershire and Marylebone Cricket Club (MCC), where he was a member. Filgate represented Ireland in three matches between 1868 and 1871. He was a right-handed batsman who made 25 first-class career appearances. He scored 563 runs with a highest score of 93 and held 18 catches.

Filgate was the sixth and youngest son of William Filgate of Lissrenny (1781–1875), J.P., by his wife Sophia Juliana Penelope (1807–1866), eldest daughter of the Count De Salis. He married Clare, daughter of William Cooper, on 27 February 1906. He was educated at Cheltenham College and the Inner Temple (1869). In 1872, he was called to the Bar and became a member of the Oxford Circuit. A practising Barrister-at-Law, he lived for some time at The Terrace, Matlock Bank, Derbyshire, England, and had two children:

- William Alexander Jerome Filgate (12 Apr 1908–)
- Margaret Penelope Filgate (21 Jan 1910–)

== Some of his family ==
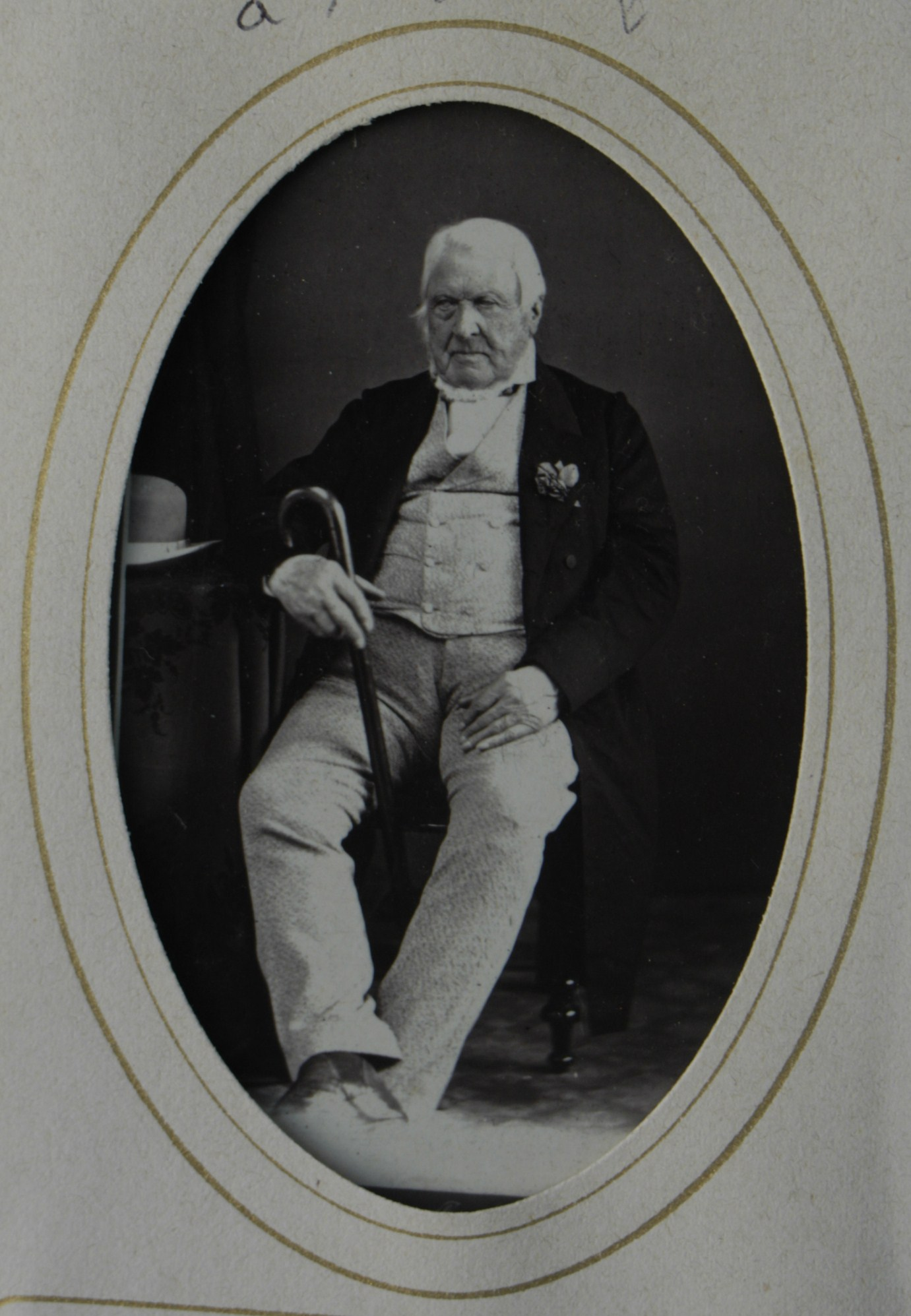
His father, William Filgate (1781–1875) of Lissrenny, JP counties Louth and Monaghan, High Sheriff County Louth, 1832, and Treasurer of the (Louth) Grand Jury, 1854–69

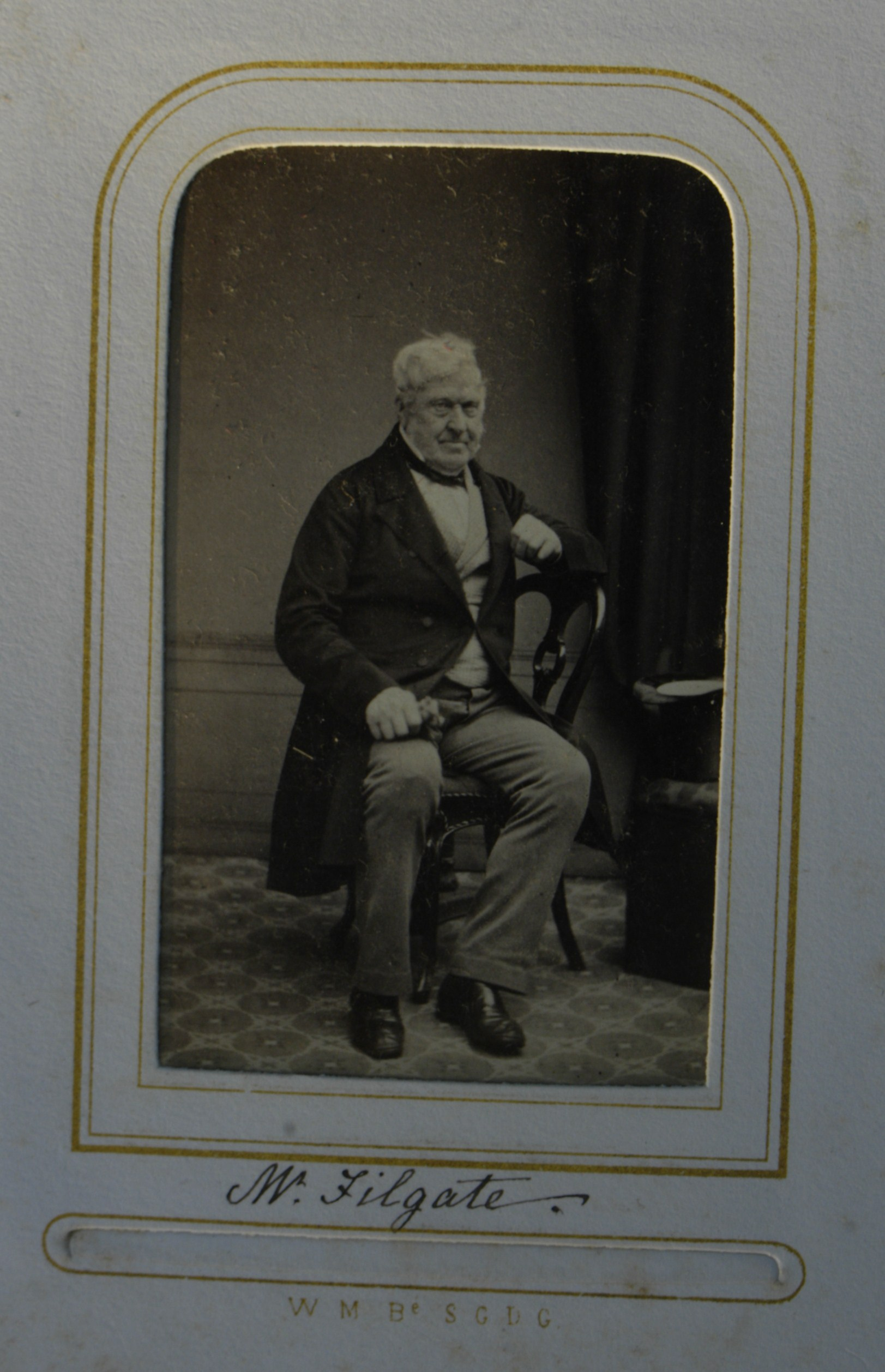
His father

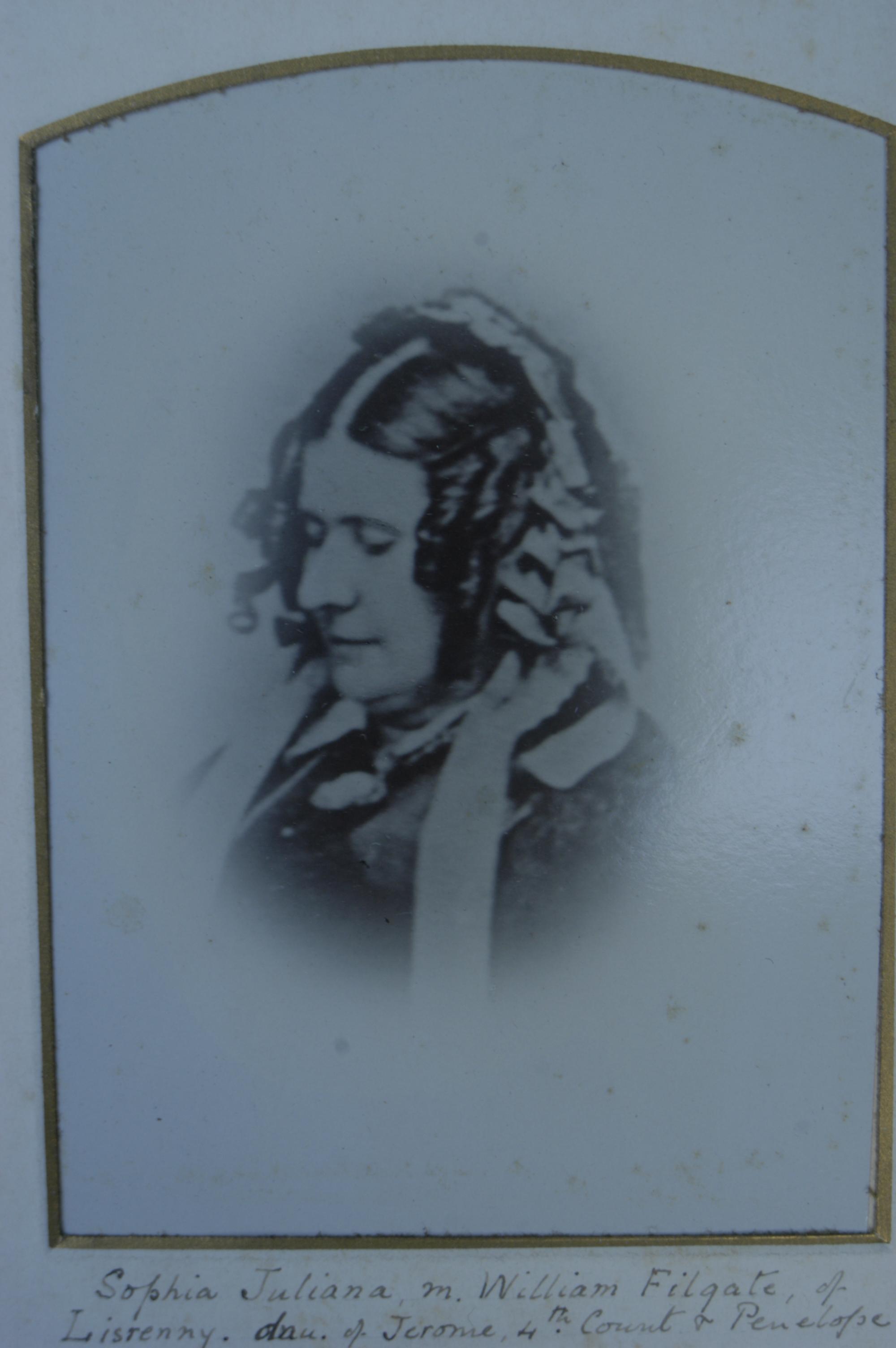
Mother

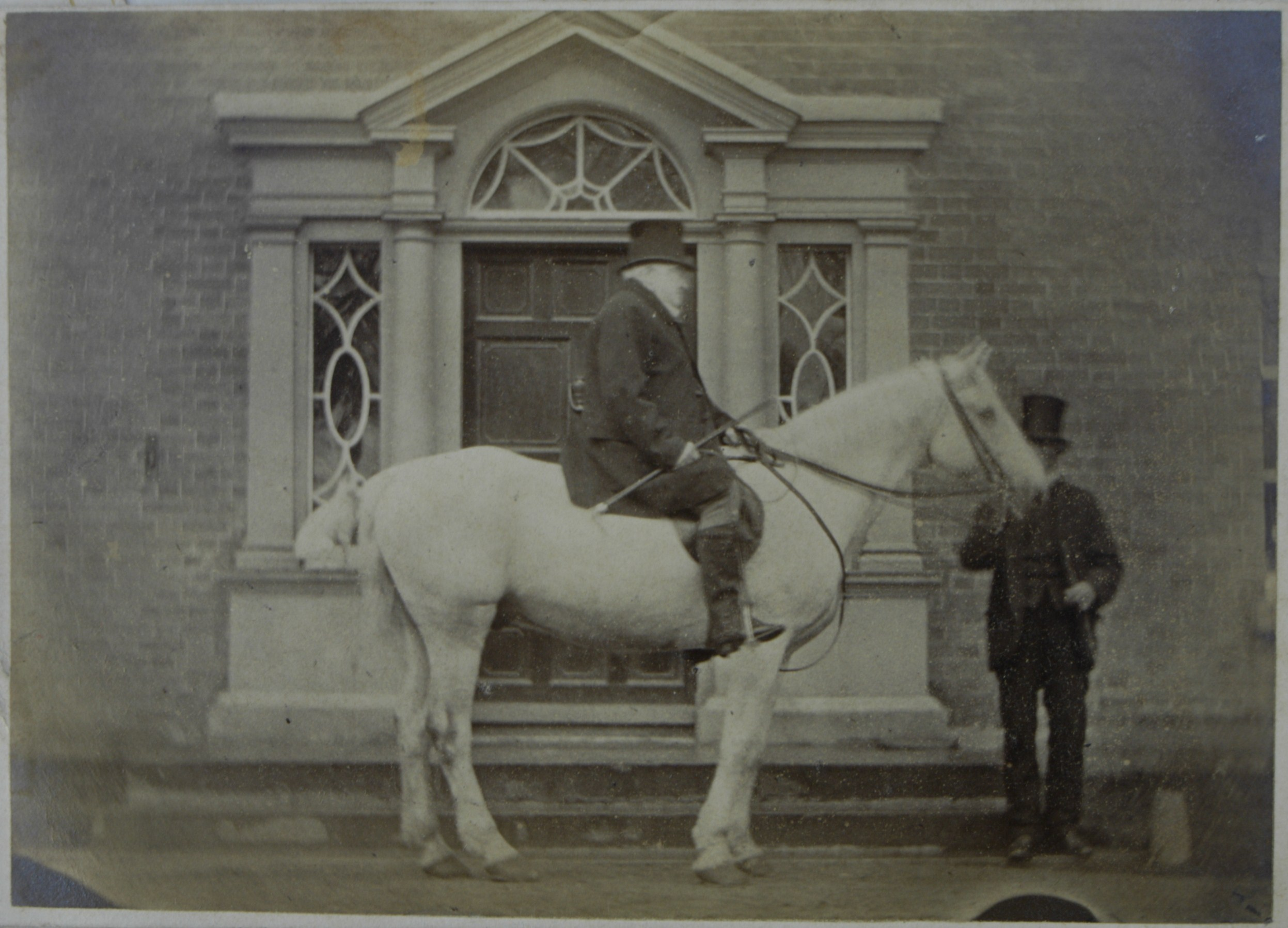
His father on a horse, Lissrenny, c. 1870

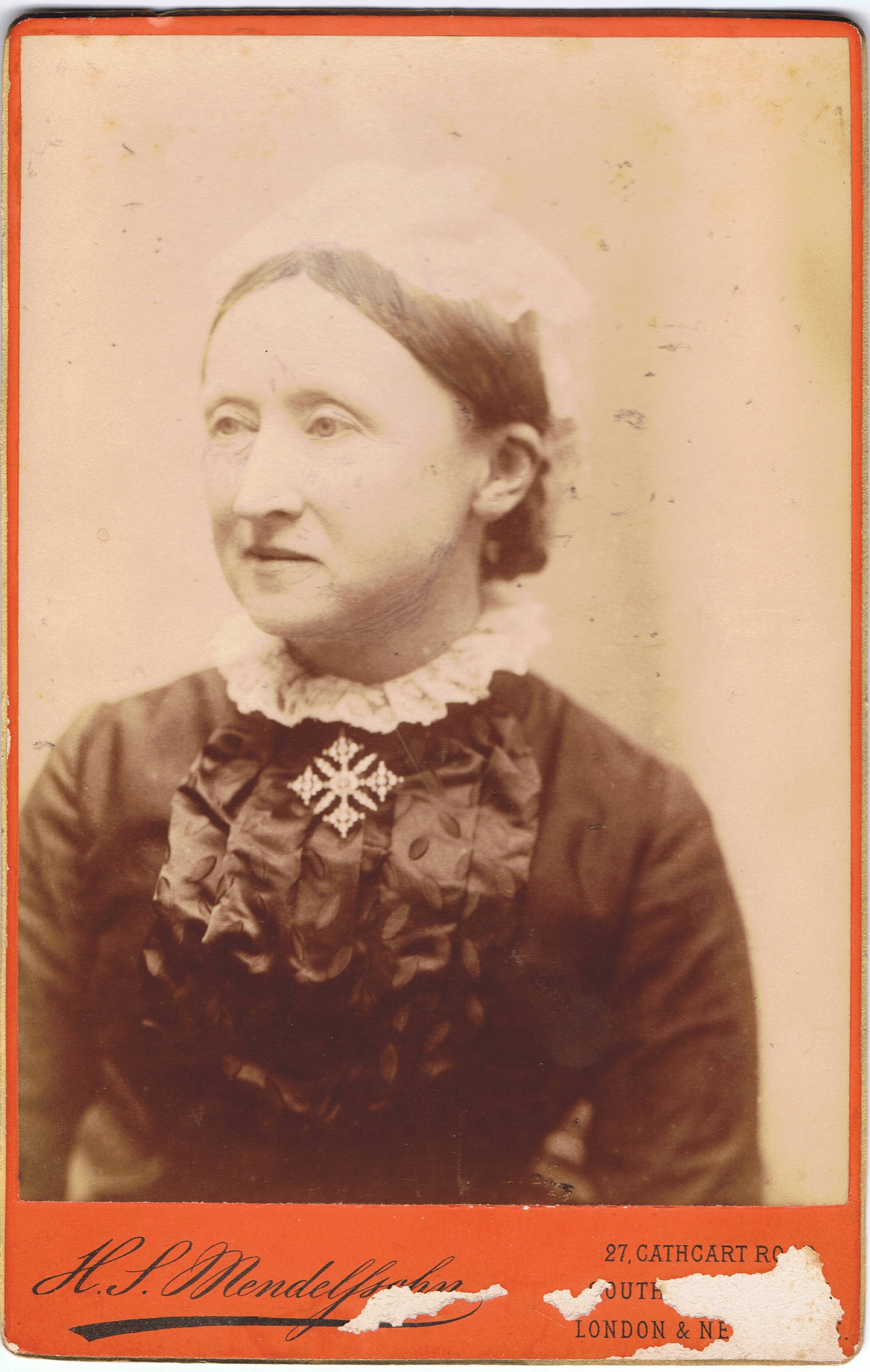
His sister, Anne Harriet Penelope Eleanor Filgate (1832–1917), married, 1857, Thomas William Filgate, JP, of Tullykeel (d. 1868)

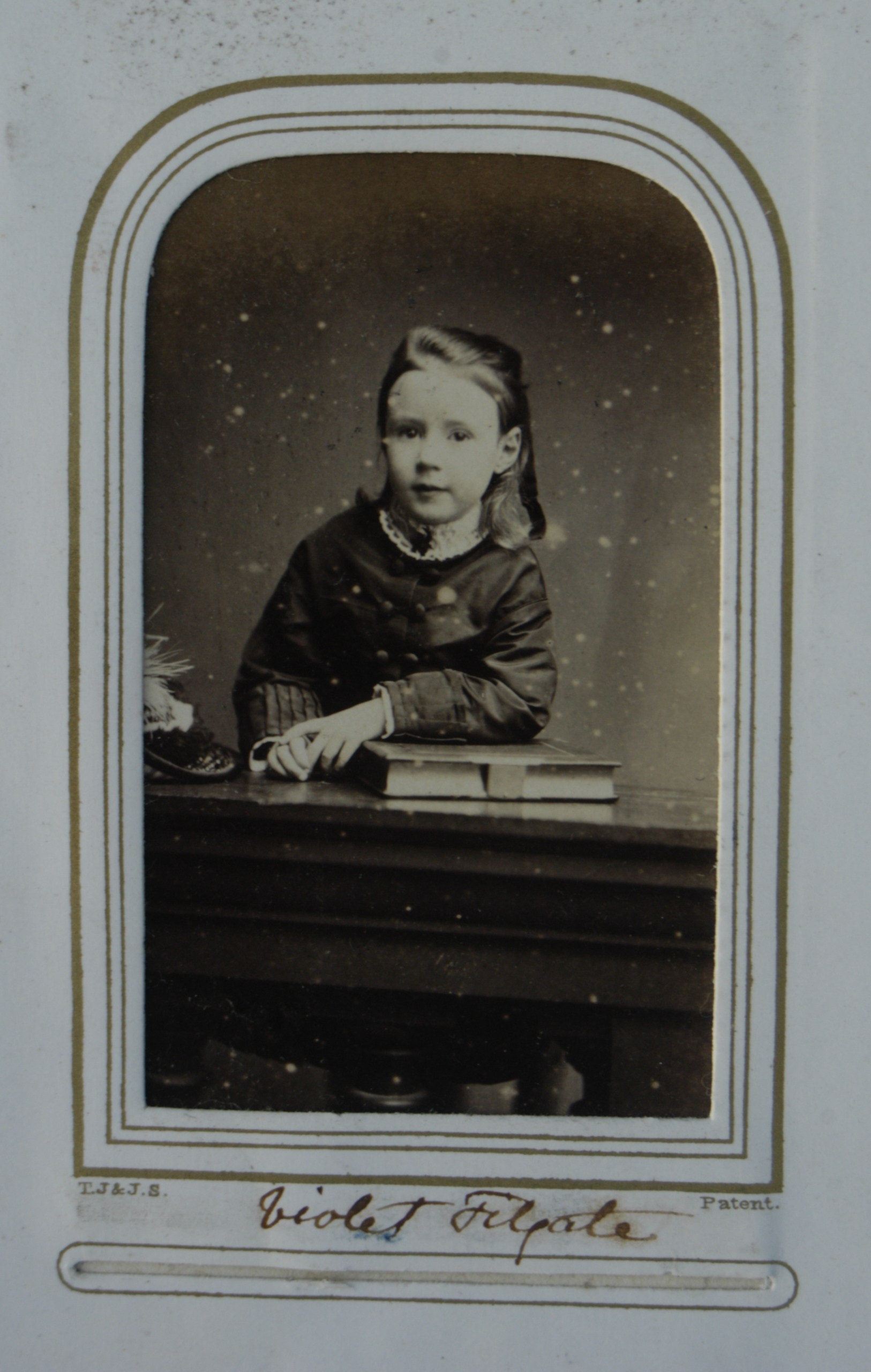
A niece: Violet Evelyn Sophia Filgate (1871–1912), elder daughter of William de Salis Filgate (1834–1916), MFH, of Lisrenny, Ardee
