= Freaney =

Freaney is a surname, and may refer to:

- Cyril Freaney, All-Ireland Gaelic football finalist in 1955
- Ollie Freaney, All-Ireland Gaelic football champion in 1958
