= Fitzwater =

Fitzwater is a patronymic surname of English origin, being a variant of Fitz Walter, 'son of Walter'. Notable people with the surname include:

- Jack Fitzwater (born 1997), English footballer
- Jessica Fitzwater, American politician
- Marlin Fitzwater (born 1942), press secretary for presidents Ronald Reagan and George H. W. Bush
- Paul Fitzwater (born 1959), Republican member of the Missouri House of Representatives
- Rodger Fitzwater (born 1962), Democrat member of the Missouri House of Representatives
- Sidney A. Fitzwater (born 1953), American jurist
- Travis Fitzwater (born 1981), Republican member of the Missouri House of Representatives
- Darryl Fitzwater, American Anglican bishop

== See also ==
- Fitzwater Wray (1869–1938), British cycling journalist
- Fitzwater Station, a restaurant and former stop along the Underground Railroad
- Thomas Fitzwater Elementary School, located in the Upper Dublin School District of Pennsylvania
