= Punch (surname) =

The surname Punch may refer to:

- Gary Punch (born 1957), Australian politician
- Jerry Punch (born 1953), American auto racing and college football commentator
- John Punch (slave) (fl. 1630s), supposedly the first official slave in the English colonies
- John Punch (theologian), 1603–1661), Irish Franciscan scholastic philosopher and theologian
- Leon Punch (1928–1991), Australian politician
- Lucy Punch (born 1977), English actress
- Sean Punch (born 1967), Canadian writer and game designer
