= William Morrissey (rugby union) =

Australian rugby union player

- Born: William Morrissey circa 1889 Brisbane, Queensland

Rugby union career
- Position: prop
International career
Years	Team	Apps	(Points)
1914	Wallabies	1	(0)

William Morrissey (born circa 1889) was a rugby union player who represented Australia.

Morrissey, a prop, was born in Brisbane, Queensland and claimed 1 international rugby cap for Australia.
