= Peppard =

Peppard may refer to:

- George Peppard (1928–1994), American film and television actor
- Mick Peppard (1877–1939), Australian rules footballer
- Peppard (Reading ward), a local government ward in the Borough of Reading, England
- Rotherfield Peppard, a village and civil parish in the county of Oxfordshire, England
