= Fitzsimon =

Fitzsimon is a surname. Notable people with the surname include:

- Henry Fitzsimon (c.1566–c.1643), Irish Jesuit controversialist
- Walter Fitzsimon (died 1511), Archbishop of Dublin and Lord Chancellor of Ireland

== See also ==
- Fitzsimons
