= Daniel Cantillon =

American fencer

Personal information
- Born: February 17, 1945 (age 81) Cleveland, Ohio, United States
- Height: 5 ft 11 in (180 cm)

Sport
- Sport: Fencing

Daniel Cantillon (born February 17, 1945) is an American former fencer. He competed in the team épée event at the 1968 Summer Olympics.
