= Dick Blanchfield =

Irish hurler (1939–2019)

Personal information
- Native name: Risteard de Bluinsín (Irish)
- Born: 28 September 1939 Lisdowney, County Kilkenny, Ireland
- Died: 20 July 2019 (aged 79) Lisdowney, County Kilkenny, Ireland

Sport
- Sport: Hurling
- Position: Left corner-forward
Club
- Years: Club
- Lisdowney
Club titles
- Kilkenny titles: 0
Inter-county
- Years: County
- 1967-1968: Kilkenny
Inter-county titles
- Leinster titles: 1
- All-Irelands: 1
- NHL: 0

Richard Blanchfield (28 September 1939 – 20 July 2019) was an Irish hurler. At club level he played with Lisdowney and also lined out at inter-county level with the Kilkenny senior hurling team.

== Career ==
Blanchfield first played hurling at club level with Lisdowney. He was part of the team that beat Knocktoper to win the Kilkenny JHC title in 1960 and gain senior status for the club. Blanchfield's performances at club level resulted in him joining the Kilkenny senior hurling team. He came on as a substitute for Eddie Keher when Kilkenny beat Tipperary in the 1967 All-Ireland final. Blanchfield was again introduced as a substitute when Kilkenny were beaten by Wexford in the following year's Leinster final.

== Death ==
Blanchfield died on 29 July 2019, at the age of 79.

== Honours ==
Lisdowney

- Kilkenny Junior Hurling Championship: 1969

Kilkenny

- All-Ireland Senior Hurling Championship: 1967
- Leinster Senior Hurling Championship: 1967
