= FitzJohn (name) =

FitzJohn was a bus manufacturer in Muskegon, Michigan, United States.

FitzJohn, Fitzjohn, Fitz-John, and Fitz John are surnames and sometimes a given name. Notable people with these names include:

== Medieval patronymic ==
- Children of John fitzRichard, one of William the Conqueror's supporters; including:
  - Pain fitzJohn (died 1137)
  - Eustace fitz John (died 1157)
- Roger FitzJohn (died 1248/1249), Lord of Clavering, Warkworth and Horsford; son of John FitzRobert and Ada de Baillol
- Children of John Fitzgeoffrey (1205?–1258) Lord of Shere and Justiciar of Ireland; including:
  - John FitzJohn of Shere (died 1275)
  - Richard FitzJohn of Shere (died 1297)
  - Maud FitzJohn, Countess of Warwick (died 1301)
- William FitzJohn (died 1326), Archbishop of Cashel and Lord Chancellor of Ireland
- Thomas FitzJohn (died 1328), 2nd Earl of Kildare, Lord Offaly
- The 1st, 7th, and 9th Knight of Kerry
- John Fitz-John, Archdeacon of Totnes
- Walter Blake fitz John (died 1508), Bishop of Clonmacnoise, Ireland
- Dominick Lynch fitz John, Mayor (1548–9) of Galway, Ireland

== Given name ==
- Fitz John Porter (1822–1901), United States Army officer and a Union general during the American Civil War
- Fitz-John Winthrop (1637–1707), governor of the Colony of Connecticut

== Surname ==
- Gavin Fitzjohn, member of Welsh band Adequate Seven
- Tony Fitzjohn (1945–2022), British conservationist in Africa
- Val Fitzjohn (1878–1934), Scottish professional golfer
- William Henry Fitzjohn (1915–1989), Sierra Leonean churchman, educator and diploma
