= Gordon Aylward =

Australian chemical author

Gordon Hillis Aylward is an Australian chemical author. He is known for writing the SI Chemical Data book.

== Biography ==
Aylward graduated on 20 May 1952 with a BSc (Honours) in Applied Chemistry from the then-new University of New South Wales in Sydney, Australia. Later he received a MSc from the same university, and continued to teach Analytical Chemistry for 13 years there. During that period he organized the Approach to Chemistry summer schools, together with his co-teacher Dr Tristan Findlay. To support the course, they wrote the book SI Chemical Data as the textbook.

Later Aylward joined Macquarie University as Associate Professor and worked from 1970 till his retirement in 2005 in developing countries as a Science Education consultant for UNESCO, then for the World Bank and finally as a freelance Senior Science Education Advisor.

== Published works ==
- Aylward, G. H.; T. J. V. Findlay (1965). SI Chemical Data (1st ed.). Milton, Queensland: John Wiley & Sons Australia. Now in its 6th edition.
