= Supple =

Supple is a surname. Notable people with the surname include:

- Barry Supple (born 1930), English academic
- Danton Supple (born 1965), British record producer
- John Supple (c. 1810–1869), Canadian businessman
- Shane Supple (born 1987), Irish footballer
- Tim Supple (born 1962), English theatre director

== See also ==
- Violet Cliff (née Supple) (1916–2003), British skater
- Flexibility (disambiguation)
