= Richard T. Cooney =

American businessman and politician (1933-2014)

Richard T. Cooney (October 25, 1933 – November 27, 2014) was an American businessman and politician.

Born in Cranston, Rhode Island, Cooney served in the United States Army. He then received his bachelor's degree from University of Rhode Island and his masters from Northwestern University. He worked for Bell Laboratories and lived in Salem, New Hampshire. He served in the New Hampshire House of Representatives, from 1996 to 2006, and was a Republican. He died in Salem, New Hampshire.
