= Fitzhenry =

Origin
- Meaning: "son of Henry"
- Region of origin: Ireland

Other names
- Variant form: Henry

Fitzhenry is an Irish Hiberno-Norman surname. It is patronymic as the prefix Fitz- derives from the Latin filius, meaning "son of". Its variants include the alternate forms "Fitz-Henry", FitzHenry and ‘’Fitz Henry’’, and the given name turned surname Henry. Another Irish variant is Fitzharris, and the surnames were often used interchangeably within the same family. Fitzhenry is rare as a given name, but may indicate that the person was descended from a female Fitz(-)henry, or that the person's father had Henry as a first forename. Fitzhenrys in Ireland are predominantly found in County Wexford and County Galway.

== People ==
People with the name Fitzhenry include:

As a given name

- Fitz Henry Lane (1804–1865), born Nathaniel Rogers Lane, also known as Fitz Hugh Lane, American painter and printmaker
- Fitz Henry Warren (1816–1878), politician and American Civil War general

Surname

- Bill Fitz Henry (1903–1957), Australian journalist
- Damien Fitzhenry (born 1974), Irish hurling and Gaelic football player
- Daniel Fitzhenry (born 1979), Australian rugby league footballer
- Elizabeth Fitzhenry (died 1790?), aka Mrs. Fitzhenry, Irish actress
- Louis Fitzhenry (1870–1935), Illinois politician and United States federal judge.
- Meiler Fitzhenry (died 1220), Irish nobleman and Lord Chief Justice of Ireland

== Others ==
- Fitzhenry & Whiteside, a Canadian book publishing company

== See also ==
- Fitz
- Henry (disambiguation)
