= Tim Cooney =

Tim Cooney may refer to:

- Tim Cooney (sound engineer) (born 1951), American production sound mixer
- Tim Cooney (baseball) (born 1990), American baseball player
