= Laffan =

- Language: Latin, Norman French, Irish Gaelic

Origin
- Region of origin: Ireland, Normandy

Other names
- Variant form: Laffin

Laffan is an Irish surname of Norman origin. The name is found most commonly in counties Tipperary and Wexford. Laffan in the Irish language is Lafán or Ó Laimhín

The historic seats of the Laffan family are Slade Castle on the Hook peninsula in County Wexford and Graystown Castle near Killenaule in County Tipperary.

== People with the name ==
- Brigid Laffan (fl. 1977– ), Irish political scientist
- Gary Laffan (born 1975), Irish hurler
- Joseph de Courcy Laffan (1786–1848), Irish physician
- Kevin Laffan (1922–2003), English playwright
- May Laffan (1845–1916), writer, a pioneer of "slum fiction" in Ireland
- Patricia Laffan (1919–2014), English actress
- Robert Laffan (c.1794–1833), Archbishop of Cashal and Emly in Ireland
- Robert Laffan (politician) (1821–1882), officer in the Royal Engineers, Governor of Bermuda
- William M. Laffan (1848–1909), publisher and editor of the New York Sun

== See also ==
- 16085 Laffan, a main-belt asteroid
