= R. P. Whitworth =

(1831–1901) journalist and author

Robert Percy Whitworth (1831 – 31 March 1901) was a journalist, writer, and editor who was active in Australia and New Zealand.

== Life ==
Whitworth was born in England, the son of John Whitworth and his wife Ann, née Dawson. He was born in Manchester, Lancashire in 1832, and was baptised in Manchester Cathedral on 15 July 1832. However, a contemporary biography says he was born in 1831 and one modern biography suggests this was in Torquay, Devon.

He grew up in England "principally in Lancashire and Cheshire." At nineteen he was an apprentice teacher in Manchester but decided instead to translate his interest in literature to life on the stage.

=== Australia ===
Emigrating to Sydney in 1855, he worked briefly in the city as an actor but by 1857 had resorted to better paid work up north, horse breaking in the Hunter River Valley. His literary career commenced on his return to Sydney when he found work as a journalist for The Empire. Possibly suffering from the loss of his seven month old daughter in April 1858, he gave this up and two months later was advertising himself in local newspapers as a riding master which by 1860 proclaimed to be "under the patronage of his Excellency the Governor-General."

He returned to writing by chance, forced to stop riding "owing to a severe fall," which kicked off a long and prolific - not to mention distinctly nomadic - career as a journalist, author and playwright.

He wrote for various major newspapers in Sydney including a return to The Empire, until the death of his first son in March 1863 appears to have been the catalyst for another upheaval. The family moved to Brisbane, Queensland where Robert did not have fixed employment but "between free lancing and acting on the stage, he eked out a precarious Bohemian living." His determination to act went so far as to set up the Brisbane Theatre Company, enlisting two aldermen amongst the directors and acting as secretary from its first call for shareholders in September 1863.

Discovering for the second time that acting could not support him, a commission from F. F. Bailliere took him just a few months later to Melbourne, Victoria. He produced his first significant reference work there, the intensely researched and commercially successful 1865 Victorian Gazetteer. When The Argus eventually offered him steady work reporting on parliamentary proceedings, he would later settle in Melbourne. His varied work there covered journalism for The Age, The Telegraph, Town Talk (which he owned for a while), contributing pieces to various magazines including Sydney Punch, contributing to books such as the 1888 book Victoria and its Metropolis, Past and Present, vol. II: The Colony and its People, and a large volume of work published in his own name.

Before settling, however, there followed a period of extreme travel as he compiled successive gazetteers of two more Australian colonies: New South Wales in 1866 (where his second son was born in February of that year), and South Australia (where he lived in North Adelaide and his son was belatedly christened in September 1866). There followed a four-year residence in New Zealand (see below) before he returned to Melbourne.

His colleague at The Argus, Marcus Clarke, was a member of the Melbourne bohemian literary circle of the time, and they became close friends - Robert also came to be great friends with Adam Lindsay Gordon through this circle.

Whitworth and Clarke collaborated on several projects including Clarke's A history of the continent of Australia and the Island of Tasmania, often referred to as "A History of Australia", (Note: Not to be confused with Manning Clark's A History of Australia, published in six volumes a century later.) which was used as a school textbook for many years. It has been contended that Whitworth was really the author, giving Clarke the editing credit as a deliberate act of generosity, being a "good and generous friend" as Marcus was a sub-librarian at the public library in Melbourne at the time, angling for the top job of librarian, but unlike Robert had no credits to his name in editing or non-fiction. In the event, it did not help: Marcus was passed over for promotion on the incumbent's death in 1880, and his subsequent neglect of his work, health and finances lead to illness and bankruptcy. Robert was a pallbearer at Marcus' funeral the following year.

Robert's work spanned a remarkable variety of fiction and non-fiction: from stock market to gossip journalism, gazetteers of the colonies, city guidebooks, a monograph on the Eureka Stockade, poetry, short stories, serialised stories, novels, a handful of plays, and even a cantata.

Though rarely credited for it, Robert Whitworth was also a decent but modest artist: he contributed sketches for illustrations in newspapers and books.

=== New Zealand ===
Whitworth had already shown an interest in Maori culture. From around 1868 to 1874 Whitworth worked as a journalist for the Otago Daily Times and while in Otago, he was involved in moves to settle Martins Bay. His younger son was born in its principal city, Dunedin, and his middle name (which became the surname of his stage persona) reflects the name of the Hollyford River.

Back in Australia he was active in promoting tourist excursions to New Zealand.

=== Selected works ===
==== Reference books ====
He produced a gazetteer of each Australian colony (excepting Western Australia), produced by F. F. Bailliere, Government Printer, of 104 Collins Street east:

- Baillière's Victorian Gazetteer (1865)
- Baillière's N. S. Wales Gazetteer (1866)
- Baillière's South Australian Gazetteer (1866)
- Baillière's Queensland Gazetteer (1876)
- Baillière's Tasmanian Gazetteer (1877)

==== Short stories ====
Many of his short stories were published individually and later in collections.

- Spangles and Sawdust (1872)
- Round the Camp Fire (1872)
- Under the Dray (1872)
- Cobb's Box (1874)

==== Novels ====
- Lost and Found (1874) recounting the loss of the General Grant on the Auckland Islands
- Hine-ra, or, The Maori Scout (1887)
- Uncle John published in serial form in several newspapers.
- Lost and Found — A Romance of the Desolate Region published in serial form in several newspapers.

==== Drama ====
- Whakeau, the Pakeha Chief was played in July 1862 at the Lyceum, with scenery painted by W. J. Wilson. It played in September of that year at the Princess's Theatre, Melbourne
- Rangatira Wahena, or, The Maori Queen, concerning a shipwreck survivor "Edward Dawson" who falls in with a Maori village, was played in the week following Whakeau at both venues. Both plays were supported by Maori performers brought to Australia by Dr McGauran.
- Maximilian, or, The Princess and the Traitor, written for Madame Celeste as Princess Charlotte.
- The Happy Land, a political farce adapted for the stage in 1880 in collaboration with his friend Marcus Clark
- Reverses, a comedy of manners written in collaboration with Marcus Clark (never performed)
- Catching a Conspirator was a "pronounced success" and possibly alone in that respect. It featured a character, "Varry Sillivain", a transparent reference to Barry Sullivan, notably played by H. R. Harwood, and relied for its humor on Harwood's skill at mimicking the great actor.

==== Other ====
- He wrote the occasional poem.
- He wrote the libretto to Under the Holly, a cantata by J. C. Fisher, sung by the Sydney Harmonic Society before the Duke of Edinburgh at the Prince of Wales Opera House, Sydney, on 22 February 1868.
- He was for a time associated in society journalism with Garnet Walch and John Conway.

=== Later years ===
In old age he suffered for "some years" from a mystery "lingering illness" which in the later stages included the paralysis which lead to his death. His remains were interred at the Melbourne General Cemetery.

== Family ==
Whitworth married Margaret Rivers Smith on 9 September 1854, prior to leaving for Australia. They had at least half a dozen children, of which only the youngest three, one daughter and two sons, reached adulthood. Their family included:

- Alma Whitworth (c. 1855 – 22 August 1873) born in Manchester, their only child born in England. Died in Carlton, Victoria.
- Mary Beatrice Whitworth (19 Sep 1857 – 29 Apr 1858) born in West Maitland, New South Wales, died in Sydney, New South Wales
- John P. Whitworth (1 Feb 1863 – 29 Mar 1863) born in Sydney, New South Wales, died age 1 month in Paddington, New South Wales
- Francis "Frank" Whitworth (1 February 1866 – ) worked as advance agent for his brother's Dan Barry Dramatic Company.
- Robert Hollyford Whitworth (1870 – 10 June 1934) was born in Dunedin; married first to Laura Jane Hanlon on 21 July 1906; they divorced in 1919. He married secondly Marie Constance "Myra" Woodland (c. 1896 – ) on 12 October 1919. He married thirdly, to Jean. Known professionally as Robert Hollyford, he was an actor and theatre producer.
- Emmeline Margaret Whitworth (1872 – 1945) married John Patrick Joyce on 5 August 1902 and lived in Western Australia

They had a home at 5 Gladstone Street, Windsor, Victoria.
