= List of shipwrecks in 1966 =

The list of shipwrecks in 1966 includes ships sunk, foundered, grounded, or otherwise lost during 1966.

table of contents
1966
Jan	Feb	Mar	Apr
May	Jun	Jul	Aug
Sep	Oct	Nov	Dec
Unknown date

== January ==
=== 2 January ===
List of shipwrecks: 2 January 1966
Ship	State	Description
Pytheas	Greece	The Liberty ship sprang a leak and was beached at Rhodes, a total loss.

=== 4 January ===
List of shipwrecks: 4 January 1966
Ship	State	Description
Faro	Liberia	The Liberty ship was driven ashore near Tokyo, Japan (34°53′N 139°55′E) in a cyclone. Declared a constructive total loss, she was scrapped in situ.

=== 6 January ===
List of shipwrecks: 6 January 1966
Ship	State	Description
Polynesia	United States	The schooner ran aground on a reef 15 nautical miles (28 km) south of Bimini, Bahamas. Fourteen of the 47 people on board were rescued by a United States Coast Guard helicopter.

=== 10 January ===
List of shipwrecks: 10 January 1966
Ship	State	Description
Monte Palomares	Spain	The cargo ship sank in the Atlantic Ocean 840 nautical miles (1,560 km; 970 mi) northeast of Bermuda with the loss of 32 of her 38 crew.

=== 11 January ===
List of shipwrecks: 11 January 1966
Ship	State	Description
Lampsis	Greece	The Liberty ship sprang a leak in the Atlantic Ocean. She was on a voyage from Casablanca, Morocco to Philadelphia, Pennsylvania, United States. She foundered the next day 600 nautical miles (1,100 km) north east of Bermuda (34°18′N 51°22′W).

=== 14 January ===
List of shipwrecks: 14 January 1966
Ship	State	Description
Le Trégor	France	The coaster sank 5 nautical miles (9.3 km) of Cap Gris Nez following a collision with an unnamed motor vessel.

=== 18 January ===
List of shipwrecks: 18 January 1966
Ship	State	Description
"Wyre Conqueror"	United Kingdom	The 136-foot (41 m) fishing vessel grounded at Myrdalsansd, Iceland in a snowstorm. She was pulled off undamaged on 23 January by gunboat ICGV Óðinn (Iceland).

=== 20 January ===
List of shipwrecks: 20 January 1966
Ship	State	Description
Bright Star	Panama	The coaster ran aground in the South China Sea 50 nautical miles (93 km) south of Da Nang, South Vietnam (15°32′N 109°09′E) and was wrecked.
Kremsertor	West Germany	The cargo ship foundered in heavy weather off Plymouth, Devon, United Kingdom. All crew 27 rescued by the tug Atlantic (West Germany) or by a helicopter from 845 Naval Air Squadron based at RNAS Culdrose, Cornwall.
Mi Amigo	Netherlands	The coaster ran aground off Frinton-on-Sea, Essex, United Kingdom. Later refloated and returned to service.

=== 21 January ===
List of shipwrecks: 21 January 1966
Ship	State	Description
Viking Liberty	Greece	The Liberty ship ran aground at Trinidad. She was refloated, but declared a constructive total loss and scrapped.

=== 22 January ===
List of shipwrecks: 22 January 1966
Ship	State	Description
Praia do Saude	Portugal	The cargo ship ran aground in the southern Algarve. All six crew escaped alive.

=== 23 January ===
List of shipwrecks: 23 January 1966
Ship	State	Description
Chelwood Beacon	United Kingdom	The tanker ran aground in New York Bay, 1.5 nautical miles (2.8 km) east of Sandy Hook, New Jersey, United States. Thirty-nine crew taken off by the pilot boat New Jersey (United States). Thirteen crew and a pilot taken off the next day by USCGC Yeaton ( United States Coast Guard). The ship was later refloated, repaired and returned to service.

=== Unknown date ===
List of shipwrecks: 23 January 1966
Ship	State	Description
Kapetan Kostis	Greece	The cargo ship ran aground on the coast of Yugoslavia (45°12′N 14°16′E). She was on a voyage from Rijeka, Yugoslavia to Gibraltar. She was refloated and towed back to Rijeka. Consequently scrapped.

== February ==
=== 1 February ===
List of shipwrecks: 1 February 1966
Ship	State	Description
Rockport	Liberia	The Liberty ship was abandoned in the Pacific Ocean (32°59′N 168°10′W) after her hull fractured. She foundered on 5 February.
Unidentified submarine chaser	Vietnam People's Navy	Vietnam War: The T-25-class submarine chaser was sunk by U. S. aircraft.

=== 7 February ===
List of shipwrecks: 7 February 1966
Ship	State	Description
Kyra Hariklia	Panama	The cargo ship ran aground off Malmö, Sweden. She was on a voyage from Cuba to Malmö. She was refloated on 11 February but declared uneconomic to repair and consequently scrapped.

=== 10 February ===
List of shipwrecks: 10 February 1966
Ship	State	Description
Padre Island	Panama	The T2 tanker ran aground 5 nautical miles (9.3 km) of the Great Isaac Lighthouse, Bahamas (25°59′N 79°08′W) and was abandoned by her crew. She was on a voyage from Emden, West Germany to Pascagoula, Mississippi, United States. She was refloated on 22 February and towed to Jacksonville, Florida, United States. Declared uneconomic to repair, she was consequently scrapped.

=== 16 February ===
List of shipwrecks: 16 February 1966
Ship	State	Description
Funabashi, and White Mountain	United Kingdom; Liberia	The Liberty ship White Mountain collided with the cargo ship Funabashi 9 nautical miles (17 km) off Singapore (1°19′N 104°18′E). She capsized and sank. Funabashi was beached on Pulau Ramunia Island (1°22′N 104°15′E). She was refloated on 22 February but was consequently scrapped

=== 20 February ===
List of shipwrecks: 20 February 1966
Ship	State	Description
Anne Mildred Brovig	Norway	The tanker was involved in a collision off Heligoland, West Germany, with the coaster Pentland (United Kingdom). Both ships caught fire.

=== 20 February ===
List of shipwrecks: 20 February 1966
Ship	State	Description
Rexton Kent	Canada	The cargo ship, a converted Flower-class corvette, was scuttled off Cape Spencer, Nova Scotia.

=== 25 February ===
List of shipwrecks: 25 February 1966
Ship	State	Description
Ariete	Spanish Navy	The destroyer was wrecked on the coast of Galicia in Spain.
Marine Bounty	United Kingdom	The Liberty ship ran aground at Hasieshan, China (25°20′N 119°45′E). She was on a voyage from Chingwangtao, China to Singapore. She was refloated but ran aground again and broke in two. She was a total loss.
Sun Beam	United States	During a voyage from Ketchikan in Southeast Alaska to Kodiak on Kodiak Island with five men, one woman, and a cargo of lumber on board, the 194-gross register ton, 89.4-foot (27.2 m) fishing vessel disappeared without trace in a storm in the Gulf of Alaska.

=== 27 February ===
List of shipwrecks: 27 February 1966
Ship	State	Description
Euxeinos	Greece	The Liberty ship sprang a leak and was abandoned off the Azores (33°05′N 31°00′W). Presumed subsequently foundered.

=== 28 February ===
List of shipwrecks: 28 February 1966
Ship	State	Description
World Tempest	Liberia	The T2 tanker exploded and was damaged at La Spezia, Italy. Her tanks were being cleaned before scrapping.

=== Unknown date ===
List of shipwrecks: Unknown date in February 1966
Ship	State	Description
Kyra Hariklia	Greece	The cargo ship ran aground at Malmö, Sweden. Refloated on 11 February, declared a constructive total loss.

== March ==
=== 2 March ===
List of shipwrecks: 2 March 1966
Ship	State	Description
Anne II	United States	The 17-gross register ton, 41.1-foot (12.5 m) fishing vessel sank at Snettisham, Alaska.

=== 4 March ===
List of shipwrecks: 4 March 1966
Ship	State	Description
Sand Star	United Kingdom	The dredger collided with Caroline M (United Kingdom) in Southampton Water and sank. All eight crew rescued by Caroline M.

=== 11 March ===
List of shipwrecks: 11 March 1966
Ship	State	Description
Evi	Greece	The cargo ship ran aground and was wrecked in the Red Sea near Jeddah, Saudi Arabia.

=== 12 March ===
List of shipwrecks: 12 March 1966
Ship	State	Description
Lambda 2	Cuba	The fishing vessel was sunk by a Cuban exile-operated speedboat.
Lambda 17	Cuba	The fishing vessel was sunk by a Cuban exile-operated speedboat.

=== 16 March ===
List of shipwrecks: 16 March 1966
Ship	State	Description
Kettara IV	Panama	Vietnam War: The small 1910 coaster (original launched as Canonbar) was sunk by gunfire by North Vietnamese Army artillery off the Vietnamese Demilitarized Zone with the loss of her entire crew.

=== 18 March ===
List of shipwrecks: 18 March 1966
Ship	State	Description
Maria Despina	Liberia	The Liberty ship ran aground at Alexandria, Egypt and broke in two. The bow section was salvaged and subsequently used as a derrick barge.

=== 23 March ===
List of shipwrecks: 23 March 1966
Ship	State	Description
Pegasus	Netherlands	The coaster sank in the Tagus at Lisbon, Portugal following a collision with Transsylvania (West Germany). All crew rescued.

== April ==
=== 3 April ===
List of shipwrecks: 3 April 1966
Ship	State	Description
Anzio	United Kingdom	The passenger ship ran aground at Donna Nook, Lincolnshire and capsized, killing at least thirteen people.

=== 8 April ===
List of shipwrecks: 8 April 1966
Ship	State	Description
Oriente	Cuba	The cargo ship collided with Stavfjord (Norway) 16 nautical miles (30 km) north of Ameland, Netherlands. Both ships sank, all crew rescued by Luden (Netherlands).
Stavfjord	Norway	The cargo ship collided with Oriente (Cuba) 16 nautical miles (30 km) north of Ameland, Netherlands. Both ships sank, all crew rescued by Luden (Netherlands).
Viking Princess	Norway	The cruise ship caught fire off the coast of Cuba with the loss of five lives. As many as four people were reported missing. The 490 survivors were rescued by the cargo ship Cap Norte (West Germany), the tanker Navigator (Liberia) and the Victory ship Chungking Victory (Taiwan).

=== 12 April ===
List of shipwrecks: 12 April 1966
Ship	State	Description
Sparta	Netherlands	The coaster ran aground at Berwick-on-Tweed, Northumberland. Refloated with slight damage on 17 April.

=== 13 April ===
List of shipwrecks: 13 April 1966
Ship	State	Description
Omonia H.	Panama	The Ocean ship caught fire at Amsterdam, Netherlands. Consequently scrapped.
Sophia	United Kingdom	The cargo ship caught fire at Piraeus, Greece and was beached at Ambeliki. Refloated on 25 April, she was declared a constructive total loss but was sold, repaired and returned to service at Yannis for Greek owners.

=== 14 April ===
List of shipwrecks: 14 April 1966
Ship	State	Description
Sofoclis Venizelos	Greece	The cargo ship suffered a fire at Piraeus, Greece, and was wrecked.

=== 19 April ===
List of shipwrecks: 19 April 1966
Ship	State	Description
Pericles	Greece	The Liberty ship ran aground on the Ajax Reef (25°25′N 80°07′W). Declared a constructive total loss, she was consequently scrapped.

=== 21 April ===
List of shipwrecks: 21 April 1966
Ship	State	Description
Costance	Panama	The cargo ship ran aground on Lampedusa Island in the Mediterranean Sea and sank.
USS Lewis	United States Navy	The decommissioned John C. Butler-class destroyer escort was sunk as a target.
Saba	Netherlands	The coaster sank between the Isles of Scilly and Penzance, Cornwall after her cargo shifted. All seven crew rescued by Scillonian (United Kingdom).
USS Walter B. Cobb	United States Navy	The decommissioned Crosley-class high-speed transport sank in the Pacific Ocean after colliding with the decommissioned high-speed transport USS Gantner (United States Navy) while both ships were under tow.

=== 26 April ===
List of shipwrecks: 26 April 1966
Ship	State	Description
Corrine	United States	The 22-gross register ton, 39.5-foot (12.0 m) fishing vessel sank off Craig, Alaska.

=== 26 April ===
List of shipwrecks: 26 April 1966
Ship	State	Description
Heinz Bernd	West Germany	The coaster collided with the motor vessel Torne (Sweden) in the Kattegat and sank with the loss of six lives.

== May ==
=== 7 May ===
List of shipwrecks: 7 May 1966
Ship	State	Description
HDMS Skarven	Royal Danish Navy	The cutter ran aground and was wrecked at Mjóvanes, Faroe Islands.

=== 10 May ===
List of shipwrecks: 10 May 1966
Ship	State	Description
Capetown Castle	United Kingdom	The ocean liner ran aground off Vlissingen, Netherlands. Refloated undamaged later that day.

=== 11 May ===
List of shipwrecks: 11 May 1966
Ship	State	Description
C-100	Vietnam People's Navy	Vietnam War: The naval trawler, a blockade runner, either was bombed and sunk by South Vietnamese Air Force aircraft or destroyed by gunfire while beached near the Ca Mau Peninsula in South Vietnam by the cutters USCGC Point Cypress and USCGC Point Grey (both United States Coast Guard).

=== 14 May ===
List of shipwrecks: 14 May 1966
Ship	State	Description
Newgrove	Cyprus	The Ocean ship ran aground off Puerto Padre, Cuba. The wreck was abandoned to the Cuban authorities.

=== 17 May ===
List of shipwrecks: 17 May 1966
Ship	State	Description
Fina Norvege	Belgium	The tanker ran aground on Cani Island, Tunisia. Her cargo was transferred to Fina Canada (Belgium). She was refloated on 31 May, rebuilt with a new bow section and returned to service.
Pioneer Cebu	Philippines	The ferry foundered off Cebu Island during Typhoon Irma. Of the 305 passengers and crew, at least 175 were killed.

=== 18 May ===
List of shipwrecks: 18 May 1966
Ship	State	Description
Aurora	Greece	The Liberty ship sprang a leak and was abandoned in the Atlantic Ocean 300 nautical miles (560 km) east of Cape Race, Canada. Presumed subsequently sank.

=== 24 May ===
List of shipwrecks: 24 May 1966
Ship	State	Description
Kaitawa	New Zealand	The collier foundered 10 nautical miles (19 km) off Cape Reinga with the loss of all 29 crew.

=== 26 May ===
List of shipwrecks: 26 May 1966
Ship	State	Description
Eastern Mariner	Panama	Vietnam War: The cargo ship struck a mine and sank in the Saigon River in South Vietnam. She was salvaged in 1968 and scrapped.

=== 28 May ===
List of shipwrecks: 28 May 1966
Ship	State	Description
P A F #13	United States	A storm destroyed the barge at Sitkinak Island in the Kodiak Archipelago off Alaska.

=== 30 May ===
List of shipwrecks: 30 May 1966
Ship	State	Description
Andrea	United States	The 9-gross register ton, 33.6-foot (10.2 m) fishing vessel was lost after she collided with an unidentified object in Chatham Strait in the Alexander Archipelago in Southeast Alaska off Point Marsden (58°03′30″N 134°48′25″W).
Tempo	Panama	The Liberty ship was driven ashore in a typhoon at Kaohsiung, Taiwan. She was declared a constructive total loss and scrapped.

=== Unknown date ===
List of shipwrecks: Unknown date May 1966
Ship	State	Description
USS Tingey	United States Navy	The Fletcher-class destroyer was sunk as a target in the Pacific Ocean off San Francisco, California.

== June ==
=== 1 June ===
List of shipwrecks: 1 June 1966
Ship	State	Description
P A F #23	United States	A tsunami destroyed the barge at Sitkinak Island in the Kodiak Archipelago off Alaska.

=== 2 June ===
List of shipwrecks: 2 June 1966
Ship	State	Description
Kawana	Hong Kong	The cargo ship caught fire in the Chittagong Roads. She was beached but broke in two and was declared a total loss. She was on a voyage from Chinwantao to Chittagong, East Pakistan.

=== 6 June ===
List of shipwrecks: 6 June 1966
Ship	State	Description
Cordova	United States	The 55-gross register ton, 79.2-foot (24.1 m) fishing vessel was destroyed by fire in the Copper River Flats near Cordova, Alaska.

=== 8 June ===
List of shipwrecks: 8 June 1966
Ship	State	Description
Frederick C	United States	The 73-gross register ton, 69.1-foot (21.1 m) fishing vessel was wrecked on the south-central coast of Alaska east of Ocean Cape (59°32′30″N 139°51′30″W) at 59°32′N 139°51′W.

=== 10 June ===
List of shipwrecks: 10 June 1966
Ship	State	Description
Dixmude	French Navy	The decommissioned Avenger-class escort aircraft carrier was sunk as a target by United States Navy forces.

=== 16 June ===
List of shipwrecks: 16 June 1966
Ship	State	Description
Alva Cape	United Kingdom	The tanker collided with Texaco Massachusetts (United States), and caught fire, killing 33 people on board both ships and the tugs Esso Vermont and Latin America.

=== 19 June ===
List of shipwrecks: 19 June 1966
Ship	State	Description
C-187	Vietnam People's Navy	Vietnam War: When her scuttling charges failed to detonate, the blockade runner was captured by South Vietnamese forces after running aground near the mouth of the Cổ Chiên River in the Mekong Delta in South Vietnam while trying to escape attack by the destroyer USS John A. Bole, the destroyer escort USS Haverfield, and the dock landing ship USS Tortuga (all United States Navy).
Zanita	Liberia	The Liberty ship developed a leak and sank off the Kuria Muria Islands 17°56′N 58°20′E). She was on a voyage from Mormugao, India to Trieste, Italy. All crew rescued by the Ol-class tanker RFA Olna (Royal Navy).

=== 25 June ===
List of shipwrecks: 25 June 1966
Ship	State	Description
USS Stalwart	United States Navy	The Aggressive-class minesweeper caught fire, capsized and sank at San Juan, Puerto Rico. She was later refloated and scrapped.

=== 26 June ===
List of shipwrecks: 26 June 1966
Ship	State	Description
Elpis	Panama	The cargo ship caught fire 60 nautical miles (110 km) off Colombo, Ceylon and was abandoned by her crew. She was taken in tow by Exemplar (flag unknown) and anchored off Colombo. Elpis was on a voyage from Mormugao, India to Japan. The fire was extinguished on 30 June and she was towed in to Trincomalee, Ceylon by the tugs Maas and Orinoco (both Netherlands). Elpis was declared a constructive total loss and consequently scrapped.

=== 28 June ===
List of shipwrecks: 28 June 1966
Ship	State	Description
Alva Cape	United Kingdom	The tanker exploded whilst her cargo of naptha was being unloaded in New York Harbor, killing four people.

=== 29 June ===
List of shipwrecks: 29 June 1966
Ship	State	Description
Mystras	Liberia	The Liberty ship ran aground in the Elbe. She was later refloated but declared a constructive total loss and scrapped.

== July ==
=== 1 July ===
List of shipwrecks: 1 July 1966
Ship	State	Description
Sandy Joy	United States	The 9-gross register ton, 31.4-foot (9.6 m) fishing vessel was wrecked in Aniakchak Bay (56°42′N 157°22′W) on the Gulf of Alaska coast of the Alaska Peninsula.
South African Seafarer	South Africa	The cargo liner ran aground in Table Bay on the coast of South Africa and broke in two. All 76 people on board were rescued by South African Air Force helicopters.
T-333, T-336 and T-339	Vietnam People's Navy	Vietnam War: The T-333/Project 123K-class motor torpedo boats were sunk by U.S. aircraft while trying to attack the guided-missile destroyer USS Coontz and the destroyer USS Rogers (both United States Navy). 19 survivors rescued and made prisoners of war.

=== 2 July ===
List of shipwrecks: 2 July 1966
Ship	State	Description
P G No. 10	United States	The 8-gross register ton, 28.6-foot (8.7 m) fishing vessel was wrecked in southwest Alaska on the Kvichak River between King Salmon Creek and Copenhagen Creek.

=== 3 July ===
List of shipwrecks: 3 July 1966
Ship	State	Description
Alva Cape	United Kingdom	The burning tanker was scuttled by the cutter USCGC Spencer ( United States Coast Guard).
Andreas Panou	Panama	The cargo ship collided with Hoegh Aiglonne (Norway) and sank 5 nautical miles (9.3 km) off Cape Villano, Spain. She was on a voyage from Setúbal, Portugal to Sas van Ghent, Zeeland, Netherlands.

=== 5 July ===
List of shipwrecks: 5 July 1966
Ship	State	Description
Elias Dayfas II	Greece	The Liberty ship sprang a leak and was abandoned off the Yucatan Peninsula, Mexico (21°09′N 86°28′W. Presumed subsequently sank.

=== 8 July ===
List of shipwrecks: 8 July 1966
Ship	State	Description
Cosmos Altair	Panama	The Liberty ship ran aground on the Altair Reef (28°55′N 48°47′E). She was later refloated.

=== 10 July ===
List of shipwrecks: 10 July 1966
Ship	State	Description
Paestum	Italy	The Liberty ship sprang a leak in the Atlantic Ocean off Cape Hatteras, North Carolina, United States. She foundered the next day.

=== 11 July ===
List of shipwrecks: 11 July 1966
Ship	State	Description
USS Naifeh	United States Navy	The decommissioned John C. Butler-class destroyer escort was sunk as a target in the Pacific Ocean off San Clemente Island, California, by a combination of naval gunfire and aircraft attacks.

=== 12 July ===
List of shipwrecks: 12 July 1966
Ship	State	Description
Groote Beer	Greece	The Victory ship collided with the dredger Pen Avon (United Kingdom) off the Isle of Wight, United Kingdom. Groote Beer was on a voyage from Southampton, Hampshire, United Kingdom to New York, United States. Although temporary repairs were made, she was consequently withdrawn from service, laid up and scrapped.

=== 13 July ===
List of shipwrecks: 13 July 1966
Ship	State	Description
Marietta Nomikos, and Mosli	Greece; Norway	The tanker Mosli collided with the tanker Marietta Nomikos and caught fire west of Portugal. Her crew took to the lifeboats; they were rescued by Bayard (Norway). Marietta Nomikos also caught fire.
USS Ulvert M. Moore	United States Navy	The decommissioned John C. Butler-class destroyer escort was sunk as a target in the Pacific Ocean off San Nicolas Island in Californiaʼs Channel Islands by surface gunfire and by aircraft from the attack aircraft carrier USS Coral Sea (United States Navy).

=== 17 July ===
List of shipwrecks: 17 July 1966
Ship	State	Description
Bridlington Queen	United Kingdom	The passenger boat sprang a leak and sank at Bridlington, Yorkshire. All 120 on board rescued by various pleasure craft. Later refloated, repaired and returned to service.
Catherine J	United States	The 24-gross register ton, 40.2-foot (12.3 m) fishing vessel sank off a location identified in the wreck report as "Seal Cape Light" on the coast of Alaska. The report does not specify to which of several locations known as Seal Cape in Alaska it refers.
Kondor	Liberia	The Liberty ship ran aground at Onahama, Japan and was severely damaged. She was on a voyage from Kaohsiung, Taiwan to Onahama. She was refloated and towed in to Hakodate.

=== 20 July ===
List of shipwrecks: 20 July 1966
Ship	State	Description
Eastern Star	United Kingdom	The cargo ship was damaged by fire at Hong Kong. Ten of her crew were injured, and twelve were killed.

=== 25 July ===
List of shipwrecks: 25 July 1966
Ship	State	Description
Angelic	Panama	The Liberty ship ran aground at Nojima Saki, Japan. Later refloated but declared a constructive total loss and scrapped.
Favourite	United Kingdom	The 163-year-old Thames barge sank at Chiswick.
Koula F	Greece	The wreck of Koula F, known locally as the "Greek Ship," on 3 December 2008. The cargo ship ran aground in the Persian Gulf at Kish Island, Iran. She was declared a total loss.
Taiwind	Panama	The Liberty ship collided with the tanker St. Matthew (Flag unknown) 15 nautical miles (28 km) off Irosaki, Japan. She was declared a constructive total loss and scrapped.

=== 27 July ===
List of shipwrecks: 27 July 1966
Ship	State	Description
Peanut	United States	The 12-gross register ton, 31.2-foot (9.5 m) fishing vessel was destroyed by fire at Uyak (57°38′20″N 154°00′00″W), Alaska.

=== 28 July ===
List of shipwrecks: 28 July 1966
Ship	State	Description
Archangel Michael	Liberia	The Liberty ship ran aground near Okha Port, India (22°27′N 68°59′E) and broke in two, a total loss.
Horace Greely	United States Navy	The Liberty ship was scuttled in the Atlantic Ocean with a cargo of obsolete ammunition.

=== 30 July ===
List of shipwrecks: 30 July 1966
Ship	State	Description
Janet Glory	Liberia	The cargo ship ran aground at Spencer's Island, Nova Scotia, Canada. All 31 on board abandoned the ship by lifeboat and landed at Spencer's Wharf. Three local fishermen boarded the ship with the intention of salvage, but were killed when the ship exploded. Their fishing boat was also sunk.

=== 31 July ===
List of shipwrecks: 31 July 1966
Ship	State	Description
Chignik 2	United States	The 10-gross register ton, 29.8-foot (9.1 m) fishing vessel sank in Warner Bay (56°08′N 158°24′W) on the south coast of the Alaska Peninsula in Alaska.

== August ==
=== 2 August ===
List of shipwrecks: 2 August 1966
Ship	State	Description
AR 1	United States	The 8-gross register ton, 28.7-foot (8.7 m) fishing vessel was destroyed by fire at Koggiung, Alaska.
AR 5	United States	The 8-gross register ton, 28.7-foot (8.7 m) fishing vessel was destroyed by fire at Koggiung, Alaska.
AR 7	United States	The 8-gross register ton, 28.7-foot (8.7 m) fishing vessel was destroyed by fire at Koggiung, Alaska.
AR 8	United States	The 8-gross register ton, 27.5-foot (8.4 m) fishing vessel was destroyed by fire at Koggiung, Alaska.
AR 9	United States	The 8-gross register ton, 27.5-foot (8.4 m) fishing vessel was destroyed by fire at Koggiung, Alaska.
N S 10	United States	The 8-gross register ton, 27.5-foot (8.4 m) fishing vessel was destroyed by fire at Koggiung, Alaska.
N S 11	United States	The 8-gross register ton, 27.5-foot (8.4 m) fishing vessel was destroyed by fire at Koggiung, Alaska.
N S 22	United States	The 8-gross register ton, 29.2-foot (8.9 m) fishing vessel was destroyed by fire at Koggiung, Alaska.
N S 24	United States	The 8-gross register ton, 29.2-foot (8.9 m) fishing vessel was destroyed by fire at Koggiung, Alaska.
N S 25	United States	The 8-gross register ton, 29.2-foot (8.9 m) fishing vessel was destroyed by fire at Koggiung, Alaska.
N S 26	United States	The 8-gross register ton, 29.2-foot (8.9 m) fishing vessel was destroyed by fire at Koggiung, Alaska.

=== 8 August ===
List of shipwrecks: 8 August 1966
Ship	State	Description
Mystitchi	Soviet Union	The cargo ship ran aground in the Great Belt, Denmark.

=== 10 August ===
List of shipwrecks: 10 August 1966
Ship	State	Description
Diana	United States	The 13-gross register ton, 37.6-foot (11.5 m) fishing vessel was destroyed by fire in Judd Harbor (54°53′N 131°16′W) on the coast of Duke Island in the Gravina Islands of the Alexander Archipelago in Southeast Alaska.

=== 11 August ===
List of shipwrecks: 11 August 1966
Ship	State	Description
Dashava	Soviet Union	The cargo ship ran aground in the Great Belt, Denmark, while going to the assistance of Mystitchi (Soviet Union). The teleprinter hotline between the White House and the Kremlin was cut.

=== 14 August ===
List of shipwrecks: 14 August 1966
Ship	State	Description
Snug	United States	The 6-gross register ton, 27.8-foot (8.5 m) fishing vessel sank in Cook Inlet on the south-central coast of Alaska.

=== 17 August ===
List of shipwrecks: 17 August 1966
Ship	State	Description
Chrysanthi	Liberia	The Liberty ship ran aground on the Loculan Shoals, off the shore of Clarin, Misamis Occidental, Philippines whilst on a voyage from the Philippines to a European port and was damaged. She was later refloated and resumed her voyage.

=== 23 August ===
List of shipwrecks: 23 August 1966
Ship	State	Description
Baton Rouge Victory	United States	Vietnam War: The Victory ship was damaged by a limpet mine in the Long Tau River with the loss of seven crewmen killed and was beached to prevent her from sinking, although she nonetheless blocked the shipping channel. She was refloated on 30 August, towed to Vũng Tàu, South Vietnam, and scrapped in Taiwan in 1967.

=== 27 August ===
List of shipwrecks: 27 August 1966
Ship	State	Description
P S No. 76	United States	A storm destroyed the 337-gross register ton, 120-foot (36.6 m) barge at East Landing (57°07′10″N 170°16′00″W) on Saint Paul Island in the Pribilof Islands.

=== Unknown date ===
List of shipwrecks: Unknown date in August 1966
Ship	State	Description
Hunzeborg	Netherlands	The cargo ship was involved in a collision in the Strait of Dover, and was beached at Sandown, Kent.
USS Maurice J. Manuel	United States Navy	The decommissioned John C. Butler-class destroyer escort was sunk as a target.

== September ==
=== 1 September ===
List of shipwrecks: 1 September 1966
Ship	State	Description
Prins der Nederlands	Netherlands	The ocean liner ran aground off Flores, Azores, Portugal. Two hundred passengers taken off.

=== 3 September ===
List of shipwrecks: 3 September 1966
Ship	State	Description
Maria	Greece	The Channel tanker sprang a leak and sank south of Cyprus (34°21′N 34°50′E). Her crew survived. She was on a voyage from Haifa, Israel to Famagusta, Cyprus.

=== 7 September ===
List of shipwrecks: 7 September 1966
Ship	State	Description
Skagerak	Norway	The train ferry sank in the North Sea with the loss of two of the 147 people on board.
Hanseatic	West Germany	The ocean liner caught fire at New York. The fire developed in the engine room and gutted five decks.

=== 11 September ===
List of shipwrecks: 11 September 1966
Ship	State	Description
Chrysanthi	Liberia	The Liberty ship ran aground at Singapore whilst on a voyage from the Philippines to a European port and was damaged. She was later refloated and laid up at Singapore. Consequently scrapped in 1968.
Etta	United States	The 17-gross register ton, 41.6-foot (12.7 m) fishing vessel was lost after colliding with the vessel My Laddie (United States) 5,000 feet (1,500 m) off Beacon Point (56°56′15″N 132°59′30″W) in Southeast Alaska.

=== 12 September ===
List of shipwrecks: 12 September 1966
Ship	State	Description
Earl M	United States	The 10-gross register ton motor vessel sank at Swanson Harbor (58°11′30″N 135°05′00″W) in Southeast Alaska.

=== 13 September ===
List of shipwrecks: 13 September 1966
Ship	State	Description
Jeannette F	United States	The 74-gross register ton, 67.7-foot (20.6 m) fishing vessel was lost near Narrow Cape (57.4269°N 152.3289°W) on Kodiak Island south of Kodiak, Alaska, after colliding with the vessel Rosemary (United States) at 57°27′N 152°15′W.

=== 14 September ===
List of shipwrecks: 14 September 1966
Ship	State	Description
U-Hai	German Navy	The Type XXIII submarine foundered in the North Sea with the loss of all hands. The wreck was raised on 19 September and consequently scrapped.

=== 15 September ===
List of shipwrecks: 15 September 1966
Ship	State	Description
Tona	Panama	The cargo ship ran aground near Mihara, Japan. She was being towed from Moji to Kobe. She was refloated and taken in to Aioi. Consequently scrapped.

=== 16 September ===
List of shipwrecks: 16 September 1966
Ship	State	Description
August Moon	Hong Kong	August Moon aground The 10,240-gross register ton ore carrier ran aground on Pratas Island reef (20°42′08″N 116°43′39″E) during Typhoon Elsie. It broke up after the crew was rescued.

=== 18 September ===
List of shipwrecks: 23 March 1967
Ship	State	Description
New Bay Beauty	United States	The 11-gross register ton, 31.6-foot (9.6 m) fishing vessel was wrecked on East Amatuli Island (58°55′N 152°00′W) in the Barren Islands off the south-central coast of Alaska.

=== 19 September ===
List of shipwrecks: 19 September 1966
Ship	State	Description
Granikos	Lebanon	The Liberty ship ran aground off Pulo Sambu, Indonesia. She was later refloated and towed to Singapore where she was declared a constructive total loss.
Vergolivada	Lebanon	The cargo ship ran aground on the Doganarslan Bank, in the Dardanelles due to a rope becoming entangled around her propeller. She was on a voyage from Novorossiysk, Soviet Union to the Persian Gulf. She was refloated on 29 September.

=== 20 September ===
List of shipwrecks: 20 September 1966
Ship	State	Description
Ioanna	Greece	The cargo ship caught fire off Arzew, Algeria, and was scuttled two days later 5 nmi (9.26 km) offshore.

=== 25 September ===
List of shipwrecks: 25 September 1966
Ship	State	Description
City of Wellington	United Kingdom	The ocean liner was driven ashore in Tokyo Bay during a typhoon. Later refloated.

=== 26 September ===
List of shipwrecks: 26 September 1966
Ship	State	Description
Saggitatius	Liberia	The Liberty ship collided with Schwarzburg (West Germany) off Buenos Aires, Argentina and sank. She was refloated on 1 October. Subsequently scrapped.

=== 29 September ===
List of shipwrecks: 29 September 1966
Ship	State	Description
Eleni K	Greece	The Liberty ship broke in two and sank off Thevenard, South Australia. She was refloated on 17 November and beached on Goat Island (32°18′S 133°32′E where she subsequently broke up.

== October ==
=== 1 October ===
List of shipwrecks: 1 October 1966
Ship	State	Description
Bering	United States	The motor vessel sank off Deer Island (55°55′N 160°50′W) in Nelson Lagoon, Alaska.

=== 2 October ===
List of shipwrecks: 2 October 1966
Ship	State	Description
RVNS Le Van Bihn	Republic of Vietnam Navy	Vietnam War: The LCS(L)-class landing ship was sunk by the North Vietnamese 126th Special Naval Commandos with limpet mines.

=== 12 October ===
List of shipwrecks: 12 October 1966
Ship	State	Description
USS George A. Johnson	United States	George A. Johnson aground The 1,450-gross register ton decommissioned destroyer escort ran aground on Sharp Park Beach, Pacifica, California after the towing cable broke. She was later scrapped onsite. (37°37′34.43″N 122°29′43.01″W).

=== 15 October ===
List of shipwrecks: 15 October 1966
Ship	State	Description
Hernan Cortes	Panama	The Liberty ship ran aground on the Alacran Reef, off the Yucatan Peninsula, Mexico. She was on a voyage from Tampa, Florida, United States to Montevideo, Uruguay. She was later refloated but declared a constructive total loss and scrapped.
S J No. 9	United States	The 12-gross register ton, 31.1-foot (9.5 m) fishing vessel was destroyed by a storm in the Gulf of Alaska off Aiaktalik Island (56°42′N 154°03′W) in the Kodiak Archipelago.

=== 16 October ===
List of shipwrecks: 16 October 1966
Ship	State	Description
Fennia	Finland	The ferry ran aground in fog on a voyage between Turku, Finland and Stockholm, Sweden.

=== 18 October ===
List of shipwrecks: 18 October 1966
Ship	State	Description
Lumberjack	United States	The 4,924-gross register ton, 272.1-foot (82.9 m) barge was wrecked at Jorkins Point on Swindle Island in Milbanke Sound on the coast of the British Columbia in Canada.

=== 23 October ===
List of shipwrecks: 23 October 1966
Ship	State	Description
Hercules	United States	The 275-gross register ton, 116.9-foot (35.6 m) tug was destroyed by ice at Clarks Point (58°50′30″N 158°33′00″W) in Alaska's Nushagak River.
Pioneer Leyte	Philippines	The passenger ferry collided with the Victory ship Golden State (United States) and sank off Manila with the loss of 44 lives. Golden State rescued 160 survivors; about twelve more were rescued by other vessels.

=== 24 October ===
List of shipwrecks: 24 October 1966
Ship	State	Description
Gulfscout	United States	The T2 tanker exploded and caught fire 60 nautical miles (110 km) off Morgan City, Louisiana. She was on a voyage from Port Arthur, Texas to Tampa, Florida. Abandoned by her crew, she capsized on 26 October and sank in November (28°38′N 91°44′W) She was refloated on 13 December in a capsized condition and was scuttled on 19 December (26°56′N 91°35′W).

=== Unknown date ===
List of shipwrecks: Unknown Date October 1966
Ship	State	Description
USNS American Mariner	United States Navy	The former range instrumentation ship was intentionally grounded on a sand bar in the Chesapeake Bay 7 nautical miles (13 km) east of Point Lookout, Maryland, between Point Lookout and Smith Island, Maryland, at 38°02′25″N 76°09′17″W for use as an aerial bombing target.
Mimi	Panama	The cargo ship was severely damaged by fire at Perama, Greece. Subsequently repaired and returned to service.
USS Suisun	United States Navy	The decommissioned Barnegat-class seaplane tender was sunk as a target by the United States Navy.

== November ==
=== 1 November ===
List of shipwrecks: 1 November 1966
Ship	State	Description
Derince	Turkey	The ferry collided with Taifun (Soviet Union) and sank in the Dardanelles. Derince was on a voyage from Çanakkale to Eceabat.
North Cape	United States	A tsunami destroyed the 86-gross register ton, 109.7-foot (33.4 m) barge in Cook Inlet near Anchorage, Alaska.

=== 3 November ===
List of shipwrecks: 3 November 1966
Ship	State	Description
Kitsap	United States	While under tow from the Pacific Northwest to Alaska, where she was to be employed as a floating cannery, the retired 526-gross register ton, 158.9-foot (48.4 m) ferry sank approximately 0.75 nautical miles (1.4 km; 0.9 mi) northwest of Tonki Cape Light (58°21′N 151°59′W) on the south-central coast of Alaska.
Marihora	Liberia	The cargo ship was driven ashore in a typhoon 2 nautical miles (3.7 km) south of Madras, India and broke in two. She was on a voyage from Singapore to Madras.
Stamatis	Liberia	The Liberty ship ran aground 4 nautical miles (7.4 km) south of Madras in a typhoon. She was on a voyage from Madras to Calcutta, India. She was subsequently wrecked on 10 November in another typhoon and declared a total loss.

=== 5 November ===
List of shipwrecks: 5 November 1966
Ship	State	Description
Ada	Italy	The dredger collided with Bocna (Yugoslavia) and sank at Lido de Venezia. Refloated on 4 February 1967, repaired and given a new diesel engine, returned to service.

=== 7 November ===
List of shipwrecks: 7 November 1966
Ship	State	Description
General Tsakolos	Greece	The Liberty ship ran aground in the Plentzia. She was on a voyage from Emden, West Germany to Bilbao, Spain. She was refloated the next day and towed in to Bilbao. Laid up, she was scrapped there in 1968.

=== 8 November ===
List of shipwrecks: 8 November 1966
Ship	State	Description
Bettles	United States	The landing craft ran aground and broke up in gale off Semisopochnoi Island in the Aleutian Islands without loss of life. The seagoing buoy tender USCGC Balsam ( United States Coast Guard) rescued her crew.

=== 10 November ===
List of shipwrecks: 10 November 1966
Ship	State	Description
Shibam	Aden	The Shelt-type coaster was driven ashore at Salalah, Oman during a tropical cyclone. Later repaired and returned to service.
White Eagle	Greece	The Liberty ship ran aground on San Clemente Island, California, United States (32°55′N 118°33′W), a total loss.

=== 11 November ===
List of shipwrecks: 11 November 1966
Ship	State	Description
Isle of Gigha	United Kingdom	The roll-on/roll-off ferry capsized off the west coast of Scotland. She was salvaged and returned to service.

=== 13 November ===
List of shipwrecks: 13 November 1966
Ship	State	Description
Omega	Liberia	The Liberty ship suffered a fractured hull and was abandoned in the Pacific Ocean (6°57′N 125°53′W). Presumed subsequently foundered.

=== 14 November ===
List of shipwrecks: 14 November 1966
Ship	State	Description
Jalisco	United States	The 366-foot (112 m), concrete-hulled cargo ship sank in rough seas on the Cortes Bank at Bishops Rock (32°27′N 119°07′W) breaking into three sections in 6 to 35 feet (1.8 to 10.7 m) of water.
Marina di Sapri	Italy	The cargo ship struck the wreck of Ada (Italy) and sank.

=== 16 November ===
List of shipwrecks: 16 November 1966
Ship	State	Description
Julie	United States	The 20-gross register ton, 36.3-foot (11.1 m) fishing vessel sank at Meyers Chuck, Alaska.
Marina di Sapri	Italy	The cargo ship struck the wreck of Ada (Italy) and sank in the Lido de Venezia.

=== 17 November ===
List of shipwrecks: 17 November 1966
Ship	State	Description
Ypapanti	Panama	The cargo ship ran aground on Long Sands Head Shoal, 15 nautical miles (28 km) off Harwich, Essex, United Kingdom and broke in two. Assistance was given by the Walton on the Naze lifeboat. Ypapanti was on a voyage from the River Tyne to Lisbon, Portugal.

=== 19 November ===
List of shipwrecks: 19 November 1966
Ship	State	Description
Nordmeer	West Germany	Nordmeer During a voyage from Hamburg, West Germany, to Chicago, Illinois, with a cargo of 990 coils of rolled steel, the 471-foot (144 m), 8,683-gross register ton motor cargo ship was wrecked on Thunder Bay Shoal in Lake Huron at 45°08.161′N 83°009.586′W, off the coast of Michigan about 7 nautical miles (13 km; 8.1 mi) north of Thunder Bay Island. A United States Coast Guard helicopter removed her crew on 26 November when a storm with 50-mile-per-hour (80 km/h) winds and 22-foot (6.7 m) waves struck her. Visible at the surface for several decades, the wreck eventually became submerged in 40 feet (12 m) of water.

=== 20 November ===
List of shipwrecks: 20 November 1966
Ship	State	Description
Eastern Argo	Liberia	The Liberty ship was driven ashore at Mapingil, Philippines.

=== 25 November ===
List of shipwrecks: 25 November 1966
Ship	State	Description
Can-do	United States	The buoy tender sank off Anchor Point, Alaska, with the loss of three lives.

=== 27 November ===
List of shipwrecks: 27 November 1966
Ship	State	Description
C-41	Vietnam People's Navy	Vietnam War: The blockade runner was run aground at Đức Phổ, South Vietnam. to avoid capture. Two crewmen were killed after abandoning ship when they went back to her to check scuttling charges that failed to detonate on schedule but which detonated when they approached.

=== 28 November ===
List of shipwrecks: 28 November 1966
Ship	State	Description
Tegean	Greece	The Liberty ship ran aground on Sisters Shoal, Sambro Island, and was wrecked.

=== 29 November ===
List of shipwrecks: 29 November 1966
Ship	State	Description
Daniel J. Morrell	United States	The Great Lakes freighter — a 603-foot (184 m), 7,239-gross register ton bulk carrier — broke in half and sank in 220 feet (67 m) of water in Lake Huron during a storm with the loss of 28 of her 29 crewmen.
Nedi	Panama	The cargo ship ran aground on Fehmarn, West Germany. She was on a voyage from Kiel, West Germany to Taiwan. She was refloated on 2 December and towed back to Kiel. Although temporary repairs were made, she was sold and scrapped.

=== 30 November ===
List of shipwrecks: 30 November 1966
Ship	State	Description
Nightmare	United States	The fishing vessel disappeared along with both people aboard – a husband and wife – during a voyage from Seldovia to Halibut Cove, Alaska.
Pionere	Italy	The tug capsized while assisting Guglielmo Marconi (Italy) at Messina. Refloated on 22 January 1967, repaired and returned to service.

=== Unknown date ===
List of shipwrecks: Unknown date in November 1966
Ship	State	Description
Stamatis	Liberia	The Liberty ship was driven ashore and wrecked in a typhoon at Madras, India.

== December ==
=== 1 December ===
List of shipwrecks: 1 December 1966
Ship	State	Description
519	United States	The 210-gross register ton, 103.8-foot (31.6 m) barge sank in Chatham Strait off Takatz Island (57°08′N 134°48′W) in the Alexander Archipelago in Southeast Alaska.

=== 2 December ===
List of shipwrecks: 2 December 1966
Ship	State	Description
Humboldt	Peru	The Liberty ship ran aground on the Banjaard Sand, in the North Sea whilst under tow for scrapping. She was refloated on 4 December and taken in to Vlissingen, Zeeland, Netherlands. Voyage recommenced under tow on 9 December.

=== 7 December ===
List of shipwrecks: 7 December 1966
Ship	State	Description
Cindy	Liberia	The Liberty ship caught fire off Kobe, Japan. She was on a voyage from Mormugao, India to Amagasaki, Japan. She was beached on Awaji Island. Refloated on 16 December and towed in to Amagasaki. Declared a constructive total loss, she was scrapped at Hirao, Japan in March 1967.

=== 8 December ===
List of shipwrecks: 8 December 1966
Ship	State	Description
Heraklion	Greece	The passenger ferry capsized and sank in the Aegean Sea

=== 11 December ===
List of shipwrecks: 11 December 1966
Ship	State	Description
U F 21	United States	The 17-gross register ton, 34.2-foot (10.4 m) fishing vessel was destroyed by fire at Port Lions, Alaska.

=== 12 December ===
List of shipwrecks: 12 December 1966
Ship	State	Description
Agia Varvara	Greece	The coaster caught fire, then capsized and sank off Jeddah, Saudi Arabia. She was on a voyage from Jeddah to Suez, Egypt.
Boston Wellvale	United Kingdom	The 137.16-foot (41.81 m) fishing vessel ran ashore on Cape Arnanes, Iceland in a gale and snowstorm. Crew rescued by Breeches buoy. Declared a Total Loss, but the wreck was purchased by an Icelander. Refloated 8 August, 1967 by gunboat ICGV Albert (Iceland). Repaired and put in Icelandic service in 1971 as "Ran".
Contentia	West Germany	The cargo ship collided with the Bull Lightship ( Trinity House) and sank at the mouth of the Humber.
Eldorita	United Kingdom	The coaster foundered north west of Hook of Holland, Netherlands. All four crew survived.
Elke	West Germany	The coaster collided with another ship and sank in the Humber Estuary.
Zebra	Canada	The 115-foot (35 m) fishing vessel went aground 1 mile from Ile Aux Morts, Newfoundland, a Total Loss. One crewman died.

=== 15 December ===
List of shipwrecks: 15 December 1966
Ship	State	Description
Shelikof	United States	The 72-foot (21.9 m) crab-fishing vessel foundered and drifted ashore at Cape Lazaref (54°37′00″N 163°35′10″W) on Unimak Island in the Aleutian Islands, where the surf pounded her to pieces. Her four-man crew survived and was rescued from the beach, two by the tug Trojan (United States) and two by the medium endurance cutter USCGC Storis ( United States Coast Guard).

=== 18 December ===
List of shipwrecks: 18 December 1966
Ship	State	Description
USS Colahan	United States Navy	The decommissioned Fletcher-class destroyer was sunk as a target in the Pacific Ocean off the coast of California.

=== 19 December ===
List of shipwrecks: 19 December 1966
Ship	State	Description
Gulfstag	United States	The T2 tanker was scuttled in the Gulf of Mexico (26°56′N 91°35′W).

=== 30 December ===
List of shipwrecks: 30 December 1966
Ship	State	Description
USS Mahnomen County	United States Navy	The LST-542-class tank landing ship was driven ashore off Chu Lai, South Vietnam, by the 18-foot (5.5-meter) surf and high winds of a typhoon.

=== 31 December ===
List of shipwrecks: 31 December 1966
Ship	State	Description
Oriana	Panama	The cargo liner caught fire at Kaohsiung, Taiwan. She was grounded due to the amount of water pumped aboard during firefighting operations. She was refloated on 4 January 1967 and declared a constructive total loss.
Refrigerator 10	Soviet Union	The 239-foot (72.8 m) refrigerator ship sank in the Bering Sea 35 nautical miles (65 km; 40 mi) north of Unimak Pass with the loss of about 50 lives. Soviet fishing vessels rescued about 50 survivors.

== Unknown date ==
List of shipwrecks: Unknown Date 1966
Ship	State	Description
USS Corson	United States Navy	The decommissioned Barnegat-class seaplane tender was sunk as a target by the United States Navy.
Edward A. Filene	United States	The Liberty ship was sunk as a breakwater and dock at Cook Inlet, Alaska.
Francis Garnier	French Navy	The decommissioned sloop-of-war was sunk as a target in a nuclear weapon test in the Pacific Ocean.
Howell Cobb	United States	The Liberty ship was sunk as a breakwater and dock at Cook Inlet.
Nafsiporos	Greece	The cargo ship foundered in the Irish Sea. Her crew were rescued by the Holyhead Lifeboat.
