= Graveyard Point =

Graveyard Point may refer to:

- Graveyard Point, in Chesuncook, Maine, U.S.
- Graveyard Point, where the Coates Drain canal is located, Malheur County, Oregon, U.S.
- Graveyard Point, in the Koggiung area of Alaska, U.S.
