= Southern Islands (disambiguation) =

Southern Island or Southern Islands may refer to

== Locations ==
- Southern Islands, an area in central, Singapore
  - Southern Islands Constituency, a former election constituency located in the above area
- Yuzhny Island (Russian: Южный остров, romanized: Yuzhniy ostrov, lit. 'southern island'), an island in Russia
- Ryukyu Islands, called Nantō (南島, "Southern Islands") by The folklorist Kunio Yanagita and his followers

== Other ==
- SS Southern Island, a British cargo ship in service from 1947 to 1951
- Southern Islands (GPU family), a GPU family
- Southern Islands (Pokémon Trading Card Game), a set of Pokémon Trading Cards

== See also ==
- South Island
- Southern Isles
