= USS Salinan =

Tugboat of the United States Navy

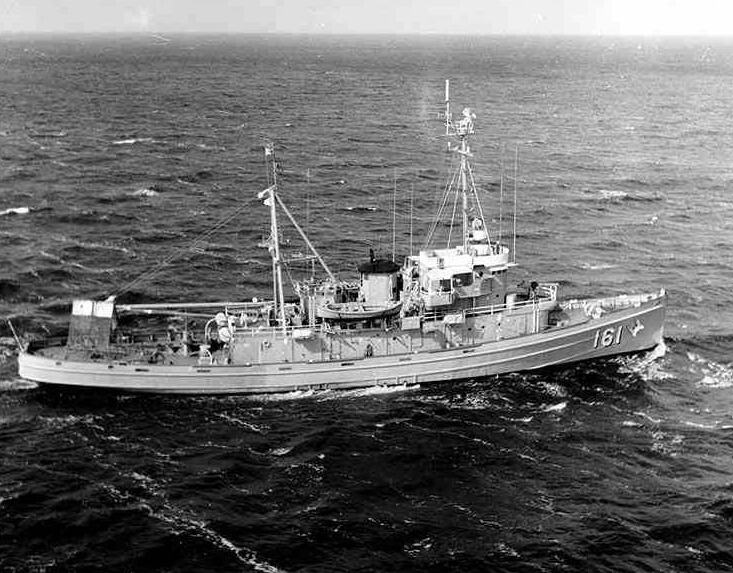
- Salinan underway during the late 1960s or early 1970s

History

United States
- Name: USS Salinan
- Builder: Charleston Shipbuilding & Drydock Co.
- Laid down: 13 April 1945
- Launched: 20 July 1945
- Commissioned: 9 November 1945
- Decommissioned: 1 September 1978
- Fate: Sold under the Security Assistance Program to Venezuela, 1 September 1978

Venezuela
- Name: Contralmirante Miguel Rodriguez
- Acquired: 1 September 1978
- Decommissioned: 2003

General characteristics
- Class & type: Abnaki-class tug
- Displacement: 1,205 long tons (1,224 t) light; 1,646 long tons (1,672 t) full
- Length: 205 ft (62 m)
- Beam: 38 ft 7 in (11.76 m)
- Draft: 16 ft 9 in (5.11 m)
- Propulsion: Diesel-electric; 4 × General Motors 12-278A diesel main engines driving 4 × General Electric generators and 3 × General Motors 3-268A auxiliary services engines, single screw
- Speed: 16 knots (18 mph; 30 km/h)
- Complement: 8 officers, 68 enlisted men
- Armament: 1 × 3"/50 caliber gun (1945-1977); 2 × 40 mm guns (1945-1952); 2 × 20 mm guns (1945-1952)

USS Salinan (ATF-161) was an Abnaki-class tug built for the United States Navy during World War II. Named after the Salinan peoples (native inhabitants of what is now the Central Coast of California, in the Salinas Valley), she was the only U.S. Naval vessel to bear the name.

Salinan was laid down on 13 April 1945 by the Charleston Shipbuilding and Dry Dock Company of Charleston, South Carolina; launched on 20 July 1945; sponsored by Mrs. Lillie E. Hilton; and commissioned on 9 November 1945.

== Service history ==
=== 1946–1950 ===
Assigned to Service Force, Atlantic Fleet, and attached initially to Service Squadron 1 (ServRon 1), Salinan completed shakedown in Chesapeake Bay early in the new year, 1946. She then conducted several towing assignments along the mid-Atlantic and southeastern coasts of the United States. In March, she sailed to Key West, where she relieved the USS Seneca as the fleet ocean tug assigned to the Surface Antisubmarine Development Detachment (later called the Key West Test and Evaluation Detachment). Among her first assignments was towing a fleet barge carrying a two-man submersible down the Mississippi River and across the Gulf to Key West later that year. 15 October 1946 found her back at Charleston Navy Yard, and while maneuvering out her slip that afternoon, Salinan collided with USS John W. Weeks, carrying away the destroyer's starboard propeller guard. Several bulkheads were damaged on both vessels.

On 26 April 1948, while engaged in services at Key West, the submarine Cochino collided with Salinan while conducting a submerged exercise at a 60-foot depth. Cochinosuffered damage to her periscope shears, both periscopes, and radar antenna, requiring major repairs. Damage to the tug was minimal however, requiring only a short period in dry dock.

=== 1950–1962 ===
In November 1950, Salinan and Luiseno, rendered assistance to destroyers Charles H. Roan, and Brownson, which had collided off Bermuda during night maneuvers. The damage to both destroyers was substantial, and resulted in the deaths of six sailors. Roan's engines were knocked out by the collision, and were henceforth taken in tow by Luiseno. Brownson, a large section of her bow missing, limped to Bermuda under her own power, escorted by Salinan, and arrived safely in Bermuda a few days later.

Salinan remained based at Key West for the next 17 years – despite transfers to ServRon 4 and ServRon 8 – and continued to provide towing, recovery, salvage, rescue, and fire-fighting services in addition to those required by the Development Detachment. She remained primarily in the Caribbean and Gulf of Mexico, but was occasionally sent further north, operating near Norfolk, Virginia and the New England coast. Tows ranged in size from targets and district craft to floating cranes and dry docks, minecraft, destroyers, and tankers. Her crowded schedule was periodically interrupted for overhauls, training, and fleet exercises. In 1956, Salinan was awarded the Navy Award of Excellence for best in the Atlantic.

=== 1962–1971 ===
The fleet tug's normal duties were interrupted by the Cuban Missile Crisis in late 1962, during which she provided critical support services in the immediate area along with several of her sister ships. Operating in standby emergency status from 24 October to 10 December that year, Salinan participated in quarantine operations and aided in staging vessels and equipment for a possible invasion of Cuba. The ship was a frequent presence at Guantanamo Bay during this period. Tensions in the Caribbean remained high throughout the mid-1960s, and Salinan spent much of her time in the waters surrounding Cuba and the Dominican Republic performing a variety of functions.

In November 1966, the fleet tug steamed to San Juan, Puerto Rico to take the refloated minesweeper Stalwart in tow, which had sunk at the pier following a fire in her machinery space. Salinan arrived in Charleston with Stalwart later that month.

On 7 January 1967, the fleet tug shifted her homeport to Mayport, Florida. Increased training services- target towing and torpedo recovery- did not diminish her towing, rescue, and development support work. The following year, Salinan added support operations for NASA to her achievements, serving as the launch site sea salvage vessel for the Apollo 8 mission. As such, she stood by for recovery purposes should the mission be aborted within a few minutes after launch. She performed the same service for Apollo 10, and in July 1969 stood by for the historic launch of Apollo 11 – the first successful lunar landing. On 26 July 1971, Salinan served NASA once more for the launch of Apollo 15, for which she also recorded sonic boom data for analysis by NASA personnel.

=== 1971–1978 ===
During the 1970s, Salinan made several transatlantic deployments to Holy Loch, Scotland, towing sections of the floating dry dock Los Alamos. She also recovered a number of downed aircraft during this period, including salvaging a Navy helicopter from considerable depth. On 14 April 1975, Salinan departed Mayport in the midst of a severe gale to render assistance to the gunboat Beacon, which had become disabled and lost power during the storm. High seas and gale-force winds battered the stranded gunboat for eight hours until Salinan arrived to tow her back to Mayport early the next morning.

The veteran tug continued to provide valuable towing, rescue, and salvage services along the east coast of the United States throughout the remainder of her career, and was decommissioned at Mayport on 1 September 1978. That same day she was struck from the Naval Vessel Register and transferred, cash sale, to Venezuela under the Security Assistance Program.

=== Venezuelan Navy ===
Upon arrival there, she began her new career with the Venezuelan Navy as Contralmirante Miguel Rodriguez (R-23 and later RA-33). Based in Puerto Cabello, she served that navy for another 25 years as a patrol gunboat, salvage vessel, and hydrographic research vessel before finally being retired in 2003. As of early 2007, the ship sat out of commission moored at Puerto Cabello, her condition deteriorating.

== Awards ==
During her service with the US Navy, Salinan was awarded the Navy Meritorious Unit Commendation four times, more than any vessel in her class. She was also awarded the World War II Victory Medal, American Campaign Medal, National Defense Service Medal (2), and the Armed Forces Expeditionary Medal for her service in Cuba.

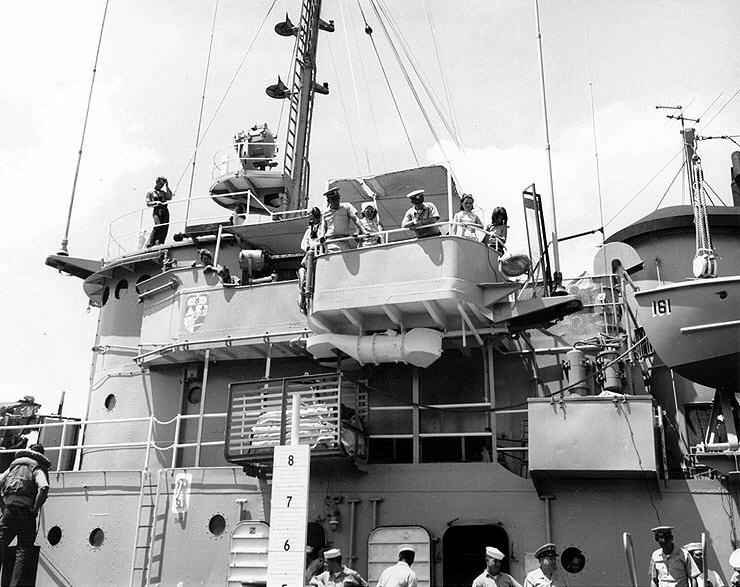
View of USS Salinan (ATF-161)'s port bridge while underway during a dependent's cruise, 18 May 1968.

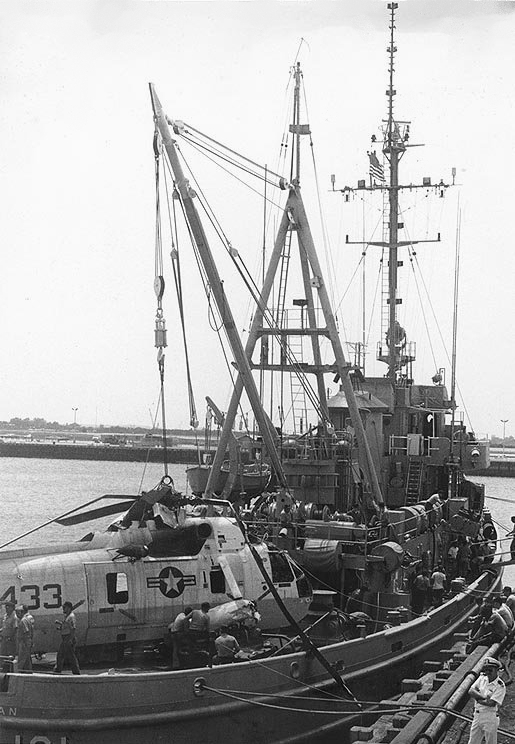
USS Salinan (ATF-161) in port, with an SH-3 Sea King helicopter on her deck, June 1976. She had recovered the helicopter from seventy feet of water after it crash-landed and sank ten miles off the coast of Ponte Vedra, southeast of Mayport, Florida. The aircraft belonged to Helicopter Antisubmarine Squadron One (HS-1), based at Naval Air Station Jacksonville, Florida.
