= Donna Nook =

Coastal area and nature reserve in Lincolnshire, England

- Near North Somercotes, Lincolnshire in England
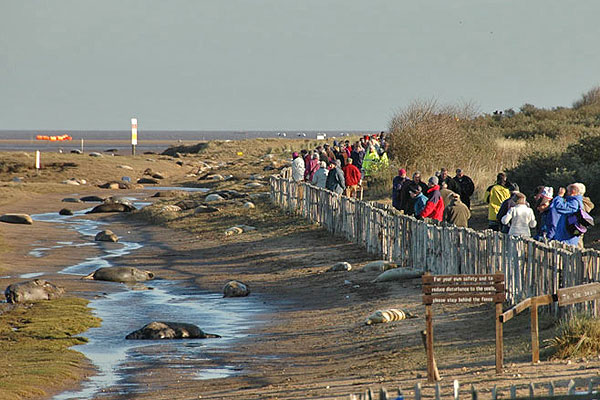
- Seals at Donna Nook fenceline in 2007

Site information
- Owner: Ministry of Defence
- Open to the public: Yes, in part
- Website: Lincolnshire Wildlife Trust; Donna Nook National Nature Reserve

Location
- Shown within Lincolnshire
- Coordinates: 53°28′29″N 000°09′07″E

Donna Nook is a point on the low-lying coast of north Lincolnshire, England, north of the village of North Somercotes and south of Grimsby. The area, a salt marsh, is used by a number of Royal Air Force stations in Lincolnshire for bombing practice and shares its name with RAF Donna Nook. The site was also made available to commercial organisations such as BMARC for firing tests.

Recognised as an important area for wildlife conservation, it is linked to the similar site at Saltfleetby-Theddlethorpe Dunes National Nature Reserve.

== History ==
On Sunday 3 April 1966 13 sailors died on the MV Anzio, from Aberdeen.

== Conservation area ==
Wildlife seems to have become accustomed to regular aircraft bombing according to The Wildlife Trust. The name is popularly supposed to be derived from a ship called The Donna, part of the Spanish Armada, which sank off the Nook (a small headland) in 1588.

A ten kilometres (6 mi) coastal strip stretching from Saltfleet in the south, to Somercotes Haven in the north, is managed by the Lincolnshire Wildlife Trust as a nature reserve. It is part of the land owned by the Ministry of Defence and used as a bombing range. The grey seal population return to breed from October to December every year. From 2007, when about 1,194 pups were born to 3,500 resident grey seal colony, births rates have grown to 2,066 pups born over the 2018 season. A double wooden fence was erected to ensure better separation and protection for both visitors and seals.

The reserve, staffed by full time wardens and volunteer seal wardens, is accessible to the public. Media coverage of Donna Nook has led to a big increase in visitor numbers; it was visited by about 43,000 people in 2006. Surplus money collected through sales is used to further support the protection of seals. The Lincolnshire Wildlife Trust has asked walkers and photographers to stay in the public viewing area and to avoid going out onto the sands, following an increase in seal mortality which coincided with an increase in visitor numbers in 2010 and criticism of the disturbance caused by photographers.

A 2023 initiative under King Charles' reign, a new combined National Nature Reserve (NNR), has been established linking with the similar site at Saltfleetby-Theddlethorpe Dune, becoming known together as the Lincolnshire Coronation Coast National Nature Reserve. It is the first new NNR declared as part of the King’s Series.

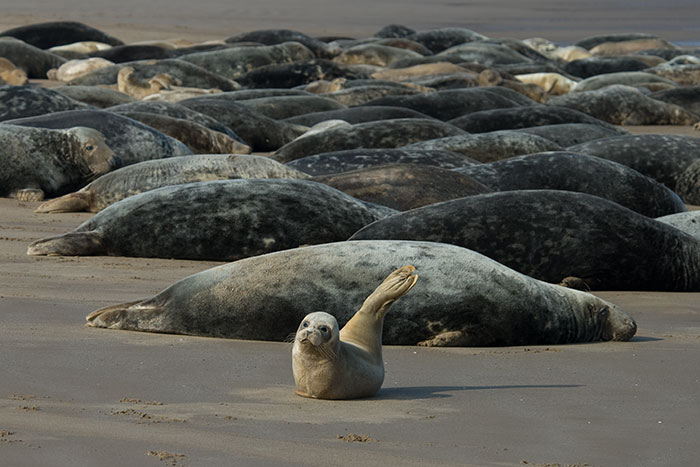
Grey seals at Donna Nook

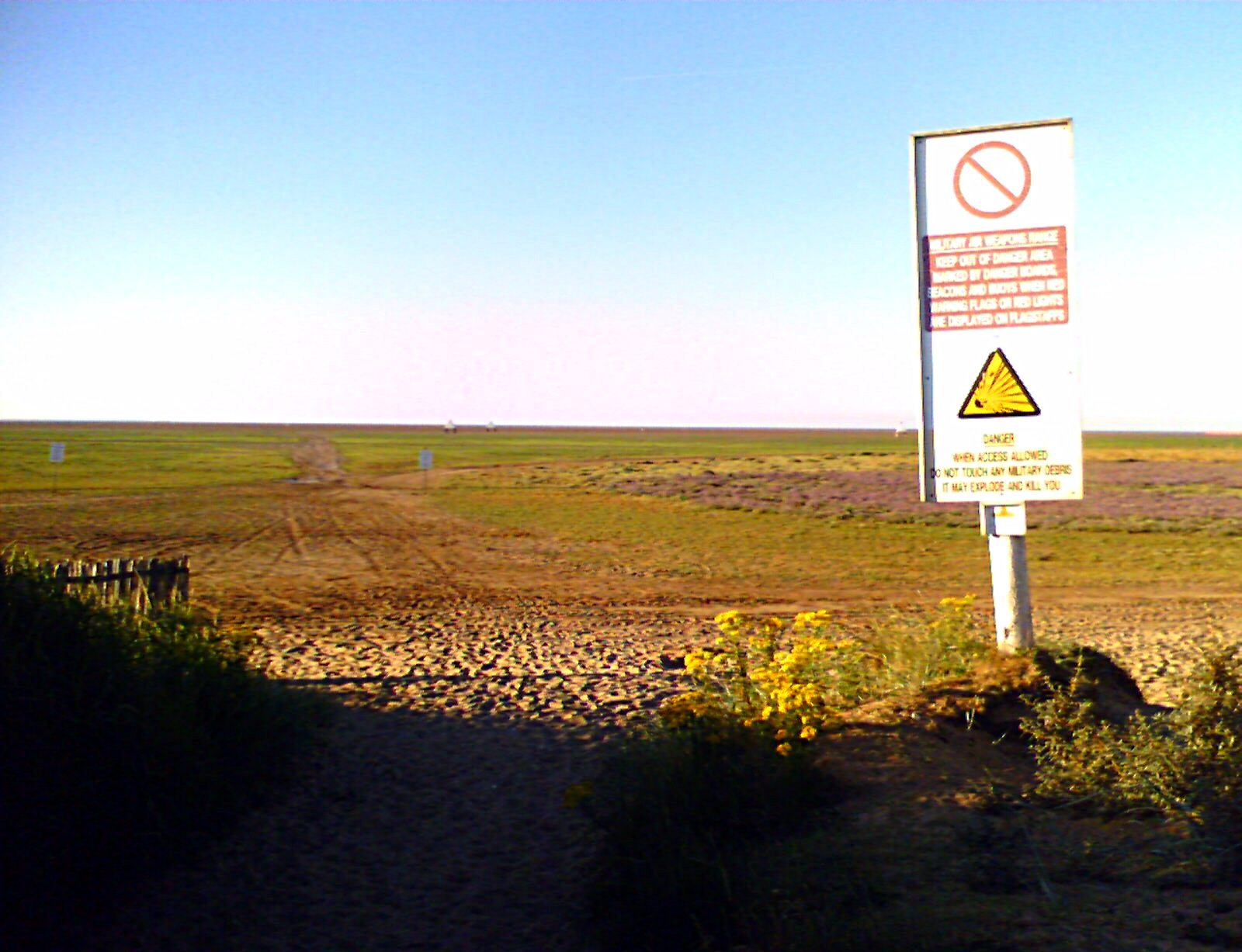
Overview of Donna Nook

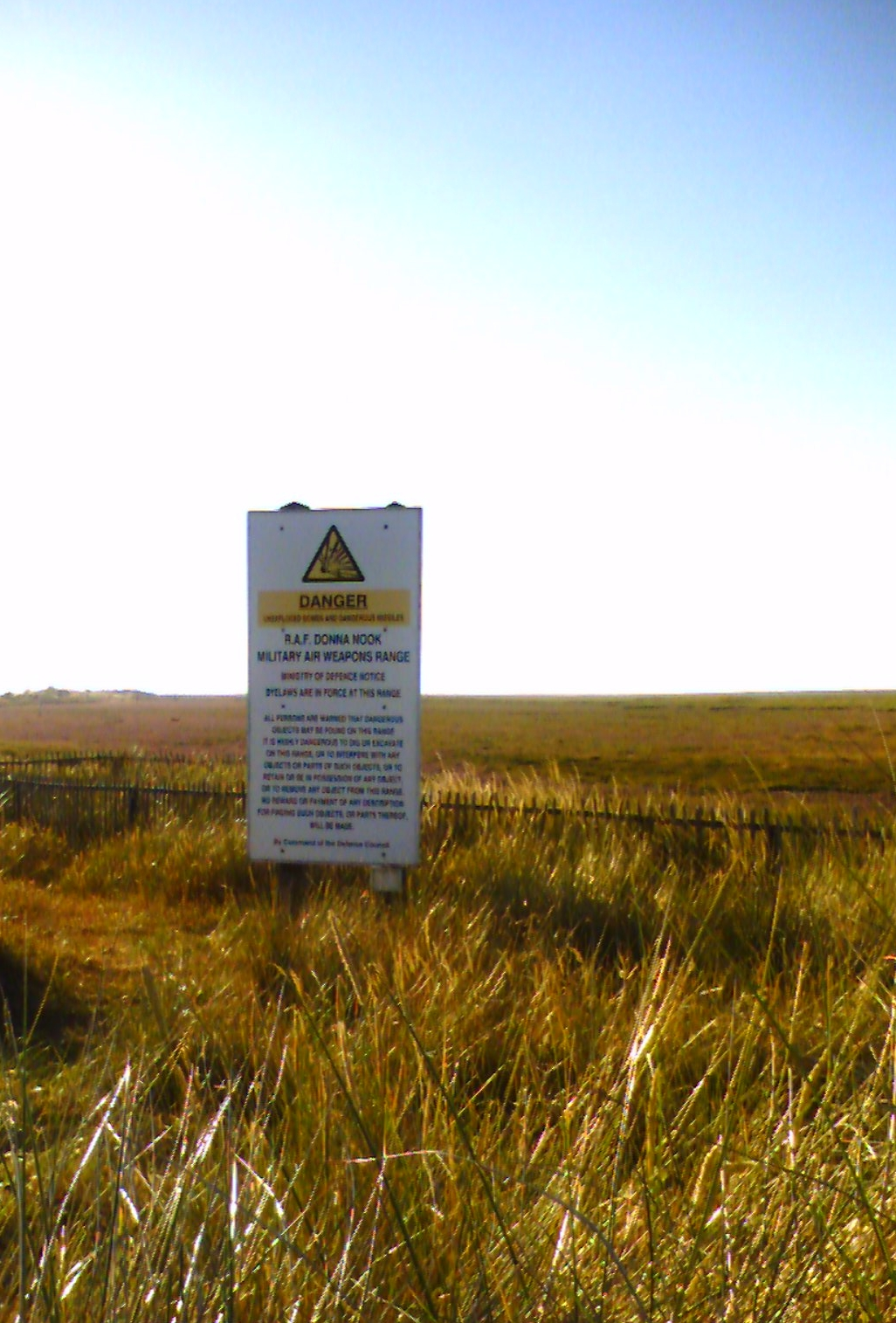
Salt marsh

== Notes ==
- "Donna Nook - Visitor Guide". BBC.
- "Coast - Donna Nook". BBC.
