= USCGC Escanaba (WHEC-64) =

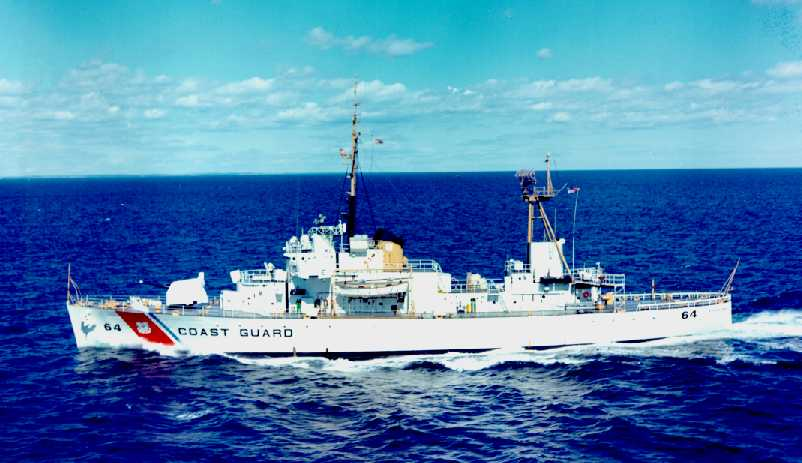
- USCGC Escanaba (WHEC-64), 1 September 1968

History

United States
- Builder: Western Pipe & Steel, Los Angeles, California
- Cost: Over $2,300,000 excluding armament
- Launched: 25 March 1945
- Christened: Otsego
- Commissioned: 20 March 1946
- Decommissioned: 28 June 1974
- Reclassified: WPG-64 to WHEC-64
- Fate: Scrapped, 1974
- Notes: WPS Hull No. 151.

General characteristics
- Type: Owasco-class cutter
- Displacement: 1,978 full (1966); 1,342 light (1966)
- Length: 254 ft (77.4 m) oa.; 245 ft (74.7 m) pp.
- Beam: 43 ft 1 in (13.1 m)
- Draft: 17 ft 3 in (5.3 m) (1966)
- Installed power: 4,000 shp (3,000 kW) (1945)
- Propulsion: 1 × Westinghouse electric motor driven by a turbine, (1945)
- Speed: 17 knots (31 km/h; 20 mph).
- Range: 6,157 mi (9,909 km) at 17 knots; 10,376 mi (16,699 km) at 10 knots (19 km/h; 12 mph) (1966)
- Complement: 10 officers, 3 warrants, 130 enlisted (1966)
- Sensors & processing systems: Detection Radar: SPS-23, SPS-29, Mk 26, Mk 27 (1966); Sonar: SQS-1 (1966)
- Armament: 1945: 2 × twin 5 in/38 cal. dual-purpose gun mounts; 2 × quad 40 mm AA gun mounts; 2 × depth charge tracks; 6 × "K" gun depth charge projectors; 1 × Hedgehog projector.; 1966: 1 × 5 in/38 cal. dual-purpose gun mount; 1 × Hedgehog projector
- Notes: Fuel capacity: 141,755 gal (Oil, 95%).

USCGC Escanaba (WHEC-64) was an Owasco-class high endurance cutter built for World War II service with the United States Coast Guard. The war ended before the ship was completed and consequently she never saw wartime service.

Escanaba was built by Western Pipe & Steel at the company's San Pedro shipyard. Named after Escanaba A city in Upper Michigan, and the first Escanaba- wpg class-77 . She was commissioned as a patrol gunboat with ID number WPG-64 on 20 March 1946. Her ID was later changed to WHEC-64 (HEC for "High Endurance Cutter" - the "W" signifies a Coast Guard vessel).

== Operational service ==
Escanaba was originally named Otsego after Otsego Lake in the state of New York. It was renamed in honor of the first Escanaba- wpg class-77 which was sunk during the Second World War. That cutter and a third still in service, were named for the city of Escanaba in the Upper Peninsula of Michigan. She was home ported at Alameda, California, from 1946 to 1954, and used for law enforcement, ocean station, and search and rescue operations in the Pacific. She was decommissioned and placed in storage from 1954 to 1957. From 1957 to 28 June 1973, she was stationed at New Bedford, Massachusetts, and used for law enforcement, ocean station, and search and rescue operations in the Atlantic.

In late November 1965, she assisted the US MV's American Pilot and Maumee Sun following their collision west of Cape Cod Canal. On 11 January 1966, she rescued two survivors from MV Monte Palomares after that ship sank in heavy seas with the loss of 32 lives. On 5 February 1967, she rescued two Cuban refugees from Elbow Cay. In January 1969, she was disabled 100 miles east of Virginia Beach, Virginia, when the aft bearing on the main motor burned out. She arrived at Norfolk, Virginia, on 20 January. From 28 December 1969 to 2 January 1970, she escorted the distressed East German MV Ange to Bermuda.

On 13 January 1970, she stood by the Norwegian MV Chandeleur in the mid-Atlantic until fire damage was repaired. Two days later, she escorted the distressed Norwegian MV Condo until Condo could proceed on her own. On 25 March 1970, she medevaced a crewman from the Korean MV Kumsong in the mid-Atlantic.

On 27 December 1970, Escanaba rescued 31 crewmembers from the rear section of the 540 feet Finnish tanker Ragny that had broken in two parts in a heavy mid-winter storm on 26 December about 600 miles south-east of Cape May. The six men that were stranded on the bow section, as well as one seaman of SS Platte who disappeared during an attempted rescue of Ragny's crew, perished in the accident. Escanaba crew was awarded the Coast Guard Unit Commendation and the Finnish Lifesaving Medal for the rescue.

Escanaba was decommissioned on 28 June 1974 and scrapped.
