= USS Stalwart (MSO-493) =

Minesweeper of the United States Navy

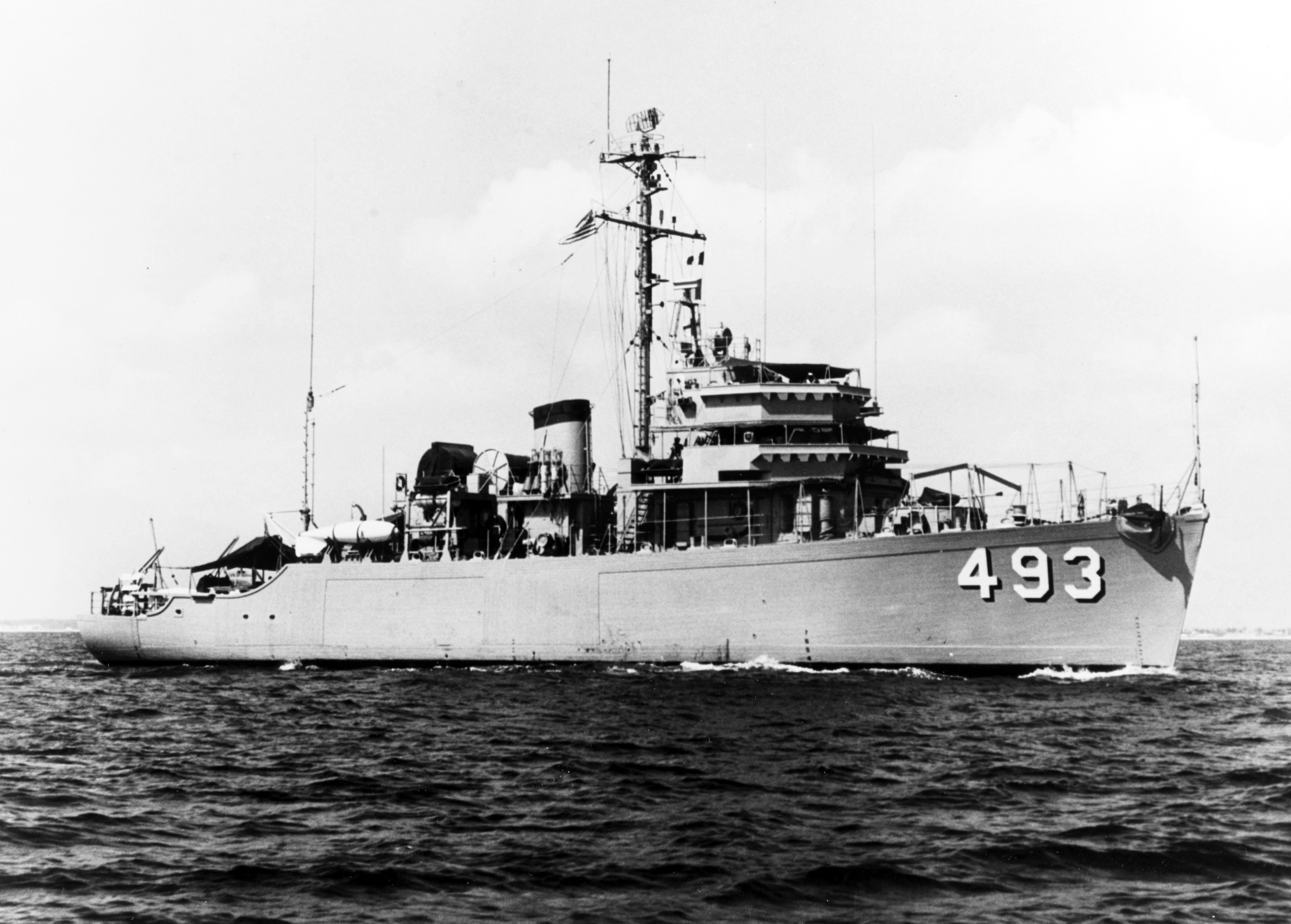
- USS Stalwart (MSO-493) in 1957

History

United States
- Laid down: 22 June 1954
- Launched: 3 December 1955
- Commissioned: 23 April 1957
- Decommissioned: 24 August 1966
- Stricken: 1 March 1967
- Home port: Charleston, South Carolina
- Fate: sunk 1966, scrapped 1967

General characteristics
- Displacement: 775 tons (full load)
- Length: 172 ft (52 m)
- Beam: 36 ft (11 m)
- Draught: 10 ft (3.0 m)
- Speed: 15 knots
- Complement: 74
- Armament: one 40 mm mount

USS Stalwart (MSO-493) was an Agile-class minesweeper acquired by the U.S. Navy for the task of removing mines that had been placed in the water to prevent the safe passage of ships.

The second ship to be named Stalwart by the Navy, MSO-493, ex-AM-493, was laid down on 22 June 1954 by Broward Marine Shipbuilding Co. Inc., Fort Lauderdale, Florida, launched on 3 December 1955; sponsored by Mrs. Dante B. Fascelli; and commissioned on 23 April 1957.

== East Coast operations ==
Stalwart was assigned to Mine Force, Atlantic Fleet, and Charleston, South Carolina, was designated her home port. She held her shakedown cruise in the Guantánamo Bay area during June and July. She entered the Charleston Navy Yard for an extensive overhaul period that was completed in February 1958 which made her, at that time, the most modern minesweeper in the U.S. Atlantic Fleet.

== Sixth Fleet deployment ==
Stalwart was deployed to the U.S. 6th Fleet from July to December to support American military forces during the Lebanon crisis. She was overhauled again from February to May 1959, after which she participated in various fleet exercises. In August, she was awarded the Battle Efficiency "E" for excellence in the performance of her assigned duties. In March and April 1960, Stalwart was selected to perform special project work for the evaluation of new mine hunting techniques with the Operational Test and Evaluation Force at Key West, Florida. In May, the minesweeper participated in amphibious exercises in the Caribbean and again from August to November. She was awarded the minesweeping "M" in August for excellence in minesweeping proficiency.

== Midshipmen training ==
In February 1961, Stalwart completed an overhaul and, after refresher training, participated in a joint United States-Canadian exercise off South Carolina. In June, she deployed to the Dominican Republic for fleet exercises and then held a midshipman training cruise to the Caribbean. Stalwart deployed to the U.S. 6th Fleet from September 1961 to 24 March 1962. She operated out of her home port until 29 May 1963 when her division, Mine Division 44, was deployed to the Caribbean for four and one-half months and returned to Charleston on 18 October.

== Stalwart burns and sinks ==
Stalwart resumed her normal routine until 28 March 1966 when her division was again deployed to the Caribbean. She was moored to the east side of the tender pier at San Juan, Puerto Rico, on 25 June when a fire broke out in her machinery space. Although Stalwartʼs crew and the crew of the high-speed transport USS Beverly W. Reid (APD-119) – in port for liberty after operations in the Caribbean – fought the fire for about nine hours, Stalwart capsized and sank. Stalwart was refloated by the rescue and salvage ships USS Escape (ARS-6) and USS Hoist (ARS-40) on 17 July and towed back to Charleston by the fleet tug USS Salinan (ATF-161) on 23 November.

== Final status ==
She was placed out of commission on 24 August 1966 and her name was struck from the Navy list on 1 March 1967. Stalwart was subsequently scrapped.
