= MV Monte Palomares =

MV Monte Palomares was a Spanish cargo ship that operated from 1961 until her sinking in 1966 with the loss of 32 of her 38 crew.

She was built by Euskalduna in Olaveaga, Bilbao, Spain. She was launched on 28 July 1961, and delivered to her owners in November 1961. Monte Palomares measured 5,973 GT and 10,500 DWT, and had a length of 144.7 metres (475 ft) and a beam of 18.7 metres (61 ft). She was powered by a diesel engine driving a single propeller that gave her a speed of 13 knots (15 mph). At the time of her loss, she was owned by Naviera Aznar and her captain was José Goitia.

In January 1966, Monte Palomares was sailing east from Norfolk, Virginia to Spain with 38 crewmembers and a cargo of corn when she encountered heavy weather, with winds up to 55 knots (63 mph) and seas up to 35 feet (11 m), about 840 miles (1,350 km) east-northeast of Bermuda. She issued a distress call midday on 10 January, and sank sometime later that day. In response to the call, the American cargo ship Steel Maker and the Danish cargo ship Thuro Maersk sailed for Monte Palomares, and the United States Coast Guard dispatched an aircraft from Newfoundland to search the area, as well as the cutter USCGC Barataria from Bermuda and the cutter USCGC Escanaba from her patrol in the area. In the early morning of 11 January, Steel Maker rescued four crewmembers from Monte Palomares, who had abandoned their ship in a life raft. Later in the day, Escanaba recovered a second life raft containing two survivors and the body of a Monte Palomares crewmember. On 14 January, the Coast Guard ended the search for further survivors.
