= USS Walter B. Cobb =

1944 Crosley-class high speed transport

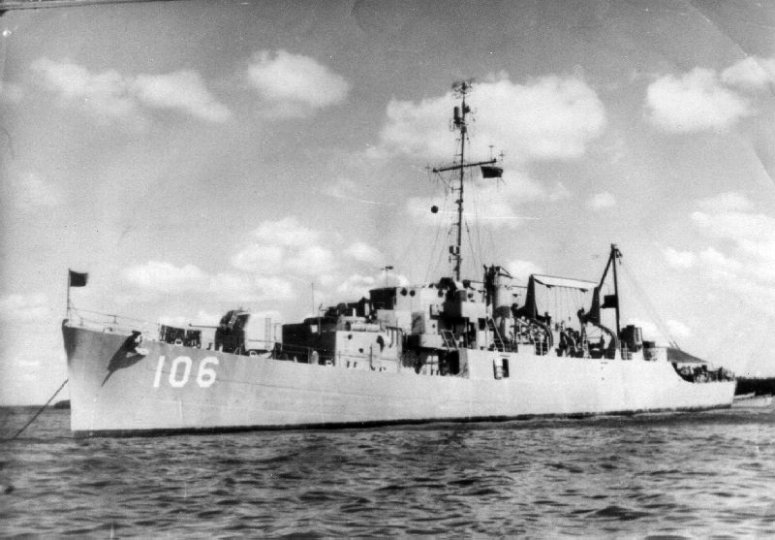

History

United States
- Namesake: Coxswain Walter B. Cobb (1919–1942), United States Navy sailor and Silver Star recipient
- Builder: Bethlehem Shipbuilding Co-Hingham, Massachusetts
- Laid down: 15 January 1944
- Launched: 23 February 1944
- Commissioned: 25 April 1945
- Decommissioned: 29 March 1946
- Reclassified: redesignated APD-106 on 15 July 1944
- Fate: Sunk while under tow, 21 April 1966

History

United States
- Commissioned: 6 February 1951
- Decommissioned: 15 May 1957
- Stricken: 15 January 1966
- Fate: Transferred to the Republic of China, 22 February 1966; sank 21 April 1966 after collision while under tow to Taiwan

General characteristics
- Class & type: Crosley-class high-speed transport
- Displacement: 1,450 tons
- Length: 306 ft (93 m) overall
- Beam: 36 ft 10 in (11.23 m)
- Draft: 13 ft 6 in (4.11 m)
- Propulsion: 2 Combustion Engineering DR boilers; Turbo-electric drive with 2 General Electric steam turbines; 2 solid manganese-bronze 3600 lb. 3-bladed propellers, 8.5 ft. diameter, 7 ft 7-inch pitch; 12,000 hp (8.9 MW); 2 rudders
- Speed: 23 knots (43 km/h)
- Range: 359 tons oil; 3,700 nmi. at 15 knots; 6,000 nmi. at 12 knots
- Troops: 4 LCVPs, 162 troops
- Complement: 204 (12 officers, 192 enlisted)
- Armament: 1 × 5 in (127 mm); 6 × 40 mm (3×2); 6 × 20 mm (6×1); 2 depth charge tracks

USS Walter B. Cobb (APD-106) was a Crosley-class high speed transport of the United States Navy, in service from 1945 to 1946. She was recommissioned from 1951 to 1957. In 1966, she was to be transferred to the Republic of China Navy, but she sank after a collision while under tow to Taiwan on 21 April 1966.

== Namesake ==
Walter Benjamin Cobb was born on 8 September 1919 at Grays, Kentucky. He enlisted in the Navy on 17 November 1937 and attained the rating of coxswain. While assigned to USS Mugford, Cobb served in the crew of that destroyer's number four 5-inch mount. On 7 August 1942, Mugford screened transports unloading troops off Guadalcanal on the first day of the landings. At 14:57 Mugford was attacked by four Japanese Val bombers. A bomb blast blew four men overboard, including Cobb, who was uninjured. After USS Ralph Talbot picked up the four sailors, Cobb volunteered to join the crew of that destroyer's number four gun. On the morning of 9 August in the Battle of Savo Island Ralph Talbot was attacked by three Imperial Japanese Navy ships which hit the American destroyer's number four gun mount, killing Cobb. Cobb was posthumously awarded the Silver Star.

== History ==
=== 1945–1946 ===
Walter B. Cobb (DE-596) was laid down on 15 January 1944 at Hingham, Massachusetts, by the Bethlehem Shipbuilding Corporation. The vessel was launched on 23 February 1944, sponsored by Mrs. Huey Cobb and reclassified as a high-speed transport and redesignated APD-106 on 15 July 1944. The ship was commissioned on 25 April 1945.

Following shakedown in Guantánamo Bay, Cuba, Walter B. Cobb departed Hampton Roads, Virginia, on 24 June, bound for the California coast; emerged from the Panama Canal on 1 July; and arrived at San Diego a week later. She conducted amphibious training exercises out of that port into August, preparing for the assault on the Japanese home islands. Shifting to Oceanside, California, on the 13th, Walter B. Cobb embarked Underwater Demolition Team (UDT) 27. But the following day, 14 August, Japan capitulated, obviating further invasions.

There now remained the occupation of the erstwhile enemy's land. Walter B. Cobb got underway for Japan on the 17th, steamed via Pearl Harbor, and entered Tokyo Bay on 4 September. Her embarked UDT 27 reconnoitered beaches, marked and mapped landing areas, and generally helped to set the stage for the occupation landings in the Tokyo area. The ship then returned, via Guam and Eniwetok, to Pearl Harbor and joined in the massive sealift of demobilized military men, Operation "Magic Carpet."

Walter B, Cobb made a cruise between Pearl Harbor and San Diego before sailing on 30 October 1945 for the Philippines. Proceeding via Guam, she arrived at Manila on 13 November 1945; later touched at Subic Bay, Samar, and Leyte; and made two other visits to Manila before departing the Philippines on 22 January 1946. She sailed to San Pedro, Los Angeles, and thence moved south to the Canal Zone before making port at New York on 9 March. Decommissioned on 29 March 1946, at Green Cove Springs, Florida, the ship was subsequently towed to Mayport, Florida, in April 1948, for berthing. She remained in reserve there until the communist invasion of South Korea in the summer of 1950.

=== 1951–1957 ===
As a result of the U.S. Navy's increased need for ships, Walter B. Cobb was recommissioned on 6 February 1951. The ship conducted shakedown in Guantanamo Bay before engaging in amphibious exercises off Little Creek, Virginia, her new home port. From 1951 to 1954, Walter B. Cobb was homeported at Little Creek, Va., and made two Mediterranean deployments, as well as three midshipmen's cruises—to England and Ireland; to Canada and Cuba; and to Brazil. After landing exercises at Little Creek and at Onslow Beach, North Carolina, Walter B. Cobb got underway from Little Creek on 30 November 1954, bound for the west coast.

Homeported at Long Beach, California, Walter B. Cobb spent her next tour of duty primarily deployed to the Far East—from the spring of 1955 through the summer of 1956. She conducted local operations and exercises out of Yokosuka, Sasebo, and Kure before she returned, via Pearl Harbor, to the west coast of the United States for decommissioning. On 15 May 1957, Walter B. Cobb was placed out of commission and in reserve at the Mare Island Naval Shipyard, Vallejo, California. Her name was struck from the Navy list on 15 January 1966.

=== Fate ===
Sold to Taiwan on 22 February 1966, Walter B. Cobb and USS Gantner (APD-42) were accepted by the Republic of China Navy on 15 March 1966. Taiwan dispatched tug Ta Tung to tandem-tow the two transports to Taiwan. While en route to the western Pacific, the two transports collided on 21 April 1966 and both suffered heavy damage. Gantner was towed to Treasure Island, San Francisco, but Walter B. Cobb listed progressively from 18 to 40 degrees while settling aft. At 2340 on 21 April 1966, Walter B. Cobb filled with water and sank, stern first, in 2,100 fathoms (12,600 feet; 3,800 meters) of water.

== Namesake ==
USS Walter B. Cobb was named after Coxswain Walter B. Cobb (1919–1942), who was posthumously awarded the Silver Star for his gallant service in the Battle of Savo Island aboard USS Mugford (DD-389) and USS Ralph Talbot (DD-390). Cobb was a Pearl Harbor Survivor on USS West Virginia (BB-48). He went on to serve on USS Mugford where, on 7 August 1942, he was blown off the ship during a Japanese aerial attack. Uninjured, he was picked up by USS Ralph Talbot. On 9 August, the Ralph Talbot was hit by a Japanese aerial attack in which Cobb was killed.
