= USS Gantner =

Buckley-class destroyer escort

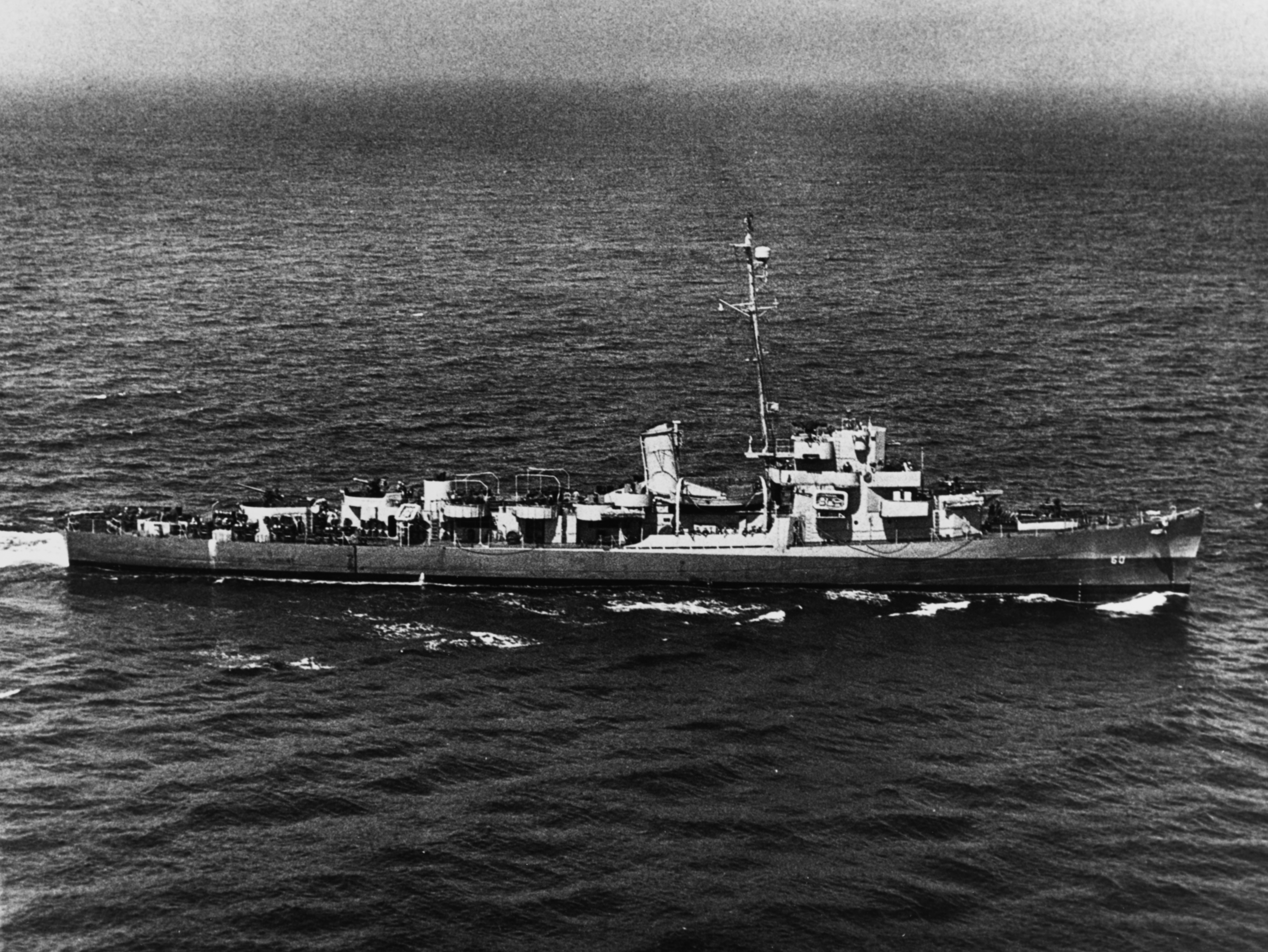

History

United States
- Name: USS Gantner (DE-60)
- Namesake: Samuel Merritt Gantner
- Ordered: 1942
- Builder: Bethlehem Shipbuilding Corporation's Fore River Shipyard in Quincy, Massachusetts
- Laid down: 31 December 1942
- Launched: 17 April 1943
- Commissioned: 23 July 1943
- Reclassified: APD-42, 23 February 1945
- Decommissioned: 2 August 1949
- Stricken: 15 January 1966
- Fate: Transferred to the Republic of China, 22 February 1966

History

Taiwan
- Name: ROCS Wen Shan (DE-34)
- Acquired: 22 February 1966
- Reclassified: PF-34
- Reclassified: PF-834
- Stricken: 1991
- Fate: Broken up, 1992

General characteristics
- Class & type: Buckley-class destroyer escort
- Displacement: 1,400 long tons (1,422 t) light; 1,740 long tons (1,768 t) standard
- Length: 306 ft (93 m)
- Beam: 37 ft (11 m)
- Draft: 9 ft 6 in (2.90 m) standard; 11 ft 3 in (3.43 m) full load
- Propulsion: 2 × boilers; General Electric turbo-electric drive; 12,000 shp (8.9 MW); 2 × solid manganese-bronze 3,600 lb (1,600 kg) 3-bladed propellers, 8 ft 6 in (2.59 m) diameter, 7 ft 7 in (2.31 m) pitch; 2 × rudders; 359 tons fuel oil
- Speed: 23 knots (43 km/h; 26 mph)
- Range: 3,700 nmi (6,900 km) at 15 kn (28 km/h; 17 mph); 6,000 nmi (11,000 km) at 12 kn (22 km/h; 14 mph)
- Complement: 15 officers, 198 men
- Armament: 3 × 3"/50 caliber guns; 1 × quad 1.1"/75 caliber gun; 8 × single 20 mm guns; 1 × triple 21-inch (533 mm) torpedo tubes; 1 × Hedgehog anti-submarine mortar; 8 × K-gun depth charge projectors; 2 × depth charge tracks

USS Gantner (DE-60/APD-42), a Buckley-class destroyer escort of the United States Navy, was named in honor of Boatswain's Mate Samuel Merritt Gantner (1919–1941), who was killed in action during the Japanese attack on the Hawaiian Islands.

Gantner was launched on 17 April 1943 by the Bethlehem Steel Company, Quincy, Massachusetts, sponsored by Mrs. Samuel M. Gantner, widow of Boatswain's Mate Gantner; commissioned at the Boston Navy Yard on 23 July 1943.

== Service history ==
=== World War II, 1943–1945 ===
After shakedown out of Bermuda, Gantner escorted SS George Washington from Puerto Rico to New York, arriving there on 1 December 1943. She departed New York on 26 December 1943 as a part of the escort for a convoy which reached Derry, Northern Ireland on 8 January 1944. She returned to New York on 24 January and by 8 October had made seven more trans-Atlantic escort voyages from that port to Derry.

Following repairs in the Boston Naval Shipyard and battle practice in Casco Bay, Gantner departed Boston on 3 November 1944 escorting fleet tug Pinto (ATF-90) and towing concrete repair dock ARDC-1 to Cristóbal, Canal Zone. She then proceeded to Miami, Florida, to serve as floating school ship in waters extending to the Bahamas and Guantanamo Bay, Cuba. She departed Miami on 19 February 1945 for conversion to a Charles Lawrence-class high speed transport in the New York Naval Shipyard. She was reclassified APD-42 on 23 February 1945.

Gantner departed New York on 14 May 1945 for amphibious warfare landing exercises in the Chesapeake Bay area until 2 June, then proceeded via the Panama Canal and San Diego to Pearl Harbor where she reported for duty with the 5th Amphibious Force, Pacific Fleet, on 28 June. After training Underwater Demolition Teams in Maalea Bay until 3 August, she embarked UDT-3 at San Diego and sailed for the Far East via Hawaii and the Marshall Islands to Japan, entering Tokyo Bay on 4 September. Her frogmen reconnoitered beaches and reported on suitability of landing Army occupation forces at Shiogama Wan and Ominato Ko, Honshū, Japan. From 30 September to 7 October 1945, her swimmers made surveys for the Port Director, Otaru, Hokkaidō with the help of United States Army advance parties ashore.

Gantner departed Tokyo Bay on 12 October 1945 to embark a returning Marine contingent at Apra Harbor, Guam, and sailed thence via the Marshalls and Hawaii to San Diego where she disembarked military passengers on 1 November 1945.

=== 1946–1949 ===
For the next three years she was based at San Diego, largely employed as an amphibious warfare training ship for Marines. From 26 January to 6 March 1946 she made a cruise from San Diego with the 1st Marine Division Reconnaissance Detachment for cold weather maneuvers that took her to Kodiak, Juneau, Tolstoi Bay and Clarence Strait, Alaska. Her amphibious schedule on the California coast was again interrupted on 28 October–18 November 1948 by a cruise northward to act as guard ship on weather and air-sea rescue patrol station for Navy patrol planes scouting north to Seattle, and thence back to San Francisco.

Gantner resumed her amphibious training out of San Diego until 19 January 1949 when she sailed for Shanghai, China. She reached her destination on 14 February and served on station at the Chinese ports of Shanghai, Nanking and Qingdao. Departing the last named port on 7 April, she accompanied the escort carrier Rendova (CVE-114) to Yokosuka, Japan, then sailed via Guam and Pearl Harbor for the west coast, arriving at San Diego on 4 May 1949.

=== Decommissioning and sale to the Republic of China ===
Gantner was decommissioned on 2 August 1949, and was assigned to the San Diego Group, Pacific Reserve Fleet. She was struck from the Navy List on 15 January 1966. On 22 February 1966, Gantner was sold to Nationalist China under the Military Assistance Program.

The ex-Gantner collided on 17 April 1966 with ex-Walter B. Cobb (former APD-106), while both were under tow to Taiwan, resulting in the loss of ex-Walter B. Cobb. Ex-Gantner was commissioned into the Republic of China Navy in May 1966 as frigate Wen Shan (PF-34). With a different hull number, 834, Wen Shan was scrapped in 1991.
