= Koggiung, Alaska =

Coordinates: 58°52′01″N 157°00′27″W

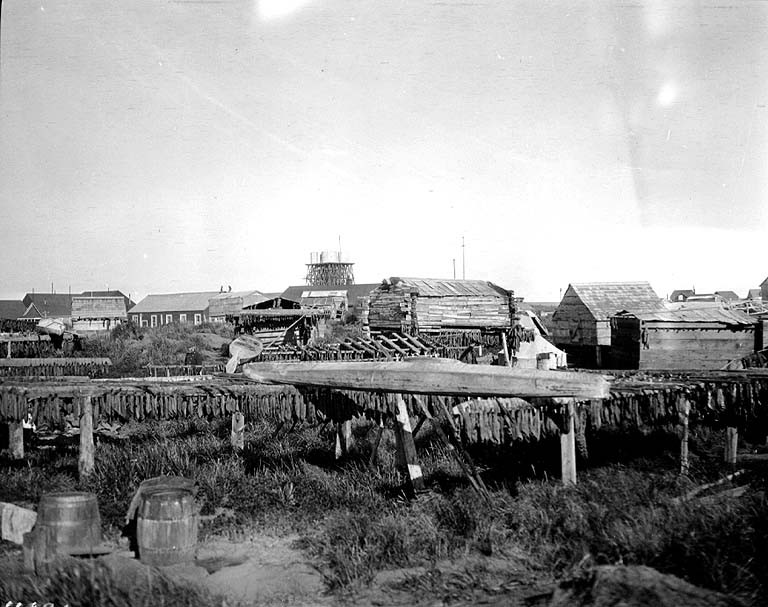
Indigenous village in Koggiung showing bidarkas (animal skin covered kayaks) stored atop racks for drying fish, 1917

Koggiung is a coastal settlement by Kvichak Bay, an arm of Bristol Bay, in Alaska, United States. It has a history of summer gillnet fishing and cannery operations. Graveyard Point is in the area, as is the Koggiung Airport.

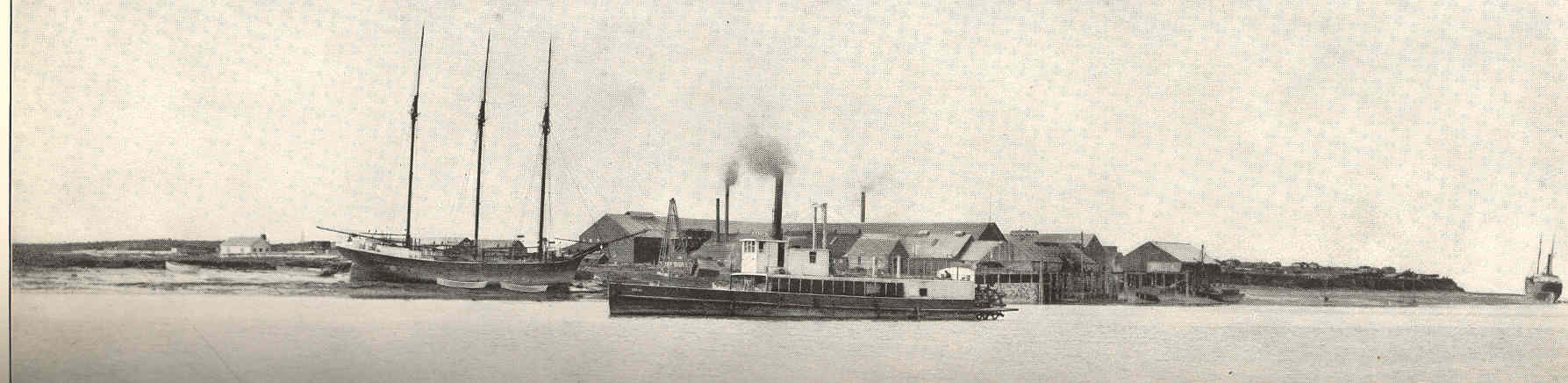
The Point Roberts Packing Company (Alaska Packers Association) canning plant in Koggiung from Kvichak Bay

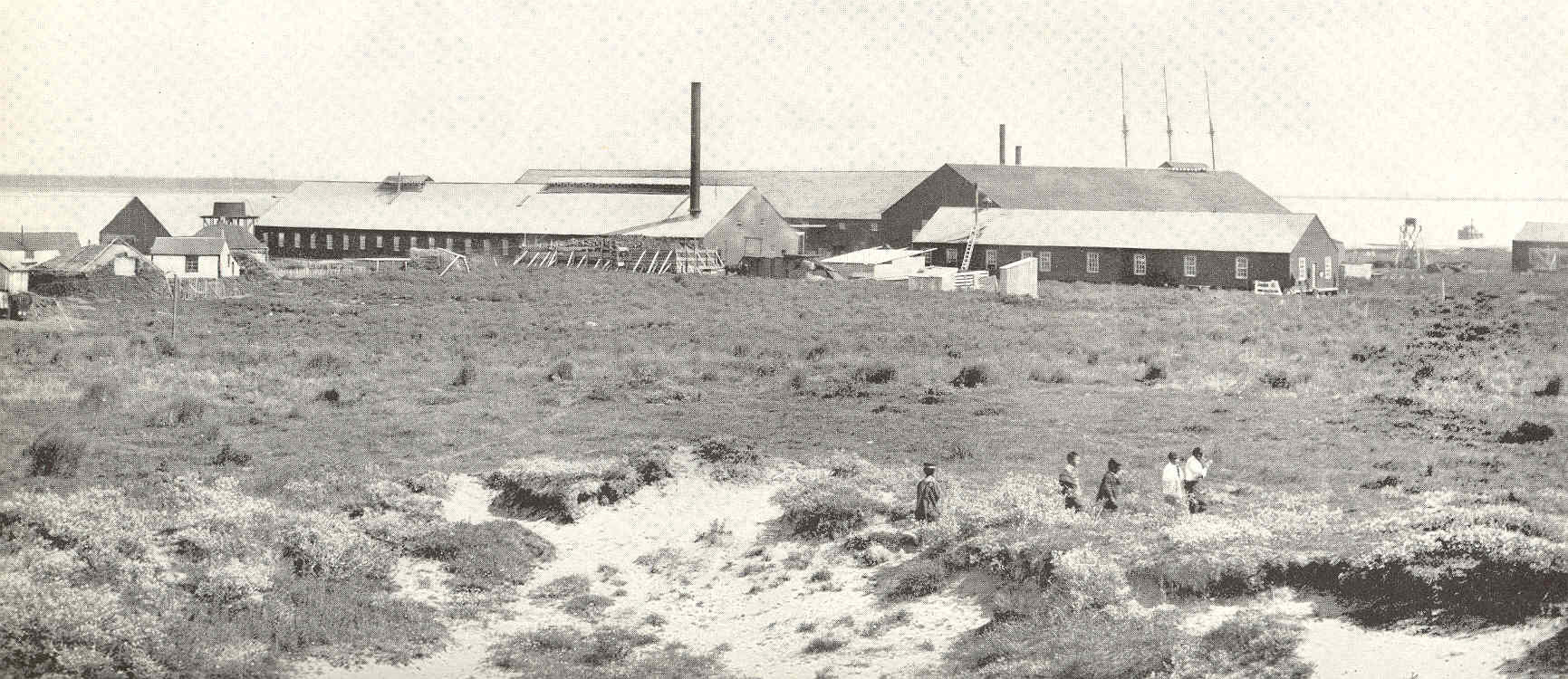
View of Point Roberts Packing Company canning plant

The schooner C.A. Thayer, carrying 28-foot (8.5 m) gillnet boats, bundles of staves for barrels, salt, and a crew of fishermen and cannery workers sailed from San Francisco to Alaska each April from 1912 through 1924. It was anchored at a fishery camp like Squaw Creek or Koggiung, where the fishermen worked their nets and the cannery workers (on the shore) packed the catch.

Each September it returned to San Francisco with supplies of barrels of salted salmon.

In 1909 a reindeer station was formed with a 500-strong herd driven down the Kvichak River to Koggiung. The station was vacated in 1918 after the ash from the 1912 Mount Katmai volcanic eruption caused the deer to starve.

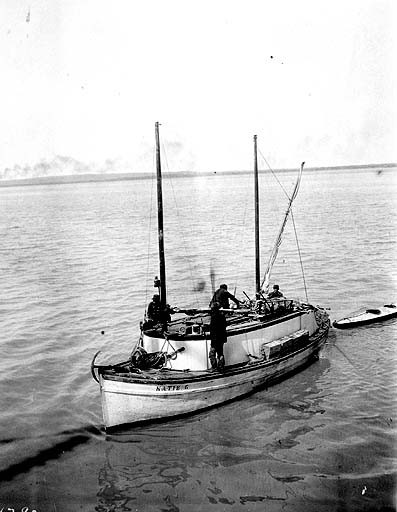
The Katie G at Koggiung, July 1918

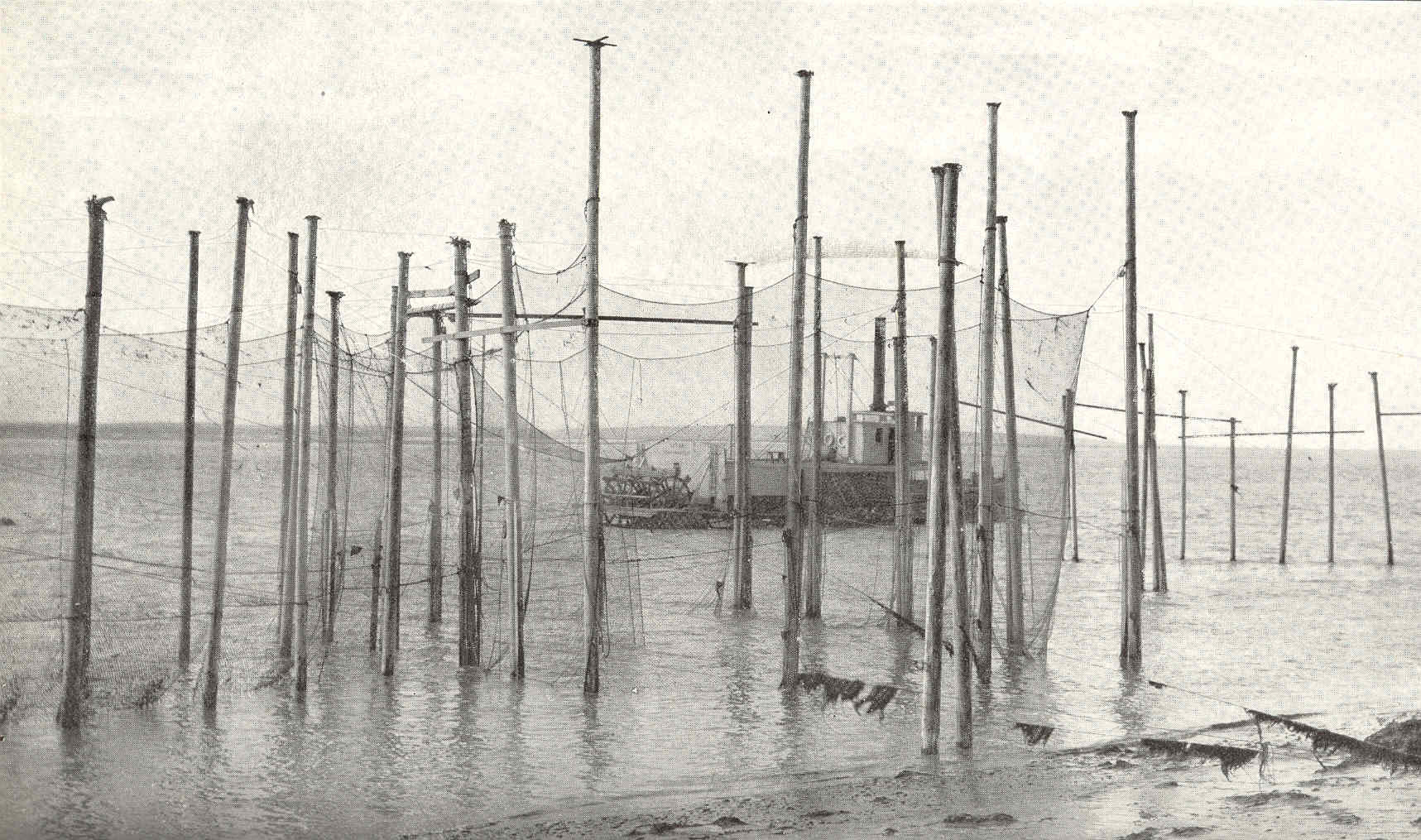
Alaska Packers Association salmon trap near Graveyard Point on Kvichak Bay

The area became a ghost town after the Libby's Graveyard Point, Koggiung cannery closed in 1959. Archival photos of Koggiung remain. It has seen a resurgence of fishing activity and summer fish camping in the 21st century.
