= SS Ljusneälf =

Defunct cargo ship

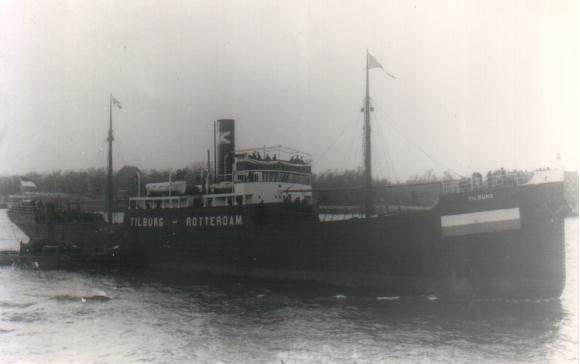
- SS Tilburg

History
- Name: Tilburg (1917-22); Ljusneälf (1922-38); Hubert Schröder (1938-45); Empire Conquest (1945-47); Southern Island (1947-51); Verax (1951-60); Costance (1960-66)
- Owner: NV Nederlandsche Scheepvaart Maatschappij Transatlanta (1917-22); Baltische Reederei (1922-27); August Bolten Wm. Miller's Nachfolger (1927-34); China Rhederi AG (1934-38); Richard Schroder (1938-45); Ministry of War Transport (1945); Ministry of Transport (1945-47); Southern Shipping & Finance Co Ltd (1947-51); Ubaldo Gennari fu Torquato (1951-60); Compagnia de Navigazione Caribbean Cargo Carriers (1960-62); Compagnia de Navigazione Costance (1962-66)
- Operator: B de Booy & L Arij Jansen (1918-20); P W K van den Rope (1920-22); Baltische Reederi (1922-27); August Bolten Wm. Miller's Nachfolger (1927-38); Richard Schroder (1938-45); M Taylor & Co Ltd (1945-47); British & Overseas Minerals Ltd (1947- ); M Kissa (-1951); Ubaldo Gennari fu Torquato (1951-62); Vittorio Morace (1962-66)
- Port of registry: (Netherlands) Rotterdam (1917-22); (Weimar Republic) Hamburg (1922-33); (Nazi Germany) Hamburg (1933-38); (Nazi Germany) Rostock (1938-45); (United Kingdom) London (1945-51); (Italy) Rimini (1951-60); Panama City (1960-66)
- Builder: L Smit & Zoon
- Yard number: 794
- Launched: 1917
- Completed: February 1918
- Out of service: 21 April 1966
- Identification: Code Letters PTNR (1918-22); Code Letters RCNJ (1922-34); Code Letters DHPJ (1934-45); Code Letters GLGC (1945-51); United Kingdom Official Number 180764 (1945-51)
- Fate: Sank

General characteristics
- Type: Cargo ship
- Tonnage: 1,391 GRT; 808 NRT
- Length: 239 ft 1 in (72.87 m)
- Beam: 36 ft 3 in (11.05 m)
- Depth: 16 ft 6 in (5.03 m)
- Installed power: Triple expansion steam engine
- Propulsion: Screw propeller
- Speed: 8 knots (15 km/h)

Ljusneälf was a 1,391 GRT cargo ship that was built in 1917 as Tilburg by L Smit & Zoon, Kinderdijk for Dutch owners. She was sold to German owners in 1922 and renamed Ljusneälf. A sale in 1938 saw her renamed Hubert Schröder. She was seized by the Allies in April 1945, passed to the Ministry of War Transport (MoWT) and renamed Empire Conquest.

In 1947, Empire Conquest was sold into merchant service and renamed Southern Island. In 1951, she was sold to Italian owners and renamed Verax. In 1960, she was sold to Panamanian owners and renamed Costance, serving until 1966 when she ran aground at Lampedusa Island, Italy and was declared a total loss.

== Description ==
The ship was built by L Smit & Zoon, Kinderdijk as yard number 794. She was launched in 1917, and completed in February 1918.

The ship was 239 feet 1 inch (72.87 m) long, with a beam of 36 feet 3 inches (11.05 m) and a depth of 16 feet 6 inches (5.03 m). The ship had a GRT of 1,391 and a NRT of 808.

The ship was propelled by a triple expansion steam engine, which had cylinders of 17 1/2 inches (44 cm), 29 1/4 inches (74 cm) and 46 3/4 inches (119 cm) diameter by 36 inches (91 cm) stroke. The engine was built by Smits. It was supplied by two Scotch boilers which had a heating area of 3,000 square feet (280 m^{2}) and operated at a pressure of 180 pounds per square inch (12.7 kg/cm^{2}). The engine was rated at 900 indicated horsepower (670 kW) and could propel the ship at 8 knots (15 km/h).

== History ==
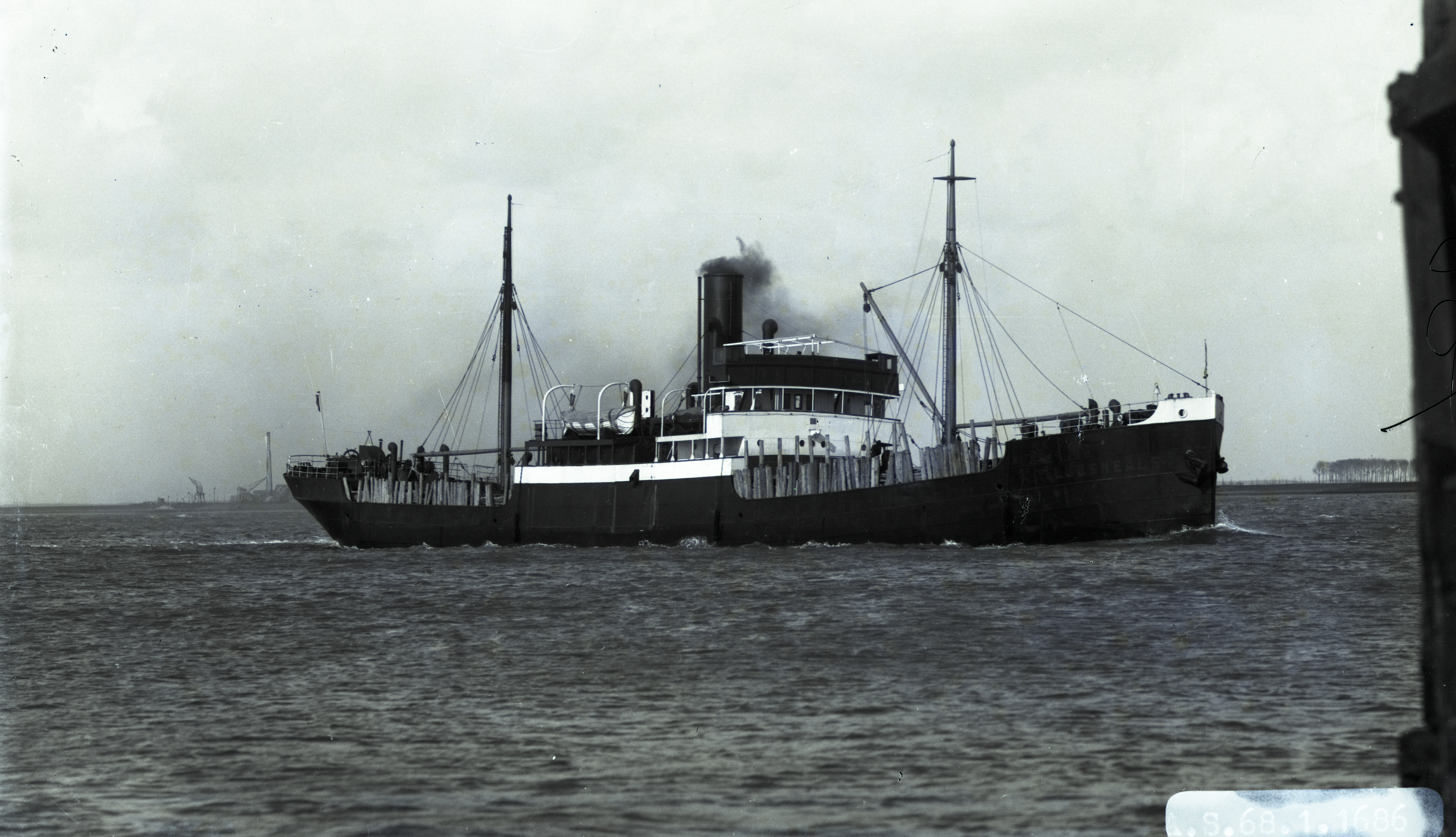
Ljusneälf

Tilburg was built in 1917 for NV Nederlandsche Scheepvaart Maatschappij Transatlanta, Rotterdam. The Code Letters PTNJ were allocated. She was initially operated under the management of B de Booy and L Arij Jansen. In 1920, the management of Tilurg was changed to P W K van den Rope. On 8 November 1922, she was sold to Baltische Reederei, Hamburg and was renamed Ljusneälf ("Ljusnan River"). She was allocated the Code Letters RCNJ. On 15 September 1926, she was sold to August Bolten Wm. Miller's Nachfolger, Hamburg. Ljusneälf served with them until 11 January 1933, when she was sold to China Reederi AG, Hamburg. Her Code Letters were changed to DHPJ. She was then managed by August Bolten. On 20 July 1937, Ljusneälf was sold to Richard Schröder, Rostock. In March 1938, she was renamed Hubert Schröder.

On 9 April 1945, Hubert Schröder was seized by the Allies in the Kaiser Wilhelm Canal. She was passed to the MoWT and renamed Empire Conquest. She was placed under the management of M Taylor. Her port of registry was changed to London. The Code Letters GLGC and United Kingdom Official Number 180764 were allocated. In 1946, Empire Conquest was sold to Southern Shipping & Finance Co Ltd, London and was renamed Southern Island. She was operated under the management of British & Overseas Minerals Ltd, London, and then by M Kissa.

In 1951, Southern Island was sold to Ubaldo Gennari fu Torquato & Co, Rimini, Italy and was renamed Verax (Latin: "truthful"). In 1960, she was sold to Compagnia de Navigazione Caribbean Cargo Carriers, Panama and was renamed Costance, operating under the management of Ubaldo Gerrari fu Torquato & Co. In 1962, she was sold to Compagnia de Navigazione Costance SA, Panama and operated under the management of Vittorio Morace, Naples. On 21 April 1966, Costance was on a voyage in ballast from Naples to Sfax, Tunisia, when she ran aground on Lampedusa Island, Italy, in stormy weather, and subsequently sank.
