= List of United States Navy ships: I–K =

Ships of the United States Navy

Ships in current service
- Current ships

Ships grouped alphabetically
- A–B; C; D–F; G–H; I–K; L; M; N–O; P; Q–R; S; T–V; W–Z

Ships grouped by type
- Aircraft carriers; Airships; Amphibious warfare ships; Auxiliaries; Battlecruisers; Battleships; Cruisers; Destroyers; Destroyer escorts; Destroyer leaders; Escort carriers; Frigates; Hospital ships; Littoral combat ships; Mine warfare vessels; Monitors; Oilers; Patrol vessels; Registered civilian vessels; Sailing frigates; Steam frigates; Steam gunboats; Ships of the line; Sloops of war; Submarines; Torpedo boats; Torpedo retrievers; Unclassified miscellaneous; Yard and district craft

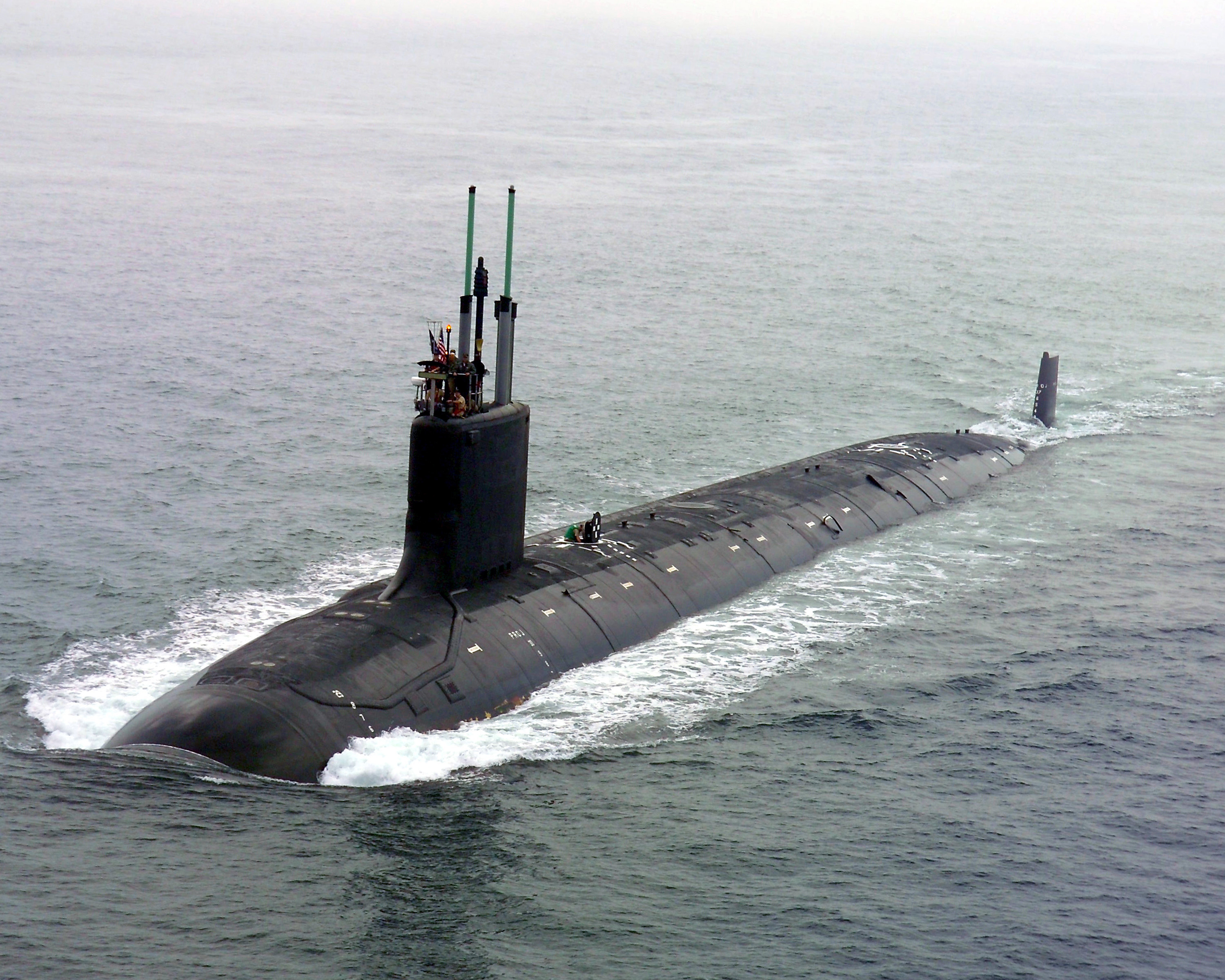
USS Virginia (SSN 774)

This section of the list of United States Navy ships contains all ships of the United States Navy with names beginning with I, J and K.

For a list exclusively of currently commissioned ships, see the List of current ships of the United States Navy.

For ships with unique names, "USS Ship‍name" redirects to the ship article. For reused names, "USS Ship‍name" is an index page for the ships of that name; the links after the name lead to the specific ship pages.

== I ==
- USS I. J. Merritt (ID-3780)

=== Ib-Im ===
- USS Ibex (1863, IX-119)
- USS Ibis (SP-3051, AM-134)
- USS Ice Boat (1861)
- USS Ice King (ID-3160)
- USS Icefish (SS-367)
- USS Ida (1863)
- USS Idaho (1864, BB-24, SP-545, BB-42, SSN-799)
- USS Idalis (SP-270)
- USS Ideal (AMc-85)
- USS Idealia (SP-125)
- USS Idylease (SP-119)
- USS Illinois (1864, BB-7/IX-15, BB-65, SSN-786)
- USS Illusive (AM-243, AM-448/MSO-448)
- USS Imbue (AM-244)
- USS Impeccable (AM-320/MSF-320, T-AGOS-23)
- USS Imperator (ID-4080)
- USS Impervious (AM-245, AM-449/MSO-449)
- USS Impetuous (PC-454/PYc-46)
- USS Implicit (AM-246, AM-455/MSO-455)
- USS Improve (AM-247)
- USS Impulse (PG-68)

=== In ===
- USS Inaugural (AM-242/MSF-242)
- USS Inca (1898, 1911, SP-1212, SP-3219, IX-229)
- USS Incessant (AM-248)
- USS Inch (DE-146)
- USS Inchon (LPH-12/MCS-12)
- USS Incredible (AM-249/MSF-249)
- USS Independence (1776 brig, 1776 sloop, 1814, SP-3676, CV-22/CVL-22, CVA-62/CV-62, LCS-2)
- USS India (1861 stone fleet)
- USS Indian (1906)
- USS Indian Island (AG-77/AKS-25)
- USS Indiana (BB-1, 1898, BB-50, BB-58, SSN-789)
- USS Indianapolis (ID-3865, CA-35, SSN-697, LCS-17)
- USS Indianola (1862)
- USS Indicative (AM-250/MSF-250)
- USS Indien (1778)
- USNS Indomitable (T-AGOS-7)
- USS Indra (ARL-37)
- USS Indus (AKN-1)
- USS Industry (AMc-86)
- USS Inflict (AM-251, AM-456/MSO-456)
- USS Ingersoll (DD-652, DD-990)
- USS Inglis (DE-525)
- USS Ingraham (DD-111/DM-9, DD-444, DD-694, FFG-61)
- USS Inman (DE-526)
- USS Ino (1861)
- USS Instill (AM-252/MSF-252)
- USS Insurgent (1799)
- USS Integrity (BAT-4, T-AGOS-24)
- USS Intelligent Whale (1869)
- USS Intensity (PG-93)
- USS Interceptor (YAGR-8/AGR-8)
- USS Interdictor (YAGR-13/AGR-13)
- USS Interpreter (AGR-14)
- USS Interrupter (AGR-15)
- USS Intrepid (1798, 1874, 1904, CV-11/CVA-11/CVS-11, T-AGOS-17, DDG-145)
- USS Intrigue (AM-253/MSF-253)
- USS Invade (AM-254/MSF-254)
- USS Inver (PG-101)
- USS Investigator (YAGR-9/AGR-9)
- USS Invincible (SP-3671, T-AGOS-10/T-AGM-24)

=== Io-Iz ===
- USS Iolanda (AKS-14)
- USS Iolite (PYc-24, PYc-41)
- USS Iona (YT-107, YT-220/YTB-220/YTM-220)
- USS Ionie (1859)
- USS Ionita (SP-388)
- USS Iosco (1864)
- USS Iowa (1864, BB-4/IX-6, BB-53, BB-61, SSN-797)
- USS Iowan (ID-3002)
- USS Ipswich (PC-1186)
- USS Ira Jeffery (DE-63/APD-44)
- USS Iredell (APA-242)
- USS Iredell County (LST-839)
- USS Irene Forsyte (IX-93)
- USS Irex (SS-482/AGSS-482)
- USS Iris (1847, 1863, 1869, 1885, 1897)
- USS Iro (SP-2679)
- USS Iron Age (1862)
- USS Iron County (LST-840)
- USS Ironsides Jr. (1863)
- USS Ironwood (YN-67)
- USS Iroquois (1859, AT-46)
- USS Irwin (DD-794)
- USS Isaac N. Seymour (1860)
- USS Isaac Smith (1851)
- USS Isabel (SP-521/PY-10)
- USS Isabela (1911, SP-1035)
- USS Isanti (1918, SP-3423)
- USS Isherwood (DD-284, DD-520)
- USS Isilda (1861)
- USS Isis (1902)
- USS Isla de Cuba (1886)
- USS Isla de Luzon (1887)
- USS Island Belle (1861)
- USS Isle of Surry (SP-1860)
- USS Isle Royale (AD-29)
- USS Isonomia (1864)
- USS Israel (DD-98/DM-3)
- USS Itara (YT-391/YTB-391/YTM-391)
- USS Itasca (1861, SP-810)
- USS Itasca II (SP-803)
- USS Itty E (SP-952)
- USS Iuka (1864, AT-37/ATO-37, AT-123/ATA-123, YTB-819)
- USS Ivy (1862, 1904, WAGL-329/WLB-329)
- USS Iwana (YT-2/YTM-2, YT-272)
- USS Iwo Jima (CV-46, LPH-2, LHD-7)
- USS Izard (DD-589)

== J ==
- USS J. A. Palmer (SP-319)
- USS J. Alvah Clark (SP-1248)
- USS J. B. Walker (ID-1272)
- USS J. C. Kuhn (1859)
- USS J. Douglas Blackwood (DE-219)
- USS J. Franklin Bell (AP-34/APA-16)
- USS J. Fred Talbott (DD-156/AG-81)
- USS J. J. Crittenden (1862)
- USS J. M. Guffey (ID-1279)
- USS J. M. Woodworth (YT-137)
- USS J.R.Y. Blakely (DE-140)
- USS J. Reyner & Son (SP-869)
- USS J. Richard Ward (DE-243)
- USS J. W. McAndrew (AP-47)
- USS J. W. Wilder (1859)
- USS J. William Ditter (DD-751/DM-31/MMD-31)
- USS J. William Middendorf (DDG-138)

=== Ja ===
- USS Jacamar (AMc-47, AMCU-25)
- USS Jacana (AMS-193/MSC-193)
- USS Jaccard (DE-355)
- USS Jack (SS-259, SSN-605)
- USS Jack C. Robinson (DE-671/APD-72)
- USS Jack H. Lucas (DDG-125)
- USS Jack Miller (DE-410)
- USS Jack W. Wilke (DE-800)
- USS Jack Williams (FFG-24)
- USS Jackal (1823)
- USS Jackdaw (AMS-21/MSC(O)-21, AM-368, AM-402)
- USS Jackson (LCS-6)
- USS Jacksonville (SSN-699)
- USS Jacob Bell (1842)
- USS Jacob Jones (DD-61, DD-130, DE-130)
- Jacona (YFP-1)
- USS Jade (PY-17)
- USS Jaguar (IX-120)
- USS Jallao (SS-368)
- USS Jamaica (AVG-43/ACV-43/CVE-43)
- USS James Adger (1851)
- USS James C. Owens (DD-776)
- USNS James D. Fairbanks (T-ATS-13)
- USS James E. Craig (DE-201)
- USS James E. Kyes (DD-787)
- USS James E. Robinson (AK-274)
- USS James E. Williams (DDG-95)
- USS James Guthrie (1881)
- USS James H. Clark (SP-759)
- USS James K. Paulding (DD-238)
- USS James K. Polk (SSBN-645/SSN-645)
- USS James L. Davis (1861)
- USS James M. Gilliss (AGS-13/AGSC-13/AMCU-13/MHC-13, T-AGOR-4)
- USS James Madison (1807, SSBN-627)
- USS James Monroe (SSBN-622)
- USS James O'Hara (APA-90/T-AP-179)
- USS James Parker (AP-46)
- USS James River (SP-861, LSM(R)-510)
- USS James S. Chambers (1861)
- USS James Wooley (YT-45)
- USS Jamestown (1844, PG-55/AGP-3, AG-166/AGTR-3)
- USS Jan Van Nassau (1913)
- USS Jane II (SP-1188)
- USS Janssen (DE-396)
- USS Jarrett (FFG-33)
- USS Jarvis (DD-38, DD-393, DD-799)
- USS Jasmine (1863)
- USS Jason (1869, AC-12/AV-2, ARH-1/AR-8)
- USS Jason Dunham (DDG-109)
- USS Jasper (PYc-13, PC-486)
- USS Java (1815)
- USS Jawfish (SS-356)
- USS Jaydee III (SP-692)

=== Je-Ji ===
- USS Jean (ID-1308)
- USS Jean Sands (1863)
- USS Jeannette (1878, SP-149)
- USS Jeannette Skinner (ID-1321)
- MV Jeb Stuart (AK-9204)
- USS Jeff Davis (1862)
- USS Jeffers (DD-621/DMS-27)
- USS Jefferson (1802, 1814, 1833)
- USS Jefferson City (SSN-759)
- USS Jefferson County (LST-845)
- USS Jekyl (AG-135/AKL-6)
- USS Jenkins (DD-42, DD-447/DDE-447)
- USS Jenks (DE-665/APD-67)
- USS Jennings County (LST-846)
- USS Jerauld (APA-174)
- USS Jeremiah Denton (DDG-129)
- USS Jerome County (LST-848)
- USS Jerry Briggs (1918)
- USS Jersey (1776)
- USS Jessamine (1881, SP-438)
- USS Jesse L. Brown (DE-1089/FF-1089/FFT-1089)
- USS Jesse Rutherford (DE-347)
- USS Jet (PYc-20)
- USS Jewell (YFB-22)
- USS Jicarilla (AT-104/ATF-104)
- USS Jimetta (SP-878)
- USS Jimmy Carter (SSN-23)

=== Jo ===
- USS Joanna (SP-1963)
- USS Jobb (DE-707)
- USS John A. Bole (DD-755, DD-783)
- USS John A. Moore (FFG-19)
- USS John Adams (1799, SSBN-620)
- USS John Alexander (1861)
- USS John B. Hinton (SP-485)
- USS John Basilone (DDG-122)
- USS John Blish (AGS-10/AGSC-10)
- USS John C. Butler (DE-339)
- USS John C. Calhoun (SSBN-630)
- USS John C. Stennis (CVN-74)
- USS John Clay (1919)
- USS John Collins (1919)
- USS John D. Edwards (DD-216)
- USS John D. Ford (DD-228/AG-119)
- USS John D. Henley (DD-553)
- USS John Day River (LSM(R)-511)
- USS John Dunkin (1919)
- USS John E. Kilmer (DDG-134)
- USNS John Ericsson (T-AO-194)
- USS John F. Hartley (1874)
- USS John F. Kennedy (CVA-67/CV-67, CVN-79)
- USS John F. Lehman (DDG-137)
- USS John Finn (DDG-113)
- USS John Fitzgerald (1919)
- USS John Francis Burnes (DD-299)
- USS John G. Olsen (SP-2377)
- USNS John Glenn (T-MLP-2)
- USS John Graham (1919)
- USS John Griffith (1861)
- USS John H. Dalton (SSN-808)
- USS John Hancock (1850, DD-981)
- USS John Hood (DD-655)
- USS John J. Powers (DE-528)
- USS John J. Van Buren (DE-753)
- USS John King (DD-953/DDG-953/DDG-3)
- USS John L. Canley (ESB-6)
- USS John L. Clem (AP-36)
- USS John L. Hall (FFG-32)
- USS John L. Lawrence (YT-38)
- USS John L. Lockwood (1854)
- USS John L. Sullivan (YAG-37)
- USS John L. Williamson (DE-370)
- USS John Land (AP-167)
- USNS John Lenthall (T-AO-189)
- USNS John Lewis (T-AO-205)
- USS John M. Bermingham (DE-530)
- USS John M. Connelly (SP-2703)
- USS John M. Howard (IX-75)
- USS John Marshall (YAG-45, SSBN-611/SSN-611)
- USNS John McDonnell (T-AGS-51)
- USS John McHale (1864)
- USS John Mitchell (1864)
- USS John P. Gray (DE-673/APD-74)
- USS John P. Jackson (1860)
- USS John P. Kennedy (1853)
- USS John P. Murtha (LPD-26)
- USS John Paul Jones (DD-932/DDG-32, DDG-53)
- USS John Paul Jr. (1861)
- USS John Penn (AP-51/APA-23)
- USS John Q. Roberts (DE-235/APD-94)
- USS John R. Craig (DD-885)
- USS John R. Perry (DE-1034)
- USS John R. Pierce (DD-753)
- USS John Rodgers (1917, DD-574, DD-983)
- USS John S. McCain (DD-928/DL-3/DDG-36, DDG-56)
- USS John Sealey (SP-568)
- USS John Stevenson (YAG-50)
- USS John W. Crittenden (ID-3224)
- USS John W. Thomason (DD-760)
- USS John W. Weeks (DD-701)
- USS John Warner (SSN-785)
- USS John Willis (DE-1027)
- USS John Young (DD-973)
- USS Johnnie Hutchins (DE-360)
- USS Johnson County (LST-849)
- USS Johnston (DD-557, DD-821)
- USNS Johnstown (AGM-20)
- USS Joint Venture (IX-532)
- USS Jolly Roger (SP-1031)
- USS Jonas Ingram (DD-938)
- USS Jones (1814)
- USS Jonquil (1863, WAGL-330/WLB-330)
- USS Jordan (DE-204)
- USS Joseph Cudahy (ID-1562)
- USS Joseph E. Campbell (DE-70/APD-49)
- USS Joseph E. Connolly (DE-450)
- USS Joseph F. Bellows (SP-323)
- USS Joseph Hewes (AP-50, DE-1078/FF-1078/FFT-1078)
- USS Joseph Holt (1942)
- USS Joseph K. Taussig (DE-1030)
- USS Joseph M. Auman (DE-674/APD-117)
- USS Joseph M. Clark (SP-1244)
- USS Joseph P. Kennedy Jr. (DD-850)
- USS Joseph Strauss (DDG-16)
- USS Joseph T. Dickman (AP-26/APA-13)
- USS Josephine (SP-913, SP-1243, SP-3295)
- USS Josephine H. II (SP-245)
- USS Josephus (SP-3065)
- USS Josephus Daniels (DLG-27/CG-27)
- USS Joshua Humphreys (T-AO-188)
- USNS Joshua L. Goldberg (T-AO-215)
- USS Josiah Willard Gibbs (T-AGOR-1)
- USS Jouett (DD-41, DD-396, DLG-29/CG-29)
- USS Joy (SP-643)
- USS Joy Bright Hancock (FFG-69)
- USS Joyance (SP-72)
- USS Joyce (DE-317/DER-317)

=== Ju ===
- USS Jubilant (AM-255/MSF-255)
- USS Jubilee (1861)
- USS Judge Torrence (1862)
- USS Julia (1812, 1863)
- USS Julia Hamilton (SP-1460)
- USS Julia Luckenbach (ID-2407)
- USS Juliet (1862)
- USS Juliette W. Murray (1918)
- USS Julius A. Furer (DEG-6/FFG-6)
- USS Julius A. Raven (DE-600/APD-110)
- USS Junaluska (YT-176/YTB-176/YTM-176)
- USS Juneau (CL-52, CL-119/CLAA-119, LPD-10)
- USS Juniata (1862, SP-602, IX-77)
- USS Juniata County (LST-850)
- USS Juniper (1864, 1903, YN-15)
- USS Jupiter (AC-3, AK-43/AVS-8, T-AKR-11)
- USS Justice (BATR-20, YP-678)
- USS Justin (1898, IX-228)

== K ==
- USS K-1 (SS-32, SSK-1)
- USS K-2 (SS-33, SSK-2)
- USS K-3 (SS-34, SSK-3)
- USS K-4 (SS-35)
- USS K-5 (SS-36)
- USS K-6 (SS-37)
- USS K-7 (SS-38)
- USS K-8 (SS-39)
- USS K. I. Luckenbach (ID-2291)

=== Ka ===
- USS Kabout (YT-221/YTB-221)
- USS Kadashan Bay (AVG-76/ACV-76/CVE-76/CVU-76/AKV-26)
- USS Kailua (IX-71)
- USS Kaiser Wilhelm II (ID-3004)
- USS Kaiserin Auguste Victoria (1905)
- USS Kaita Bay (AVG-78/ACV-78/CVE-78)
- USS Kajeruna (SP-389)
- USS Kakarna (YTM-393)
- USS Kalamazoo (1863, AOG-30, AOR-6)
- USS Kalinin Bay (AVG-68/ACV-68/CVE-68)
- USS Kalispell (YTB-784)
- USS Kalk (DD-170, DD-611)
- USS Kalmia (1863, AT-23/ATO-23, ATA-184)
- USS Kaloli (AOG-13)
- USS Kamehameha (SSBN-642/SSN-642)
- USS Kamesit (1919)
- USS Kamishak (AVP-44)
- USS Kanaka (YT-151)
- USS Kanalku Bay (CVE-77)
- USS Kanawha (1861, 1896, AO-1, SP-169, AOG-31, T-AO-196)
- USS Kanawha II (SP-130)
- USS Kane (DD-235/APD-18, T-AGS-27)
- USS Kane County (LST-853)
- USS Kangaroo (SP-1284/1917, IX-121)
- USS Kanised (SP-439)
- USS Kankakee (AO-39)
- USS Kansas (1863, BB-21)
- USS Kansas City (CA-128, AOR-3, LCS-22)
- USS Kapvik (YO-155)
- USS Karibou (SP-200)
- USS Karin (AF-33)
- USS Karnes (APA-175)
- USS Kasaan Bay (ACV-69/CVE-69/CVHE-69)
- USS Kaskaskia (AO-27)
- USS Kasota (YT-222/YTB-222/YTM-222)
- USS Katahdin (1861, 1893)
- USS Kate (1864)
- USS Katherine (SP-715)
- USS Katherine K. (SP-220)
- USS Katherine W. Cullen (1903)
- USS Kathrich II (SP-148)
- USS Katie (SP-660)
- USS Katlian (YN-48/YNT-16)
- USS Katrina (SP-1144)
- USS Katrina Luckenbach (ID-3020)
- USS Katydid (SP-95)
- USS Kauffman (FFG-59)
- USS Kaukauna (YTM-749)
- USS Kaula (AG-33)
- USS Kaweah (AO-15)
- USS Kawishiwi (AO-146)

=== Ke ===
- USS Kearny (DD-432)
- USS Kearsarge (1861, BB-5/AB-1, CV-12, CV-33/CVA-33/CVS-33, LHD-3)
- USS Keats (DE-278)
- USS Keith (DE-241)
- USNS Kellar (T-AGS-25)
- USS Kelso (PC-1170)
- USS Kemah (SP-415)
- USS Kemper County (LST-854)
- USS Kempthorne (DE-279)
- USS Kendall C. Campbell (DE-443)
- USS Kendrick (DD-612)
- USS Kenmore (AP-62, AP-162/AK-221)
- USS Kennebago (AO-81/T-AO-81)
- USS Kennebec (1861, AO-36)
- USS Kennedy (DD-306)
- USS Kennesaw (YTB-255)
- USS Kenneth D. Bailey (DE-552, DD-713/DDR-713)
- USS Kenneth L. McNeal (SP-333)
- USS Kenneth M. Willett (DE-354)
- USS Kenneth Whiting (AV-14)
- USS Kennison (DD-138/AG-83)
- USS Kenosha (1867, AK-190)
- USS Kensington (1861, 1862)
- USS Kent (AP-28)
- USS Kent County (LST-855)
- USS Kent Island (AG-78/AKS-26)
- USS Kenton (APA-122)
- USS Kentuckian (ID-1544)
- USS Kentucky (1862, BB-6, BB-66, SSBN-737)
- USS Kenwood (1863, IX-179)
- USS Keokuk (1862, CMc-6/AN-5/CM-8/AKN-4, YTB-771)
- USS Keosanqua (AT-38/ATO-38, ATA-198)
- USS Keosauqua (1864)
- USS Kephart (DE-207/APD-61)
- USS Keppler (DE-311, DE-375, DD-765/DDE-765)
- USS Keresan (ID-1806)
- USS Keresaspa (ID-1484)
- USS Kerkenna (1900)
- USS Kerlew (ID-1325)
- USS Kermanshah (ID-1473)
- USS Kermit Roosevelt (ARG-16)
- USS Kermoor (1907)
- USS Kern (AOG-2/T-AOG-2)
- USS Kerowlee (1901)
- USS Kerrville (PC-597)
- USS Kershaw (APA-176)
- USS Kerstin (AF-34)
- USS Kerwood (ID-1489)
- USS Keshena (YN-37/YNT-5/YTM-731)
- USS Kestrel (AMc-5/IX-175, AMCU-26/MHC-26)
- USS Kestrel II (SP-529)
- USS Ketchikan (YTB-795)
- USS Kete (SS-369)
- USS Kewaunee (PC-1178/PCC-1178, YTM-752)
- USS Kewaydin (1864, 1869, AT-24/ATO-24)
- USS Keweenaw (AVG-44/ACV-44/CVE-44)
- USS Key (DE-348)
- USS Key West (1862, PG-125/PF-17, SSN-722)
- USS Keyport (YF-885)
- USS Keystone State (1853, 1904, T-ACS-1)
- USS Keywadin (1869, AT-24/ATO-24, ATA-213)

=== Kh-Ki ===
- USS Khe Sanh (LHA-5)
- USS Kiamichi (AOG-73)
- USS Kiasutha (YT-463/YTB-463)
- USS Kickapoo (1864, AT-29)
- USS Kidd (DD-661, DD-993/DDG-993, DDG-100)
- USS Kidder (DD-319)
- USS Kilauea (AE-4, AE-26/T-AE-26)
- USS Killarney (SP-219)
- USS Killdeer (AMc-21/IX-194, AMCU-27)
- USS Killen (DD-593)
- USS Killerig (1918)
- RV Kilo Moana (T-AGOR-26) (Operated by the University of Hawaii)
- USS Kilty (DD-137/AG-20/APD-15)
- USS Kimberly (DD-80, DD-521)
- USS Kineo (1861, AT-39)
- USS King (DD-242, DL-10/DLG-10/DDG-41)
- USS King County (LST-857/AG-157)
- USS King Philip (1845)
- USS Kingbird (AMc-56/IX-176, AMS-194/MSC-194)
- USS Kingfish (SS-234)
- USS Kingfisher (1861, SP-76, AM-25/AT-135/ATO-135, MHC-56)
- USS Kingman (AKS-18/APB-47)
- USS Kingsbury (APA-177/LPA-177)
- USS Kingsmill (DE-280)
- USNS Kingsport (T-AG-164)
- USNS Kingsport Victory (T-AK-239)
- USS Kingsville (LCS-36)
- USS Kinkaid (DD-965)
- USS Kinsman (1854)
- USS Kinzer (DE-232/APD-91)
- USS Kiowa (SP-711, ID-1842, AT-72/ATF-72)
- USS Kirk (DE-1087/FF-1087)
- USS Kirkpatrick (DE-318/DER-318)
- USS Kirwin (DE-229/APD-90/LPR-90)
- USS Kishwaukee (AOG-9)
- USS Kiska (AE-35/T-AE-35)
- USS Kite (AM-75, AM-403, AMS-22/MSC(O)-22)
- USS Kitkun Bay (AVG-71/ACV-71/CVE-71)
- USS Kittanning (YTB-787)
- USS Kittatinny (1861)
- USS Kittaton (YT-406/YTB-406/YTM-406)
- USS Kittery (AK-2, PC-1201)
- USS Kittiwake (ASR-13)
- USS Kittson (APA-123)
- USS Kitty Hawk (APV-1/AKV-1, CVA-63/CV-63)

=== Kl-Ky ===
- USS Klakring (FFG-42)
- USS Klamath (1865)
- USS Klaskanine (AOG-63)
- USS Kleinsmith (DE-376, DE-718/APD-134)
- USS Klickitat (AOG-64)
- USS Kline (DE-687/APD-120)
- USS Klondike (AD-22/AR-22)
- USS Knapp (DD-653)
- USS Knave (AM-256/MSF-256)
- USS Knickerbocker (SP-479)
- USS Knight (DD-633/DMS-40)
- RV Knorr (AGOR-15) (Operated by Woods Hole Oceanographic Institution)
- USS Knox (AP-91/APA-46, DE-1052/FF-1052)
- USS Knox Victory (AGM-7)
- USS Knoxville (PG-172/PF-64)
- USS Knudson (DE-591/APD-101/LPR-101)
- USS Kochab (AKS-6)
- USS Kodiak (LSM-161, YF-866)
- USS Koelsch (DE-1049/FF-1049)
- USS Kohi (YAG-27)
- USS Koiner (DE-331/WDE-431/DER-331)
- USS Koka (1865, AT-31, ATA-185)
- USS Koningin der Nederlanden (1911)
- USS Konoka (YT-151/YTM-151/YTB-151)
- USS Kopara (AK-62/AG-50)
- USS Kosciusko (1858)
- USS Kraken (SS-370)
- USS Kretchmer (DE-329/WDE-429/DER-329)
- USS Krishna (ARL-38)
- USS Kroonland (ID-1541)
- USS Kukui (1917, WAK-186)
- USS Kula Gulf (CVE-108/AKV-8)
- USS Kumigan (SP-97)
- USS Kuwana II (SP-594)
- USS Kwajalein (CVE-98/CVU-98/AKV-34)
- USS Kwasind (SP-1233)
- USS Kyle Carpenter (DDG-148)
- USS Kyne (DE-744)
