= USS Itasca =

USS Itasca or USS Itasca II has been the name of more than one United States Navy ship, and may refer to:

- USS Itasca (1861), a steamer in commission from 1861 to 1865
- USS Itasca (SP-810), later USS SP-810, a patrol boat employed as a hospital boat in commission from 1917 to 1919
- USS Itasca II (SP-803), a patrol boat in commission from 1918 to 1919
