= USS Kestrel =

USS Kestrel or USS Kestrel II has been the name of more than one United States Navy ship, and may refer to:

- USS Kestrel II (SP-529), a patrol vessel in commission from 1917 to 1919
- USS Kestrel (AMC-5), a minesweeper in commission from 1941 to 1945
- USS Kestrel (AMCU-26), a minesweeper in commission from 1954 to 1957
