= USS Juniata =

USS Juniata has been the name of more than one United States Navy ship, and may refer to:

- USS Juniata (1862), a sloop-of-war in commission from 1862 to 1867, from 1869 to 1872, from 1873 to 1876, and from 1882 to 1889
- USS Juniata (SP-602), a patrol vessel in commission from 1917 to 1918
- USS Juniata (IX-77), a schooner in service from 1942 to 1945

== See also ==
- USS LST-850, a tank landing ship in commission from 1944 to 1947, renamed USS Juniata County (LST-850) in 1955 while in reserve
