= USS Keith =

USS Keith may refer to the following ships of the United States Navy:

- USS Keith (DE-241), a United States Navy destroyer escort in commission from 1943 to 1946
- USS Willard Keith, the name of more than one United States Navy ship
