= USS Jeannette =

Two ships of the United States Navy have borne the name USS Jeannette:

- USS Jeannette (1878), was formerly a Royal Navy gunboat HMS Pandora, launched in 1861, purchased by the US Navy in 1878 for an expedition to the North Pole, and sunk in 1881 in the Arctic Ocean
- USS Jeannette (SP-149), was launched in 1905, acquired by the US Navy in 1917 for service as a patrol craft during World War I, and sold in 1920

== See also ==
- USS Jeannette Skinner (ID-1321)
- Jeannette (disambiguation)
