= USS Kalmia =

USS Kalmia may refer to the following ships of the United States Navy:

- USS Kalmia (1863), was a screw steamer built as Innes 1863 and purchased by the US Navy the same year and sold 25 October 1865
- USS Kalmia (AT-23) was laid down 23 August 1918 and sold 21 January 1947
- USS Kalmia (ATA-184), was laid down as ATR-111 on 27 July 1944 and sold to Columbia in 1978
