= USS Joy =

USS Joy has been the name of more than one United States Navy ship, and may refer to:

- USS Joy (SP-643), a patrol vessel in commission from 1917 to 1918
- USS Joy (DD-951), the original name of a destroyer renamed USS Turner Joy (DD-951) in 1957 while under construction
