= USS James H. Clark =

Tugboat of the United States Navy

History

United States
- Name: USS James H. Clark
- Namesake: Previous name retained
- Completed: 1900
- Acquired: 19 July 1917
- Commissioned: 21 August 1917
- Decommissioned: April 1920
- Fate: Sold 16 May 1921
- Notes: Operated as commercial tug James H. Clark 1900-1917

General characteristics
- Type: Patrol vessel
- Tonnage: 45 Gross register tons
- Length: 60 ft 8 in (18.49 m)
- Beam: 17 ft 3 in (5.26 m)
- Draft: 6 ft 9 in (2.06 m) or 8 ft (2.4 m)
- Propulsion: One 150-indicated horsepower (112-kilowatt) vertical compound steam engine, one marine leg boiler, one shaft
- Speed: 8.5 or 9 knots
- Armament: 1 × 3-pounder gun

USS James H. Clark (SP-759) was a United States Navy tug in commission from 1917 to 1920.

James H. Clark was built as a commercial steam tug of the same name in 1900 at Buffalo, New York. On 19 July 1917, the U.S. Navy acquired her from her owner, the Tampa Towing & Lighterage Company of Tampa, Florida, for use during World War I. Assigned the section patrol number 759, she was commissioned on 21 August 1917 as USS James H. Clark (SP-759).

Assigned to the 7th Naval District and based at Key West, Florida, James H. Clark performed towing and other miscellaneous duties in the harbor at Key West and at Naval Station Key West until 1920.

James H. Clark was decommissioned on 6 April 1920 and was sold on 16 May 1921 to the A. C. Tuxbury Lumber Company of Charleston, South Carolina.
