= USS Iona =

Two ships have borne the name Iona for the US Navy, both tugboats:

- USS Iona (YT-107) a district harbor tug captured from Spain at Cavite Navy Yard, Philippines 1898, later destroyed by the Japanese on 3 January 1942.
- USS Iona (YTB-220) a wooden tug originally classified YT-220, serving from 1944 until her accidental sinking in 1963.
