= USS Karibou =

Patrol vessel of the United States Navy

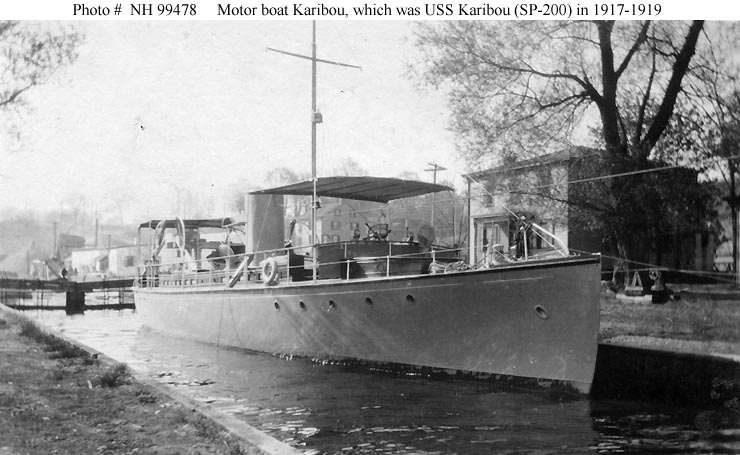
- Karibou in civilian use prior to her U.S. Navy service.

History

United States
- Name: USS Karibou
- Namesake: Previous name retained
- Builder: Salisbury Marine Construction Company, Salibsury, Maryland.
- Completed: 1911 or 1913
- Acquired: 17 May 1917
- Commissioned: 18 May 1917
- Decommissioned: 5 February 1919
- Fate: Returned to owner 5 February 1919
- Notes: Operated as civilian motorboat Lebanon and Karibou 1911-1917

General characteristics
- Type: Patrol vessel
- Tonnage: 25 tons
- Length: 65 ft 6 in (19.96 m)
- Beam: 12 ft 5 in (3.78 m)
- Draft: 4 ft 6 in (1.37 m)
- Speed: 10 knots
- Complement: 7
- Armament: 1 × 1-pounder gun

USS Karibou (SP-200) was a United States Navy patrol vessel in commission from 1917 to 1919.

Karibou was built as the civilian motorboat Lebanon in either 1911 or 1913 by the Salisbury Marine Construction Company at Salibsury, Maryland. She later was renamed Karibou.

The U.S. Navy chartered Karibou from her owner, Harwood Spencer of Asheville, North Carolina, on 17 May 1917 for World War I service as a patrol vessel. She was commissioned as USS Karibou (SP-200) on 18 May 1917.

Assigned to the 5th Naval District at Norfolk, Virginia, Karibou served as an armed guard patrol craft in the harbors of Norfolk and Newport News, Virginia. She acted as a mail and dispatch boat along the lower reaches of the James River and the York River and patrolled Atlantic coastal waters from Norfolk to Virginia Beach, Virginia.

Karibou was decommissioned on 5 February 1919, and was returned to her former owner the same day.
