= USS Inflict =

USS Inflict may refer to the following ships of the United States Navy:

- USS Inflict (AM-251), was launched 16 January 1944 and transferred to the Maritime Commission on 8 October 1948
- USS Inflict (AM-456), was launched 16 October 1953 and sold for scrap in December 1992
