= USS Jack =

USS Jack has been the name of more than one United States Navy ship, and may refer to:

- USS Jack (SS-259), a submarine in commission from 1943 to 1946 and from 1957 to 1958
- USS Jack (SSN-605), a submarine in commission from 1967 to 1990
