= USS Kittaton =

Tugboat of the United States Navy

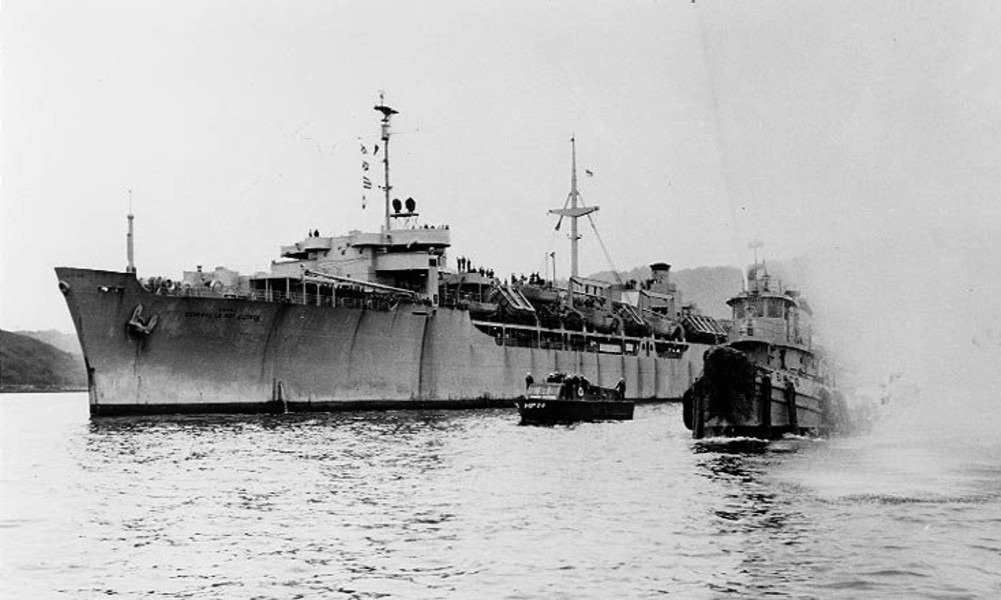
- USS Kittaton (at right) escorting USNS General LeRoy Eltinge (T-AP-154)

History

United States
- Name: Kittaton
- Namesake: A creek in Virginia named for a Native American word meaning "the great town or village."
- Ordered: as YT-406
- Builder: Ira Bushey & Sons, Inc., Brooklyn, New York
- Laid down: date unknown
- Launched: 30 June 1944
- Acquired: by the U.S. Navy in December 1944
- In service: 19 January 1945 as Kittaton (YTB-406)
- Out of service: date unknown
- Reclassified: Harbor Tug, Large YTB-406, 15 May 1944; District Harbor Tug, Medium YTM-406 in February 1962
- Stricken: date unknown
- Identification: IMO number: 8853568
- Honours and awards: World War II Victory Medal
- Fate: Sold for scrapping, 23 April 1987

General characteristics
- Type: Sassaba-class district harbor tug
- Displacement: 238 tons
- Length: 100 ft (30 m)
- Beam: 25 ft (7.6 m)
- Draft: 9 ft 7 in (2.92 m)
- Propulsion: Diesel, single screw
- Speed: 12 knots
- Complement: not known
- Armament: none

USS Kittaton (YT-406 / YTB-406 / YTM-406) was a Sassaba-class district harbor tug that served the U.S. Navy at the end of World War II. She served in the Pacific Ocean, often in the Japan and Philippine Islands area and was eventually struck from the Navy list at an unspecified date.

== Built in Brooklyn, New York ==
Kittaton (YTB-406) was laid down as YT-406; re-classified YTB-406 on 15 May 1944; launched 30 June 1944, by Ira Bushey & Sons, Inc., Brooklyn, New York; and placed in service 19 January 1945.

== World War II-related service ==
Assigned to duty in the Pacific Ocean theatre of operations, Kittaton joined Task Force 16 at Pearl Harbor 21 May. Departing 2 days later, she steamed via Kwajalein and arrived Guam in June for towing operations out of Apra Harbor.

== Post-war service ==
Kittaton served at Guam and in the western Pacific until February 1947 when she was assigned to further duty with Service Force, Pacific Fleet. Reclassified YTM-406 in February 1962, Kittaton in 1967 remained on active service with the U.S. Pacific Fleet out of U.S. Naval Base Subic Bay, Philippine Islands.

== Deactivation ==
Kittaton was decommissioned and struck by the Navy at an undisclosed date. She was sold for scrapping on 23 April 1987.

== Honors and awards ==
Qualified Kittaton personnel are eligible for the following:

- American Campaign Medal
- Asiatic-Pacific Campaign Medal
- World War II Victory Medal
- National Defense Service Medal
