= USS Kenwood =

USS Kenwood may refer to the following ships of the United States Navy:

- USS Kenwood (1863), was a stern wheel steamer launched 3 April 1863 and sold 17 August 1865
- USS Kenwood (IX-179), was an oiler chartered by the US Navy on 16 November 1944 and sold for scrap 3 March 1948
