= USS K-2 =

The name USS K-2 may refer to the following ships of the United States Navy:

- USS K-2 (SS-33), a K-class submarine, originally named Cachalot
- USS K-2 (SSK-2), a Barracuda-class submarine, later renamed Bass
