= USS Jacamar =

USS Jacamar may refer to the following ships of the United States Navy:

- USS Jacamar (AMc-47), was a wooden-hulled coastal minesweeper launched 10 March 1941 and sold in 1947
- USS Jacamar (AMCU-25) was launched as LSIL-870 on 2 October 1944, and renamed Jacamar 7 March 1952
