= USS J. B. Walker =

Collier of the United States Navy

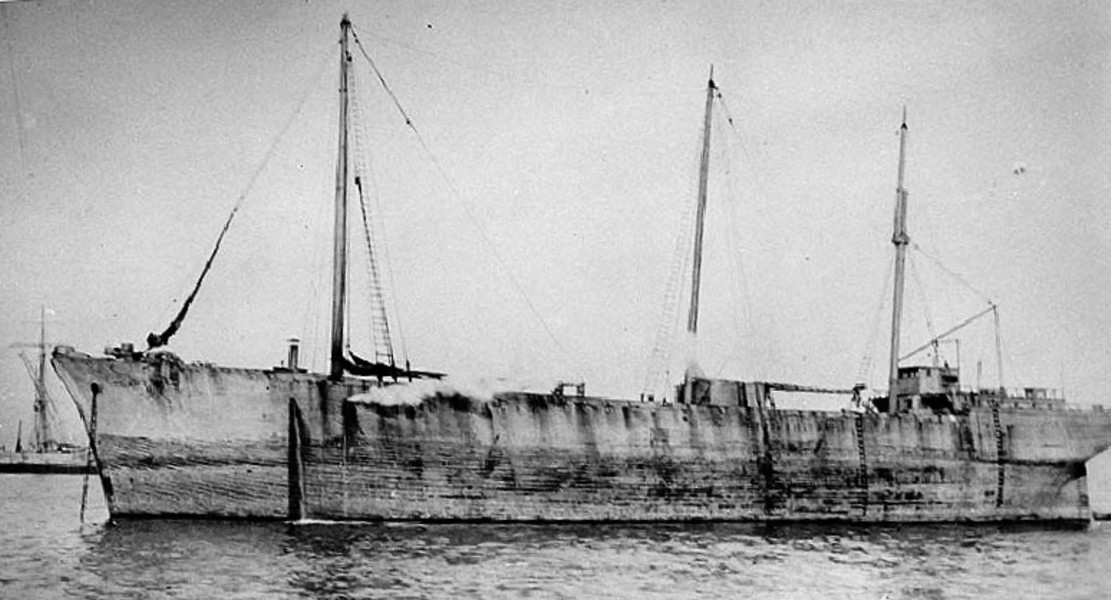
- J.B. Walker (American Seagoing Barge, 1879)

History

United States
- Name: USS J. B. Walker
- Builder: E. O'Brien Co., Thomaston, Maine
- Laid down: date unknown
- Launched: 1879
- Completed: 1879
- Acquired: 8 August 1918
- Commissioned: 8 August 1918 as USS J.B. Walker (ID # 1272)
- Decommissioned: 27 March 1919
- Stricken: 1919
- Home port: Norfolk, Virginia
- Fate: Sold, 11 September 1919

General characteristics
- Type: Schooner
- Displacement: 2136 gross ton
- Length: 247 ft (75 m)
- Beam: 42 ft 4 in (12.90 m)
- Draft: 26 ft 9 in (8.15 m)
- Propulsion: none
- Speed: non-self propelled
- Crew: crew of 6
- Armament: none

USS J. B. Walker (ID 1272) was an old schooner hulk acquired by the U.S. Navy during World War I. Because of her age, condition and relatively large cargo capacity, she was used as a collier, carrying coal where needed. She was not self-propelled, and required to be towed from one port to another. Post-war, J. B. Walker was sold.

== Built in Maine in 1879 ==
J.B. Walker, a 2,136 gross ton seagoing barge, was built at Thomaston, Maine, in 1879 as a schooner. She sank, or struck a submerged obstruction and was beached, near Great Round Shoals, Nantucket, Massachusetts on 29 July 1916. Later raised, or refloated, and taken to Providence, Rhode Island. After operating commercially for nearly four decades, she was taken over by the U.S. Navy in October 1917 and placed in commission as USS J.B. Walker (ID # 1272) in August 1918.

== World War I service ==
For the rest of World War I, and for some months after the November 1918 Armistice, she was employed carrying coal between Norfolk, Virginia, and New England. In late March 1919 J.B. Walker was assigned to the Fifth Naval District, probably for harbor service in the vicinity of Norfolk and Hampton Roads. She was sold in September 1919. Her later fate is unknown.

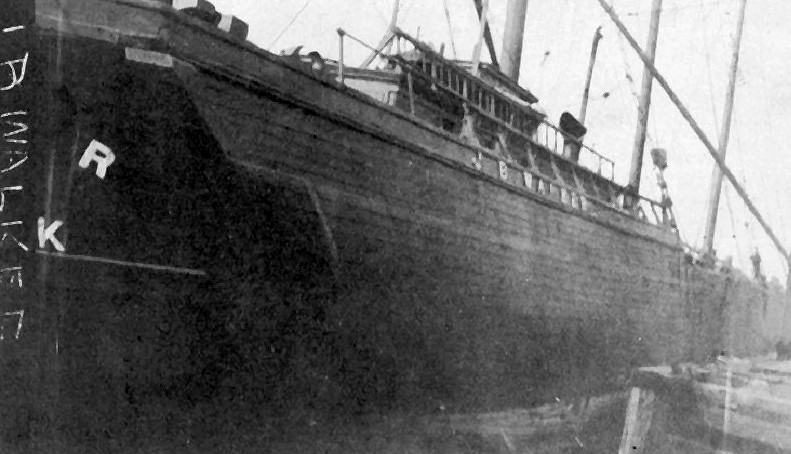
J.B. Walker in port, probably in the New York City area in 1917-1918
