= USS Impervious =

USS Impervious may refer to the following ships of the United States Navy:

- The construction of Impervious (AM-245) was canceled on 6 June 1944
- USS Impervious (AM-449), was a minesweeper launched 29 August 1952 and decommissioned 12 December 1991
