= USS Iuka (1864) =

Gunboat of the United States Navy

History

United States
- Acquired: 8 March 1864
- Commissioned: 23 May 1864
- Decommissioned: 22 June 1865
- Fate: Sold, 1 August 1865

General characteristics
- Displacement: 944 tons
- Length: 200 ft (61 m)
- Beam: 31 ft 6 in (9.60 m)
- Draught: 20 ft (6.1 m)
- Propulsion: steam engine; screw-propelled
- Speed: 12 knots (22 km/h; 14 mph)
- Complement: 116
- Armament: one 20-pound Parrott rifle; one heavy 12-pounder gun; one light 12-pounder gun; one 24-pounder gun

USS Iuka, originally named Commodore, was a steamer acquired by the Union Navy during the American Civil War. She was used by the Navy to patrol navigable waterways of the Confederacy to prevent the South from trading with other countries.

== Service history ==
Iuka was purchased as Commodore 8 March 1864 from George Griswold of New York City. She prepared for service at the New York Navy Yard and commissioned 23 May 1864, Acting Volunteer Lt. W. C. Rogers in command. Departing New York City 7 June, Iuka joined the East Gulf Blockading Squadron at Key West, Florida. For the remainder of the war she performed blockade duty cruising in the Gulf of Mexico. This service was briefly interrupted in October 1864 when Iuka escorted a prize steamer from Key West to Boston, Massachusetts, and then returned to the Gulf. On 31 March 1865 she captured the English schooner Comus sailing from St. Marks, Florida, to Havana, Cuba, with a cargo of contraband cotton. After the war Iuka departed Key West 2 June 1865 and reached Boston 12 June. She decommissioned there 22 June and was sold at public auction to Arthur Leary 1 August 1865.
