= USS Iuka (ATA-123) =

Tugboat of the United States Navy

History

United States
- Name: Iuka
- Builder: Levingston Shipbuilding Co., Orange, Texas
- Laid down: 21 November 1942
- Launched: 20 December 1942
- Commissioned: 30 June 1943
- Decommissioned: 26 November 1947
- Reclassified: Auxiliary Fleet Tug ATA-123, 15 May 1944
- Identification: IMO number: 7942233
- Fate: Sold to a commercial interest

General characteristics
- Class & type: Sotoyomo-class tugboat
- Displacement: 534 t.(lt) 835 t.(fl)
- Length: 143 ft (44 m)
- Beam: 33 ft (10 m)
- Draft: 13 ft (4.0 m)
- Propulsion: diesel-electric engines, single screw
- Speed: 13 knots (24 km/h; 15 mph)
- Complement: 45
- Armament: one single 3 in (76 mm) dual purpose gun mount

USS Iuka (ATA-123) was laid down by Levingston Shipbuilding Co., Orange, Texas, on 21 November 1942. The ship was launched on 20 December 1942 and commissioned on 30 June 1943.

After a brief period of duties out of Norfolk, Virginia, ATR-45 sailed for the Pacific, reaching Espiritu Santo, New Hebrides, via the Panama Canal and Bora Bora, Society Islands, late in October. For the duration of war the fleet tug remained in the South Pacific islands, operating primarily at Espiritu Santo, to tow targets and barges as well as handle other harbor duties. ATR-45 was reclassified ATA-123 15 May 1944.

The ocean tug returned Pearl Harbor 7 September 1945 and from there set course for San Francisco. She performed harbor duties along the California coast until she decommissioned at San Pedro and went into reserve 26 November 1947. While berthed with the Columbia River Group, Pacific Reserve Fleet, ATA-123 was named Iuka 16 July 1948. She remained in the Pacific Reserve until September 1960 when she was transferred to the Maritime Administration. In September 1962 Iuka entered the National Defense Reserve Fleet at Olympia, Washington, until she was sold in 1976.
