= USS Ibex =

USS Ibex may refer to the following ships of the United States Navy:

- USS Ibex (1863), was a side-wheel gunboat formerly named Ohio Valley purchased by the US Navy on 10 December 1864 and sold 17 August 1865
- USS Ibex (IX-119), was acquired by the US Navy 13 December 1943 and returned to the Maritime Commission 28 June 1946
