= USS Joyance =

Patrol vessel of the United States Navy

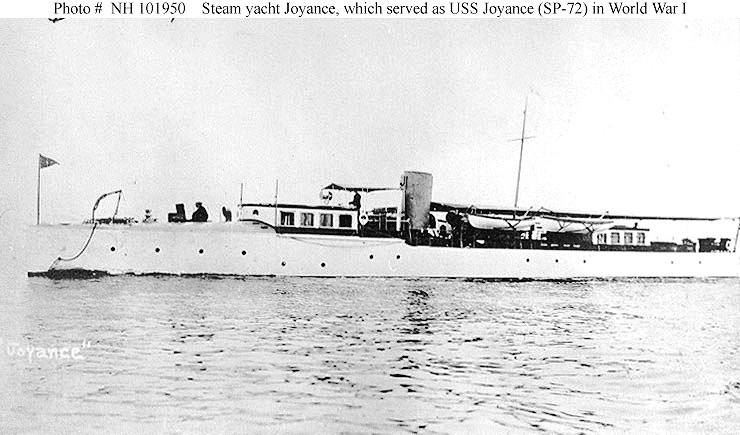
- Steam yacht Joyance displays her torpedo boat-like appearance

History

United States
- Name: USS Joyance
- Namesake: Previous name retained
- Port of registry: New York
- Builder: Robert Jacobs, City Island, Bronx
- Completed: 1907
- Acquired: May 1917
- Commissioned: 20 July 1917
- Decommissioned: 6 May 1919
- Fate: Sold 5 August 1919
- Notes: In use as private steam yacht Cavalier and Joyance 1907–1917

General characteristics
- Type: Patrol vessel
- Tonnage: 119 GRT, 80 NRT
- Length: 134.3 ft (40.9 m)
- Beam: 16.0 ft (4.9 m)
- Draft: 5 ft 6 in (1.68 m)
- Depth: 8.2 ft (2.5 m)
- Installed power: 22 NHP
- Propulsion: 1 × triple-expansion engine; 1 × screw
- Speed: 14 kn (26 km/h)
- Armament: 1 × 3-pounder gun

USS Joyance (SP-72) was an armed yacht that served in the United States Navy as a patrol vessel from 1917 to 1919.

Joyance was built as the private steam yacht Cavalier in 1907 by Robert Jacobs at City Island, New York. By the time the US Navy inspected her for possible World War I service — describing her as being of "light construction"—she had been renamed Joyance. The Navy acquired her in May 1917 and commissioned her on 20 July 1917 as USS Joyance (SP-72).

Joyance was assigned to the 3rd Naval District as a harbor patrol boat, and operated in New York Harbor and Long Island Sound during World War I.

Joyance was decommissioned on 6 May 1919 and sold to Reinhard Hall at Brooklyn, New York, on 5 August 1919.
