= USS Kingbird (AMS-194) =

Minesweeper of the United States Navy

History

United States
- Name: Kingbird
- Namesake: Kingbird
- Builder: Mare Island Naval Shipyard, Vallejo, California
- Laid down: 26 February 1954
- Launched: 21 May 1954
- Commissioned: 27 April 1955
- Reclassified: Coastal Minesweeper, 7 February 1955
- Stricken: 1 July 1972
- Identification: Hull symbol: AMS-194; Hull symbol: MSC-194
- Fate: Sold for scrap, 1 March 1973

General characteristics
- Class & type: Bluebird-class minesweeper
- Displacement: 290 long tons (290 t)
- Length: 144 ft 3 in (43.97 m)
- Beam: 28 ft (8.5 m)
- Draft: 9 ft (2.7 m)
- Installed power: 4 × Packard 600 hp (450 kW) diesel engines; 2,400 hp (1,800 kW)
- Propulsion: 2 × screws
- Speed: 13 kn (24 km/h; 15 mph)
- Complement: 39
- Armament: 2 × 20 mm (0.8 in) Oerlikon cannons anti-aircraft (AA) mounts

USS Kingbird (AMS-194) was a Bluebird-class minesweeper acquired by the United States Navy for clearing coastal minefields.

== Construction ==
The second ship to be named Kingbird was laid down 26 February 1954, as AMS-194; launched 21 May 1954 by the Quincy Adams Yacht Yard, Inc., Quincy, Massachusetts; sponsored by Mrs. Marion Cushman Wilson; reclassified MSC-194 on 7 February 1955; and commissioned on 27 April 1955.

== East Coast operations ==
After shakedown, Kingbird arrived Charleston, South Carolina, for minesweep training and for the entire year she perfected methods of detecting and destroying mines. She also participated in exercises which kept her ready for any service she might be called upon to perform. From 1956 through 1964, Kingbird engaged in minesweeping exercises along the Atlantic coast from Nova Scotia to the Panama Canal Zone in the Caribbean. During 1965, she displayed her versatility in two search operations: one for a downed Navy plane and the other a lost merchant ship. In 1967, she still operated out of Charleston.

== Decommissioning ==
Kingbird was struck from the Navy Register on 1 July 1972, and disposed of through the Defense Reutilization and Marketing Service for scrap, 1 March 1973.

== Notes ==
Citations

== Bibliography ==
Online resources

- "Kingbird II (MSC-194)". Dictionary of American Naval Fighting Ships. Naval History and Heritage Command. 28 July 2015. This article incorporates text from this source, which is in the public domain.
- "USS Kingbird (MSC-194)". NavSource.
