= USS Illusive =

USS Illusive may refer to the following ships of the United States Navy:

- The construction of Illusive (AM-243) was canceled on 6 June 1944
- USS Illusive (AM-448), was a minesweeper launched 12 July 1952 and decommissioned 30 March 1990
