= USS Kimberly =

There have been two ships in the United States Navy named USS Kimberly, both named after Lewis Ashfield Kimberly:

- USS Kimberly (DD-80), was a Wickes-class destroyer from 1918 to 1922
- USS Kimberly (DD-521), was a Fletcher-class destroyer from 1943 to 1954
