= USS Kanised =

Patrol vessel of the United States Navy

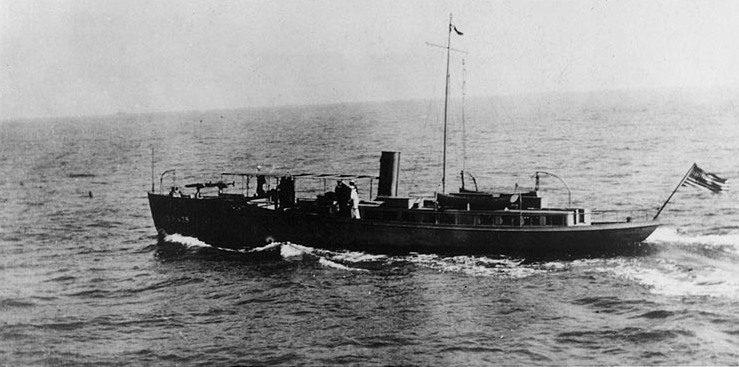
- USS Kanised (SP-439) during World War I, possibly photographed from USS Iowa (Battleship No. 4)

History

United States
- Name: USS Kanised
- Namesake: Previous name retained
- Completed: 1909 or 1910
- Acquired: 8 May 1917
- Commissioned: 12 May 1917
- Stricken: 31 March 1919
- Fate: Sold 13 December 1919
- Notes: Operated as private motor yacht Tuscanola, Nahmeoka, and Kanised 1910-1917

General characteristics
- Type: Patrol vessel
- Tonnage: 61 gross register tons
- Length: 100 ft (30 m)
- Beam: 17 ft 6 in (5.33 m)
- Draft: 7 ft 7 in (2.31 m)
- Propulsion: Gasoline engine, one shaft
- Speed: 12 knots
- Armament: 2 × 1-pounder guns

USS Kanised (SP-439) was a United States Navy patrol vessel in commission from 1917 to 1919.

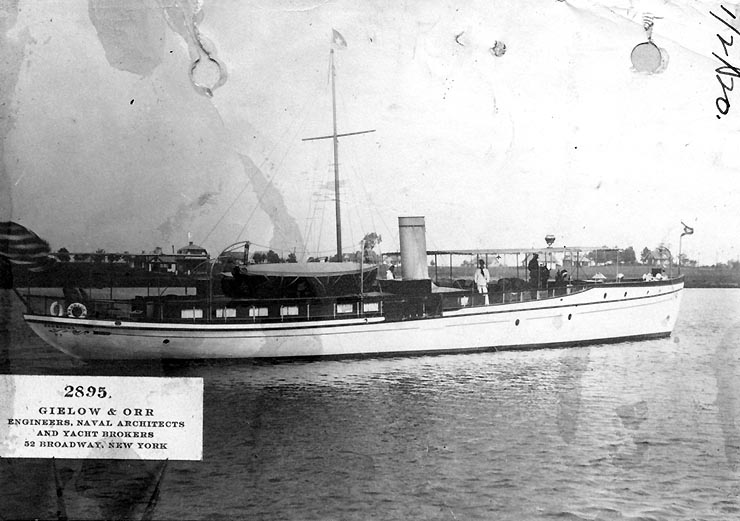
Kanised before World War I as the private motor yacht Nahmeoka.

Kanised was built as the private motor yacht Tuscanola in 1909 or 1910 at Long Branch, New Jersey. She later was renamed Nahmeoka and then Kanised.

On 8 May 1917, the U.S. Navy acquired Kanised from her owner, Louis Kann of Baltimore, Maryland, for use as a section patrol vessel during World War I. She was commissioned as USS Kanised (SP-439) on 12 May 1917.

Assigned to the 5th Naval District at Norfolk, Virginia, Kanised operated in the Hampton Roads, Virginia, area for the rest of World War I. She served as a mail ship, on harbor patrol, and as flagship of Squadron 4 on the section patrol.

After World War I ended on 11 November 1918, Kanised remained at Norfolk, where she was stricken from the Navy List on 31 March 1919 and sold on 13 December 1919 to J. A. Mickelson of Morris Heights, the Bronx, New York.
