= USS K-1 =

The name USS K-1 may refer to the following ships of the United States Navy:

- USS K-1 (SS-32), the lead vessel of the K-class submarines, originally named Haddock
- USS K-1 (SSK-1), the lead vessel of the Barracuda-class submarines, later renamed Barracuda
