= USS J. W. Wilder =

Tender of the United States Navy

History

United States
- Acquired: 19 May 1863
- Captured: 20 January 1862

General characteristics
- Propulsion: sail

USS J. W. Wilder was a schooner captured by the Union Navy during the American Civil War. She was used by the Union Navy as a tender in support of the Union Navy blockade of Confederate waterways.

== Service history ==
J. W. Wilder was a British schooner captured about 15 miles east of Mobile Bay entrance 20 January 1862 by Union screw steamer USS R. R. Cuyler. She was condemned and sold to the Navy by the New York City prize court 19 May 1863. J. W. Wilder used as a tender to ordnance ship Sportsman by the West Gulf Blockading Squadron.
