= USS Jason =

Three ships of the United States Navy have been named USS Jason, after Jason of Greek mythology:

- USS Jason (1862), was a Passaic-class monitor originally named Sangamon that served in the Spanish–American War under the name Jason and was decommissioned in 1899
- USS Jason (AC-12), was a collier commissioned 26 June 1913 and performed cargo and fueling duties during World War I and was decommissioned 30 June 1932
- USS Jason (AR-8), was a Vulcan-class repair ship commissioned 19 June 1944 and operated as a floating shipyard throughout World War II and the Korean War then decommissioned in 1995
