= USS Kittery =

USS Kittery may refer to the following ships of the United States Navy:

- USS Kittery (AK-2), was launched as the German transport Praesident on 30 November 1905, taken over by the US Navy on 14 May 1917 and scrapped in 1937
- USS Kittery (PC-1201), was launched as PC-1201 on 14 February 1943, renamed Kittery on 15 February 1956 and sold on 9 October 1959
