= USS Kingman =

Barracks ship

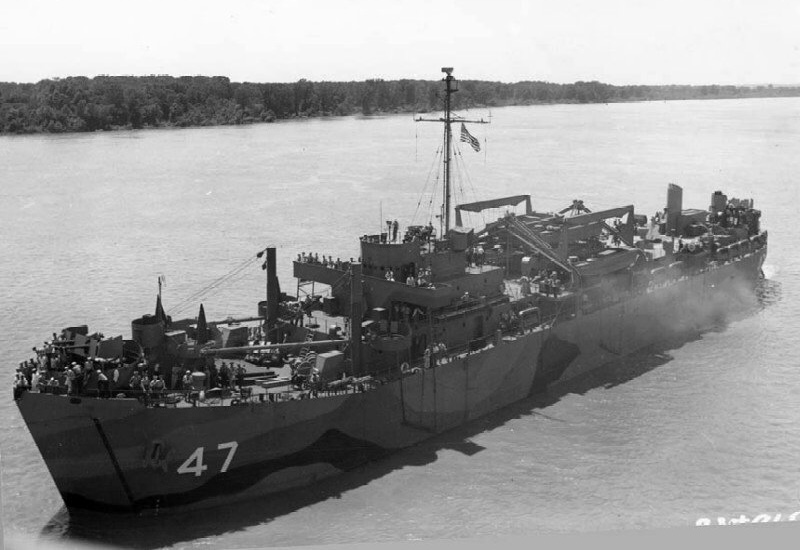
- USS Kingman

History

United States
- Name: Kingman
- Namesake: Kingman County, Kansas
- Builder: Missouri Valley Bridge and Iron Co.
- Laid down: 8 January 1945
- Launched: 17 April 1945
- Commissioned: 27 June 1945
- Decommissioned: 15 January 1947
- Stricken: 1 October 1977
- Identification: APB-47
- Fate: Sold for scrapping, 19 November 1980
- Notes: Ship International Radio Callsign: NDBD

General characteristics
- Class & type: Benewah-class barracks ship
- Displacement: 4,000 tons
- Length: 328 ft (100 m)
- Beam: 50 ft (15 m)
- Draft: 11 ft 2 in (3.40 m)
- Propulsion: General Motors 12-567A Diesel engines
- Speed: 12 knots (22 km/h; 14 mph)
- Complement: 28 officers, 275 enlisted
- Armament: Two quad 40 mm gun mounts

USS Kingman (APB-47) was a self-propelled barracks ship in service with the United States Navy during World War II, and briefly post-war. Laid down as LST-1113, she was then reclassified AKS-18 and named Kingman on 8 December 1944. She was then again reclassified APB-47 on 3 March 1945, and launched on 17 April 1945 by Missouri Valley Bridge & Iron Co., sponsored by Mrs. K. B. Bragg. Kingman shortly after, sailed to be fitted out in New Orleans, Louisiana, and commissioned on 27 June 1945.

== Ship history ==
After her shakedown cruise in the Gulf of Mexico, Kingman cleared Gulfport, Mississippi, and steamed westward through the Panama Canal. She arrived at Pearl Harbor on 2 September, the day of Japan's historic surrender. Five days later the barracks ship sailed for the Far East, arriving at Sasebo, Japan on 8 October via Eniwetok and Guam. She remained in Japanese ports for 5 months, before loading America-bound troops and departing Sasebo on 16 March 1946.

Kingman arrived at San Diego, California on 29 April and remained there until she was decommissioned on 15 January 1947. She was assigned to the Pacific Reserve Fleet shortly after her decommissioning. She was struck from the Naval Register on 1 October 1977, after 30 years of being laid up, and was sold for scrapping, on 19 November 1980, to Levin Metals Corp. (PD-X-1034 of 6 October 1980) for $450,000.00, as part of a two ship group sale. She was scrapped in 1980.

During World War II, Kingman was assigned to the Asiatic-Pacific Theater.

== Ship awards ==
- American Campaign Medal
- World War II Victory Medal
- Asiatic-Pacific Campaign Medal
