= USS Kathrich II =

Patrol vessel of the United States Navy

History

United States
- Name: USS Kathrich II
- Namesake: Previous name retained
- Builder: E. S. Thibault, Jacksonville, Florida
- Completed: 1913
- Acquired: 8 May 1917
- Commissioned: 9 May 1917
- Decommissioned: 6 February 1919
- Fate: Transferred to United States Coast Guard 4 September 1919
- Notes: Operated as private motorboat Kathrich II 1913-1917

General characteristics
- Type: Patrol vessel
- Tonnage: 12 tons
- Length: 40 ft (12 m)
- Beam: 10 ft (3.0 m)
- Draft: 4 ft (1.2 m)
- Speed: 9 knots
- Armament: None

USS Kathrich II (SP-148) was a motorboat that served in the United States Navy as a patrol vessel from 1917 to 1919.

Kathrich II was built as a civilian motorboat in 1913 by E. S. Thibault at Jacksonville, Florida. The U.S. Navy acquired her in 1917 from her owner, Richard B. Marks of Jacksonville, for use as a patrol vessel during World War I. She was enrolled in the Naval Coast Defense Reserve on 20 April 1917; the Navy took control of her on 8 May 1917 and commissioned her on 9 May 1917 at Charleston, South Carolina, as USS Kathrich II (SP-148).

Kathrich II was assigned to the 6th Naval District, where she operated as a section patrol boat in the harbor at Savannah, Georgia, boarding and inspecting ships and sealing radios.

On 5 February 1919, Kathrich II was assigned to the Naval Overseas Transportation Service (NOTS) for duty as a dispatch and radio inspection ship in Savannah harbor. Decommissioned on 6 February 1919, she remained with NOTS until 4 September 1919, when she was turned over to the United States Coast Guard for use in communications work.
