= USS Impeccable =

USS Impeccable is a name used more than once by the U.S. Navy:

- USS Impeccable (AM-320), a World War II fleet minesweeper.
- USNS Impeccable (T-AGOS-23), an ocean surveillance vessel placed into service on 22 March 2001.
