= USS King =

USS King can refer to the following ships of the United States Navy:

- USS King (DD-242) was a Clemson-class destroyer during World War II.
- USS King (DDG-41) was a Farragut-class destroyer during the Cold War.
