= USS Kalk =

USS Kalk was the name of several American vessels. It may refer to:

- USS Kalk (DD-170), was a Wickes-class destroyer laid down as Rodgers on 4 March 1917; renamed Kalk 23 December 1918; transferred to the Royal Navy 23 September 1940; transferred to the Royal Canadian Navy in June 1941 and finally scrapped in 1945
- USS Kalk (DD-254) was renamed Rogers 23 December 1918
- USS Kalk (DD-611), was a Benson-class destroyer laid down 30 June 1941 and sunk as a target in March 1969
