= Iuka (YTB-819) =

Tugboat of the United States Navy

History

United States
- Awarded: 9 August 1971
- Builder: Marinette Marine
- Laid down: 20 September 1972
- Launched: 12 April 1973
- Acquired: 17 May 1973
- In service: 1973
- Out of service: 1995
- Stricken: 19 October 1995
- Fate: Transferred to Other Government Agency 21 March 1996

General characteristics
- Class & type: Natick-class large harbor tug
- Displacement: 286 long tons (291 t) (light); 346 long tons (352 t) (full)
- Length: 108 ft (33 m)
- Beam: 29 ft (8.8 m)
- Draft: 14 ft (4.3 m)
- Propulsion: One diesel propulsion engine, 2000 HP
- Speed: 12 knots (14 mph; 22 km/h)
- Complement: 12
- Armament: None

Iuka (YTB-819) was a United States Navy Natick-class large harbor tug.

== Construction ==
The contract for Iuka was awarded 9 August 1971. She was laid down on 20 September 1972 at Marinette, Wisconsin, by Marinette Marine and launched 12 April 1973.

== Operational history ==
Stricken from the Navy List 19 October 1995, Iuka was transferred to Other Government Agency 21 March 1996.

Was used as a training vessel for the Seamanship program at Tongue Point Job Corps Center, Astoria, OR until January 2022. Transferred to Pacific Defense Supply for Military Training, January 2022.
