= USS Ionita =

Patrol vessel of the United States Navy

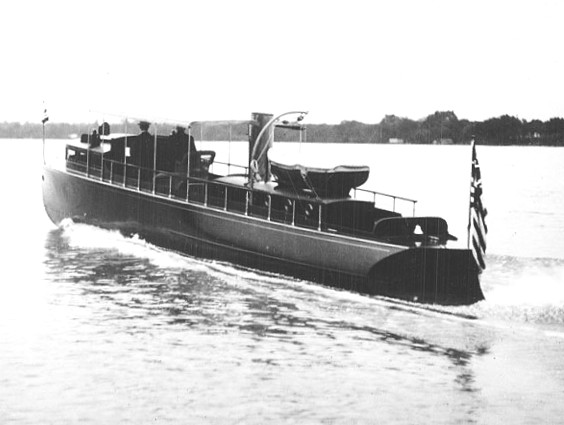
- Ionita (U.S. Motor Boat, 1914) underway circa 1914-17, probably in the vicinity of Detroit, Michigan.

History

United States
- Name: USS Ionita
- Namesake: A former name retained
- Owner: R. A. Newman of Detroit, Michigan
- Builder: Church Boat Works, Trenton, Michigan
- Laid down: date unknown
- Launched: date unknown
- Completed: in 1914
- Acquired: by the Navy 16 August 1917
- Commissioned: 23 September 1917 as USS Ionita (SP-388)
- Stricken: 1919 (est.)
- Home port: Detroit, Michigan
- Fate: Sold 20 November 1919

General characteristics
- Type: Yacht
- Length: 55 ft (17 m)
- Beam: 8 ft (2.4 m)
- Draft: 2 ft 2 in (0.66 m)
- Propulsion: not known
- Speed: 19 knots
- Complement: 5
- Armament: not known

USS Ionita (SP-388) was a yacht acquired by the U.S. Navy during World War I. Ionita was outfitted by the Navy as a patrol craft and reported to the Commander, 9th Naval District, headquartered at Lake Bluff, Illinois. Ionita patrolled the Detroit River and was struck by the Navy at war's end.

== Built in Detroit, Michigan ==
Ionita (SP-388), a 55-foot-long motor yacht, was built by Church Boat Works, Trenton, Michigan, in 1914 for use as a pleasure craft on the Great Lakes. She was acquired by the Navy from her owner, R. A. Newman of Detroit, Michigan, 16 August 1917; and commissioned as USS Ionita (SP-388) 23 September 1917.

== World War I service ==
Ionita was assigned to the 9th Naval District as a section patrol craft and spent the war on patrol in the Detroit River.

== Post-war service ==
After the World War I Armistice, she was transferred to the Naval Training Camp, Detroit, Michigan.

== Decommissioning ==
Ionita was later decommissioned by the Navy and was sold to William Thewes, Cleveland, Ohio, on 20 November 1919.
