= USS Kineo =

USS Kineo may refer to the following ships of the United States Navy:

- USS Kineo (1861), an ironclad gunboat launched 9 October 1861 and sold 9 October 1866
- USS Kineo (AT-39), renamed Montcalm on 24 February 1919
