= USS Jasmine =

Tugboat of the United States Navy

History

United States
- Ordered: as Peter B. Van Houten
- Laid down: date unknown
- Launched: date unknown
- Acquired: 29 May 1863
- Commissioned: 17 June 1863
- Decommissioned: 12 May 1866
- Stricken: 1866 (est.)
- Fate: Sold, 13 June 1866

General characteristics
- Displacement: 120 tons
- Length: 79 ft (24 m)
- Beam: 18 ft 3 in (5.56 m)
- Draught: 7 ft 6 in (2.29 m)
- Propulsion: steam engine; screw-propelled
- Speed: not known
- Complement: 19
- Armament: one 20-pounder Parrott rifle; one 12-pounder howitzer

USS Jasmine was a steam tugboat acquired by the Union Navy during the American Civil War. She was used by the Union Navy as an armed tugboat in support of the Union Navy blockade of Confederate waterways.

== Service history ==
Jasmine, a wooden tug, was purchased at New York City under the name Peter B. Van Houten from Palmer, Crary, & John Reid, 29 May 1863; and commissioned at New York Navy Yard 17 June.

Jasmine was assigned to the West Gulf Blockading Squadron and sailed for the Gulf of Mexico 21 June. On 14 July she captured sloop Relampago with an assorted cargo, including supplies of critical copper boiler tubing, and towed her to Key West, Florida. For the remainder of the war the tug served as a supply and dispatch vessel maintaining communications between the various ships of the squadron. The end of the war found her in Pensacola, Florida, where she remained providing varied services while the squadron demobilized and the Navy resumed peacetime operations.

Jasmine sailed north early in 1866 and decommissioned at New York City 12 May. She was sold to the U.S. Treasury Department 13 June 1866, and subsequently served with the Lighthouse Board as USLHS Jasmine. In 1873, she was transferred to the United States Revenue Cutter Service and was renamed USRC William E. Chandler. She was sold in 1903.
