= USS Killdeer =

USS Killdeer may refer to one of the following United States Navy ships:

- USS Killdeer (AMc-21), originally the fishing vessel Vindicator; acquired by the Navy as a coastal minesweeper and renamed in 1940; renamed IX-194 and used as general utility vessel after 1944; struck in 1945 and sold in 1946
- USS Killdeer (AMCU-27), originally LCI(L)-883; renamed and reclassified 7 March 1952, but refit cancelled 1 July 1954; sold in 1960
