= USS Kewaydin =

USS Kewaydin may refer to:

- Kewaydin, a Java-class screw frigate, was laid down at Boston Navy Yard in 1864. but her hull was never completed. Renamed Pennsylvania 15 May 1869, she was broken up in 1884
- USS Kewaydin (1869), formally the Kickapoo was renamed Keywadin on 10 August 1869. Some texts publish this ship under the name Kewaydin
- USS Kewaydin (AT-24), was a tugboat, commissioned on 4 November 1919 and decommissioned 10 December 1945
