= USS Kabout =

Tugboat of the United States Navy

History

United States
- Name: USS Kabout (YTB-221)
- Builder: Elizabeth City Shipyard, Elizabeth City, NC
- Launched: December 1943
- Sponsored by: Mrs. J. C. Fegan
- In service: 3 July 1944
- Reclassified: reclassified YTB-221 on 15 May 1944
- Stricken: 1 May 1959
- Fate: Sold to Ships, Inc., Norfolk, Va., 7 August 1959

General characteristics
- Class & type: Cahto-class district harbor tug
- Displacement: 410 long tons (417 t)
- Length: 110 ft 0 in (33.53 m)
- Beam: 27 ft 0 in (8.23 m)
- Draft: 11 ft 4 in (3.45 m)
- Speed: 12 knots (22 km/h; 14 mph)
- Complement: 12
- Armament: 2 × .50-caliber machine guns

Kabout was laid down as YT-221; launched December 1943 by the Elizabeth City Shipyard, Elizabeth City, NC; sponsored by Mrs. J. C. Fegan; and reclassified YTB-221 on 15 May 1944 prior to being placed in service 3 July for duty in the 5th Naval District. She remained in operation there until 1 May 1959 when she was struck from the Navy List. She was sold to Ships, Inc., Norfolk, VA, 7 August 1959.
