= USS Keystone State =

USS Keystone State may refer to the following ships operated by the United States Navy:

- USS Keystone State (1853), was a wooden side wheel steamer purchased by the US Navy 10 June 1861 and sold at auction 15 September 1865
- USS Keystone State (1904), was the former sloop-of-war St. Louis renamed Keystone State on 30 November 1904
- SS Keystone State (T-ACS-1), is an auxiliary crane ship launched in 1965 and currently in service
