= USS Jasper =

Patrol vessel of the United States Navy

History

United States
- Name: Stranger
- Owner: Fred E. Lewis
- Builder: Lake Union Dry Dock Company, Seattle, Washington
- Completed: 1938
- Fate: Acquired by the Navy 1 July 1941

History

United States
- Name: Jasper
- Namesake: Jasper
- Acquired: 1 July 1941
- Commissioned: 8 July 1941
- Out of service: 14 August 1947
- Stricken: 11 December 1944
- Identification: Hull symbol: PYc-13; Code letters: NBRC
- Fate: Transferred to the United States Maritime Commission for disposal in June 1948

General characteristics
- Class & type: patrol boat
- Displacement: 395 long tons (401 t)
- Length: 134 ft (41 m)
- Beam: 23 ft 10 in (7.26 m)
- Draft: 16 ft 6 in (5.03 m)
- Installed power: 2 × Washington diesel engines; 800 shp (600 kW)
- Propulsion: 2 × screws
- Speed: 12 kn (14 mph; 22 km/h)
- Complement: 98
- Armament: 2 × 3 in (76 mm)/50 caliber gun

USS Jasper (PYc-13) was a coastal patrol yacht in the service of the United States Navy. She was named for the gemstone Jasper.

The first Jasper (PYc-13), a diesel-powered yacht, was built as Stranger by Lake Union Dry Dock Co., Seattle, Washington, in 1938; purchased 1 July 1941, from her owner, Fred E. Lewis; renamed Jasper; and placed in service at San Diego, California, 8 July 1941.

== World War II service ==
After the installation of experimental sound and electronic equipment, Jasper was assigned to the 11th Naval District to perform research work at the Naval Sound Laboratory, San Diego. She continued this important scientific work throughout the war taking part in experiments with radio and sound waves in cooperation with the University of California, Division of War Research. Echo-ranging equipment on board Jasper was used in 1946, to discover a deep 300-mile-wide oceanic layer off the coast of California.

The ship was placed out of service 14 August 1947, at San Diego and turned over to the United States Maritime Commission for disposal in June 1948.
