= USS Implicit =

USS Implicit may refer to the following ships of the United States Navy:

- USS Implicit (AM-246), was a minesweeper launched 6 September 1943 and transferred to China 15 June 1948
- USS Implicit (AM-455), was a minesweeper launched 1 August 1953 and transferred to Taiwan 30 September 1994
