= USS Idealia =

Patrol vessel of the United States Navy

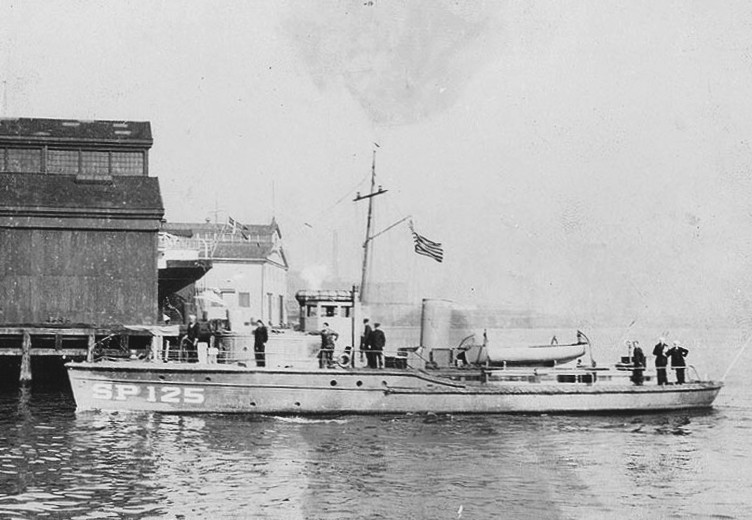
- USS Idealia (SP-125), c. 1918

History

United States
- Name: Idealia
- Namesake: name retained by the Navy
- Owner: Electric Launch Company (ELCO)
- Builder: Electric Launch Company (ELCO) of Bayonne, New Jersey
- Laid down: date unknown
- Launched: 1912
- Completed: 1912
- Acquired: by the Navy under lease on 25 May 1917
- Commissioned: May 1917 as USS Idealia (SP-125)
- Decommissioned: November 1918 (est.)

General characteristics
- Tonnage: 52 GRT
- Length: 84 ft (25.6 m) length overall; 76 ft 6 in (23.3 m) length at waterline
- Beam: 13 ft 10 in (4.2 m) registered; 13 ft 8 in (4.2 m) Navy data
- Draft: 4 ft (1.2 m) registered; 3 ft 10 in (1.2 m) mean, Navy
- Depth: 6 ft 4 in (1.9 m)
- Propulsion: 1 2 cy, 6 cyl diesel original; 1 4 cy, 6 cyl diesel
- Speed: 12 knots (14 mph; 22 km/h) cruising; 14 knots (16 mph; 26 km/h) maximum
- Range: 868 nautical miles (999 mi; 1,608 km)
- Crew: 4 (Yacht); 13 (Navy)
- Armament: One 1-pounder gun, 2 x machine guns

Idealia was America's first diesel powered yacht built and owned by the Electric Launch Company (ELCO). The yacht was built in 1911, launched in 1912 and demonstrated the potential for use of diesel engines in yachts for several years thereafter. She yacht performed a public trial on the Hudson River on 22 October 1913 under the supervision of ELCO's manager Henry R. Sutphen with a gathering of naval architects and engineers as observers. Idealia was sold to individual owners after its period of demonstrating the diesel engine's pleasure craft utility.

The yacht was acquired by the U.S. Navy during World War I to operate as USS Idealia (SP-125). She was used as an armed patrol craft and patrolled the Delaware River from Philadelphia, Pennsylvania, to Cape May, New Jersey, on the Delaware Bay. She was eventually reconfigured to her civilian condition by the Navy and returned to her owner.

== America's first diesel yacht ==
Idealia was designed and built in 1911 and launched in 1912 by the Electric Launch Company (ELCO), Bayonne, New Jersey to become the first American motor yacht to be equipped with diesel engines. (Note: Idealia is not found in the registers until several years after launch, possibly due to being an ELCO prototype rather than privately owned yacht. It is not listed in Annual List of Merchant Vessels of the United States for 1914 but first appears in Annual List of Merchant Vessels of the United States for 1915.) The yacht, with the engine costing the company more than $50,000 to develop, was an ELCO prototype demonstrating the engine's suitability for yachts. Only seven diesel yachts were in service as listed in 1913. Those were foreign, except for Idealia and included the Krupp built Meteor IV built for Kaiser Wilhelm, Russia's Intermezzo, Germany's Helgoland, and two Russian and one French unnamed yachts. At that time the second American diesel yacht, Rurthu, was being built by the Matthews Boat Company.

On 22 October 1913 under ELCO corporate manager Henry R. Sutphen Idealia performed a trial on the Hudson River witnessed by naval engineers and architects on a run of about sixty miles from the Columbia Yacht Club at 86th Street to Croton Point and back.

Notable in the trial was the operating economy of the diesel compared with the steam and particularly the gasoline engines in common use. In the five hour run, in which the ease of starting, reversing the engine and other operation was of fuel oil costing $1.14 with another forty cents of lubricating oil brought the total cost of the run to $1.54. The comparison with the estimated cost of a similar powered gasoline vessel was $13.90 with further benefit of a reduction in insurance cost for not having gasoline aboard also noted.

Idealia first appears in the Forty Seventh Annual List of Merchant Vessels of the United States, 1915, with official number 213497, signal letters LDNM, port of registry New York, and owned by ELCO.

=== General description ===
Idealia was a wooden hull, 52 GRT vessel of 84 ft (25.6 m) length overall, 76 ft 6 in (23.3 m) length at waterline, 13 ft 10 in (4.2 m) beam, 6 ft 4 in (1.9 m) depth and 4 ft (1.2 m) draft according to 1917 registration details. (Note: Most article references round the beam to 14 ft (4.3 m) and Navy has 13 ft 8 in (4.2 m) in its 1918 data.)

The yacht's forecastle was devoted to crew space for four men. Aft of it was the dining saloon, capable of seating eight to ten persons at a table with a view outside and storage lockers for dishes, utensils and table linens. Aft of the saloon was the galley that occupied the full width of the vessel below deck. One advantage noted in reviews was that the diesel engine was compact and occupied little space with that compartment behind the galley beyond a watertight bulkhead. Aft on the starboard side was the companionway that led below to a lobby with the owners quarters forward and a large stateroom aft and a bathroom. Storage and space for a large storage battery to supplement the electrical system was aft of the quarters. All owner and guest spaces were finished in mahogany.

The register of Merchant vessels of the United States for the year ending 30 June 1916 still shows ELCO as owner of the vessel. By 25 May 1917, when the vessel was delivered to the Navy, the Navy data shows Ira D. Bertolet Jr. as owner indicating a sale by ELCO.

==== Engines ====
The original engine was provided by the New London Ship and Engine Company (NELSECO) and described as American-Nuremberg heavy oil diesel engine. It was a reversible, air started, two cycle engine with six working cylinders and one two stage air compression cylinder that was rated at 150 horsepower at 550 revolutions per minute. To avoid possibility of not having compressed air to start the main engine a hand startable 10 horsepower auxiliary air compressor engine that also drove a 5kW generator was installed.

The original two stroke engine was replaced by a NELSECO 120 horsepower four cycle engine by February 1915.

== World War I service ==
Idealia was acquired under free least by the Navy on 25 May 1917 and commissioned the same day designated (SP-125). Navy data shows the vessel, with a thirteen-man crew, having a cruising speed of 12 knots (14 mph; 22 km/h), a maximum speed of 14 knots (16 mph; 26 km/h) with an endurance of 868 nautical miles (999 mi; 1,608 km). The vessel was armed with a single one pounder gun and two machine guns.

Idealia was assigned to the 4th Naval District, based at Cape May, New Jersey, and operated as a harbor entrance patrol craft on the Delaware River and at Philadelphia, Pennsylvania, and in Delaware Bay. She was returned to her owner, Ira D. Bertolet Jr., of Philadelphia, 22 November 1918.
