= USS Keywadin =

USS Keywadin may refer to:

- USS Keywadin (1869), was a monitor ironclad steamer originally named Kickapoo; then renamed Cyclops from 15 June to 10 August 1869, and then to Kewaydin
- USS Keywadin (ATA-213), was a tugboat, commissioned on 1 June 1945, served in World War II and sunk as a target in 2001
