= USS Julia =

USS Julia may refer to the following ships of the United States Navy:

- USS Julia (1812), was a schooner during the War of 1812
- USS Julia (1863), was an English sloop captured by the Union Navy 8 January 1863 and sold in 1865
