= USS Kenneth L. McNeal =

Minesweeper of the United States Navy

History

United States
- Name: USS Kenneth L. McNeal
- Namesake: Previous name retained
- Builder: M. M. Davis, Solomon's Island, Maryland
- Completed: 1913
- Acquired: Purchased 31 May 1917; Delivered 14 June 1917
- Commissioned: 10 August 1917
- Decommissioned: 8 September 1919
- Fate: Sold
- Notes: Operated as commercial fishing boat Kenneth L. McNeal 1913-1917; returned to commercial service 1919

General characteristics
- Type: Minesweeper
- Tonnage: 331 gross register tons
- Length: 160 ft (49 m)
- Beam: 24 ft (7.3 m)
- Draft: 12 ft (3.7 m)
- Speed: 11 knots
- Complement: 24
- Armament: 1 × 3-inch (76.2-mm) gun

USS Kenneth L. McNeal (SP-333) was a minesweeper that served in the United States Navy from 1917 to 1919.

Kenneth L. McNeal was built as a commercial fishing boat of the same name in 1913 by M. M. Davis at Solomon's Island, Maryland. On 31 May 1917, the U.S. Navy purchased her from her owners, the McNeal Dodson Company, Inc., of Reedville, Virginia, for naval use during World War I. She was delivered to the Navy on 14 June 1917 at Norfolk, Virginia, and was commissioned there as USS Kenneth L. McNeal (SP-333) on 10 August 1917.

After fitting out as a minesweeper, Kenneth L. McNeal departed Norfolk on 17 August 1917 bound for Boston, Massachusetts, then left Boston on 26 August 1917 bound for Brest, France. She arrived at Brest on 9 September 1917 and began minesweeping patrols and coastal escort duty along the Brittany coast from Vannes to Saint-Brieuc. She continued these operations for the rest of World War I and into early 1919.

Kenneth L. McNeal was damaged while operating out of Brest in February 1919. The U.S. Navy offered her for sale on 11 May 1919 and decommissioned her at Brest on 8 September 1919. She was sold to Union d'Entreprisen Marocaine of Casablanca, French Morocco.
