= USS Jerry Briggs =

United States Navy patrol vessel used in World War One

History

United States
- Name: USS Jerry Briggs
- Namesake: Previous name retained
- Acquired: 1918
- Commissioned: 17 August 1918
- Decommissioned: 3 April 1919
- Fate: Returned to owner 3 April 1919
- Notes: Operated as civilian motorboat Rosalinda and Jerry Briggs until 1918 and Jerry Briggs from 1919

General characteristics
- Type: Patrol vessel
- Tonnage: 2 Gross register tons
- Length: 25 ft (7.6 m)
- Beam: 7 ft (2.1 m)
- Complement: 2

USS Jerry Briggs was a United States Navy patrol vessel in commission from 1918 to 1919.

Jerry Briggs was built as the private motorboat Rosalinda. She was renamed Jerry Briggs while in civilian use. In 1918, the U.S. Navy acquired Jerry Briggs under a free lease from her owner, Mrs. Myra Briggs, for use as a section patrol boat during World War I. She never received a section patrol (SP) number, but she was commissioned as USS Jerry Briggs on 17 August 1918.

Jerry Briggs operated out of Saint Helena oil station in the South Atlantic Ocean for the rest of World War I and into 1919. She was decommissioned on 3 April 1919 returned to Briggs the same day.
