= USS Justin =

USS Justin may refer to the following ships of the United States Navy:

- USS Justin (1891), was a steamship purchased by the US Navy 27 April 1898 and decommissioned 20 December 1915
- USS Justin (IX-228), was a cargo ship acquired by the US Navy 2 September 1945 and sold 25 May 1954
