= USS Kasota =

Tugboat of the United States Navy

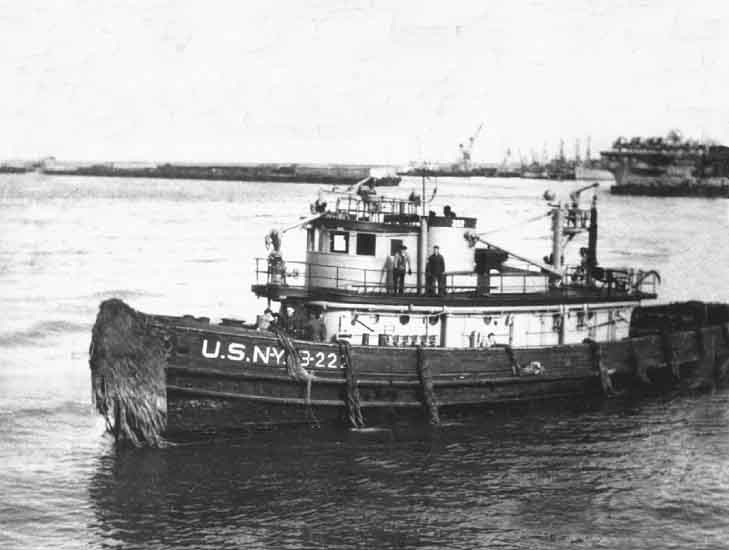
- USS Kasota (YTB-222) coming along an unidentified ship at Norfolk, VA.

History

United States
- Name: USS Kasota (YTB-222)
- Builder: Elizabeth City Shipyard, Elizabeth City, NC
- Launched: 20 January 1944
- Sponsored by: Miss Norma Crawley
- In service: 4 September 1944
- Reclassified: Large District Harbor Tug YTB-227, 15 May 1944
- Stricken: 1 May 1961
- Fate: unknown

General characteristics
- Class & type: Cahto-class district harbor tug
- Displacement: 410 long tons (417 t)
- Length: 110 ft 0 in (33.53 m)
- Beam: 27 ft 0 in (8.23 m)
- Draft: 11 ft 4 in (3.45 m)
- Speed: 12 knots (22 km/h; 14 mph)
- Complement: 12
- Armament: 2 × .50-caliber machine guns

Kasota was laid down as YT-222; launched 20 January 1944 by the Elizabeth City Shipyard, Elizabeth City, N.C.; sponsored by Miss Norma Crawley; and reclassified YTB-222 15 May 1944 prior to being placed in service 4 September for duty in the 5th Naval District. Kasota operated out of Norfolk as a district and service craft until 1 May 1961 when she was struck from the Navy List.
