= USS John Paul Jr. =

Gunboat of the United States Navy

History

United States
- Launched: 1862–1863
- In service: March 1863
- Out of service: June 1864
- Fate: Sold, 17 August 1865

General characteristics
- Propulsion: steam engine
- Armament: one small howitzer

USS John Paul Jr. was a steamer acquired by the Union Navy during the beginning of the American Civil War.

She served the Union Navy’s struggle against the Confederate States of America as a ship’s tender, an observation platform, and as a gunboat despite the fact she was only lightly armed.

== Service history ==
Paul Jones Jr. was built in 1862–1863 and was assigned as tender to U.S. gunboat USS Seneca of the South Atlantic Blockading Squadron during the Civil War. A shallow draft vessel, she was used effectively as an observation boat to gather intelligence in the outlets and estuaries of St. Simon’s and Doboy Sounds, Altamaha (Buttermilk Channel), Georgia. Never mounting more than one small howitzer, she also assisted Seneca in guarding the sounds to prevent Confederate river steamers, which were generally unarmed, from using the waterways. Paul Jones Jr. served in this capacity from March 1863 through June 1864. She was sold 17 August 1865.
