= USS Kodiak =

USS Kodiak may refer to the following ships of the United States Navy:

- USS Kodiak (LSM-161) was launched 27 June 1944 and decommissioned 19 April 1965
- USS Kodiak (YF-866) was launched 26 October 1945 and sunk as a target in 1988
