= USS Jonquil =

Gunboat of the United States Navy

History

United States
- Acquired: 21 October 1863
- Commissioned: 28 October 1863
- Decommissioned: 2 August 1865
- Fate: Sold, 21 October 1865

General characteristics
- Displacement: 90 tons
- Length: 69 ft 4 in (21.13 m)
- Beam: 17 ft 6 in (5.33 m)
- Draft: 6 ft 7 in (2.01 m)
- Propulsion: marine steam engine; screw propelled
- Speed: 8 knots (15 km/h; 9.2 mph)
- Complement: 15
- Armament: two 12-pounder guns (rifled)

USS Jonquil was a warship commissioned by the U.S. Navy in 1863. She served the Union Navy during the American Civil War.

== Service history ==
Jonquil was purchased at Philadelphia, Pennsylvania, from S. F. Baker under the name J. K. Kirkman 21 October 1863; and commissioned at Philadelphia Navy Yard 28 October, Acting Ensign I. T. Halstead in command. A week later Jonquil joined the South Atlantic Blockading Squadron and took station off Charleston, South Carolina. Except for brief periods of repair and three months in the sounds of Georgia during the fall of 1864, she served for the remainder of the war in Charleston waters. She took her first prize 25 February 1865 when she captured an unidentified sloop in Deer Creek about 18 miles upstream from Charleston. She repeated the feat only two days later with a second sloop in Silver Creek.

Perhaps Jonquil's most valuable service was early in March when she labored to sweep Charleston waters of stationary naval mines (then called "torpedoes", a term later reserved for mobile aquatic explosives) after the city had surrendered. While she was so engaged, a mine exploded aboard her, knocking nine men overboard and wounding three others. Prompt and effective repairs enabled the ship to be back at her task of sweeping the harbor the next day. Jonquil returned north at the end of July and was decommissioned 2 August 1865. She was sold at public auction 21 October 1865.
