= USS Kennebec =

USS Kennebec may refer to the following ships of the United States Navy:

- USS Kennebec (1861), a gunboat, launched in 1861, commissioned in 1862 and sold in 1865.
- USS Kennebec (AO-36), an oiler, commissioned in 1942 and struck in 1976.

== See also ==
- List of current ships of the United States Navy
