= USS Kilauea =

USS Kilauea may refer to the following ships of the United States Navy:

- USS Kilauea (AE-4), was acquired by the US Navy 14 November 1940 and renamed Mount Baker on 17 March 1943
- USS Kilauea (T-AE-26), was launched in 1967 and removed from service in 2008
