= USS Idylease =

Patrol vessel of the United States Navy

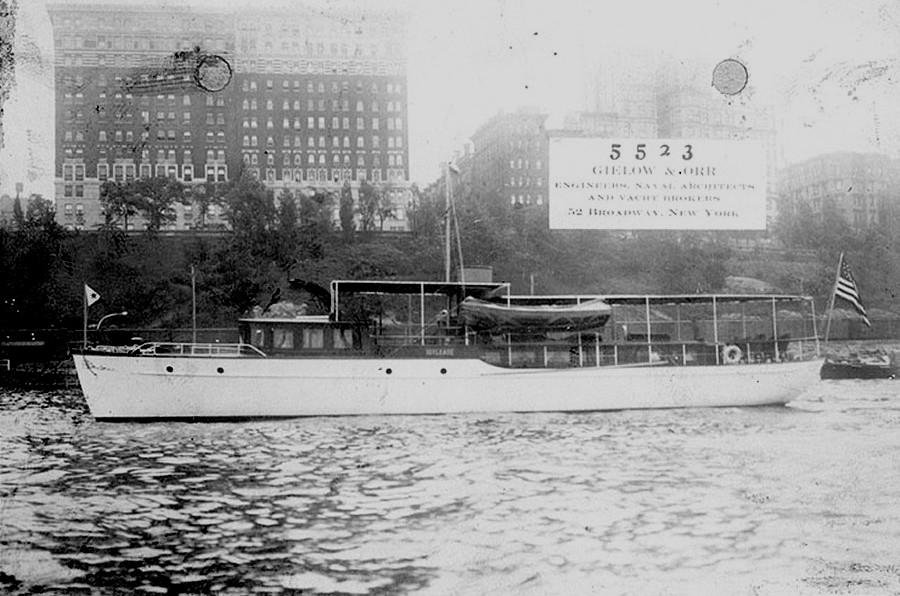
- Idylease (American Motor Boat, 1916) probably in New York Harbor, c. 1916-1917.

History

United States
- Name: USS Idylease
- Namesake: Previous name retained
- Owner: Richard Goldsmith of New York City
- Builder: Kyle and Purdy, City Island, New York
- Christened: as the pleasure motor boat Idylease
- Completed: 1916
- Acquired: leased by the Navy, June 1917
- Commissioned: 9 July 1917
- Decommissioned: c. April 1919
- Stricken: c. April 1919
- Home port: Hampton Roads, Virginia; Norfolk, Virginia
- Fate: Returned to her owner at Norfolk 30 April 1919

General characteristics
- Type: Yacht
- Tonnage: 29 tons
- Length: 65 ft (20 m)
- Beam: 13 ft 6 in (4.11 m)
- Draft: 2 ft 6 in (0.76 m)
- Propulsion: motor
- Speed: 10 knots
- Complement: not known
- Armament: One 1-pounder gun

USS Idylease (SP-119) was a motor yacht leased by the U.S. Navy during World War I. She was outfitted as a patrol craft and was assigned to the Hampton Roads and Norfolk, Virginia, waterways. Post-war, she was restored to her civilian configuration and returned to her owner.

== Constructed in New York ==
Idylease (SP-119), a 65-foot motor yacht, was built in 1916 by Kyle and Purdy, City Island, New York as the civilian pleasure motor boat of the same name; acquired by the Navy from Richard Goldsmith of New York City in June 1917, and commissioned 9 July 1917.

== World War I service ==
Assigned to the 5th Naval District for the rest of World War I and during the initial post-war months, Idylease performed patrol and radio inspection duties in Hampton Roads, Norfolk, Virginia, and on the Elizabeth River during the war.

== Post-war disposition ==
She was returned to her owner at Norfolk 30 April 1919.
