= USS Kensington =

USS Kensington may refer to:

- USS Kensington (1861), was a wooden, sail-rigged vessel purchased by the US Navy for the Stone Fleet
- USS Kensington (1862), was a steamer purchased by the US Navy 27 January 1862 and sold 12 July 1865
