= USS Willard Keith =

USS Willard Keith has been the name of more than one United States Navy ship, and may refer to:

- USS Willard Keith (DE-754), a destroyer escort cancelled in 1943 prior to completion
- USS Willard Keith (DE-314), a destroyer escort cancelled in 1944 prior to completion
- USS Willard Keith (DD-775), a destroyer in commission from 1944 to 1972
