= USS John Sealy =

Minesweeper of the United States Navy

History

United States
- Name: USS John Sealy or John Sealey
- Namesake: Previous name retained
- Completed: 1910
- Acquired: 25 April 1917
- Fate: Returned to owner 10 August 1917
- Notes: Operated as commercial tug John Sealy or John Sealey from 1910 until April 1917 and from August 1917

General characteristics
- Type: Minesweeper
- Tonnage: 113 gross register tons
- Length: 88 ft 10 in (27.08 m)
- Beam: 20 ft 6 in (6.25 m)
- Draft: 9 ft 9 in (2.97 m)
- Propulsion: One 350 indicated horsepower (261-kilowatt) steam engine, one shaft
- Speed: 10 knots
- Complement: 12
- Armament: 2 × 1-pounder guns

USS John Sealy (SP-568), also spelled John Sealey, was a United States Navy minesweeper in commission during 1917.

John Sealy was built as a commercial steam tug of the same name in 1910 at West Lake, Louisiana. On 25 April 1917, the U.S. Navy acquired her from her owner, D. M. Picton, for use as a minesweeper on the section patrol during World War I. She was commissioned as USS John Sealy (SP-568).

After brief service as a minesweeper, John Sealy was returned to her owner on 10 August 1917.
