= USS Katydid =

Patrol vessel of the United States Navy

History

United States
- Name: USS Katydid
- Namesake: Previous name retained
- Builder: William Hoff, New Rochelle, New York
- Completed: 1912
- Acquired: 27 March 1917
- Commissioned: 10 May 1917
- Fate: Laid up 9 December 1919; Transferred to United States Department of War 18 February 1920
- Notes: Operated as private motorboat Katydid 1912-1917

General characteristics
- Type: Patrol vessel
- Tonnage: 10 tons
- Length: 40 ft (12 m)
- Beam: 9 ft 2 in (2.79 m)
- Draft: 3 ft 4 in (1.02 m)
- Speed: 10 knots
- Complement: 7
- Armament: 1 × 1-pounder gun

USS Katydid (SP-95) was an armed motorboat that served in the United States Navy as a patrol vessel from 1917 to 1919.

Katydid was built as a civilian motorboat in 1912 by William Hoff at New Rochelle, New York. Anticipating the entry of the United States into World War I the following month, the U.S. Navy purchased her on 27 March 1917 from her owner, Arnold G. Dana, for use as a patrol boat. Assigned to the 3rd Naval District on 4 April 1917, she was commissioned on 10 May 1917 as USS Katydid (SP-95).

In 1917, Katydid operated in New York Harbor and nearby waters serving as launch to the training ship USS Wasp and troop transport USS President Grant (ID-3014). Subsequently, she deployed to France.

Katydid was laid up on 9 December 1919. She was transferred to the United States Department of War on 18 February 1920 for service with the United States Army Ordnance Department at Neville Island, Pennsylvania.
