= USS Idaho (SP-545) =

Patrol vessel of the United States Navy

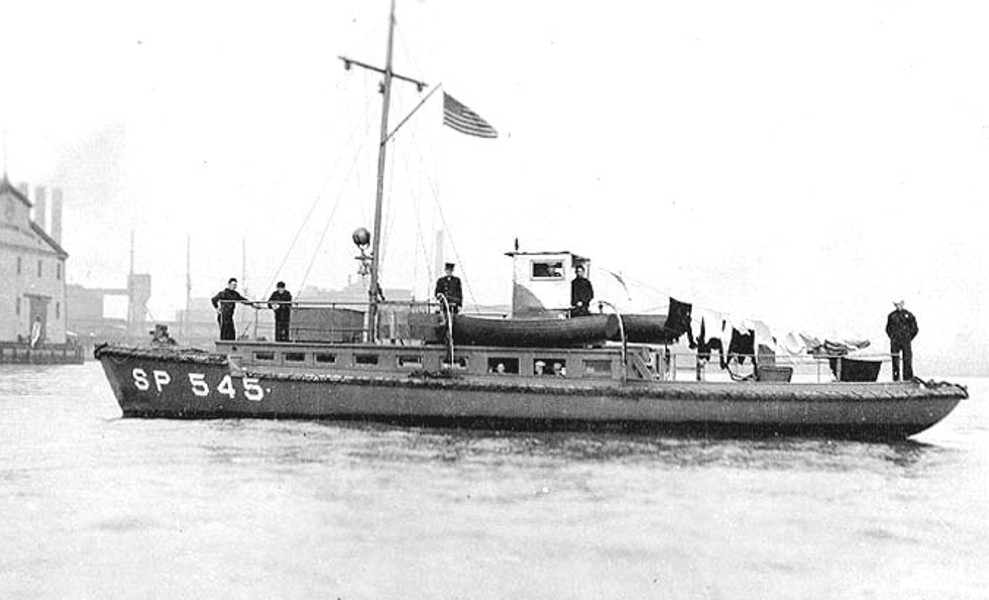
- USS Idaho (SP-545) photographed in the Delaware River area, circa 1917-18.

History

United States
- Name: USS Idaho
- Namesake: Idaho, the 43d State of the Union, admitted in 1890
- Owner: W. W. Vensel of Pittsburgh, Pennsylvania
- Builder: Stearns & McKay, Marblehead, Massachusetts
- Laid down: date unknown
- Launched: date unknown
- Completed: 1907
- Acquired: June 1917
- Commissioned: 12 July 1917 at Cape May, New Jersey
- Decommissioned: circa 1919
- Home port: Cape May, New Jersey; Philadelphia, Pennsylvania
- Fate: Returned to her owner 30 November 1918

General characteristics
- Type: Motorboat
- Tonnage: 23 tons
- Length: 60 ft (18 m)
- Beam: 12 ft 6 in (3.81 m)
- Draft: 4 ft (1.2 m)
- Propulsion: internal combustion engine
- Speed: 11 knots
- Complement: not known
- Armament: one AA machine gun

USS Idaho (SP-545) was an existing 60-foot-long motorboat purchased by the U.S. Navy during World War I. She was outfitted as an armed patrol craft and assigned to the Fourth Naval District based at League Island Navy Yard, near Philadelphia, Pennsylvania. Her patrol duties stretched from Philadelphia on the Delaware River to Cape May, New Jersey, on the Delaware Bay. Post-war she was returned to her owner.

== Commissioned at Cape May, N.J. ==
The third ship to be so named by the U.S. Navy, Idaho (SP-545), a motor boat, was built in 1907 by Stearns & McKay, Marblehead, Massachusetts; acquired from her owner, W. W. Vensel of Pittsburgh, Pennsylvania, in June 1917; and commissioned at Cape May, New Jersey, 12 July 1917.

== World War I service ==
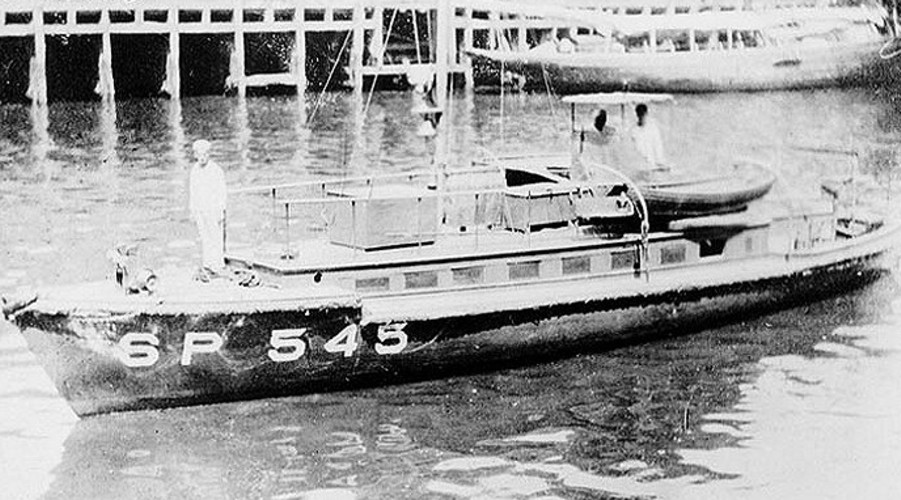
USS Idaho in the Delaware River.

Idaho was attached to the 4th Naval District which was headquartered at League Island Navy Yard on the Delaware River near Philadelphia, Pennsylvania.

She was assigned to patrol and general duties, serving on harbor entrance patrol, and submarine net patrol in the Cape May and Philadelphia areas.

== Post-war disposition ==
She was out of commission during the winter of 1917–18, and finally returned to her owner 30 November 1918.
