= USS Kemah =

Patrol vessel of the United States Navy

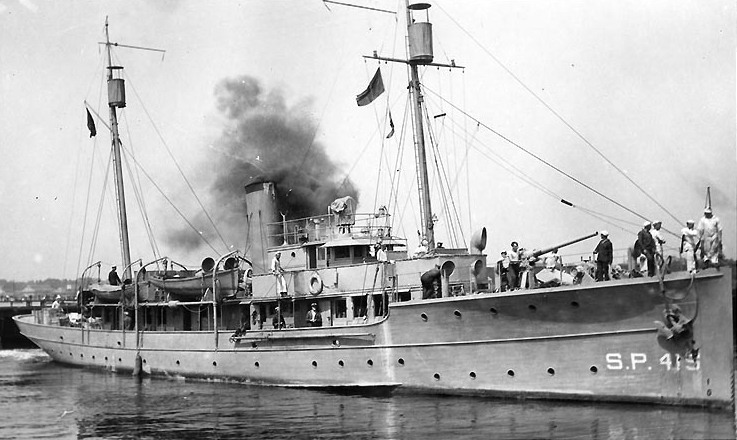
- USS Kemah (SP-415) in 1918 or 1919

History

United States
- Name: USS Kemah
- Namesake: Previous name retained
- Builder: Luders Marine Construction Company, Stamford, Connecticut
- Laid down: 1917
- Acquired: 7 October 1917
- Completed: 1918
- Commissioned: 16 July 1918
- Decommissioned: 18 September 1919
- Fate: Sold 22 September 1919

General characteristics
- Type: Patrol vessel
- Tonnage: 300 gross register tons
- Length: 146 ft (45 m)
- Beam: 21 ft (6.4 m)
- Draft: 9 ft (2.7 m) aft
- Propulsion: Diesel engine, two shafts
- Speed: 13 knots
- Complement: 51
- Armament: 2 × 3-inch (76.2 mm) guns

USS Kemah (SP-415) was a United States Navy patrol vessel in commission from 1918 to 1919.

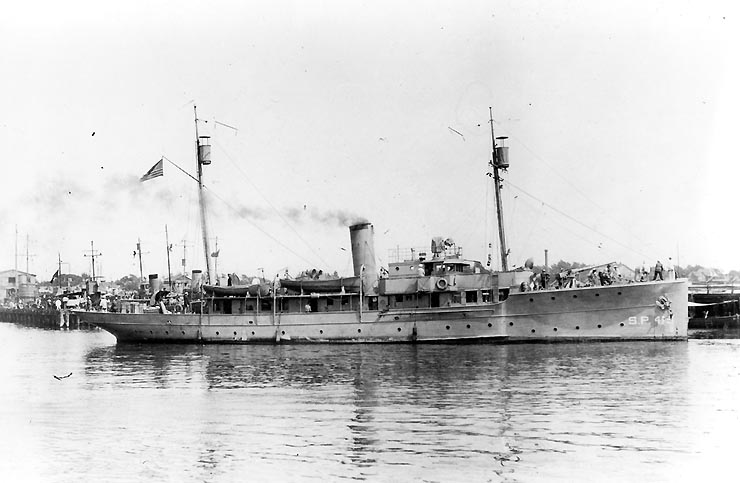
USS Kemah in 1918 or 1919.

Kemah was laid down as a private motor yacht of the same name in 1917 by the Luders Marine Construction Company at Stamford, Connecticut. While she was still under construction, the U.S. Navy acquired her from her owner, F. E. Lewis II of New York City, on 7 October 1917 for use as a section patrol vessel during World War I. She was completed in 1918, brought to the New York Navy Yard in April 1918, and commissioned there as USS Kemah (SP-415) on 16 July 1918.

Initially assigned to the 6th Naval District, Kemah was reassigned to the 3rd Naval District at New York City upon commissioning. Restricted to protected waters, Kemah served as a guard ship in New York Harbor's coastal waters until she was removed from active service on 3 September 1919.

Kemah was decommissioned on 18 September 1919. She was sold to R. T. Robinson of San Diego, California, on 22 September 1919.
