= USS K-3 =

The name USS K-3 may refer to the following ships of the United States Navy:

- USS K-3 (SS-34), a K-class submarine, originally named Orca
- USS K-3 (SSK-3), a Barracuda-class submarine, later renamed Bonita
