= USS Kingbird (AMc-56) =

Minesweeper of the United States Navy

History

United States
- Ordered: as Governor Saltonstall
- Launched: 1939
- Acquired: 26 December 1940
- Commissioned: 24 July 1941
- Decommissioned: 28 July 1944
- Stricken: date unknown
- Fate: Transferred to the WSA for disposal, 7 June 1946

General characteristics
- Displacement: 206 tons
- Length: 96 ft (29 m)
- Beam: 21 ft 6 in (6.55 m)
- Draft: 7 ft (2.1 m)
- Speed: 9 kts
- Armament: two .30 caliber machine guns

USS Kingbird (AMc-56) was a wooden dragger acquired by the U.S. Navy, just prior to World War II, for clearing coastal minefields.

The first Kingbird (AMC-56), ex-Governor Saltonstall, was built in 1939 by the Quincy Drydock & Yacht Co., Quincy, Massachusetts, acquired by the Navy 26 December 1940, and placed in service as a coastal minesweeper in the 1st Naval District 24 July 1941.

Following assignment to Portsmouth, New Hampshire, in January 1942, Kingbird operated in the 1st Naval District as a coastal minesweeper for over 2 years. She was reclassified IX-176 10 July 1944 and placed out of service 28 July 1944 for use in training sound operators for new submarines.

Kingbird was transferred to the War Shipping Administration 7 June 1946 for disposal. Her fate is unknown.
