= USRC Jefferson (1802) =

Schooner

History

United States
- Operator: Revenue Marine
- Commissioned: 1802
- Decommissioned: 1817
- Fate: Sold

General characteristics
- Type: Schooner
- Complement: unknown
- Armament: unknown

USRC Jefferson was a schooner purchased in 1802 by the United States Revenue Marine and stationed at Norfolk, Virginia where she enforced customs laws. She was named in honor of Founding Father Thomas Jefferson, the principal author of the Declaration of Independence and third President of the United States.

At the beginning of the War of 1812, Jefferson was placed under U.S. Navy orders and in June, 1812 captured a British brig bound for Halifax, Nova Scotia from the West Indies. Later the same year, she captured the schooner Patriot. In 1813, on the James River, she freed the crew of the American schooner Flight, who had been seized by three British barges. In 1817, Jefferson captured the Spanish brig Providentia, the unlawful prize of the privateer Mangero, loyal to the United Provinces of the Río de la Plata. There is inconclusive evidence that a second Spanish ship may have also been taken. Later the same year the Jefferson was sold.
