= USS Jaydee III =

Patrol vessel of the United States Navy

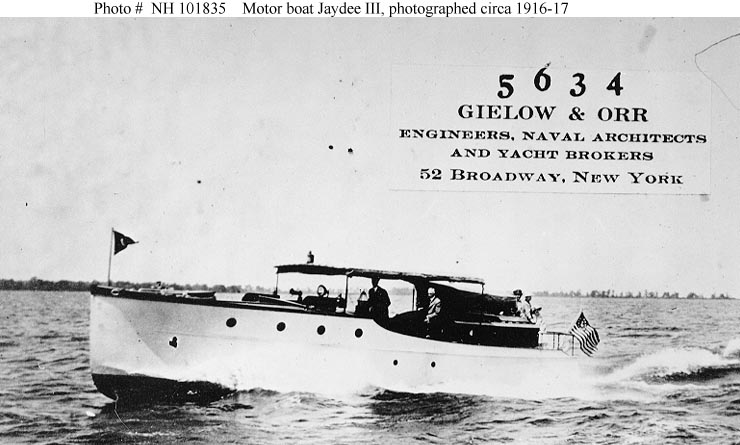
- Jaydee III as a civilian motorboat sometime in 1916 or 1917.

History

United States
- Name: USS Jaydee III
- Namesake: Previous name retained
- Builder: Matthews Boat Company, Port Clinton, Ohio
- Completed: 1916
- Acquired: 19 May 1917 or June 1917
- Commissioned: 12 June 1917
- Fate: Returned to owner 7 March 1919
- Notes: Operated as private motorboat Jaydee III 1916-1917 and from 1919

General characteristics
- Type: Patrol vessel
- Tonnage: 23 gross register tons
- Length: 45 ft (14 m)
- Beam: 10 ft (3.0 m)
- Draft: 3 ft (0.91 m)
- Speed: 20 knots
- Complement: 5
- Armament: 1 × 1-pounder gun; 1 × machine gun

USS Jaydee III (SP-692) was a United States Navy patrol vessel in commission from 1917 to 1919.

Jaydee III was built in 1916 as a private motorboat of the same name by the Matthews Boat Company at Port Clinton, Ohio. On 19 May 1917 or in June 1917, the U.S. Navy acquired her from her owners - R. Talbot, J. C. Wright, Howard Wilson, and Irving Chapin, of Lincoln, Nebraska - for use as a section patrol vessel during World War I. She was commissioned as USS Jaydee III (SP-692) at Detroit, Michigan, on 12 June 1917.

Assigned to the 9th, 10th, and 11th Naval Districts - at the time a single administration entity created by the amalgamation of the 9th Naval District, 10th Naval District, and 11th Naval District - and based at Detroit, Jaydee III served as a patrol craft and shipping traffic regulator on the Detroit River for the rest of World War I.

Jaydee III was returned to her owners on 7 March 1919.
