= USS James M. Gilliss =

USS James M. Gilliss may refer to one of the following United States Navy ships:

- USS James M. Gilliss (AMCU-13) (also AGS-13, AGSC-13, MHC-13), laid down as YMS-262; renamed 23 March 1945; struck and sold, 1960
- USNS James M. Gilliss (T-AGOR-4), an oceanographic research ship launched 1962; sold to Mexico as Altair (H-05) in 1996
