= USS Kumigan =

Patrol vessel of the United States Navy

History

United States
- Name: USS Kumigan (proposed)
- Namesake: Previous name retained
- Builder: Great Lakes Boat Building Corporation
- Completed: 1917
- Acquired: 8 May 1917
- Commissioned: Never
- Fate: Returned to owner early summer 1917
- Notes: Saw no active U.S. Navy service

General characteristics
- Type: Patrol vessel (proposed)
- Tonnage: 34 tons
- Length: 76 ft (23 m)
- Beam: 13 ft (4.0 m)
- Draft: 2 ft 9 in (0.84 m)
- Armament: 1 × 1-pounder gun

USS Kumigan (SP-97) was the proposed name and designation for an armed yacht acquired in 1917 that never saw active service in the United States Navy.

Kumigan was built as a civilian motor yacht in 1917 by the Great Lakes Boat Building Corporation. The U.S. Navy acquired her on 8 May 1917 from her owner, Albert Pack of East Chicago, Illinois, for use as a patrol vessel during World War I.

Kumigan was assigned the section patrol designation SP-97 and was enrolled in the Naval Coastal Defense Reserve on 10 May 1917. However, she was never commissioned, saw no active U.S. Navy service, and was returned to her owner early in the summer of 1917.
