= USS Kanawha (SP-169) =

Patrol vessel of the United States Navy

History

United States
- Name: USS Kanawha
- Namesake: The Kanawha River in West Virginia
- Acquired: 27 April 1917
- Commissioned: Never
- Fate: Returned to owner 1917

General characteristics
- Type: Patrol vessel

USS Kanawha (SP-169) was a patrol vessel which never saw active service that was purchased by the United States Navy in 1917.

The U.S. Navy purchased USS Kanawha from H. C. Baxter of Brunswick, Maine, on 27 April 1917 for use as a patrol vessel during World War I. She was designated SP-169, but was found defective during fitting out and was returned to her owner.

She should not be confused with the replenishment oiler USS Kanawha (AO-1) or the armed yacht USS Kanawha II (SP-130), both of which were in U.S. Navy service at or around the same time.
