= USS Juniata (SP-602) =

Patrol vessel of the United States Navy

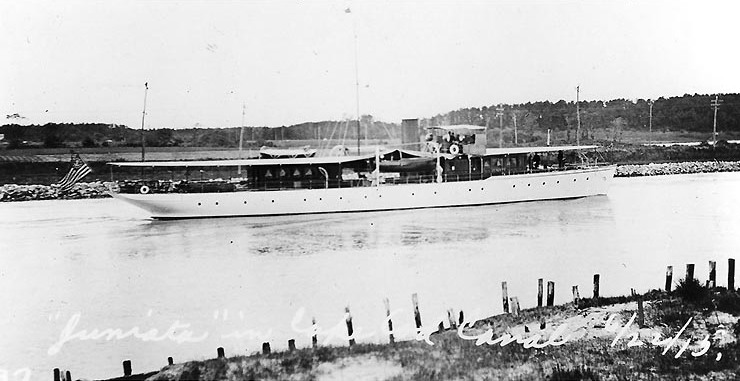
- Juniata as a private yacht in the Cape Cod Canal in Massachusetts on 22 June 1915.

History

United States
- Name: Josephine (1911–1914); Juniata (1914—)
- Namesake: Previous name retained
- Owner: Edward Shearson (1911–1914); George W. Elkins (1914—)
- Builder: Robert Jacobs, City Island, the Bronx, New York
- Completed: 1911
- Acquired: 1 June 1917
- Commissioned: 1 June 1917
- Decommissioned: 13 July 1918
- Identification: U.S. O/N: 208306
- Fate: Returned to owner 25 July 1918

General characteristics
- Type: Yacht; Patrol vessel
- Tonnage: 96 GRT
- Displacement: 142
- Length: 138 feet 4 inches (42.2 m) LOA 126 feet (38.4 m) WL; 139 ft 6 in (42.52 m)
- Beam: 17 feet 2 inches (5.2 m); 17 ft (5.2 m)
- Draft: 4 feet 6 inches (1.4 m); 6 ft (1.8 m)
- Depth: 8 feet 5 inches (2.6 m)
- Propulsion: two 6 cyl, gasoline engines
- Speed: 17 knots
- Armament: 1 × 3-pounder gun; 1 × 1-pounder gun; 2 × machine guns

The second USS Juniata (SP-602) was a United States Navy patrol vessel in commission from 1 June 1917 to 13 July 1918. Juniata was built as the private gasoline-powered motor yacht Josephine for Edward Shearson of New York by Robert Jacobs at City Island in the Bronx, New York, in 1911. She was sold in 1914 to George W. Elkins of Philadelphia and renamed Juniata.

== Construction ==
The power yacht Josephine was designed for Edward Shearson, a New York Yacht Club member, by William Gardner and built by Robert Jacobs at City Island, Bronx, New York. The yacht was twin screw, flush deck with two deck houses and at the time one of the larger power yachts built.

The steel hull, decked in white pine and teak, had five watertight bulkheads for four watertight compartments with living quarters below deck and dining and lounge saloons in above deck. The forward watertight compartment, subdivided into two compartments, with three officer staterooms and a dining area with the crew housed in the forecastle. The galley was directly forward of the machinery space with storage and a two-ton ice capacity ice box as well as a coal fired hot water boiler for ship's hot water use.

The two midships watertight compartments housed machinery and gasoline tanks with the machinery space the forward of the two housing two six-cylinder gasoline engines with 600 total horsepower to give a speed of "about 20 miles per hour (17 kn; 32 km/h)" and a single General Electric 5-kilowatt gasoline generator. The vessel was equipped with electric windlass, pumps for bilge and sanitary service, lighting, heating and cooking. The aft of the two midships watertight compartments contained three seamless, welded stainless steel tanks for 3,000 US gallons (11,000 L) of gasoline.

The aft compartment contained owner's and guests accommodations with three double and one single stateroom. The forward portion contained the owner's stateroom extending the full width of the vessel and containing two beds, wardrobes and bureaus, a dressing table and sofa with a fully equipped bathroom on the starboard side. A lobby and stairs to the upperdeck separated the owner's cabin from two double and one single guest staterooms, trunk room and bathroom. The deckhouse above was fitted in solid African mahogany and furnished in the Empire style and the forward deckhouse contained fourteen seat the Elizabethan style dining saloon with Tiger wood (specific variety unspecified) finishing and furniture. The vessel's bridge was atop the forward deckhouse, and three mahogany boats specially designed by William Gardner were a 24 feet (7.3 m) owner's launch, 18 feet (5.5 m) market launch and 14 feet (4.3 m) dinghy.

Ship's specifications were 138 feet (42.1 m) length overall, 17 feet (5.2 m) beam and 4 feet 6 inches (1.4 m) draft. Lloyd's Register of American Yachts for 1917 shows Juniata, formerly Josephine, with United States Official Number 208306, call sign LBST and gives the registered specifications of 96 GRT, 142 net tons, 138 feet 4 inches (42.2 m) length overall, 126 feet (38.4 m) waterline length, 17 feet 2 inches (5.2 m) beam, 4 feet 6 inches (1.4 m) draft and 8 feet 5 inches (2.6 m) depth.

== Yacht Josephine ==
Josephine cruised from Bar Harbor, Maine to Key West in winter and was commonly in Long Island Sound during summer operating between Shearson' home at Greenwich, Connecticut and New York City.

In 1914 Josephine was sold to George W. Elkins of Philadelphia and renamed Juniata.

== Navy service ==
On 1 June 1917, the U.S. Navy acquired Juniata from her owner, G. W. Elkins of Philadelphia, Pennsylvania, for use as a section patrol boat during World War I. She was commissioned at the Philadelphia Navy Yard the same day as USS Juniata (SP-602).

Assigned to the 4th Naval District and based at Lewes, Delaware, Juniata conducted patrols in the Delaware Bay for about the next 13 months.

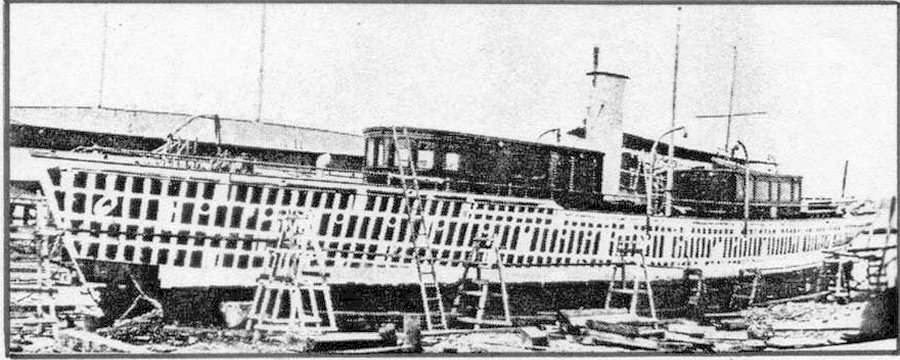
Juniata after Navy service at the Robert Jacobs shipyard at City Island. "The war paint had been scraped off and the frames had been cemented preparatory to repainting, and it looks as if the yacht was in frame about to be plated."

Juniata was decommissioned on 13 July 1918 and returned to Elkins on 25 July 1918.

== Bibliography ==
- Day, Thomas Fleming, ed. (1912). "Josephine". The Rudder. 27 (May 1912). Fawcett Publications: 316, 319.
- Lloyd's Register of Shipping (1917). Lloyd's Register of American Yachts. New York: Lloyd's Register of Shipping. p. 136.
- Naval History And Heritage Command. "Juniata (SP-602) ii". Dictionary of American Naval Fighting Ships. Naval History And Heritage Command.
- NavSource. "Juniata (SP 602)". NavSource.
