= USS Itasca II =

Patrol vessel of the United States Navy

History

United States
- Name: USS Itasca II
- Namesake: Previous name retained
- Builder: Hudson Yacht & Boat Building Company, Nyack, New York
- Completed: 1911
- Acquired: 29 May 1918
- Commissioned: 13 July 1918
- Decommissioned: 6 February 1919
- Fate: Returned to owner 1919
- Notes: Operated as private motorboat Itasca II 1911-1917 and from 1919

General characteristics
- Type: Patrol vessel
- Tonnage: 58 or 85 Gross register tons
- Length: 99 ft 9 in (30.40 m)
- Beam: 16 ft 7 in (5.05 m)
- Draft: 4 ft 9 in (1.45 m)
- Speed: 10 knots
- Complement: 10
- Armament: 1 × 6-pounder gun; 1 × 1-pounder gun; 2 × machine guns

USS Itasca II (SP-803) was a United States Navy patrol vessel in commission from 1917 to 1918.

Itasca II was built as a private motorboat of the same name in 1911 by the Hudson Yacht & Boat Building Company at Nyack, New York. On 29 May 1918, the U.S. Navy acquired her under a free lease from her owner, E. B. Hawkins of Duluth, Minnesota, for use as a section patrol boat during World War I. She was commissioned as USS Itasca II (SP-803) on 13 July 1918.

Assigned to the 3rd Naval District and based at New York City, Itasca II served on harbor and section patrol duties for the rest of World War I and into 1919.

Itasca II was decommissioned on 6 February 1919 and returned to Hawkins
