= USS Kalmia (1863) =

Tugboat of the United States Navy

History

United States
- Ordered: as Innes
- Laid down: date unknown
- Launched: 1863
- Acquired: 5 October 1863
- In service: circa October 1863
- Out of service: 1865 (est.)
- Stricken: 1865 (est.)
- Fate: Sold, 25 October 1865

General characteristics
- Displacement: 112 tons
- Length: 85 ft (26 m)
- Beam: 19 ft 6 in (5.94 m)
- Draught: 8 ft (2.4 m)
- Propulsion: steam engine; screw-propelled
- Speed: 12 knots
- Complement: not known
- Armament: two guns

USS Kalmia was a steamer acquired by the Union Navy during the American Civil War. She was used by the Union Navy as a tugboat in support of the Union Navy blockade of Confederate waterways.

Kalmia, a screw steamer, was built as Innes at Philadelphia in 1863 and purchased for the Navy by Rear Admiral Hiram Paulding 5 October from her owner, Arron Innes, Poughkeepsie, New York.

Renamed Kalmia 24 April 1864, the Naval Register of 1865 lists her as assigned to the North Atlantic Blockade Squadron as a fourth-rate tug. No further record of her other naval service has been found.

Kalmia was sold at public auction in New York City, New York, 25 October 1865. She was redocumented as F. B. Thurber 12 December; renamed James Hughes 8 November 1898; and destroyed by fire 15 June 1905 at Bartlett's Point, New York.
