= USS Jeannette Skinner =

Cargo ship of the United States Navy

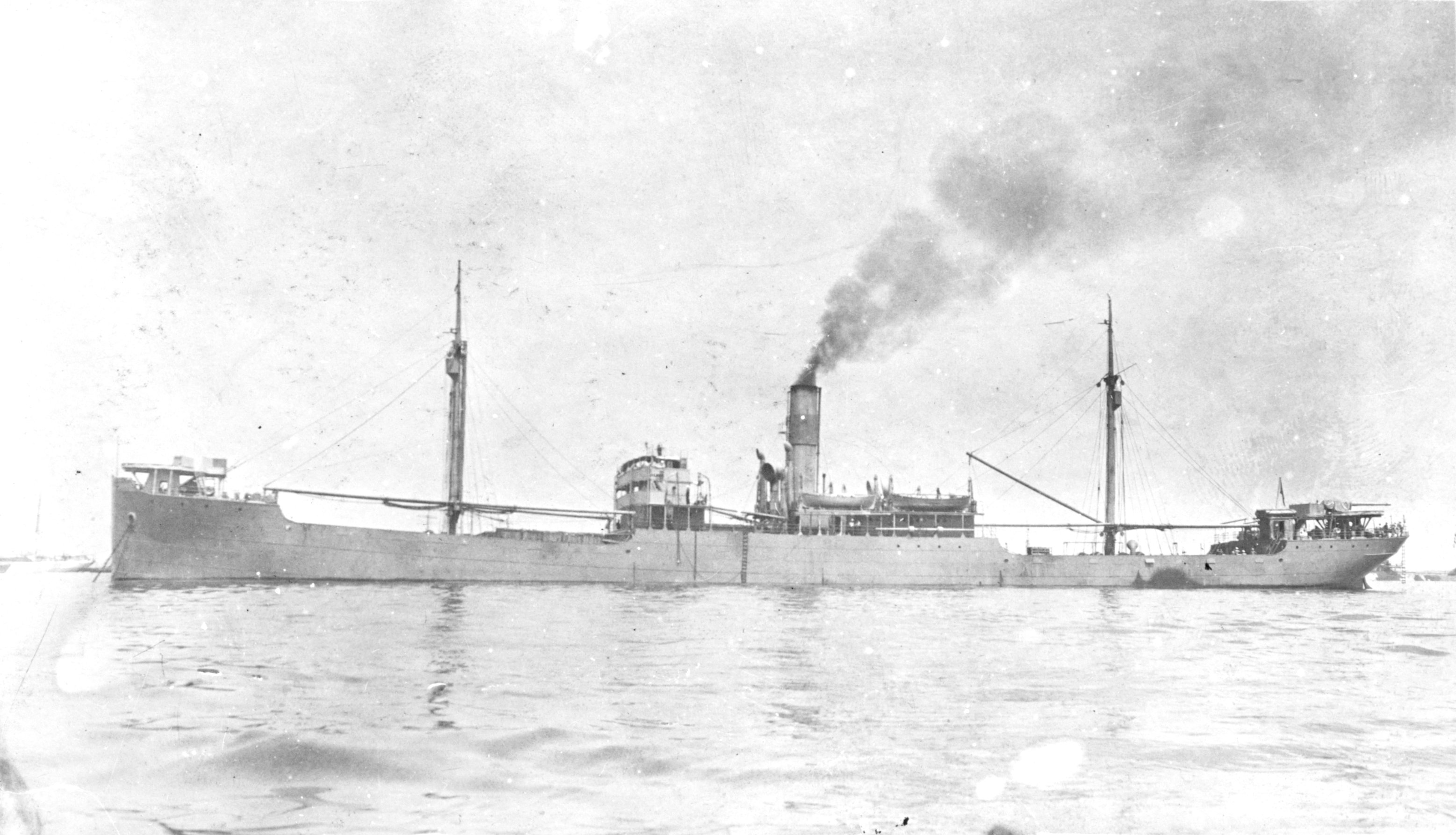
- USS Jeannette Skinner loading supplies at Hampton Roads, Virginia, in July 1918 during a voyage from Baltimore, Maryland, to France.

History

United States
- Name: USS Jeannette Skinner
- Namesake: Previous name retained
- Builder: Skinner and Eddy Corporation, Seattle, Washington
- Launched: 30 June 1917
- Completed: September 1917
- Acquired: 12 April 1918
- Commissioned: 12 April 1918
- Decommissioned: 10 June 1919
- Fate: Transferred to United States Shipping Board on 10 June 1919
- Notes: In commercial service as SS Jeannette Skinner 1919-1945; Scrapped August 1945

General characteristics
- Type: Cargo ship
- Tonnage: 5,715 GRT, 8,600 DWT
- Length: 423 ft 9 in (129.16 m)
- Beam: 54 ft (16 m)
- Draft: 24 ft 2 in (7.37 m)
- Propulsion: Steam engine
- Speed: 10 knots
- Complement: 32
- Armament: 1 × 6-inch (152-millimeter) gun, 1 × 6-pounder gun

USS Jeannette Skinner (ID-1321), sometimes spelled incorrectly as USS Jeanette Skinner, was a cargo ship that served in the United States Navy from 1918 to 1919.

== Construction ==
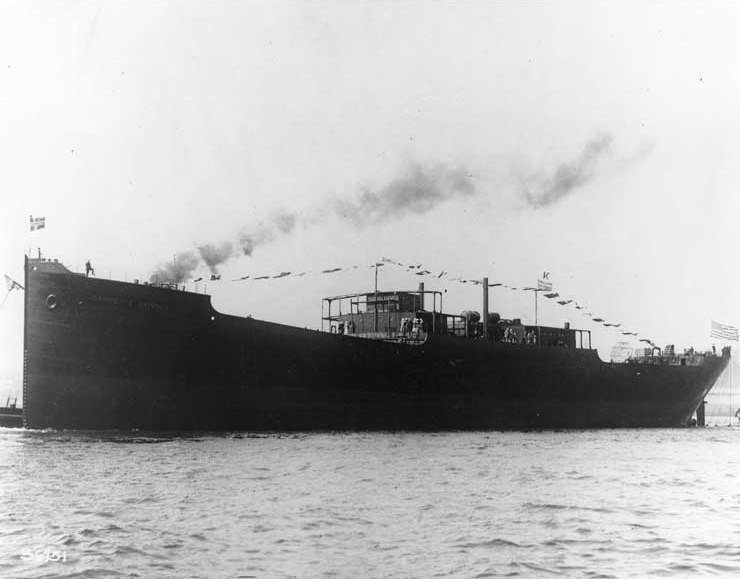
An incomplete Jeannette Skinner on 30 June 1917, immediately after her launching at the Skinner and Eddy Corporation shipyard at Seattle, Washington.

Jeannette Skinner was laid down as the commercial cargo ship J. M. Fox at Seattle by the Skinner and Eddy Corporation. Before she was launched, the Norwegian shipping firm Knut Knutsen OAS bought her and renamed her Jeannette Skinner. She was launched on 30 June 1917.

== Service history ==
=== 1917-1918 ===
Before she could be completed, Jeannette Skinner was commandeered for World War I service by the United States Shipping Board in August 1917. Completed in September 1917, she was placed in service for the next several months as a civilian cargo ship under Shipping Board control.

=== 1918-1919 ===
Jeannette Skinner was acquired by the U.S. Navy for World War I service on 12 April 1918, assigned naval registry Identification Number (Id. No.) 1321, and commissioned the same day as USS Jeannette Skinner.

Jeannette Skinner was assigned to the Naval Overseas Transportation Service to transport cargo from the United States to France. After loading a cargo of general United States Army supplies at Baltimore, Maryland, Jeannette Skinner departed New York City on 3 May 1918 with a convoy for Brest, France, where she arrived on 17 May 1918. Returning to New York in June, she loaded another U.S. Army cargo at Baltimore and delivered it at Brest and Bordeaux, France, in August 1918. Her third eastbound voyage took her from New York to La Pallice, France, and Bordeaux in September–October 1918.

While in the Gironde River in France on 27 November, 16 days after the end of the war, Jeannette Skinner was damaged in collision with the Japanese steamer Ceylon Maru. During her return voyage in December, she had to put in at Bermuda for fuel and, upon arrival at Baltimore, entered drydock to begin two months of repairs.

In March–April 1919 Jeannette Skinner carried a cargo of wheat, oats, and lard to Cette, France, via Gibraltar on behalf of the Southern Food Administration. Once again she had to refuel on her homeward voyage, this time in the Azores. She arrived at Baltimore on 2 June 1919.

Jeannette Skinner was decommissioned at Baltimore on 10 June 1919 and was returned to the Shipping Board the same day.

=== 1919-1945 ===
Once again SS Jeannette Skinner, the ship returned to commercial service. In 1937, the Shipping Board sold her to a British firm based in Shanghai, China. She was taken over by the British Ministry of War Transport for World War II service in August 1944, then transferred to the United States War Shipping Administration in December.

She was scrapped at Baltimore in August 1945.
