= USS Kestrel (AMc-5) =

Minesweeper of the United States Navy

History

United States
- Name: USS Kestrel
- Builder: Salisbury Yacht Co., Salisbury, Maryland
- Launched: 1938, as Chanco
- Acquired: 1 October 1940
- Commissioned: 21 January 1941
- Decommissioned: 29 October 1945
- Reclassified: IX-175, 10 July 1944
- Fate: Delivered to the War Shipping Administration, 5 August 1946

General characteristics
- Type: Coastal minesweeper
- Displacement: 219 long tons (223 t)
- Length: 98 ft 10 in (30.12 m)
- Beam: 21 ft 9 in (6.63 m)
- Draft: 6 ft 7 in (2.01 m)
- Speed: 11 knots (20 km/h; 13 mph)
- Complement: 19
- Armament: 2 × .30 caliber machine guns

USS Kestrel (AMc-5), was built in 1938 as Chanco by the Salisbury Yacht Co., Salisbury, Maryland. The yacht was acquired by the United States Navy on 1 October 1940, converted to a coastal minesweeper, and commissioned as USS Kestrel (AMc-5) on 21 January 1941.

== Service history ==
She was assigned to the 5th Naval District and operated on inshore patrol duty out of Norfolk, Virginia, until 11 January 1944. Sailing to Boston, Massachusetts, Kestrel performed similar duties in the 1st Naval District.

She was reclassified as Unclassified Miscellaneous Auxiliary Ship IX-175 on 10 July 1944 and operated for the remainder of her service as an experimental vessel for Radiation Laboratory, M.I.T., Cambridge, Massachusetts.

Kestrel was placed out of service on 29 October 1945 and delivered to the War Shipping Administration for disposal on 5 August 1946.
