= USS Joy (SP-643) =

Patrol vessel of the United States Navy

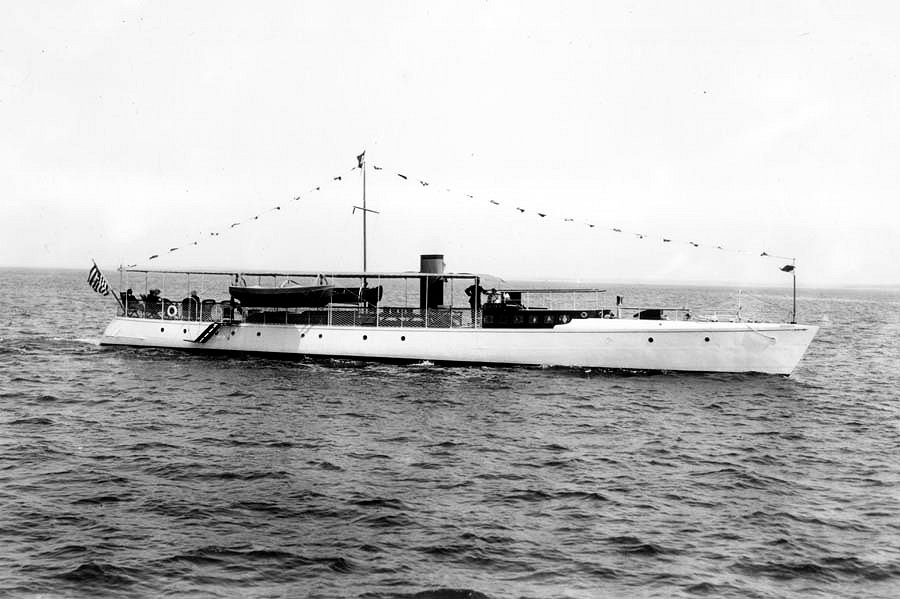
- Joy as a private yacht.

History

United States
- Name: USS Joy
- Namesake: Previous name retained
- Builder: B. F. Wood, City Island, the Bronx, New York
- Completed: 1905
- Acquired: June 1917
- Commissioned: 1917
- Decommissioned: 1918
- Fate: Returned to owner 6 May 1919
- Notes: Operated as private motor yacht Joy 1905–1917 and from 1919

General characteristics
- Type: Patrol vessel
- Tonnage: 41 gross register tons
- Length: 93 ft (28 m)
- Beam: 11 ft (3.4 m)
- Draft: 4 ft (1.2 m)
- Speed: 23 knots
- Complement: 12
- Armament: 1 × machine gun

USS Joy (SP-643) was a United States Navy patrol vessel in commission from 1917 to 1918.

Joy was built as a private motor yacht of the same name by B. F. Wood at City Island in the Bronx, New York, in 1905. In June 1917, the U.S. Navy acquired her from her owners, T. M. Jones and P. C. Kauffman of Newport, Rhode Island, for use as a section patrol boat during World War I. She was commissioned as USS Joy (SP-643) in 1917.

Assigned to the 2nd Naval District in southern New England, Joy performed patrol duty until declared unfit for service sometime in 1918.

Joy was returned to Jones and Kauffman on 6 May 1919.
