= USS Itasca (SP-810) =

Patrol vessel of the United States Navy

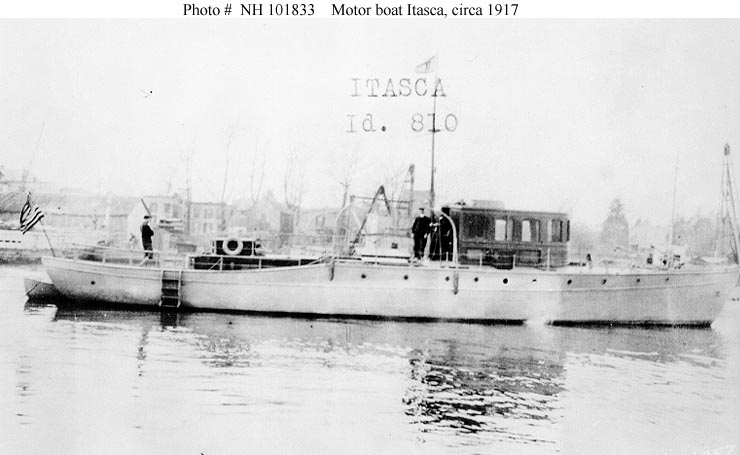
- Itasca as a private motorboat in 1917, just prior to her United States Navy service.

History

United States
- Name: USS Itasca (1917-1918); USS SP-810 (1918-1919)
- Namesake: Itasca was her previous name retained; SP-810 was her section patrol number
- Builder: Stamford Motor Construction Company, Stamford, Connecticut
- Completed: 1908
- Acquired: 10 August 1917
- Commissioned: July 1917 or 18 August 1917
- Renamed: SP-810 April 1918
- Fate: Returned to owner 26 February 1919
- Notes: Operated as private motorboat Itasca 1908-1917 and from 1919

General characteristics
- Type: Patrol vessel employed as hospital boat
- Tonnage: 42 Gross register tons
- Length: 75 ft (23 m)
- Beam: 15 ft (4.6 m)
- Draft: 4 ft 6 in (1.37 m)
- Speed: 12.5 knots
- Complement: 11
- Armament: 2 × 1-pounder guns; 1 × machine gun

The second USS Itasca (SP-810), later USS SP-810, was a United States Navy patrol vessel in commission from 1917 to 1919 which was employed as a hospital boat.

Itasca was built as a private wooden motorboat of the same name in 1908 by the Stamford Motor Construction Company at Stamford, Connecticut. In 1917, the U.S. Navy leased her from her owner, Henry Henke, for use as a section patrol boat during World War I. Sources differ on her commissioning date, claiming both that the Navy took control of her from Henke at Norfolk, Virginia, on 10 August 1917 and commissioned her as USS Itasca (SP-810) on 18 August 1918, and that she was commissioned in July 1917.

Although armed for use as a patrol boat, Itasca served as a hospital boat in the Norfolk area for the rest of World War I and into early 1919. She was renamed USS SP-810 in April 1918.

SP-810 was returned to Henke on 26 February 1919.
