= USS Kestrel II =

Patrol vessel of the United States Navy

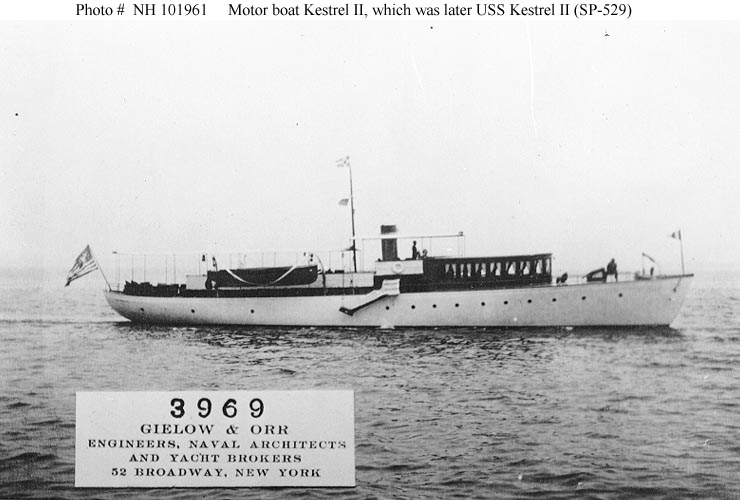
- Kestrel II as a private yacht sometime between 1912 and 1917.

History

United States
- Name: USS Kestrel II
- Namesake: Previous name retained
- Builder: Percy Tuttle, Greenport, New York
- Completed: 1912
- Acquired: 2 June 1917
- Commissioned: 4 June 1917
- Decommissioned: 6 January 1919
- Fate: Returned to owner 6 January 1919
- Notes: Operated as private yacht Kestrel II 1912-1917 and from 1919

General characteristics
- Type: Patrol vessel
- Tonnage: 93 gross register tons
- Length: 108 ft 6 in (33.07 m)
- Beam: 18 ft (5.5 m)
- Draft: 8 ft 6 in (2.59 m)
- Speed: 12 knots
- Complement: 9
- Armament: 1 × 3-pounder gun

USS Kestrel II (SP-529) was a United States Navy patrol vessel in commission from 1917 to 1918.

Kestrel II was built in 1912 as a private motor yacht of the same name by Percy Tuttle at Greenport on Long Island, New York, for D. Herbert Hostetter of New York City. On 2 June 1917, the U.S. Navy acquired her from her owner for use as a section patrol vessel during World War I. She was commissioned as USS Kestrel II (SP-529) on 4 June 1917 at Newport, Rhode Island.

Assigned to the 2nd Naval District and based at New London, Connecticut, Kestrel II operated on patrol duties in Long Island Sound for the rest of World War I.

Kestrel II was decommissioned on 6 January 1919 and returned to her owner the same day.
