= Inca (disambiguation) =

The Inca Empire was the largest empire in pre-Columbian America.

Inca, Inka, or İncə may also refer to:

- Inca civilization, centered in what is now Peru
- Inca people, the people of the Inca Empire
- Quechua people, the people of the Inca civilization
- Inca language, the Quechuan languages
- Sapa Inca or Inka, the main ruler of the Inca Empire

== People ==
- Glacinei Martins or Inca (born 1973), Brazilian footballer
- Edwin Valero or El Inca (1981-2010), Venezuela boxer
- Inca Garcilaso de la Vega or El Inca (1539–1616), Spanish Peruvian writer
- INCA (singer) (born 1985), French singer
- Inka, nom de guerre of Danuta Siedzikówna (1928–1946), Polish national heroine, medical orderly in the Home Army
- Inka Bause (born 1968), German singer, TV presenter and actress
- Inka Essenhigh (born 1969), American painter
- Inka Friedrich (born 1965), German actress
- Inka Grings (born 1978), German footballer
- Inka Parei (born 1967), German writer
- Inka Wesely (born 1991), German footballer

== Places ==
- Inka (La Paz), a mountain in the La Paz Department, Bolivia
- İncə, Goychay, Azerbaijan
- İncə, Shaki, Azerbaijan
- Inca, Spain, a town on the island of Majorca in the Mediterranean Sea

== Transportation ==
- Los Incas - Parque Chas (Buenos Aires Underground), metro subway station
- SEAT Inca, a panel van
- Industri Kereta Api (INKA), a rolling stock manufacturer in Indonesia

=== Ships ===
- Inca (schooner), the first five-masted schooner built on the United States western coast, in 1896
- USS Inca, U.S. Navy ship name
  - USS Inca (1898), a screw steamer
  - USS Inca (1911), a steam ferry
  - USS Inca (SP-1212), a motor boat built in 1917
  - USS Inca (ID-3219), an iron tugboat built in 1879
  - USS Inca (IX-229), an unclassified miscellaneous vessel

== Biology ==
- Inca (beetle), a genus of beetles in the subfamily Cetoniinae
- Inca (hummingbird), the common name for several hummingbirds in the genus Coeligena

== Computing ==
- Inca (video game), a 1992 adventure game by Coktel Vision
- INCA (software), measurement, calibration and diagnostic software published by ETAS
- INCA Internet, South Korean company
- International Newspaper Colour Association (INCA), an early constituent of the World Association of Newspapers

== Food ==
- Inka (drink), a Polish roasted grain drink
- Inca Kola, a carbonated soft drink from Peru

== Other uses ==
- Information Council of the Americas, a right-wing anti-communist propaganda group
- Inka (dharma), dharma transmission in Zen Buddhism
- El Inca (film), 2016 Venezuelan drama film directed by Ignacio Castillo Cottin
- Los Incas, Andean folk music group
- Inka shōmei, a form of dharma transmission in Zen Buddhism
- Ion and Neutral Camera (INCA), an instrument aboard the Cassini–Huygens spacecraft
- Inca (Thai band), a Thai folk rock band

== See also ==
- Incan (disambiguation)
- CNIB Foundation (French: INCA)
- INCAA
- INKAS, Canadian armoured transport, strongbox, security services company
- Quechua (disambiguation)
