= USS Inca =

USS Inca is a name used more than once by the U.S. Navy:

- USS Inca (1898), a screw steamer, was built in 1898 by George Lawley & Son, South Boston, Massachusetts.
- USS Inca (1911), a steam ferry, was built for the Navy by Herreshoff Manufacturing Co., Bristol, Rhode Island, in 1911.
- USS Inca (SP-1212), a motor boat, built in 1917 by Herreshoff Manufacturing Co., Bristol, Rhode Island.
- USS Inca (ID-3219), an iron tugboat, was built in 1879 by J. H. Dialogue & Sons, Camden, New Jersey.
- USS Inca (IX-229), an unclassified miscellaneous vessel, would have been the fifth ship of the United States Navy to be named for the Inca Empire if she had received that name.
