= Mobile Seamen's Club Building =

Historic district in Mobile, Alabama

- U.S. National Register of Historic Places
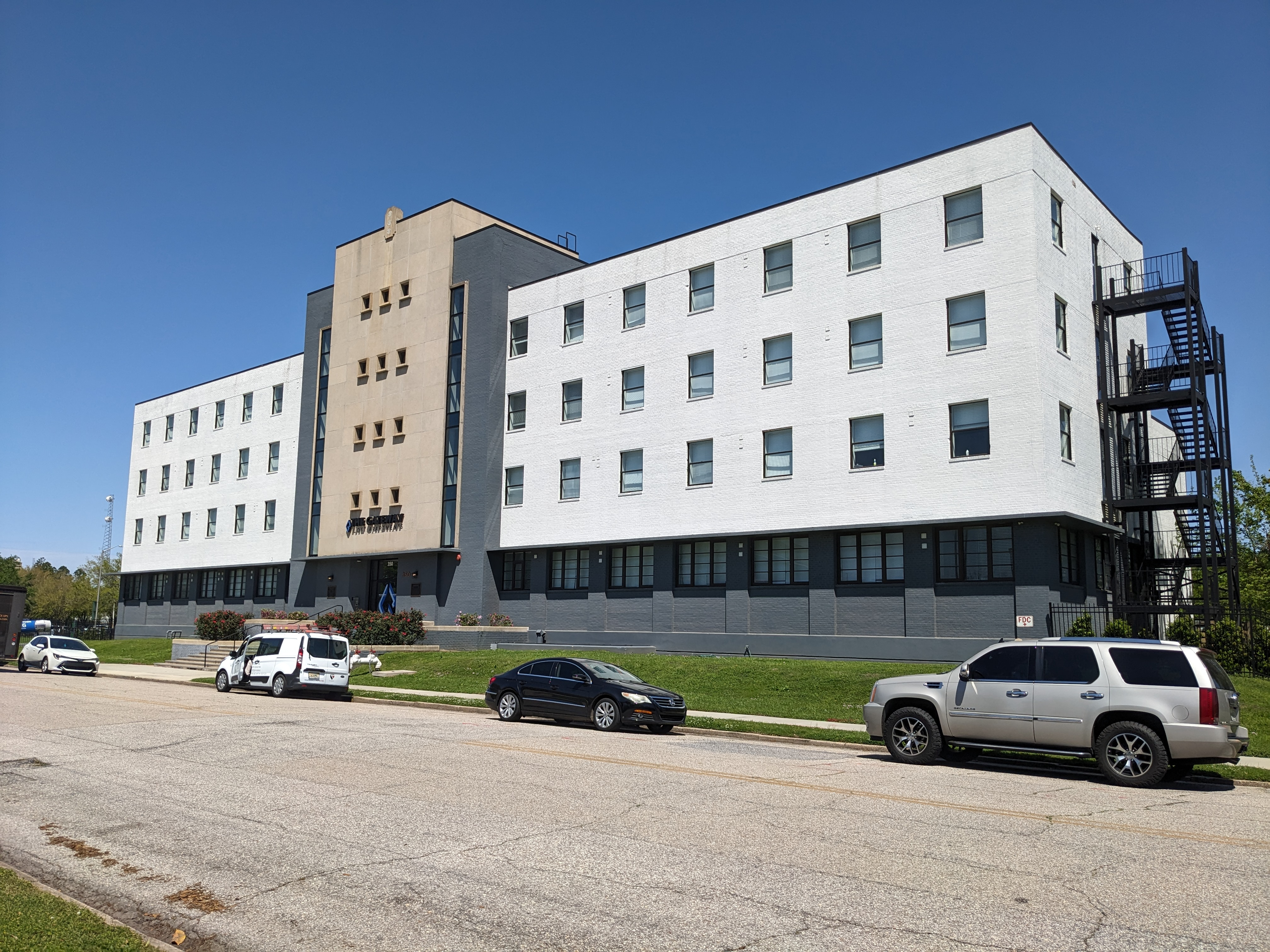
- The building in March 2024
- Interactive map of Mobile Seamen's Club Building
- Location: 350 St. Joseph St., Mobile, Alabama
- Coordinates: 30°41′55″N 88°02′42″W
- Built: 1949
- Architect: John Platt Roberts
- NRHP reference No.: 100004131
- Added to NRHP: October 16, 2020

The Mobile Seamen's Club Building is a historic building in Mobile, Alabama. It was listed on the National Register of Historic Places in 2020.

== History ==
The Seamen's Club was built in 1949 to serve as short-term housing for workers in the maritime and shipping industries. Its construction was supported by both the Seafarers International Union and the Waterman Steamship Corporation. The building is close to both the docks and to the downtown core, providing ease of access to both and a link between transient seamen and the city at large. In segregation-era Alabama, the club was only open to white seamen. A separate location for Black seamen was opened a few blocks away, near the International Longshoreman's Association Hall.

The building was sold to the Seafarers Union in 1970, who used it for their meeting hall and offices. The city of Mobile purchased the building in 1980, and utilized it for offices; the building became known as "City Hall North". The city vacated the building in 2003, and it sat on the market until 2017. In 2020, it was redeveloped into apartments.

== Architecture ==
The four-story structure was built in International Style with Art Deco elements. It is juxtaposed in style to its immediate neighborhood, the De Tonti Square Historic District, one of Mobile's oldest neighborhoods. The first floor is recessed and clad in concrete, which gave visual weight to the yellow brick upper floors; the building was painted white during the 2020 renovation. A concrete tower separates the façade into two wings. The ground floor contained a chapel, library, recreation room, and lunch counter, while the basement had a barber shop, a storage room with lockers for rent, as well as the building's mechanical equipment. The three upper floors served a lodging for seamen, with the second floor reserved for those traveling with their families.

The building was designed by Mobile architect John Platt Roberts, who also designed the Spanish Colonial Revival Paterson House (1926) and Azalea Court Apartments (1928), the Tudor Revival Ross Knox House (1929), and the International style Waterman–Smith Building (1945).
