= USS Inca (IX-229) =

Liberty ship launched in 1943

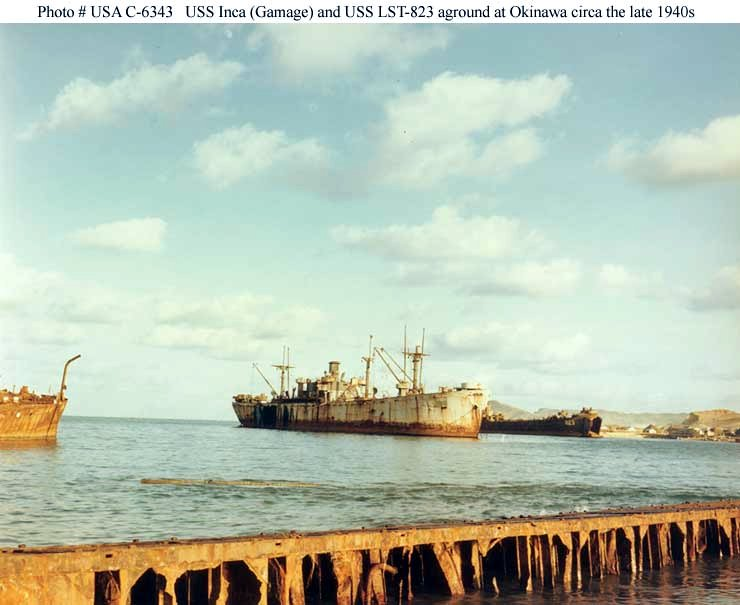
- USS Inca (Gamage) aground at Okinawa awaiting scrapping.

History

United States
- Name: William B. Allison; Inca
- Namesake: William B. Allison; The Inca Empire
- Owner: War Shipping Administration (WSA)
- Operator: Waterman Steamship Corporation; United States Navy
- Builder: California Shipbuilding Corporation, Los Angeles, California
- Laid down: 8 February 1943 as SS William B. Allison
- Launched: 8 March 1943
- Completed: 24 March 1943
- Acquired: 24 March 1943
- Commissioned: 30 July 1945
- Decommissioned: 12 March 1946
- In service: 19 August 1943
- Out of service: 8 February 1946
- Renamed: S.S. William B. Allison; USS Inca (IX-229); USS Gamage (IX-227)
- Stricken: 12 March 1946
- Honors and awards: Asiatic-Pacific Campaign Medal, World War II Victory Medal
- Fate: Sold for scrapping 19 February 1948 to China Merchants & Engineers, Inc.

General characteristics
- Class & type: MCtype EC2-S-C1 hull
- Type: Liberty Ship
- Displacement: 4,023 tons(lt) 14,250 tons(fl)
- Length: 441 ft 6 in (134.57 m)
- Beam: 56 ft 11 in (17.35 m)
- Draft: 27 ft 9 in (8.46 m)
- Propulsion: Two oil-fired boilers; Triple-expansion steam engine; Single screw; 2,500 hp (1,864 kW)
- Speed: 11 knots (20 km/h; 13 mph)
- Range: 17,000 mi (27,000 km)
- Capacity: 9,140 tons cargo
- Complement: 41
- Armament: 1 × Stern-mounted 4 in (100 mm) deck gun

USS Inca, a 3,381-ton (light displacement) "Liberty" ship, was launched in March 1943 in Los Angeles, California, and entered merchant service later the same month as SS William B. Allison, MCE hull 724. Two years later she would be taken into US Navy as a stores ship and renamed USS Inca (IX-229). For much of her service as Inca she was also named USS Gamage (IX-227) because of bureaucratic confusion.

== Service history ==
William B. Allison was laid down by California Shipbuilding Corporation, Los Angeles, California on 8 February 1943, and launched on February 10, 1943, under a Maritime Commission (MARCOM) contract under the Emergency Shipbuilding program. She was named after William B. Allison, (March 2, 1829 – August 4, 1908) a politician and leader of the Iowa Republican Party and became a United States House of Representatives member. He supported Abraham Lincoln for President of the United States. William B. Allison was built for the War Shipping Administration (WSA), who allocated the ship to Waterman Steamship Corporation for operation as a World War II United States Merchant Navy ship. William B. Allison took supplies to the troops fighting in the Pacific War, including supplies to Naval Base Okinawa.

On 25 May 1945, she was damaged by an aircraft torpedo off Nakagusuku Wan, Okinawa, killing 8 crew members and wounding two. She was towed into port and declared a constructive total loss, not suitable for repair. On 25 July 1945, based on a recommendation from the local War Shipping Administration (WSA) official, the Chief of Naval Operations (CNO) authorized Commander Service Division (ComServDiv) 104 to accept the ship "as is" at Okinawa and place her in service for non-self propelled floating dry storage. ComServDiv 104 accepted her at Okinawa on 30 July and on 6 August the Secretary of the Navy (SECNAV) approved the name Inca and designator IX-229 for her. She was converted to a storage ship by USS Vestal (AR-4) and USS Zaniah (AG-70), and was in Buckner Bay, Okinawa, when typhoons struck on 16 September and 9 October 1945. During the September typhoon she was hit by a merchant ship and suffered topside damage that was considered repairable, and she continued to issue supplies to ships in the bay. During the October typhoon she broke adrift and was one of several ships that USS Nestor (ARB-6) reported nearly hit her as Nestor was inexorably being driven ashore. Inca went aground during the storm and remained aground afterwards, but plans to survey her in late October were canceled and she appears to have remained in service as a storage ship into December.

== Name confusion ==
Inca was placed in the category "grounded ships, salvage not warranted" on 2 January 1946, and on 12 January 1946 ComServDiv 104 reported that the ship was no longer required, that an informal inspection indicated needed repairs were too extensive, and asked that she be returned to WSA. In turn, the Commander in Chief, Pacific (CINCPAC) asked CNO what disposition was desired for Inca. CNO's response of 15 January, "above incorrect," was probably the first clear indication received in the Pacific that the name and designation they had been using for this ship for the past five months were wrong. Back in early July 1945 the Navy had planned to take over another damaged Liberty ship, Henry L. Abbott, for self-propelled floating storage of lubricants and drummed petroleum products at Ulithi, and on 14 July SECNAV approved the name Gamage and designation IX-227 for the ex-Henry L. Abbott. On 21 July, however, CNO wrote to the War Shipping Administration and asked that his request of 13 July for the Henry L. Abbott be canceled, because her poor hull condition made her unsuitable for use as dry cargo floating storage. CNO had already advised CINCPAC a day earlier of the cancellation of Henry L. Abbott. The Navy later decided to shift the name Gamage and the designation IX-227 to the ex-William B. Allison and cancel the name and number given to that ship on 6 August. This directive has not come to light in the archives, and the cryptic question sent to CINCPAC by CNO on 17 August, "Request information re acceptances William B. Allison for Gamage (IX-227) in lieu of Henry L. Abbott" appears to have gone unappreciated when CINCPAC on 24 August and again on 4 September reported the 30 July acceptance. The ex-William B. Allison was consistently called Inca in all reporting from the Pacific Theater through mid-January 1946, and a photograph of her ashore at Buckner Bay appears to show the hull number IX-229 painted on her bow.

== Disposition ==
On 15 January 1946, CNO directed that the ship be redelivered to WSA. She was placed out of service on 8 February 1946, when she was reported lying on the bottom in Yonabaru Wan, Buckner Bay, Okinawa, with water in the holds up to the tween-decks. and was stricken from the Navy List on 12 March 1946. On 26 February, CNO told the naval base at Okinawa that WSA Okinawa was authorized to accept redelivery, but on 27 March the Okinawa naval base replied that WSA Okinawa refused to accept delivery without a specific directive from WSA Washington. The ship was finally redelivered to War Shipping Administration as she lay on 6 April 1946. The Maritime Commission sold her under her merchant name, William B. Allison, with seven other Okinawa wrecks, including USS Ocelot (IX-110), Vandalia (IX-191) and five civilian Liberty ships, to China Merchants and Engineers, Inc., for scrap. The ships were delivered to the buyer on 19 February 1948 under the condition that they be scrapped within two years and three months. An extension was later granted, and the scrapping of all the ships except one of the civilian vessels was reported complete on 31 January 1952. Not worth repairing, William B. Allison was scrapped in China in 1948.
