= CKH =

CKH may refer to

- Eastern Nazarene College, Campus Kinder Haus
- CKH, stock symbol for SEACOR Holdings
- Cook Islands, ITU code CKH
