= Seacor Lee =

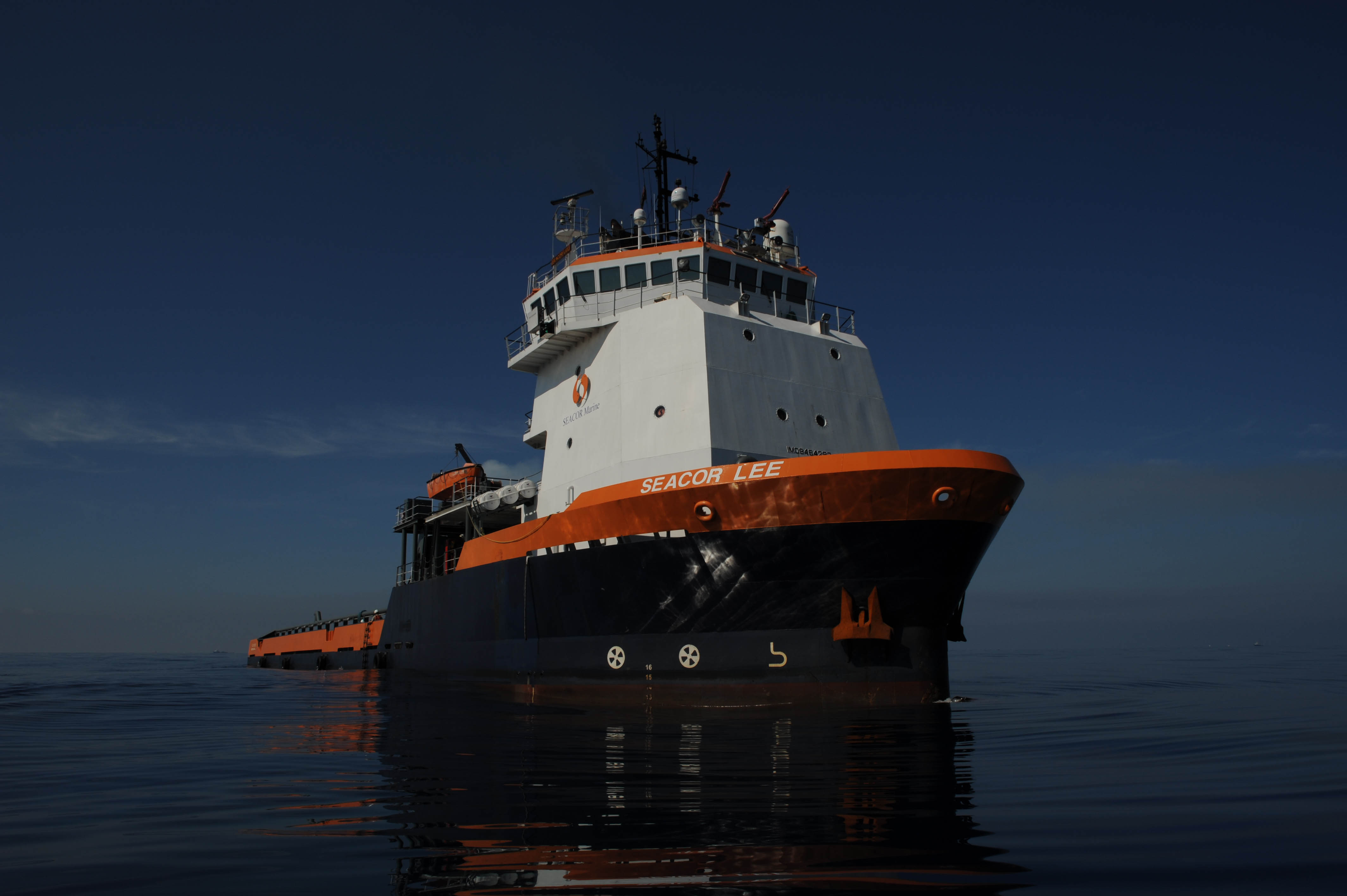

History
- Name: Seacor Lee
- Owner: Seacor Holdings
- Operator: Seacor Holdings
- Port of registry: United States, New Orleans
- Builder: Bender Shipbuilding & Repair; Mobile, Alabama
- Laid down: 28 December 2006
- Completed: 24 October 2008
- Identification: ABS class no: 08169576; Call sign: WDE4932; IMO number: 9464297; MMSI number: 367362000
- Status: Operational

General characteristics
- Class & type: ABS: A1, Towing Vessel, Offshore Support Vessel
- Tonnage: 2,188 GT; 829 NT; 2,089 DWT
- Length: 80 m (260 ft)
- Beam: 15 m (49 ft)
- Capacity: Freshwater 982.6 m^{3} (34,700 cu ft); Fuel oil 600.4 m^{3} (21,200 cu ft); Hydraulic oil 2.9 m^{3} (100 cu ft); Lube oil 11.7 m^{3} (410 cu ft); Ballast tanks 256.9 m^{3} (9,070 cu ft)

Seacor Lee is a United States-flagged offshore support vessel, which formerly served as the offshore command and control for the Unified Command Center's Deepwater Horizon oil spill response. It is owned and operated by SEACOR Holdings.
