= INKA =

INKA refers to:

- Inka (drink), a Polish drink
- Industri Kereta Api (INKA), an Indonesian rolling stock manufacturer

== See also ==
- Inca (disambiguation)
