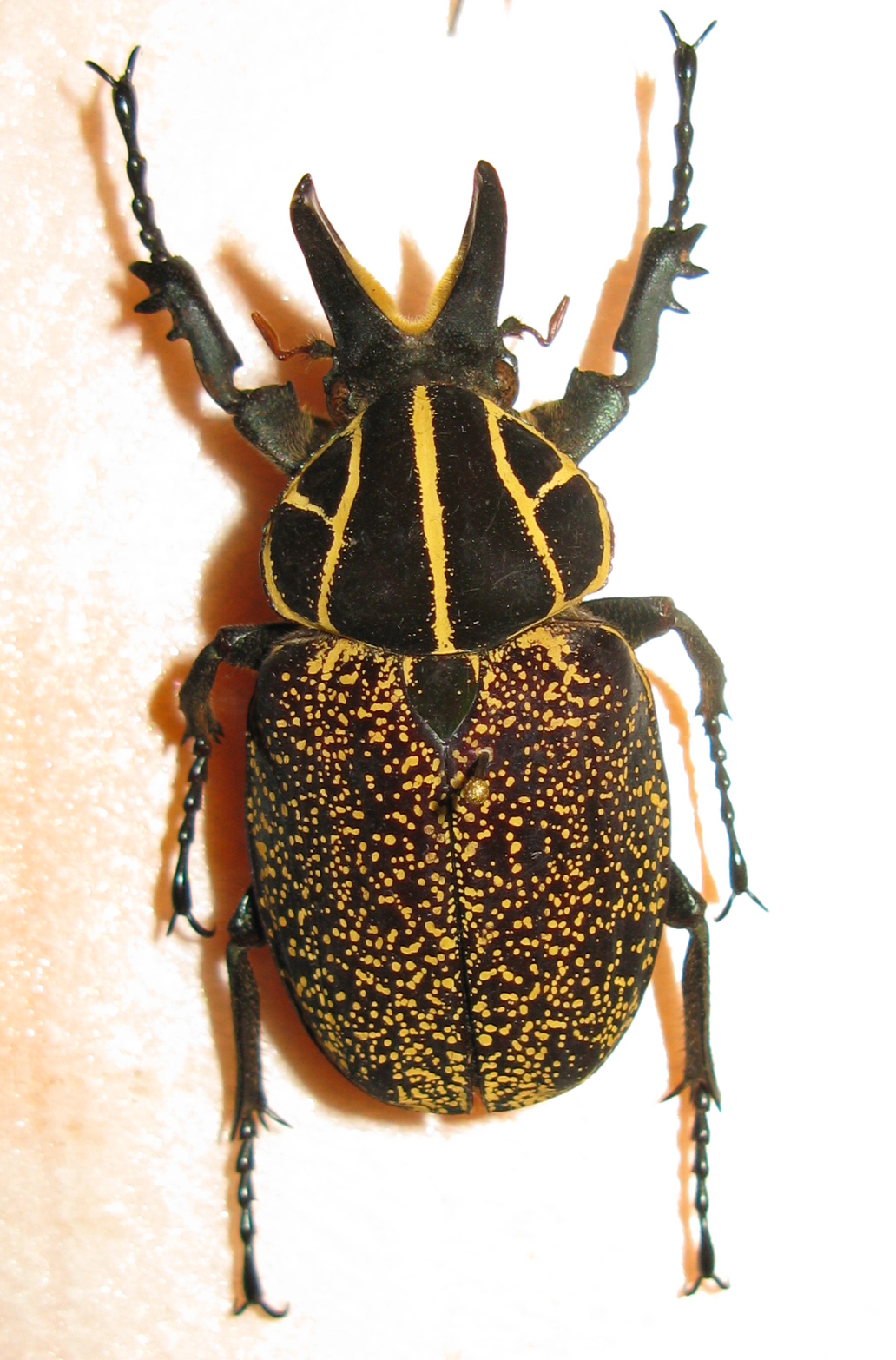

Scientific classification
- Kingdom: Animalia
- Phylum: Arthropoda
- Clade: Pancrustacea
- Class: Insecta
- Order: Coleoptera
- Suborder: Polyphaga
- Infraorder: Scarabaeiformia
- Family: Scarabaeidae
- Genus: Inca
- Species: I. clathratus

Binomial name
- Inca clathratus (Olivier, 1789)

Synonyms
- Cetonia clathrata Olivier, 1792; Cetonia ynca Weber, 1801; Inca weberi LePeletier & Serville, 1828; Inca fabricii Perty, 1830

= Inca clathratus =

Species of beetle

Inca clathratus is a species of flower chafer in the family Scarabaeidae, indigenous to Central and South America. These beetles can be seen surrounding the sap flows from injured or diseased trees anytime in the day and sometimes at night. They mostly feed at the sap flows of the trees, including avocado and mango trees. Like other beetles they also feed off of rotting fruit. There are a few different subspecies of Inca clathratus including: Inca clathratus sommeri, Inca clathratus clathratus, and Inca clathratus quesneli. The species name has been frequently misspelled as "clathrata" but the genus name Inca is masculine.

== Traits of Inca clathratus quesneli ==
Male : Length is 37.5 mm for the typical male but can range from 34.1 to 43.9 mm (which is small compared to the largest rhinoceros beetle, Dynastes hercules, which is about 17 cm in length.), horns are usually 5.5mm in length, width of body is normally about 19.3mm but can vary from 16 to 20.3 mm Color is typically black but can vary from black to dark brown and have metallic green on the thorax. The pronotum usually has white markings ranging from weak to strong. The scutellum is black and in some cases spotted. The elytra also have a range of density in spotting. The pygidium has white bands.

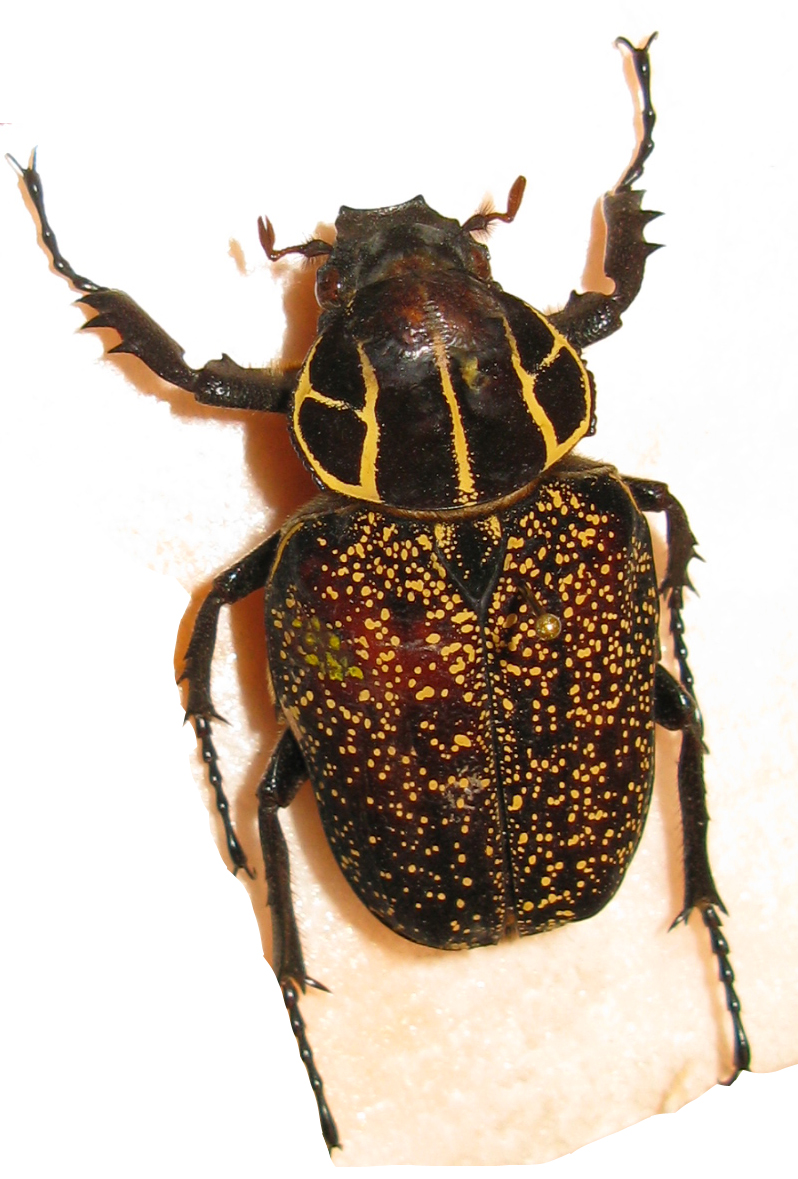
Female

Female : Range in length from 30.7 to 44.4 mm normal length is 42.4 mm. The typical width is 19.4 mm but can range from 13.8 to 19.5 mm. Horns are absent from head but instead clypeus is concave. Pronotum has marginal bead, largest in center and then gradually smaller in front and in rear, also with white markings either vague or well defined. Elytra have spots from small to large.
