= USS Nestor =

LST turned repair ship

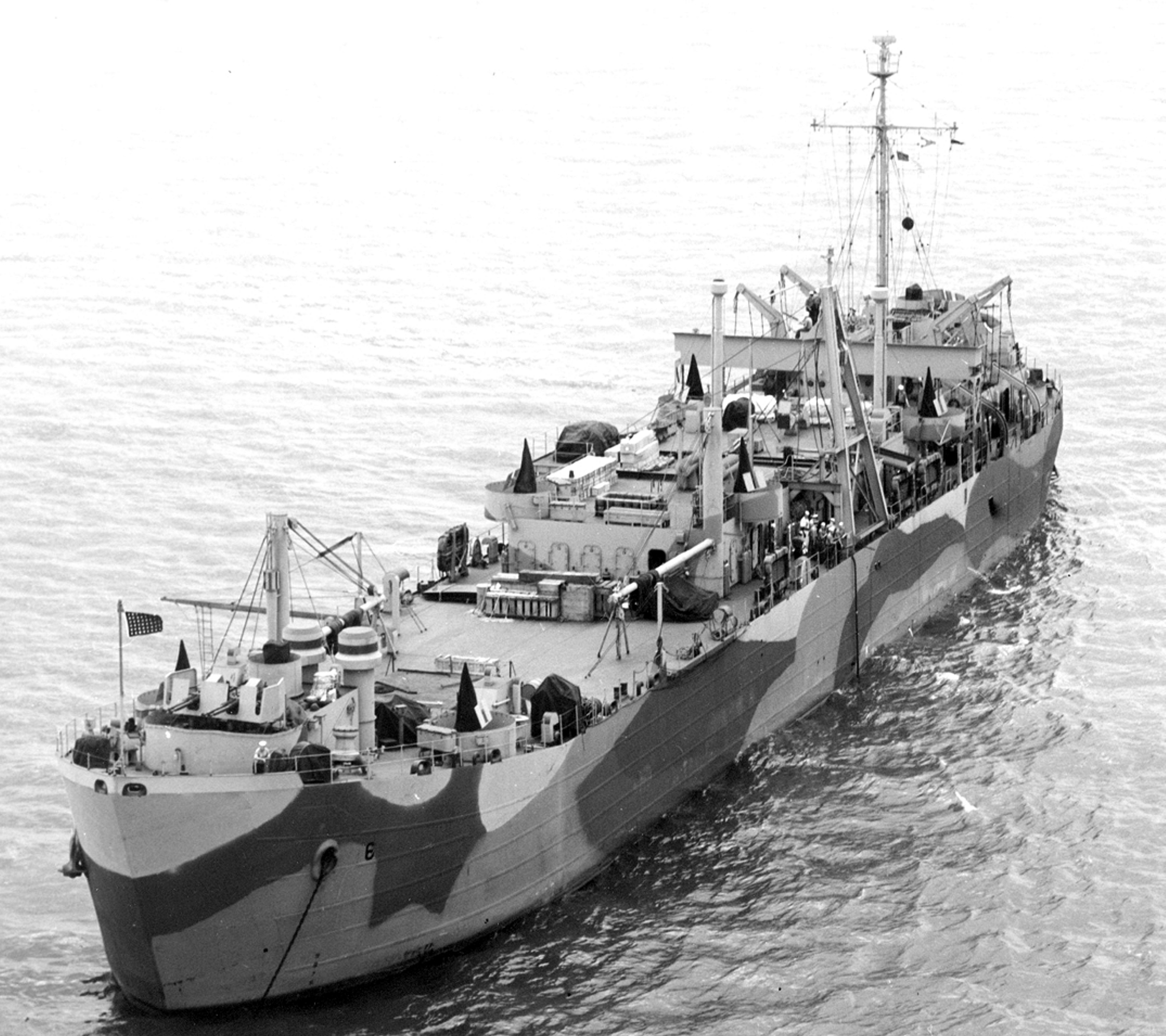
- USS Nestor (ARB-6), at anchor probably in Hampton Roads, Virginia, in July 1944.

History

United States
- Name: LST-518; Nestor
- Namesake: Nestor
- Builder: Chicago Bridge & Iron Company, Seneca, Illinois
- Laid down: 13 September 1943
- Launched: 20 January 1944
- Commissioned: 24 June 1944
- Decommissioned: 29 November 1945
- Reclassified: Battle Damage Repair Ship, 3 November 1943
- Stricken: 3 January 1946
- Identification: Hull symbol: LST-518; Hull symbol: ARB-6; Code letters: NJLJ
- Honors and awards: 1 × battle star (World War II)
- Fate: Sold for scrap, May 1947

General characteristics
- Class & type: LST-491-class tank landing ship; Aristaeus-class battle damage repair ship
- Displacement: 1,781 long tons (1,810 t) (light); 4,100 long tons (4,200 t) (full)
- Length: 328 ft (100 m) oa
- Beam: 50 ft (15 m)
- Draft: 11 ft 2 in (3.40 m)
- Installed power: 2 × 900 hp (670 kW) Electro-Motive Diesel 12-567A diesel engines; 1,700 shp (1,300 kW)
- Propulsion: 1 × Falk main reduction gears; 2 × Propellers
- Speed: 11.6 kn (21.5 km/h; 13.3 mph)
- Complement: 20 officers, 234 enlisted men
- Armament: 1 × 3 in (76 mm)/50 caliber gun; 2 × quad 40 mm (1.57 in) Bofors guns; 8 × 20 mm (0.79 in) Oerlikon cannons

Service record
- Operations: Assault and occupation of Okinawa Gunto (16 April–30 June 1945)
- Awards: American Campaign Medal; Asiatic–Pacific Campaign Medal; World War II Victory Medal; Navy Occupation Service Medal w/Asia Clasp

USS Nestor (ARB-6) was planned as a United States Navy LST-491-class tank landing ship, but was redesignated as one of twelve Aristaeus-class battle damage repair ships built for the United States Navy during World War II. Named for Nestor (in Greek mythology, the son of Neleus, the King of Pylos and Chloris), she was the only US Naval vessel to bear the name.

== Construction ==
Laid down as LST-518 on 13 September 1943, by the Chicago Bridge and Iron Company of Seneca, Illinois; launched 20 January 1944; sponsored by Miss Rita Jenkins; converted by the Maryland Drydock Company of Baltimore, Maryland; and commissioned 24 June 1944.

== Service history ==
Designed to make emergency repairs in forward areas to battle-damaged ships, Nestor left Norfolk 4 August 1944, for Guantanamo Bay, the Panama Canal, and Ulithi, arriving 21 October, to take up her primary mission. During the next five and a half months she acted as tender to small craft and repaired all types of naval vessels from battleships to LCIs.

Nestor left Ulithi 19 April 1945, for Kerama Retto, seized in the initial phase of the Okinawa campaign at Naval Base Okinawa, to serve as a base for the ships engaged in the main assault. Japanese air attacks, often by suicide plane, inflicted heavy damage on the fleet, and Nestor worked round-the-clock, often under fire herself, to help keep the fighting ships in action. As Okinawa itself became secure, Nestor entered Buckner Bay 10 July, and continued her vital services, which here included the tremendous task of building a cofferdam. Nestor was driven aground by wind and heavy seas in the devastating Typhoon "Louise" of 9 October, and had to be abandoned. She decommissioned on 29 November, was stricken on 3 January 1946, and her hulk was sold for scrap on 1 May 1947.

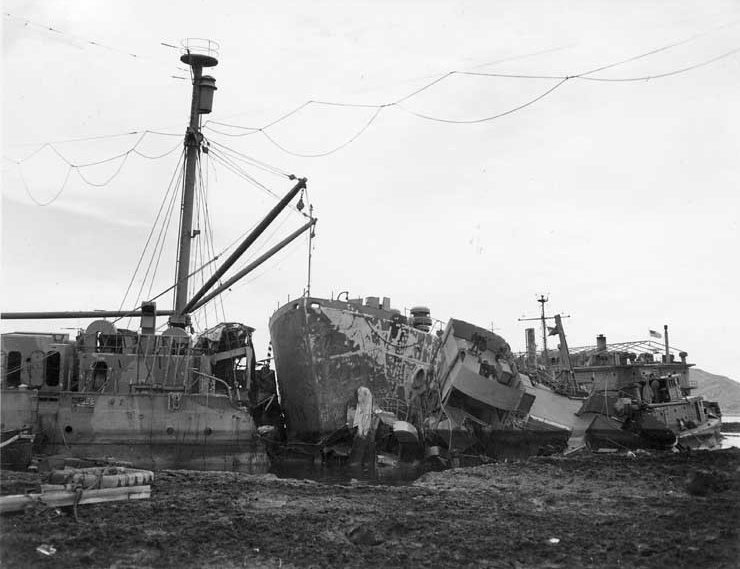
Nestor driven aground at Buckner Bay, Okinawa, by wind and heavy seas during Typhoon "Louise", 9 October 1945. The aftermath of the typhoon found this jumble of ships with Nestor's bow (center of photo) through the stern of Ocelot. Note the YTB alongside.

In November 1945 the CNO directed that the hulk be sunk or destroyed, but this was not done and she became one of around 15 Okinawa typhoon wrecks that were finally sold for scrap in two batches in May and November 1947 by the State Department's Foreign Liquidations Commission. Nestor along with LST-823, LST-826, three floating docks, and some smaller craft, were included in the May batch and were purchased by the Oklahoma-Philippines Company in what was referred to as the "Berry sale". The date of her scrapping is not known.

== Awards ==
Nestor earned one battle star for World War II service.

== Bibliography ==
Online resources

- "Nestor". Dictionary of American Naval Fighting Ships. Naval History and Heritage Command. 12 August 2015. This article incorporates text from this source, which is in the public domain.
- "USS Nestor (ARB-6)". NavSource. 4 December 2015.
