= Incan (disambiguation) =

Incan is of or pertaining to the Incas, their culture or empire, the Inca Empire.

Incan may also refer to:

- of or pertaining to Inca, Spain
- Incan berries (also called golden berries), popular with some vegans
- Inca people, the people of the Incan Empire
- Quechua people, the people of the Incan civilization
- Incan language, the language of the Incas

== See also ==
- Inca (disambiguation)
- Inkan (Japanese: 印鑑) seals (stamps)
- Quechua (disambiguation)
