= Richards DAR House =

Historic house in Alabama, United States

- U.S. Historic district – Contributing property
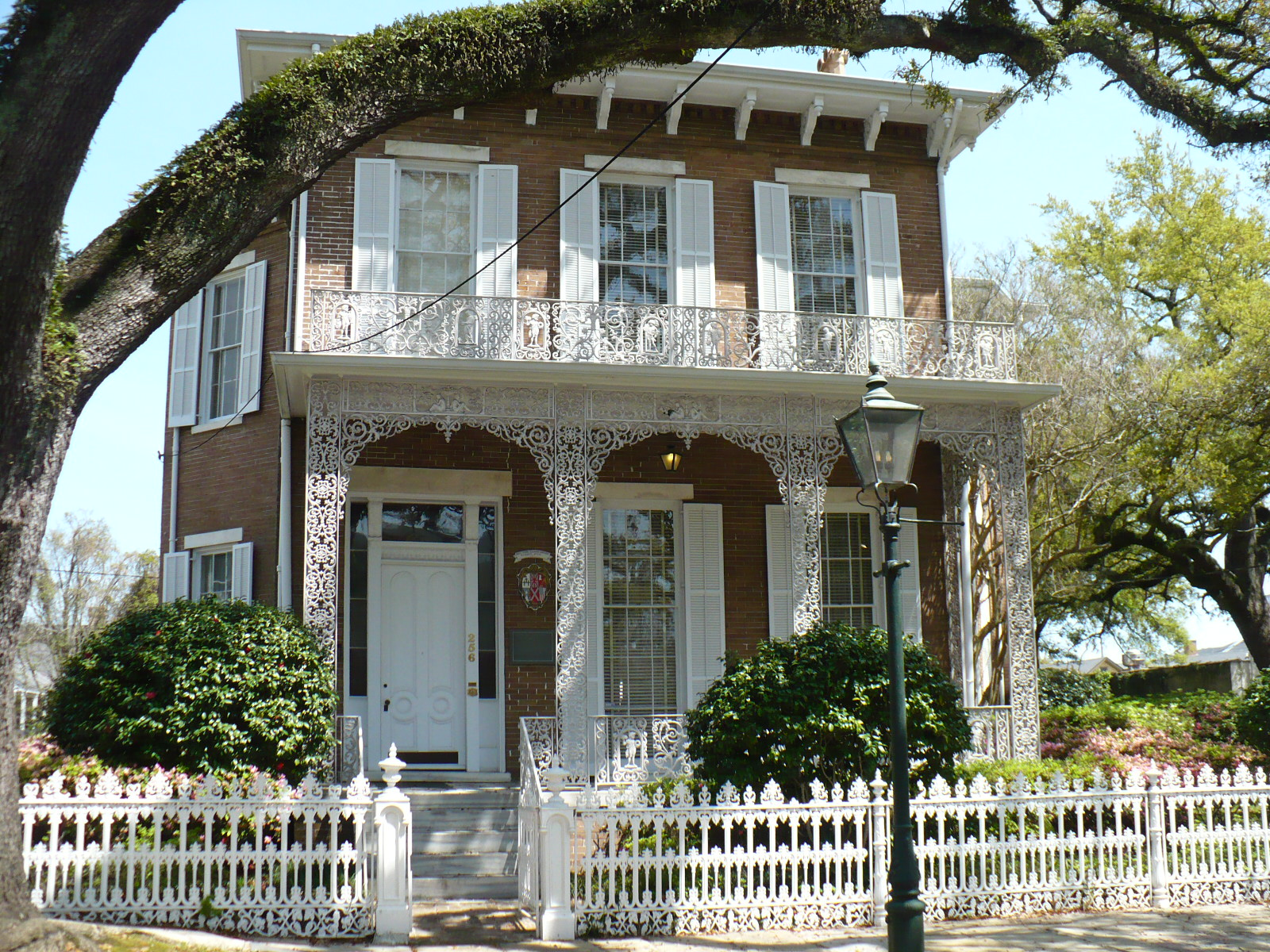
- The Richards DAR House in 2008

- Location within Alabama
- Interactive map showing the location of Richards DAR House
- Location: Mobile, Alabama
- Coordinates: 30°41′45″N 88°2′44″W
- Built: 1860
- Architectural style: Italianate
- Part of: De Tonti Square Historic District (ID72000169)
- Designated CP: February 7, 1972

The Richards DAR House is a historic house museum in Mobile, Alabama, United States. The Italianate style house was completed in 1860 for Charles and Caroline Richards. It is a contributing property to the De Tonti Square Historic District, which was listed on the National Register of Historic Places on February 7, 1972. The four Daughters of the American Revolution (DAR) chapters in Mobile jointly operate and maintain the house. It is noted by architectural historians as one of Mobile's best preserved and elaborate examples of mid-19th century domestic architecture.

== History ==
The house was built in 1860 for Charles G. Richards, a steamboat captain, and his wife, Caroline Elizabeth Steele. It remained in their family until 1946, when it was purchased by the Ideal Cement Company. That company renovated it for office use in 1947. It was turned over to the city of Mobile in 1973, which then leased it to the Daughters of the American Revolution for operation as a museum.

== Architecture ==
The exterior of the two-story brick house is Italianate in style. The rectangular main block is offset at the rear with semi-octagonal bays. It features an elaborate cast iron veranda, with allegorical figures representing the four seasons, across the three bays of the main front elevation. The deck of the veranda is marble and granite. Bracketed cornices and paneled soffits at the roof line are topped by a shallow hipped roof.

The interior is divided on a side-hall plan. Notable ornamental features are a curved staircase, marble mantels, the original bronze chandeliers, and floor-length windows overlooking the veranda.
