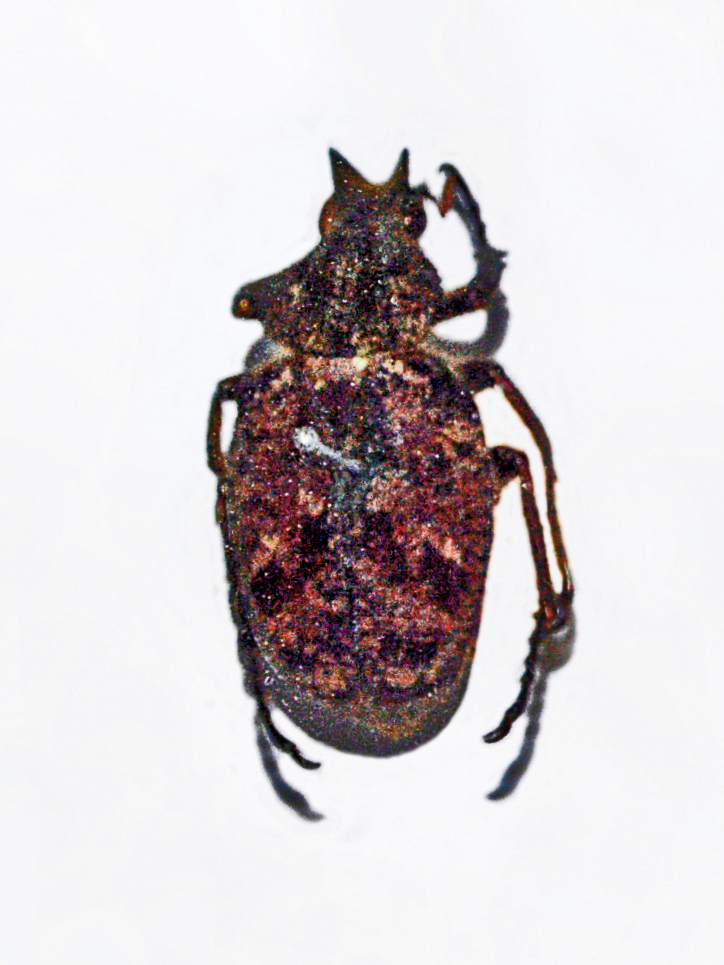
- Inca bonplandi. Mounted specimen.

Scientific classification
- Kingdom: Animalia
- Phylum: Arthropoda
- Clade: Pancrustacea
- Class: Insecta
- Order: Coleoptera
- Suborder: Polyphaga
- Infraorder: Scarabaeiformia
- Family: Scarabaeidae
- Genus: Inca
- Species: I. bonplandi

Binomial name
- Inca bonplandi (Gyllenhal, 1817)

Synonyms
- Goliathus fasciatus Kirby, 1819; Goliathus inscriptus Kirby, 1819; Goliathus tricuspis Drapiez, 1820; Inca serricollis LePeletier & Serville, 1828; Inca tapayo Gory & Percheron, 1833; Inca tapujo Perty, 1830; Ynca servicollis Laporte, 1840; Ynca tapago Laporte, 1840; Inca bomplandi Bruch, 1911

= Inca bonplandi =

Species of beetle

Inca bonplandi is a species of beetles of the family Scarabaeidae.

== Description ==
Inca bonplandi can reach a length of about 27–31 millimetres (1.1–1.2 in).

== Distribution ==
This species can be found in Brazil (Espírito Santo, Goiás, Minas Gerais, Paraná, Rio de Janeiro, Santa Catarina, Rio Grande do Sul, São Paulo), Argentina, Bolivia, and Paraguay.
