= USS LST-826 =

US LST-542 class tank landing ship

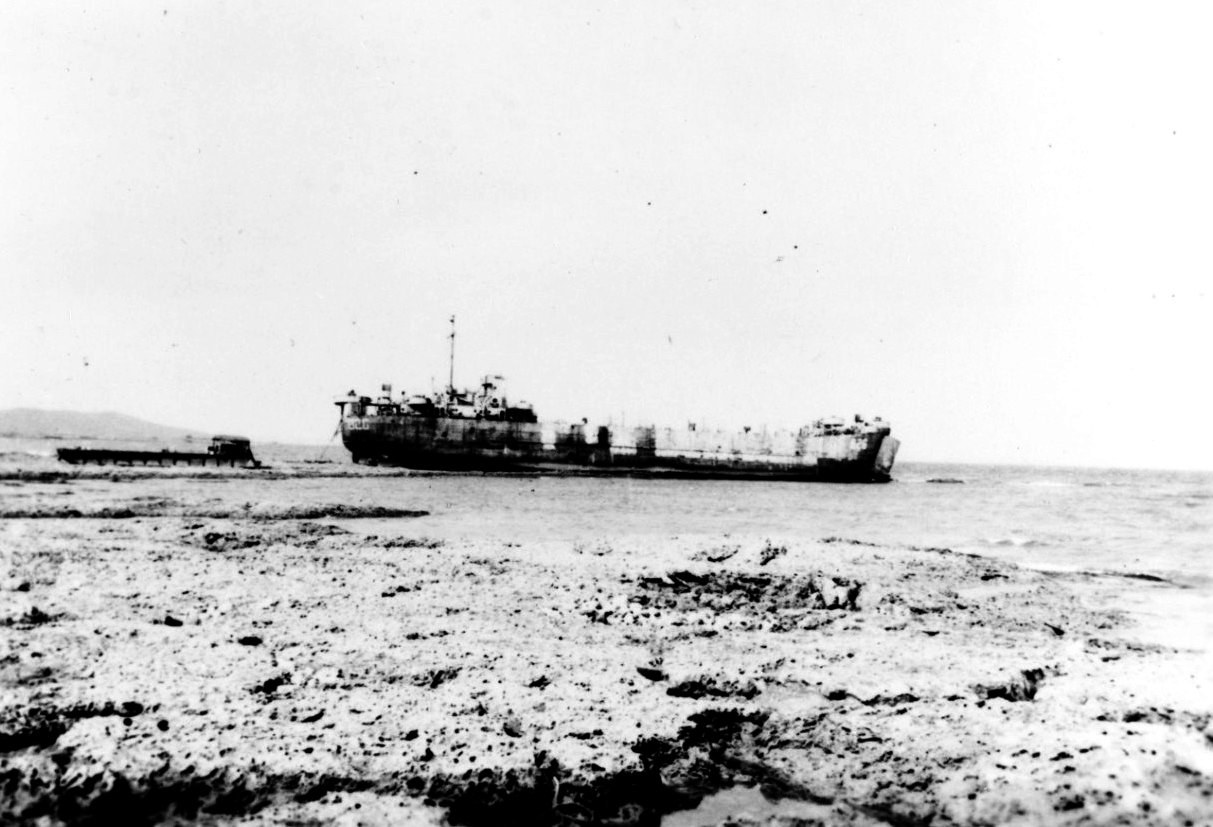
- LST-826 beached in Buckner Bay, Okinawa, after Typhoon Louise in October 1945

History

United States
- Name: USS LST-826
- Builder: Missouri Valley Bridge & Iron Co., Evansville, Indiana
- Laid down: 6 October 1944
- Launched: 14 November 1944
- Commissioned: 7 December 1944
- Honours and awards: 1 battle star (World War II)
- Fate: Wrecked, 9 October 1945; Sold for scrapping, 7 May 1947

General characteristics
- Class & type: LST-542-class tank landing ship
- Displacement: 1,490 long tons (1,514 t) light; 4,080 long tons (4,145 t) full
- Length: 328 ft (100 m)
- Beam: 50 ft (15 m)
- Draft: 8 ft (2.4 m) forward; 14 ft 4 in (4.37 m) aft
- Propulsion: 2 × General Motors 12-567 diesel engines, two shafts
- Speed: 10.8 knots (20.0 km/h; 12.4 mph)
- Complement: 7 officers, 104 enlisted men
- Armament: 6 × 40 mm guns; 6 × 20 mm guns

USS LST-826 was an LST-542-class tank landing ship in the United States Navy. Like many of her class, she was not named and is properly referred to by her hull designation.

LST-826 was laid down on 6 October 1944 at Evansville, Indiana, by the Missouri Valley Bridge & Iron Co.; launched on 14 November 1944; sponsored by Mrs. W. E. Haynie; and commissioned on 7 December 1944.

== Service history ==
During World War II, LST-826 was assigned to the Asiatic-Pacific theater and participated in the assault and occupation of Okinawa Gunto in May and June 1945. Following the war, she performed occupation duty in the Far East until early October 1945.

LST-826 was one of several ships grounded at Okinawa as a result of Typhoon Louise on 9 October 1945. She was declared beyond economical repair and was decommissioned on 3 December 1945. She was struck from the Navy List on 3 January 1946. In November 1945 the U.S. Chief of Naval Operations directed that the hulk be sunk or destroyed, but this was not done and she became one of around 15 wrecks that were finally sold in two batches in May and November 1947 by the State Department's Foreign Liquidations Commission. LST-826 and LST-823, along with Nestor (ARB-6), three floating docks and some smaller craft, were included in the May batch, and were sold to the Oklahoma-Philippines Co. for scrapping.

LST-826 earned one battle star for World War II service.
