= USS Valve =

WWII US ship

History

United States
- Laid down: 17 November 1942
- Launched: 20 May 1943
- Commissioned: 24 February 1944
- Decommissioned: 26 August 1946
- Stricken: 12 March 1948
- Fate: Sold, 26 July 1948

General characteristics
- Displacement: 1,630 tons
- Length: 213 ft 6 in (65.07 m)
- Beam: 39 ft (12 m)
- Draught: 14 ft 4 in (4.37 m)
- Propulsion: diesel-electric, twin screws, 2,780hp
- Speed: 15 knots
- Complement: 120
- Armament: four 40 mm guns, four 0.5 in (12.7 mm) machine guns

USS Valve (ARS-28) was a Diver-class rescue and salvage ship commissioned by the U.S. Navy during World War II. Her task was to come to the aid of stricken vessels.

Valve was laid down on 17 November 1942 at Bellingham, Washington, by the Bellingham Marine Railway Co.: launched on 20 May 1943, sponsored by Mrs Henry Foss. and commissioned on 24 February 1944.

== World War II service ==
Following shakedown, the salvage ship departed the U.S. West Coast at San Francisco, California, on 18 April 1944 bound for Hawaii with a trio of sled targets in tow, and arrived at Pearl Harbor 12 days later. She remained at the Pacific Fleet's base, operating locally, into the fall. Early in this tour, she assisted in fighting operations on burning LST's in West Loch, Pearl Harbor, in the wake of the destructive explosions which eventually sank five of these ships on 21 and 22 May. She spent four hours fighting the blazes before she was ordered to clear the area due to the danger of exploding ammunition carried in the LST's. On 23 May, she returned to West Loch and extinguished the blaze in the hulk of LST-480.

=== Salvage operations at Pearl ===
Valve commenced salvage operations on the sunken LST-515 on 31 May, her divers making 225 dives in 41 days. She worked on the wreck, removing such items as 15 tons of live ammunition. 10 LVT's, and a great deal of wreckage, from 31 May to 30 August. At noon on the latter day, she got underway to aid LCI(G)-366 aground off Wahie Point, Lanai. After pulling the landing craft free, she resumed salvage operations on LST-585 on 5 September. Valve prepared the ship's hulk for blasting by 8 October and with this task completed, sailed for Eniwetok 10 days later. (Note: DANFS appears to be in error on which LSTs Valve salvaged at West Loch, there is no evidence that either 515 or 585 were involved at West Loch.)

=== Guam operations ===
Valve served as flagship for the commander of a Guam-bound convoy containing Bond (AM-152) and SC-1036 and three merchantmen from 10 to 14 November, before the ship conducted salvage and clearance operations in Tanapag Harbor. Guam into December 1944. During this period, she salvaged Spark (IX-196) and prepared the hulk of Japanese freighter Keigo Maru for sinking at sea.

=== Saipan operations ===
After shifting to Saipan soon thereafter to relieve Anchor (ARS-13), Valve operated out of Saipan on local salvage operations and harbor clearance duties through the end of the year and into the spring of 1945. She departed Saipan for Iwo Jima on 28 May 1945, towing the hulk of Japanese merchantman Togoto Maru.

=== Okinawa operations ===
Next serving on local convoy escort duties between Iwo Jima and Guam, Valve shifted to Okinawan waters in July. Between 18 and 31 July, the salvage vessel went to general quarters during 15 "flash-red" alerts while in Okinawan waters.

=== Operations in Pacific typhoons ===
She conducted salvage operations in inner Naha harbor at Okinawa into the winter of 1945. When Colbert (APA-145) struck a drifting mine while on typhoon evasion on 17 September, Valve towed the stricken ship to a safe anchorage in Okinawa. Valve rode out another severe typhoon which swirled its way into the fleet anchorage on 9 October. During the storm SS Richard S. Oglesby twice fouled Valve, and LST-826 collided with the salvage ship as well. Fortunately, Valve suffered only minor damage.

Valve subsequently conducted salvage operations on other typhoon damaged ships including Wateree (ATF-117), Sacandaga (AOG-40), LST-828, LST-581 and Vandalia (IX-191) through December 1945. The salvage vessel then conducted local salvage and harbor clearance operations at Okinawa into the spring of 1946.

== Supporting nuclear testing at Bikini Atoll ==
In May, she assisted in the preparations at Bikini Atoll for Operation Crossroads before sailing via Pearl Harbor for the west coast.

== Decommissioning ==
Decommissioned on 26 August 1946, Valve was struck from the Navy list on 12 March 1948 and sold to Walter H. Wilms on 26 July 1948.

== Military awards and honors ==
Valve earned one battle star for World War II service. Her crew was eligible for the following medals:

- American Campaign Medal
- Asiatic-Pacific Campaign Medal (1)
- World War II Victory Medal
- Navy Occupation Service Medal (with Asia clasp)
