= Ross Knox House =

Historic house in Alabama, United States

- U.S. National Register of Historic Places
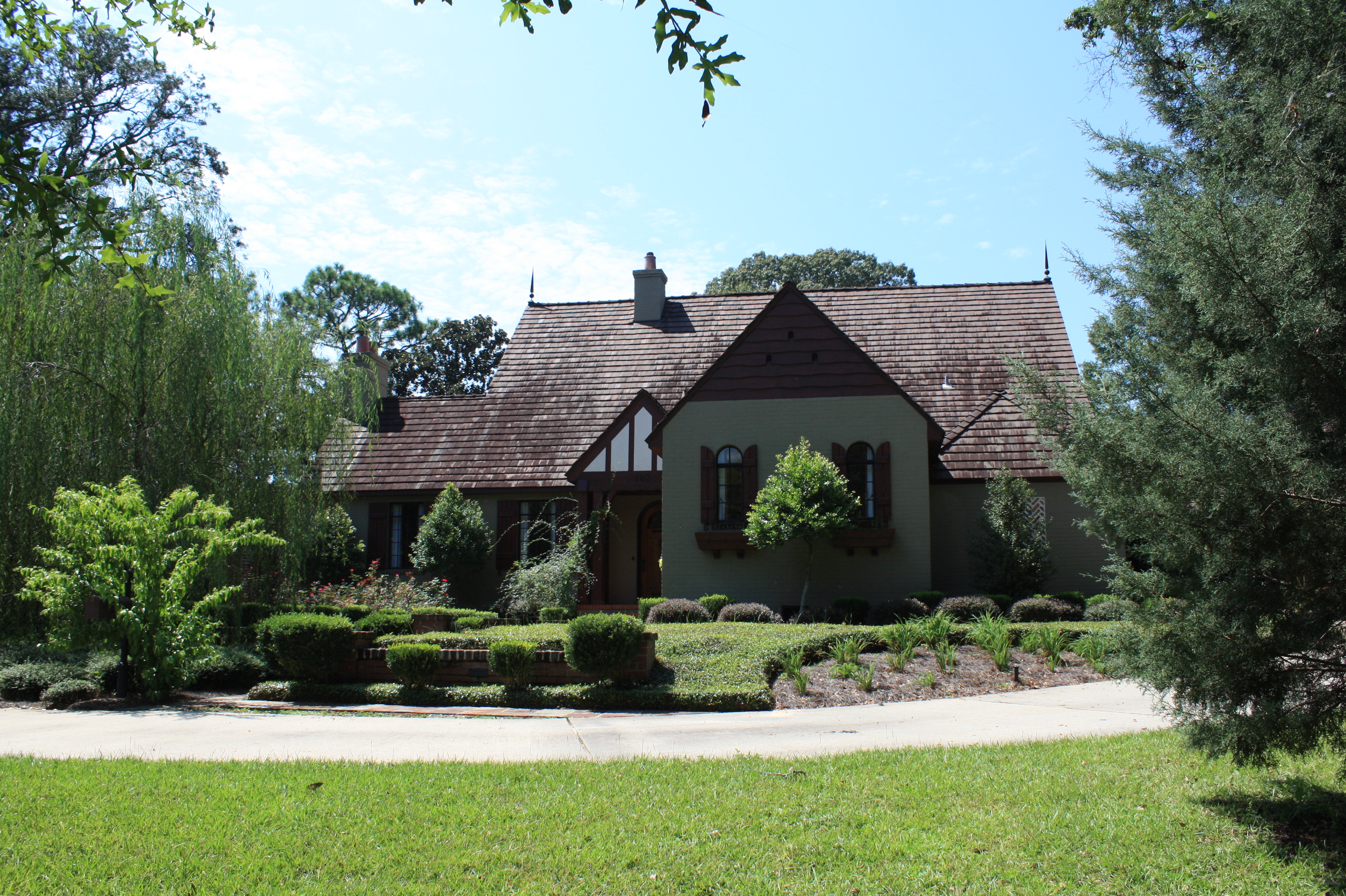

- Location within Mobile, Alabama Location within Alabama Location within the United States
- Location: 102 Hillwood Road; Mobile, Alabama
- Coordinates: 30°41′17″N 88°9′0″W
- Area: less than one acre
- Built: 1929
- Architect: Roberts, John Platt
- Architectural style: Tudor Revival
- NRHP reference No.: 08001252
- Added to NRHP: December 30, 2008

The Ross Knox House is a historic Tudor Revival style residence in Mobile, Alabama, United States. The two-story brick and stucco house was completed in 1929. It is considered one of the best Tudor Revival houses in Mobile by the Alabama Historical Commission. Built in the 1920s upper-class suburb of County Club Estates, it was designed by architect John Platt Roberts.

== Architecture ==
The front elevation gives the appearance of a one-story Tudor cottage, with the rear revealing a full second story. The exterior architecture features steeply pitched gables, half-timbering with stucco infill, prominent chimneys, and casement windows.

== History ==
The house was bought in 1933 by Ross Knox, the president of the Lucas E. Moore Stave Company of Georgia, a cooperage and supply company. He sold it in 1942. In 1959 it was bought by a local judge, Herndon Inge Jr. It served as Inge's residence for over 40 years. His experiences as a German POW during World War II were featured in the Ken Burns' PBS documentary, The War. Following Inge's ownership, the house was purchased by the John A. Roberts Jr. family in 2002. It was added to the National Register of Historic Places on December 30, 2008.
