= USS Ocelot =

Cargo ship of the United States Navy

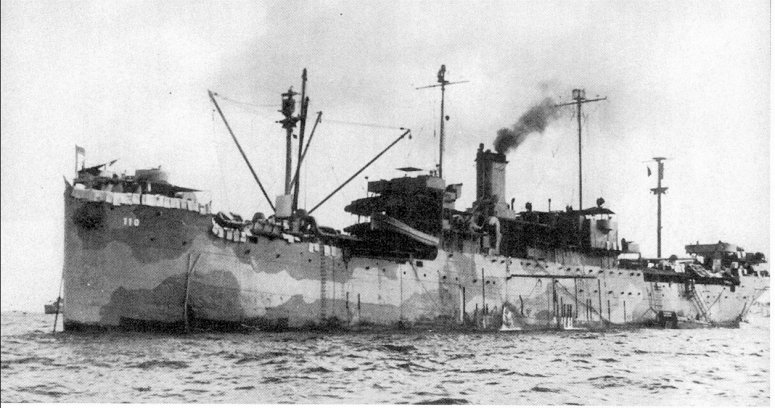
- USS Ocelot (IX-110) at Ulithi while serving as Service Squadron Ten flagship, 6 May 1945.

History

United States
- Name: USS Ocelot
- Namesake: Ocelot
- Builder: Oscar Daniels Shipbuilding Co., Tampa, Florida
- Laid down: 5 April 1918
- Launched: 22 February 1919, as Yomachichi
- Acquired: 2 October 1943
- Commissioned: 15 January 1944, as Ocelot
- Decommissioned: 6 December 1945
- Stricken: 3 January 1946
- Nickname(s): Spotted Cat
- Fate: Sold for scrapping, 19 February 1948

General characteristics (in USN service)
- Type: Design 1027 ship
- Displacement: 5,868 long tons (5,962 t) (light); 8,747 long tons (8,887 t) (full)
- Length: 416 ft (127 m)
- Beam: 54 ft (16 m)
- Draft: 18 ft 9 in (5.72 m)
- Propulsion: Busch-Sulzer 6-cylinder 3,000 shp (2,200 kW) diesel engine; Single screw
- Speed: 13 knots (24 km/h; 15 mph)
- Capacity: Accommodation for 819 men (81 officers, 738 enlisted)
- Complement: 82
- Armament: 1 × 3"/50 caliber dual purpose gun; 1 × single 40 mm AA gun; 8 × single 20 mm AA guns

USS Ocelot (IX–110) was an unclassified miscellaneous vessel of the United States Navy, which served as the flagship of Service Squadron 10 in the Pacific War from late 1944, until she was wrecked in a typhoon in late 1945.

== Service history ==
=== As cargo ship ===
The steel-hulled vessel was built in 1918–19 as the Yomachichi by the Oscar Daniels Shipbuilding Company of Tampa, Florida for the United States Shipping Board. Originally fitted with vertical triple expansion steam engines, she was re-equipped with diesel engines in 1926–27. On 11 March 1940 the ship was chartered to the United States Lines by the War Shipping Administration (WSA) at Baltimore, Maryland.

=== In United States Navy ===
On 16 September 1943 CinCPac requested a barracks ship to accommodate 50 officers and 800 men for use at an advanced base, and the WSA nominated the motor ship Yomachichi, then under repair at Baltimore, as suitable for the purpose. The ship was accepted by the Navy under a bareboat charter from the WSA on 2 October 1943. Commissioned as Ocelot on 15 January 1944, The conversion work was completed on 22 January 1944, but problems with the main engine meant that she did not report for shakedown until early May.

Ocelot transited the Panama Canal and, following a brief stop in San Diego, arrived at Pearl Harbor to undergo conversion to flagship for Service Squadron 10. The ship was fitted with extensive radio and visual signaling equipment, with radio and coding rooms in the superstructure, and berths for the squadron commander, staff officers, and enlisted men below. The conversion was completed in October, and Ocelot sailed via Eniwetok for Ulithi where she spent the next six months providing an administrative post at the advanced base. The movement of American forces closer to Japan necessitated advancing support elements as well, and on 24 May 1945 Ocelot shifted to San Pedro Bay, Leyte On 13 September Ocelot again moved, to Buckner Bay, Okinawa. Shortly after her arrival there, on 19 September 1945 Typhoon Ida struck.

==== Loss and disposal ====
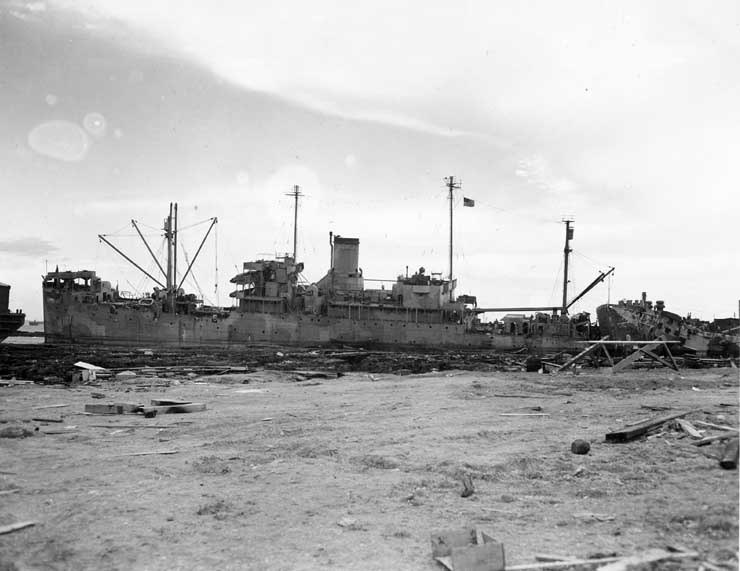
USS Ocelot (IX-110) aground in Buckner Bay, Okinawa, November 1945. Her stern was cut off when USS Nestor (ARB-6), visible to the right, crashed into her during the storm.

Ocelot was involved in a series of collisions with other vessels; the barge YF-1079, the stores ship Zaniah (AG-70), the landing ship medium LSM-39, and the Victory ship SS Pratt Victory, before she attempted to move into the safer waters of the open sea. However she grounded on a reef, where she was then struck by the merchant ship SS Victor H. Oulanhan. Rapidly taking on water, the crew formed a bucket line, and bailed continuously for six hours. After attempts by tugs to refloat her failed, the ship was abandoned. She was eventually refloated, but on 9 October during Typhoon Louise she was struck by the repair ship Nestor (ARB-6), which severed her stern section. Stripped of salvageable items, she was abandoned on 29 October, decommissioned on 6 December, and was struck from the Navy List on 3 January 1946.

Ocelot was returned to the custody of the WSA on 5 April 1946 and her hulk was sold by the Maritime Commission, along with seven other wrecks and five civilian liberty ships, to China Merchants and Engineers, Inc. for scrapping on 19 February 1948.
