= USS LST-823 =

1944 LST-542-class tank landing ship

History

United States
- Name: USS LST-823
- Builder: Missouri Valley Bridge & Iron Co., Evansville, Indiana
- Laid down: 25 September 1944
- Launched: 4 November 1944
- Commissioned: 28 December 1944
- Decommissioned: 1 December 1945
- Stricken: 3 January 1946
- Honours and awards: 1 battle star (World War II)
- Fate: Sold, May 1947

General characteristics
- Class & type: LST-542-class tank landing ship
- Displacement: 1,490 long tons (1,514 t) light; 4,080 long tons (4,145 t) full
- Length: 328 ft (100 m)
- Beam: 50 ft (15 m)
- Draft: 8 ft (2.4 m) forward; 14 ft 4 in (4.37 m) aft
- Propulsion: 2 × General Motors 12-567 diesel engines, two shafts
- Speed: 10.8 knots (20.0 km/h; 12.4 mph)
- Complement: 7 officers, 104 enlisted men
- Armament: 6 × 40 mm guns; 6 × 20 mm guns

USS LST-823 was an LST-542-class tank landing ship in the United States Navy. Like many of her class, she was not named and is properly referred to by her hull designation.

LST-823 was laid down on 25 September 1944 at Evansville, Indiana, by the Missouri Valley Bridge & Iron Co.; launched on 4 November 1944; sponsored by Miss Olinda M. Brune; and commissioned on 28 November 1944.

== Service history ==
LST-823 was assigned to the Asiatic-Pacific theater. She arrived at Pearl Harbor in February 1945 and delivered Seabees and cargo to Guam in March. At the end of May she and another LST, one towing a landing craft and the other a repair barge, sailed from Guam for Okinawa. On 4 June the small convoy rode out a typhoon that drove it some eighty miles off course. LST-823 entered Okinawa's Buckner Bay in early July, but went to sea in mid-July to evade a typhoon. She called at Saipan in early August, delivered ammunition to Iwo Jima in mid-August, and returned to Buckner Bay in early September.

=== Typhoon ===
Caught off guard inside Buckner Bay by a typhoon on 16 September 1945, LST-823 was driven onto the Kutaka Shima reef there. She was pulled off a week later by the salvage ship Valve (ARS-28), but both engines were inoperative and the starboard engine and shaft were badly out of alignment. While awaiting drydocking at Buckner Bay she was caught by another typhoon on 9 October which tore her loose from her moorings, drove her into two other ships, and then deposited her on a reef parallel to and 75 yards (69 m) from the shore near the entrance to the Yonabaru Channel. Her entire bottom was badly damaged and holed and both main engines were badly misaligned. LST-823 patched up her leaks with cement and became a fueling and provisions ship for small craft. The ship was not refloated, and in early November an inspection and survey party noted that she would need two weeks in drydock before she could be towed to a rear area and recommended she be decommissioned in place. Her gear was stripped away and taken to Guam, and she was decommissioned at the beginning of December 1945 and stricken from the Navy List in early January 1946. In May 1947, the hulk was sold to the Oklahoma-Philippines Co.

LST-823 earned one battle star for World War II service.
