= USS Zaniah =

Cargo ship of the United States Navy

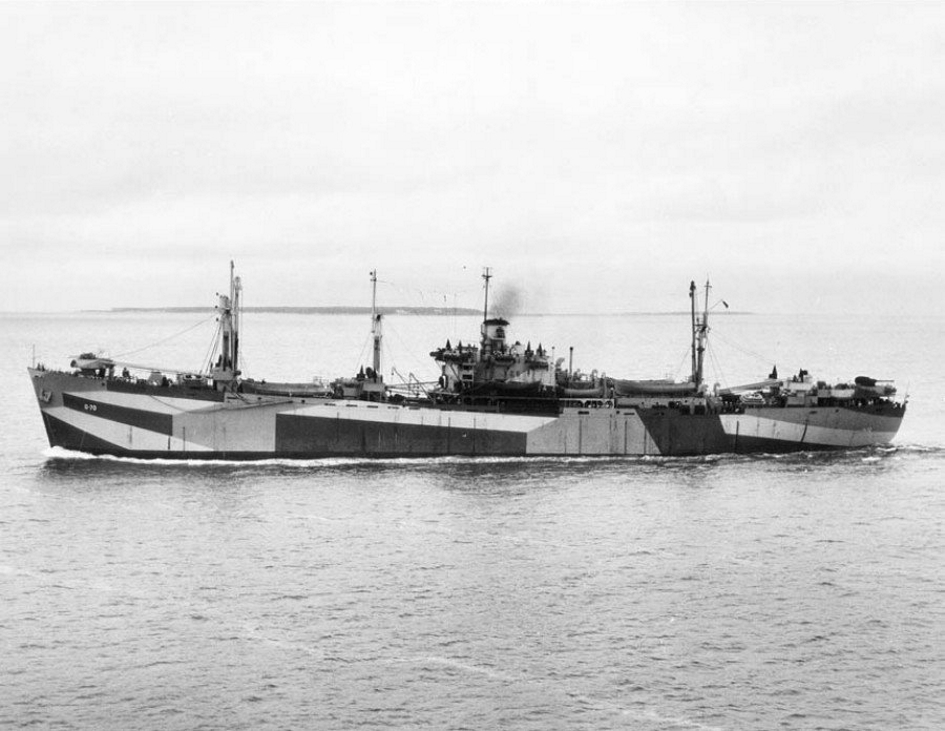

History

United States
- Name: Anthony F. Lucas; Zaniah
- Namesake: Anthony F. Lucas; The star system Zaniah
- Ordered: as Anthony F. Lucas; Z-EC2-S-C1 hull, MCE hull 2422
- Laid down: 29 October 1943
- Launched: 12 December 1943
- Acquired: 2 November 1943
- Commissioned: as Zaniah (AK-120), 22 December 1943
- Decommissioned: 28 December 1943
- In service: as Zaniah (AG-70), 2 September 1944
- Out of service: 29 April 1946
- Stricken: 22 May 1947
- Fate: Sold for scrapping, 1972

General characteristics
- Displacement: 5,371 tons light; 14,350 tons full load
- Length: 441 ft 6 in (134.57 m)
- Beam: 56 ft (17 m)
- Draught: 23 ft (7.0 m)
- Propulsion: triple expansion reciprocating engine, single shaft, 2,500hp
- Speed: 12.5 kts.
- Complement: 181
- Armament: 1 × 5 in (130 mm) dual-purpose gun mount; 2 × 3 in (76 mm) dual-purpose gun mounts; 4 × 40 mm guns; 12 × 20 mm guns; 4 × 0.5 in (12.7 mm) mgs.

USS Zaniah (AK-120) was a Basilan-class cargo ship commissioned by the United States Navy for service in World War II. She was responsible for delivering troops, goods and equipment to locations in the war zone.

SS Anthony F. Lucas—a Liberty ship—was laid down under a Maritime Commission contract (MCE hull 2422) on 29 October 1943 at Houston, Texas, by the Todd-Houston Shipbuilding Corp.; acquired by the Navy under a bareboat charter on 2 November 1943; renamed Zaniah and classified as a cargo ship, AK-120, on 13 November; launched on 12 December; sponsored by Mrs. LeRoy Bembry; and accepted by the Navy and commissioned on 22 December 1943, for ferrying to the Alabama Drydock and Shipbuilding Company's yard at Mobile, Alabama, for conversion.

== Conversion to stores-barracks-distilling ship ==
Arriving at Mobile on the day after Christmas, Zaniah soon entered dockyard hands and was decommissioned on 28 December. Meanwhile, during the conversion, the Navy broadened Zaniah's mission to that of a special stores-barracks-distilling ship and redesignated her AG-70 on 14 March 1944. Before she was completed, a distilling plant capable of producing 80,000 gallons of fresh water was installed in the ship; and she was commissioned on 2 September 1944.

== World War II service ==
Zaniah departed Mobile on 17 September, bound—via Key West, Florida—for Hampton Roads. Arriving at Key West on the 20th, the auxiliary vessel joined a coastwise convoy—KN-339—passing up the eastern seaboard from the 21st to the 24th, before steaming independently for Hampton Roads. Zaniah conducted her shakedown training in the Chesapeake Bay before shifting to New York City.

=== Transfer to the Pacific Fleet ===
Getting underway again on 23 October, Zaniah sailed southward, transited the Panama Canal on 4 November, and arrived at Pearl Harbor on the 22d. Zaniah underwent further conversion at the Pearl Harbor Navy Yard—receiving additional office spaces and living quarters to accommodate the staff of a fleet service division. In addition, the ship's force joined yard workmen in installing a large electronics repair and supply department and additional water condensers to enable the ship to furnish fresh water to ships in forward areas of the South Pacific Ocean.

=== Repairing battle-damaged ships ===
Zaniah, thus outfitted for her special operations-departed Pearl Harbor on 10 January 1945 bound for Manus, in the Admiralties. Arriving on the 26th at Seeadler Harbor, she operated for a time with Sierra (AD-18) in repairing battle-damaged ships which put into Manus. Houston (CL-81) was among the warships which benefited from her services.

=== Supporting invasion forces at Philippine Islands ===
Zaniah soon shifted to the Solomons, providing water and repair services at Purvis Bay, Florida Island, from the day of her arrival, Washington's Birthday 1945. She returned to Manus on 19 March before sailing for Hollandia, New Guinea, to join a Philippine-bound convoy, GI-18, on the 29th. Zaniah arrived at San Pedro Bay, off Leyte, on 4 April and discharged her much-needed electronics and machinery parts before sailing for the Carolines.

=== Supporting repair efforts at Okinawa ===
The auxiliary ship operated at Ulithi from 13 to 24 April, providing repair services to ships damaged during the conquest of the Ryukyus. Zaniah, herself, sailed for Okinawa on the 24th and arrived on 1 May—one month after the first landings on the embattled island. The first ship of her type in the area, she arrived at a critical time, as her commanding officer wrote: "when damage was at its height and repair facilities and personnel were scarce."

=== Performing repair work under dangerous conditions ===
Zaniah's boats soon began a 24-hour schedule of transporting repairmen, in shifts, to damaged vessels. Initially, many men found themselves working 18-hour stints; and, despite daily air attacks and alerts, repair work progressed well. Salvage units from Zaniah cleared debris and made damaged hulls seaworthy until more permanent repairs could be made; others restored electrical plants and propulsion machinery; still others performed repairs on the vital and delicate radars and electronics installations on ships. Zaniah bore a charmed life—she was never attacked by Japanese planes during her sojourn off Okinawa. On 22 June, two ships were struck nearby LST-534 and Ellyson (DMS-10) -- the closest that the vital auxiliary came to being attacked.

=== Rough weather ===
Zaniah shifted to Buckner Bay on 10 July and performed her services as a repair and water-distilling ship through the end of the war with Japan in mid-August. She suffered some damage in a typhoon which struck the Fleet's anchorage on 16 September, when Ocelot (IX-110) dragged her anchor in the tempest and brushed heavily against Zaniah, smashing a motor whaleboat and demolishing some bulwarks and stanchions on board the repair vessel.

=== End-of-war activity ===
That autumn, Zaniah later operated out of Tokyo Bay until sailing on 1 December for the United States. Arriving at Seattle, Washington, on Christmas Day, 1945, Zaniah shifted to Hawaii, arriving at Pearl Harbor on 11 March 1946. Records are unclear at this point but suggest that the ship may have participated in explosive tests in the 14th Naval District.

== Post-war decommissioning ==
Decommissioned at Pearl Harbor on 29 April 1946, Zaniah was towed to the west coast; reached Suisun Bay, California, on 14 May 1947; and was turned over to the Maritime Commission the following day. She was struck from the Navy list on 22 May 1947 and was laid up in the National Defense Reserve Fleet through the 1960s. In November 1972, Zaniah was towed to Seattle-Tacoma, Washington, and broken up for scrap.

== Military awards and honors ==
Zaniah received one battle star for her World War II service. Her crew was eligible for the following medals:

- American Campaign Medal
- Asiatic-Pacific Campaign Medal (1)
- World War II Victory Medal
- Navy Occupation Medal (with Asia Clasp)
