= Azalea Court Apartments =

- U.S. National Register of Historic Places
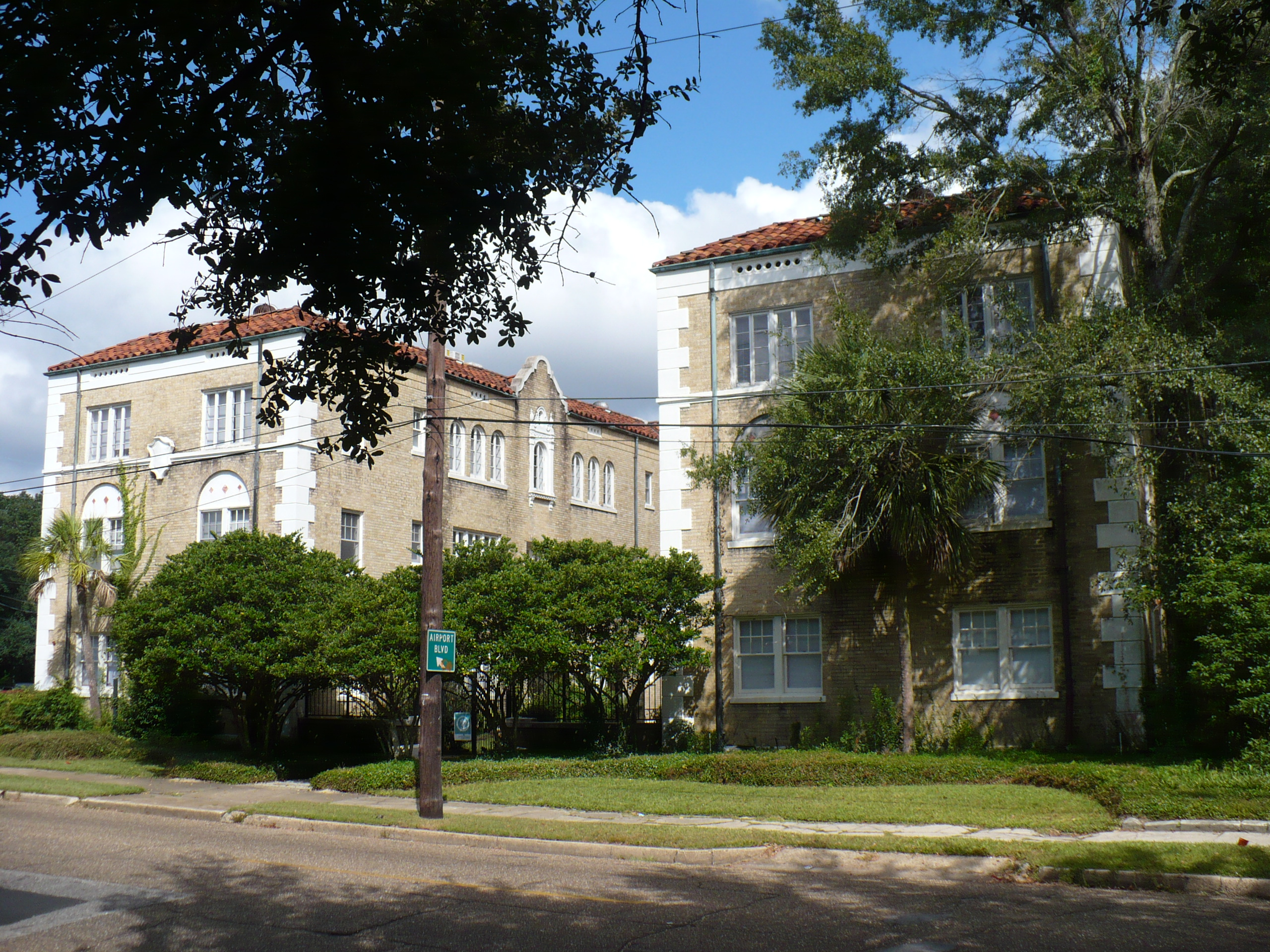
- Front elevation of Azalea Court

- Location within Mobile, Alabama Location within Alabama Location within the United States
- Location: Mobile, Alabama
- Coordinates: 30°40′41″N 88°4′59″W
- Built: 1928
- Architect: J. Platt Roberts
- Architectural style: Mission/Spanish Revival
- NRHP reference No.: 88000108
- Added to NRHP: February 11, 1988

The Azalea Court Apartments is a historic three-story apartment building located in Mobile, Alabama. It was built in 1928 and was designed by architect J. Platt Roberts in the Spanish Colonial Revival style. It was added to the National Register of Historic Places on February 11, 1988.
