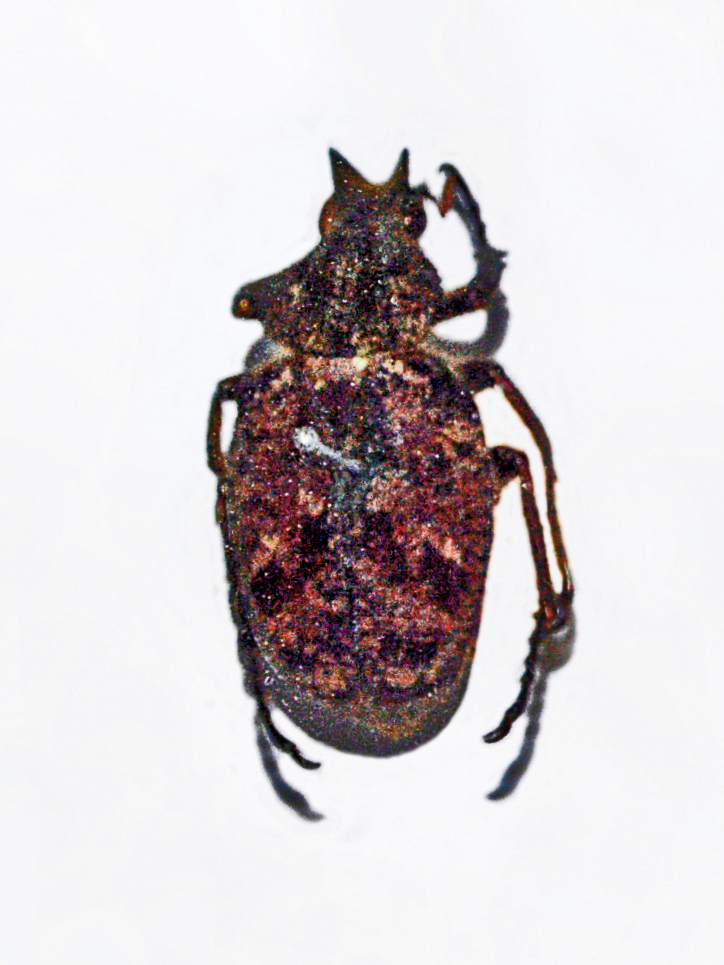
- Inca bonplandi

Scientific classification
- Kingdom: Animalia
- Phylum: Arthropoda
- Clade: Pancrustacea
- Class: Insecta
- Order: Coleoptera
- Suborder: Polyphaga
- Infraorder: Scarabaeiformia
- Family: Scarabaeidae
- Subfamily: Cetoniinae
- Tribe: Trichiini
- Subtribe: Incaina
- Genus: Inca; Lepeletier & Serville, 1828

Synonyms
- Ynca Chevrolat, 1833 (misspelling)

= Inca (beetle) =

Genus of beetles

Inca is a genus of beetles belonging to the family Scarabaeidae.

== Species ==
- Inca axeli Sousa & Seidel, 2021
- Inca besckii Burmeister & Schaum, 1840
- Inca bonplandi (Gyllenhal, 1817)
- Inca clathratus (Olivier, 1792)
- Inca irroratus (Chevrolat, 1833)
- Inca neglectus Sousa & Seidel, 2021
- Inca pulverulentus (Olivier, 1789)

== Former species ==
- Inca burmeisteri Burmeister, 1847
