= De Tonti Square Historic District =

Historic district in Alabama, United States

- U.S. National Register of Historic Places
- U.S. Historic district
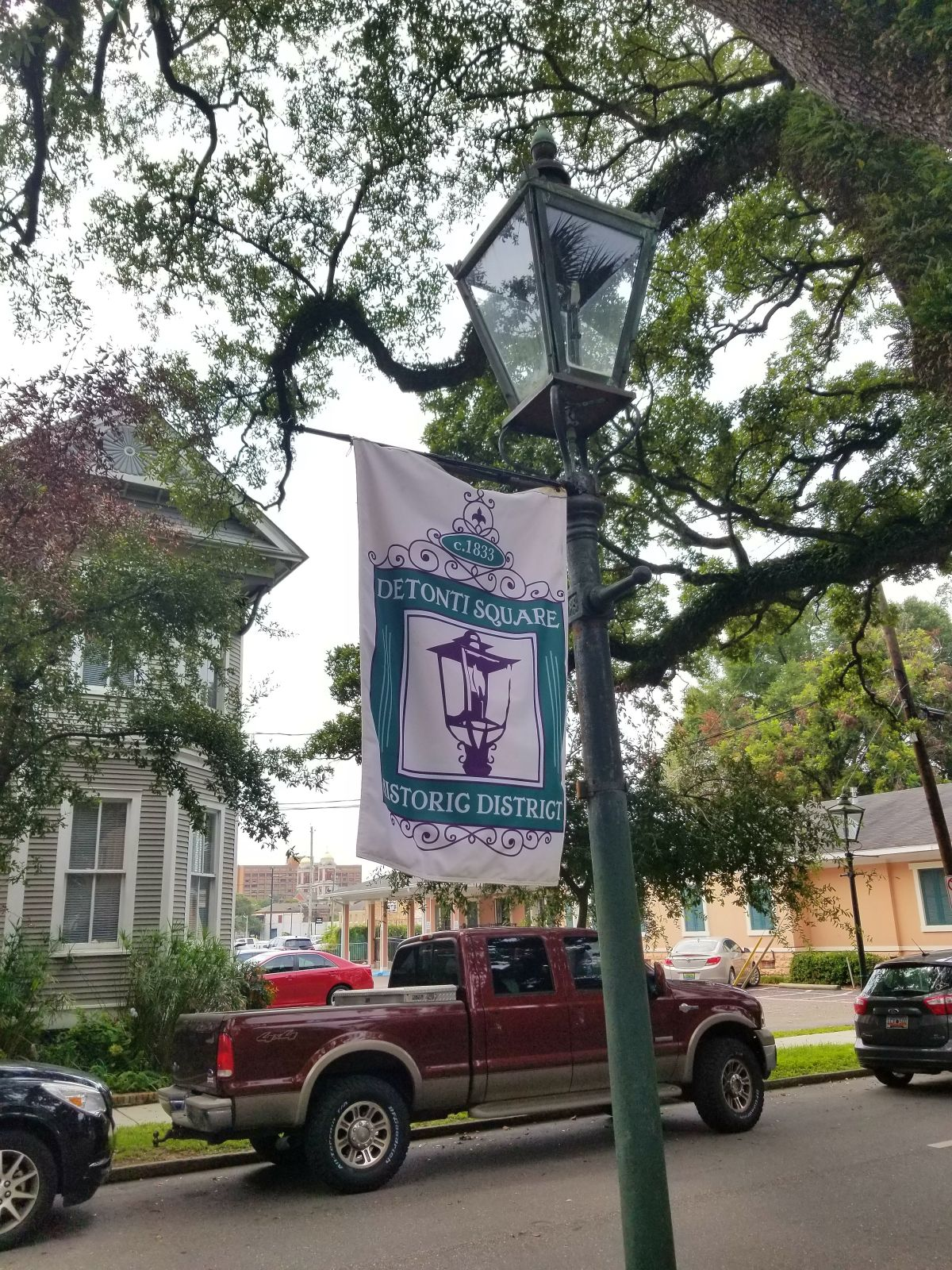

- Location within Mobile, Alabama Location within Alabama Location within the United States
- Location: Roughly bounded by Adams, St. Anthony, Claiborne, and Conception Sts., Mobile, Alabama
- Coordinates: 30°41′44″N 88°2′48″W
- Area: 28 acres (11 ha)
- Architectural style: Classical Revival, Late Victorian, Federal
- NRHP reference No.: 72000169
- Added to NRHP: February 7, 1972

The De Tonti Square Historic District is a historic district in the city of Mobile, Alabama, United States. It was placed on the National Register of Historic Places on February 7, 1972. It is a nine-block area, roughly bounded by Adams, St. Anthony, Claiborne, and Conception Streets. The district covers 28 acres (0.11 km^{2}) and contains 66 contributing buildings. It was named in honor of Henri de Tonti and consists mainly of townhouses built between 1840 and 1860. It includes numerous examples of the Federal, Greek Revival, and Italianate architectural styles.

== Gallery ==
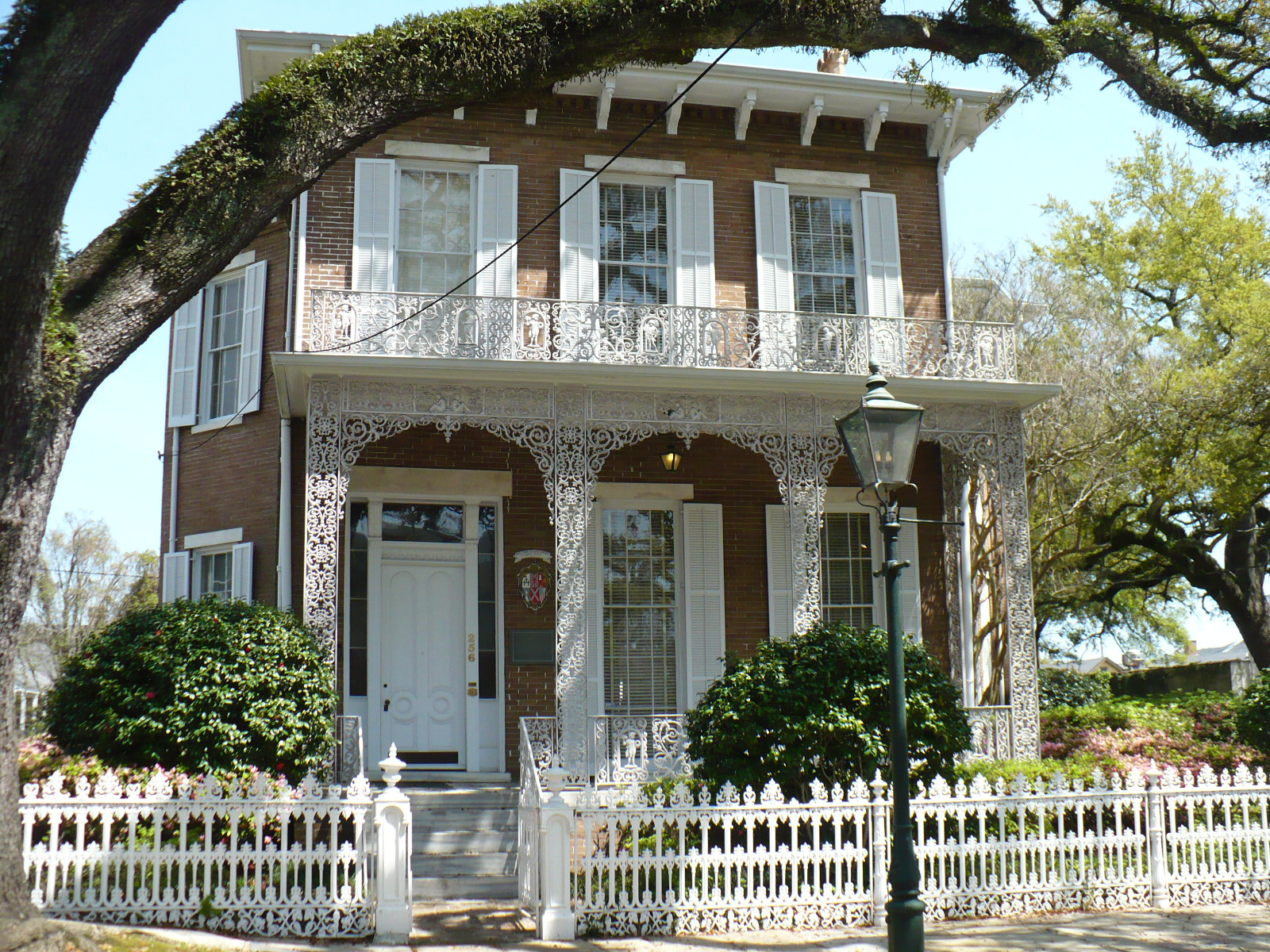
The Richards DAR House at 256 Joachim Street

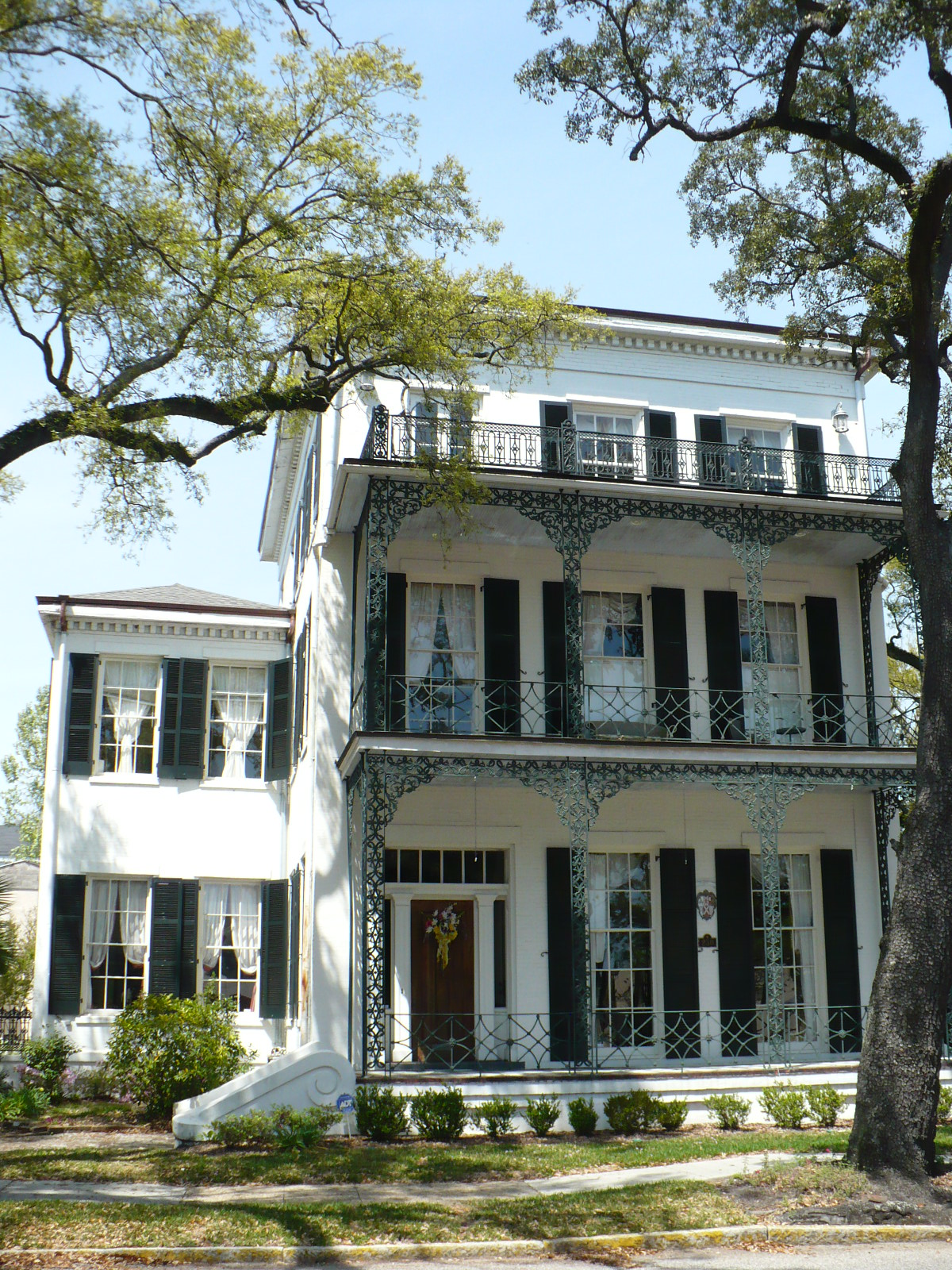
Williams-Rogers House at 250 St. Anthony Street

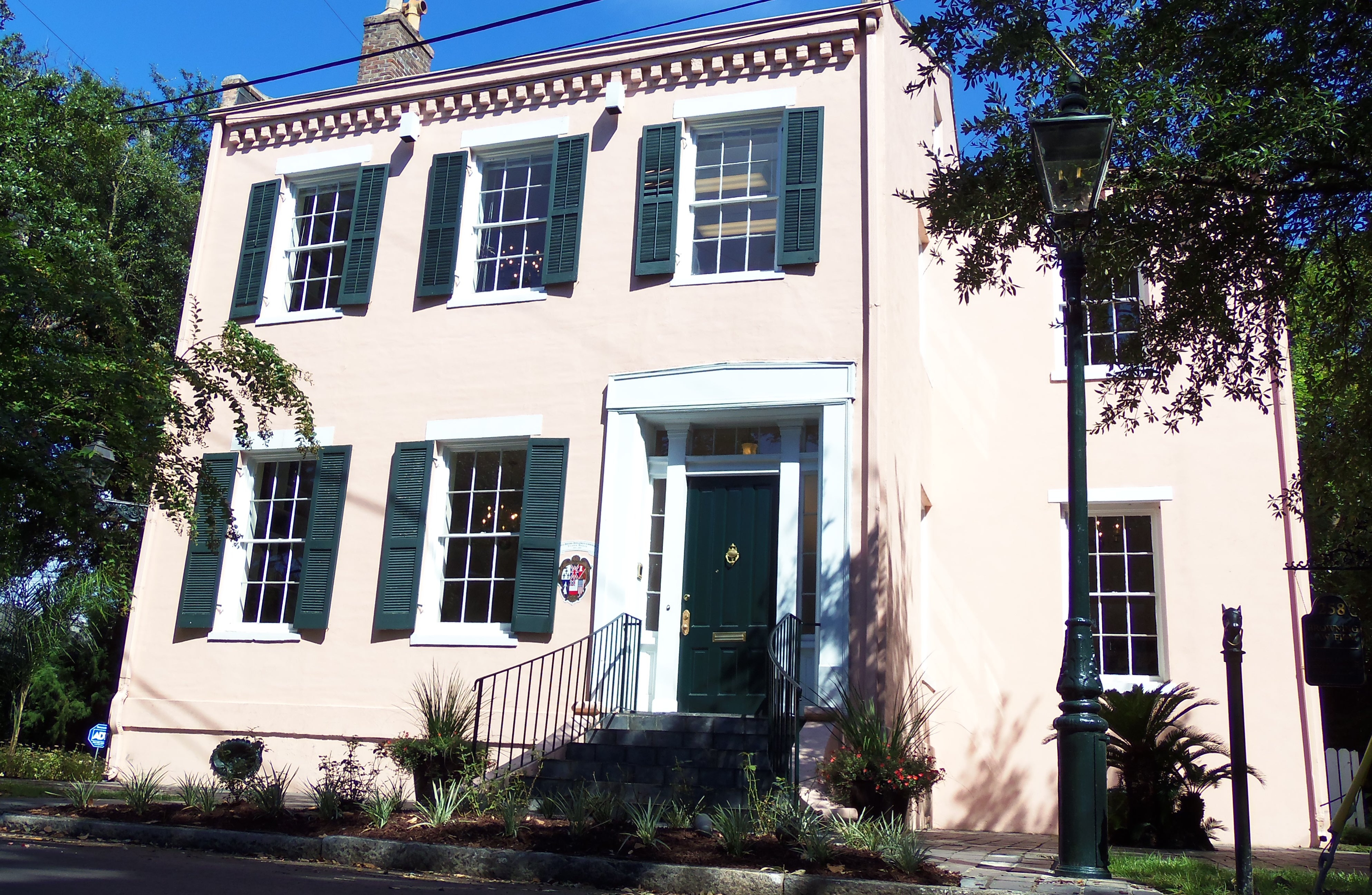
258 State Street

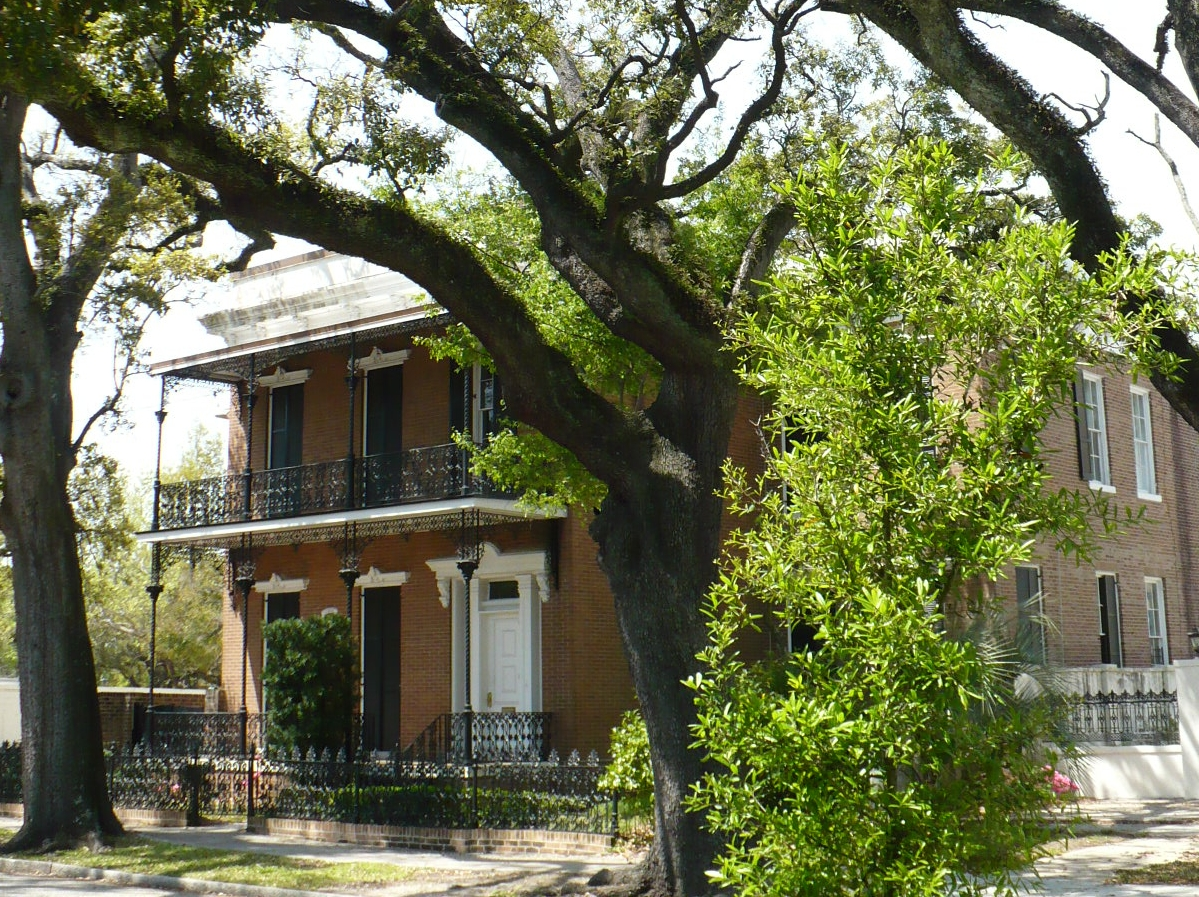
254 St. Anthony Street

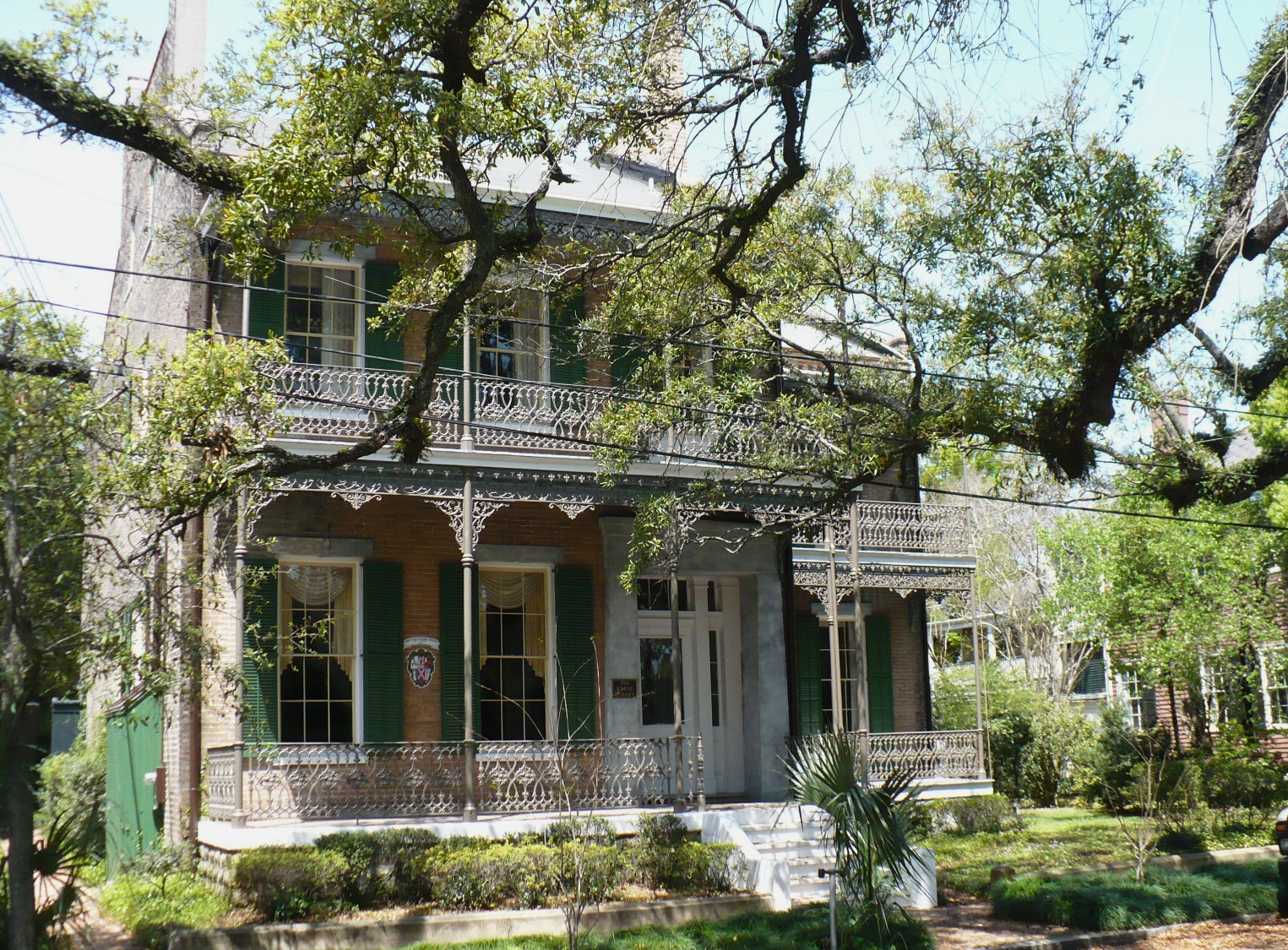
256 State Street

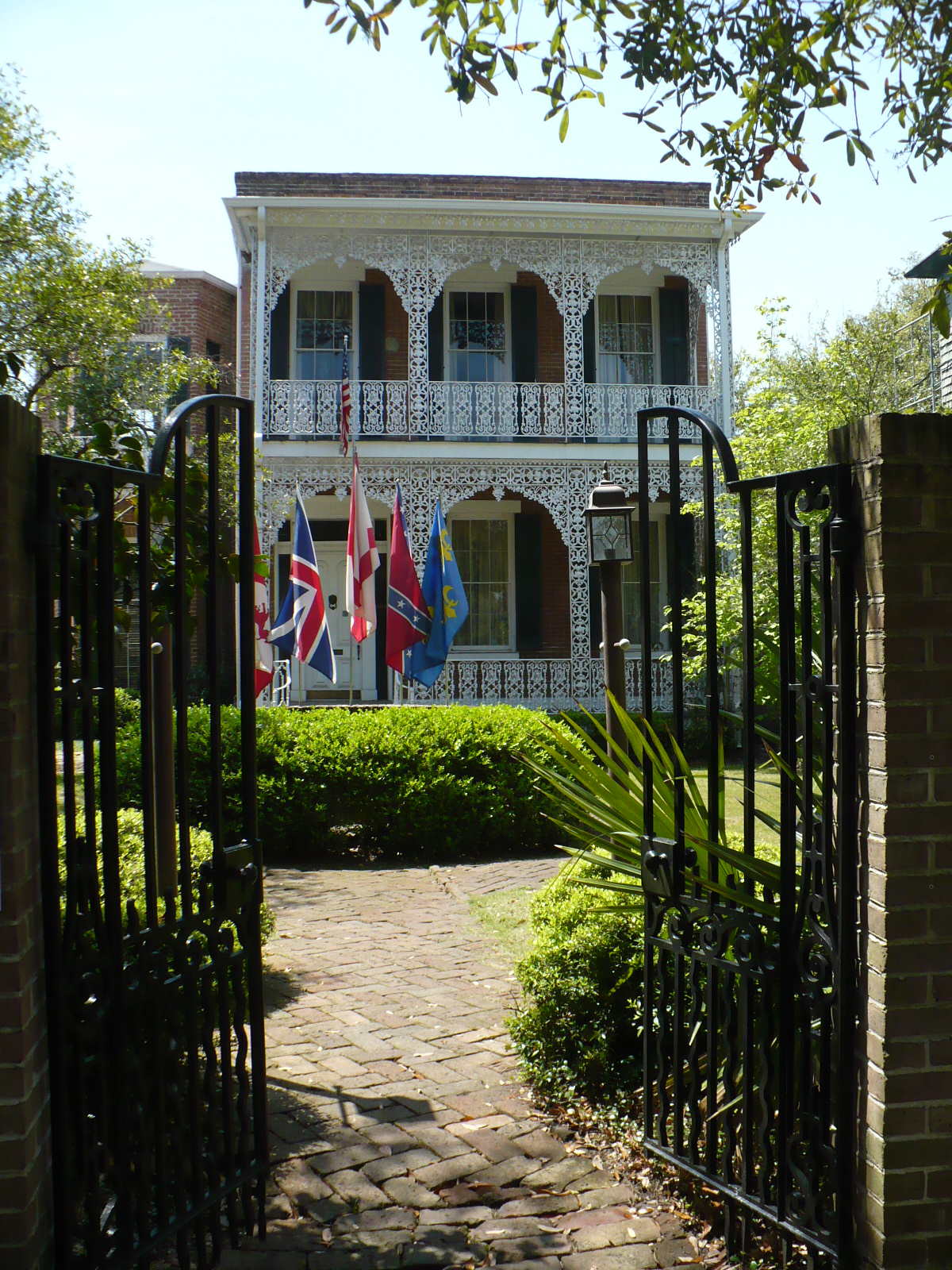
261 Joachim Street

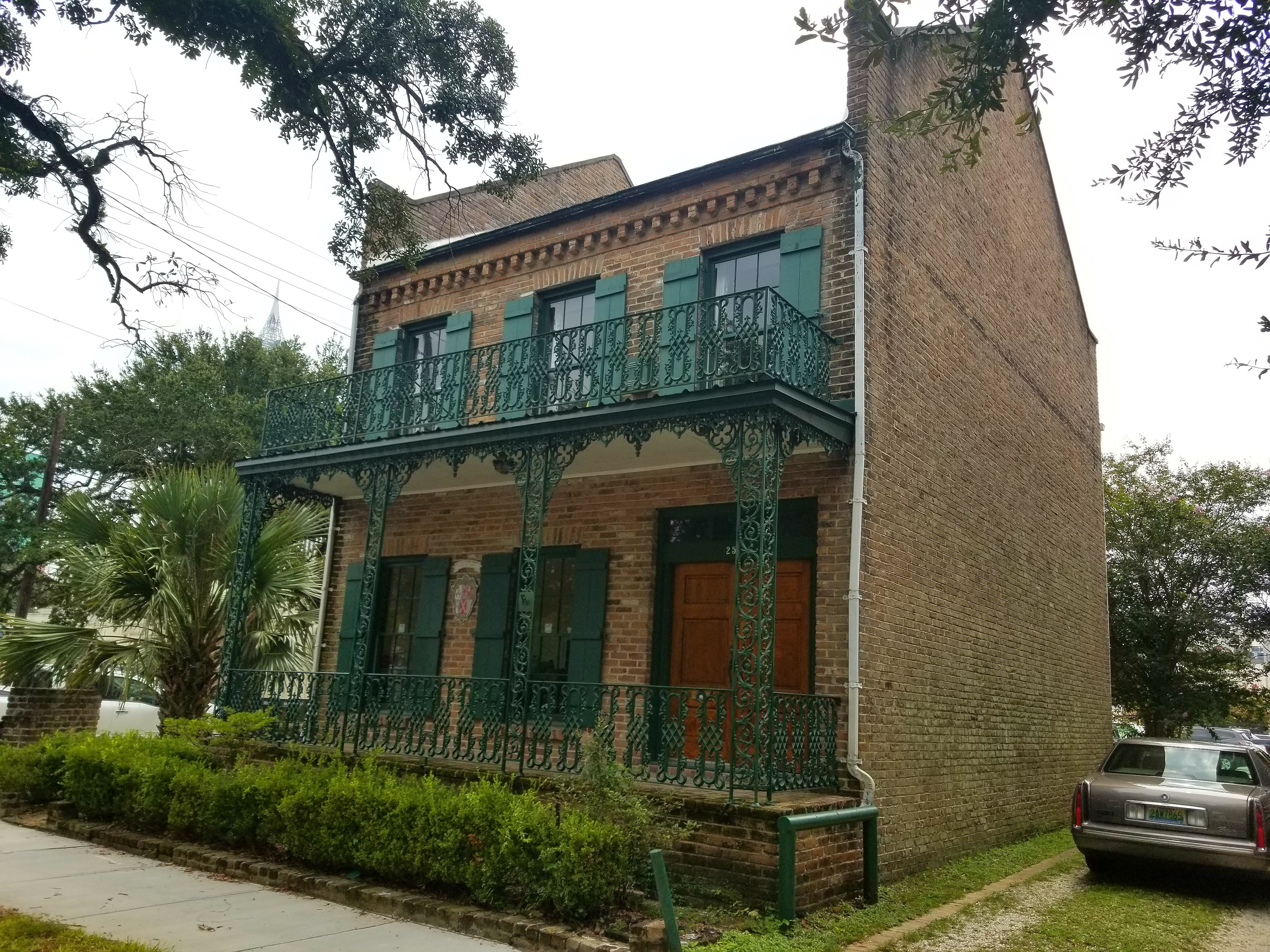
251 St. Anthony Street - September 2017

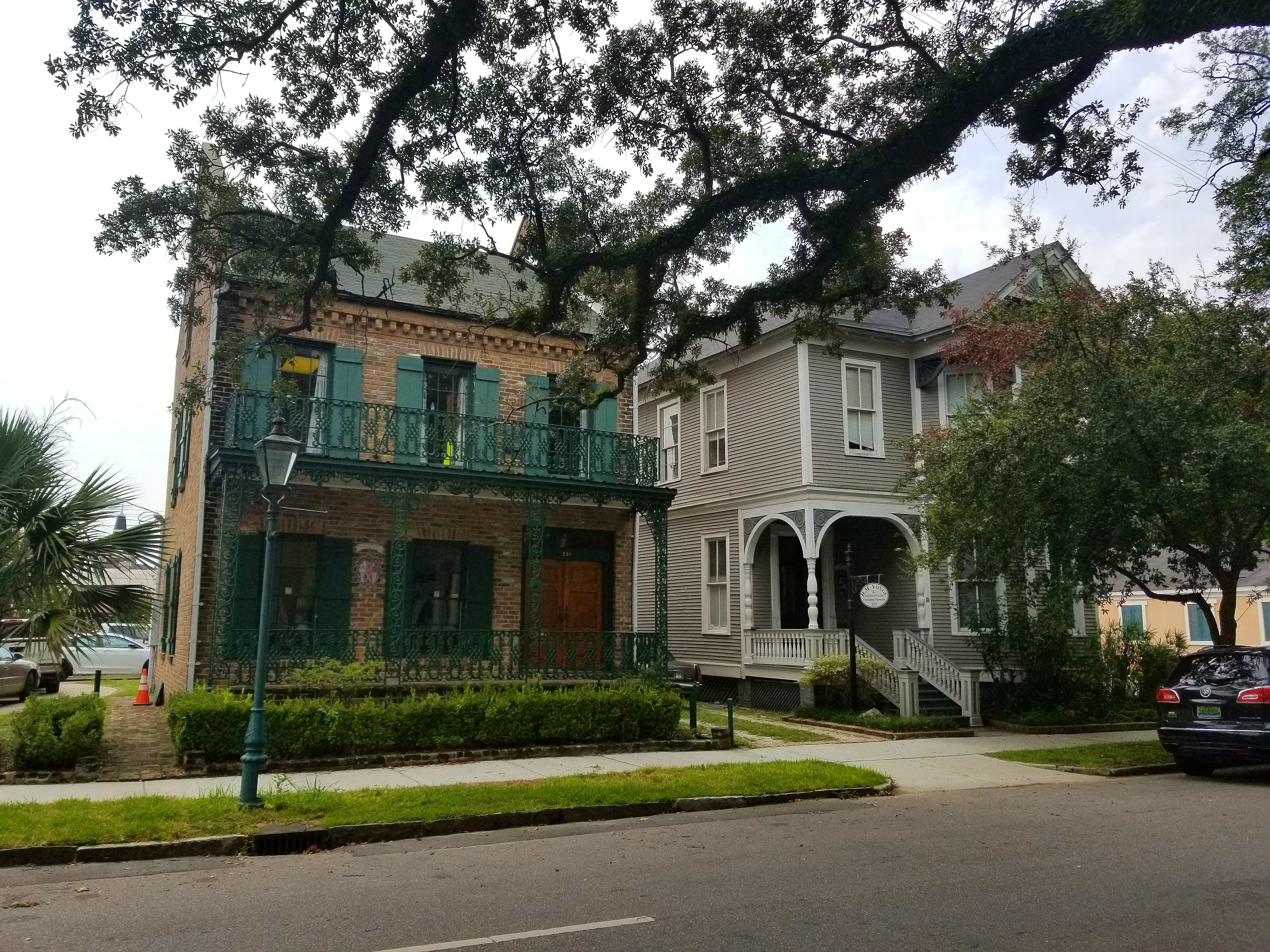
251 & 253 St. Anthony Street - September 2017
