= Waterman Steamship Corporation =

Deep sea ocean carrier

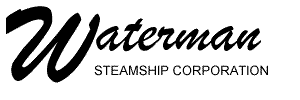

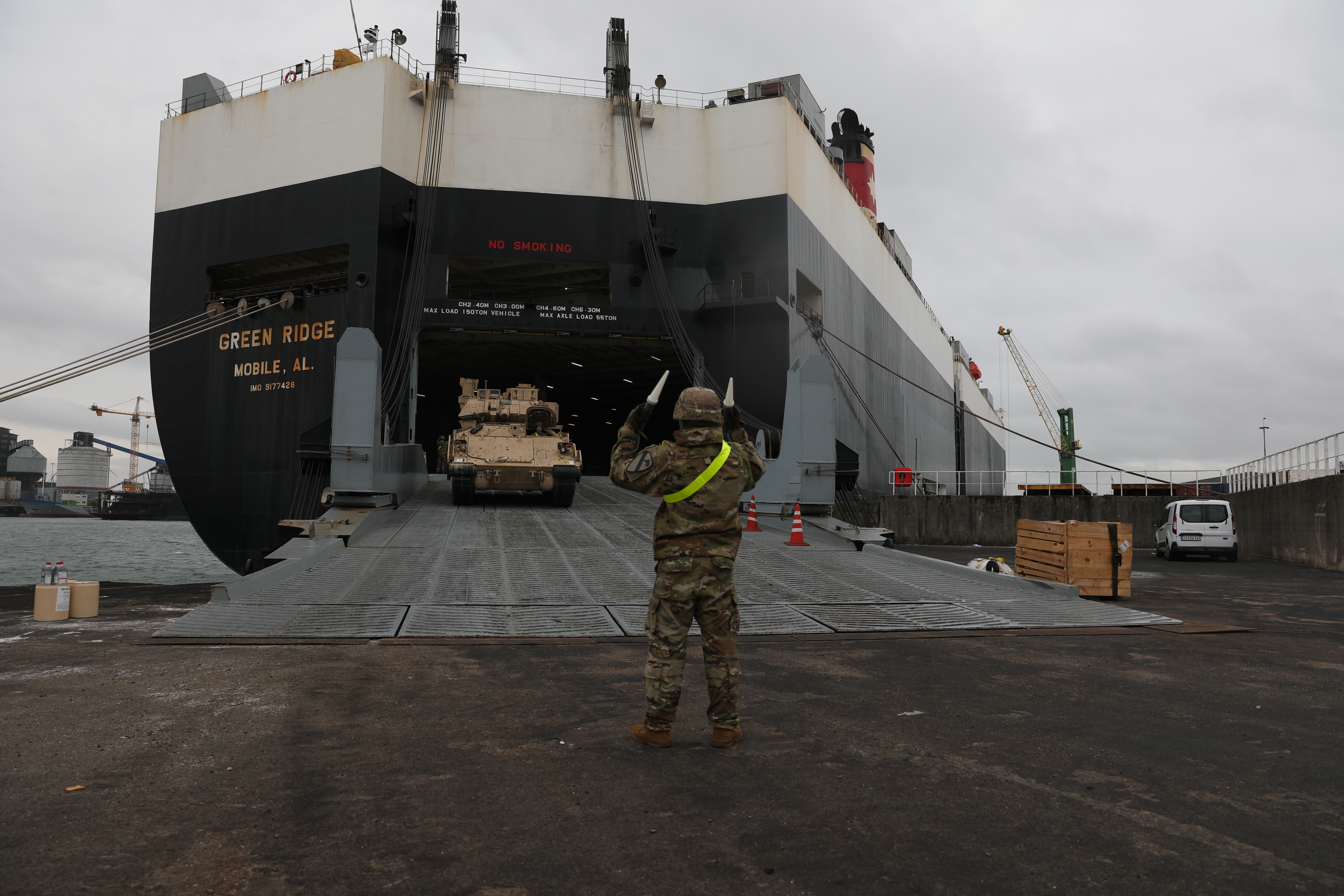
- Founded: 1919
- Headquarters: Mobile, Alabama, United States
- Services: Container shipping and Roll-on/roll-off
- Parent: SEACOR Holdings
- Website: https://watermanlogistics.com/

Waterman is an American deep sea ocean carrier, specializing in liner services and time charter contracts. It is owned by SEACOR Holdings.

== History ==
Waterman was founded in 1919 in Mobile, Alabama by John Barnett Waterman, Henry Crawford Slaton, T.M. Stevens, W.D. Bellingrath, and C.W. Hempstead following their departure from the British-owned Elder Dempster Steamship Company. Waterman and associates started with just one ship, the Eastern Sun leased from the U.S. Shipping Board for service to Liverpool and Manchester.

In 1955, McLean Industries, Inc. purchased the stock of Waterman Steamship Corporation from the stockholders. From its single-ship beginnings, Waterman had amassed a fleet of 125 ships, owned and operated its own shipbuilding and repair yards, owned or controlled three other shipping companies and employed thousands of workers. The company maintained about 40 years of business relationship with Exxon Corporation, which exclusively supplied the company's fleet with gas and bunker fuel oil. In 2017, SEACOR Holdings acquired Waterman parent International Shipholding Corporation. In 2019, sister company Central Gulf Lines took the Waterman name.

The former Waterman Steamship Corporation building on Saint Joseph Street remains a prominent building in the downtown Mobile skyline. It was sold to Darryl Smith of Hammond, LA in 2017. It opened in 1950 and is famous for its extensive murals in the lobby and a large rotating globe. The globe can now be seen on display at the Mitchell Center at the University of South Alabama.

== See also ==
- Mobile Seamen's Club Building
