= Paterson House (Mobile, Alabama) =

Historic house in Alabama, United States

- U.S. National Register of Historic Places
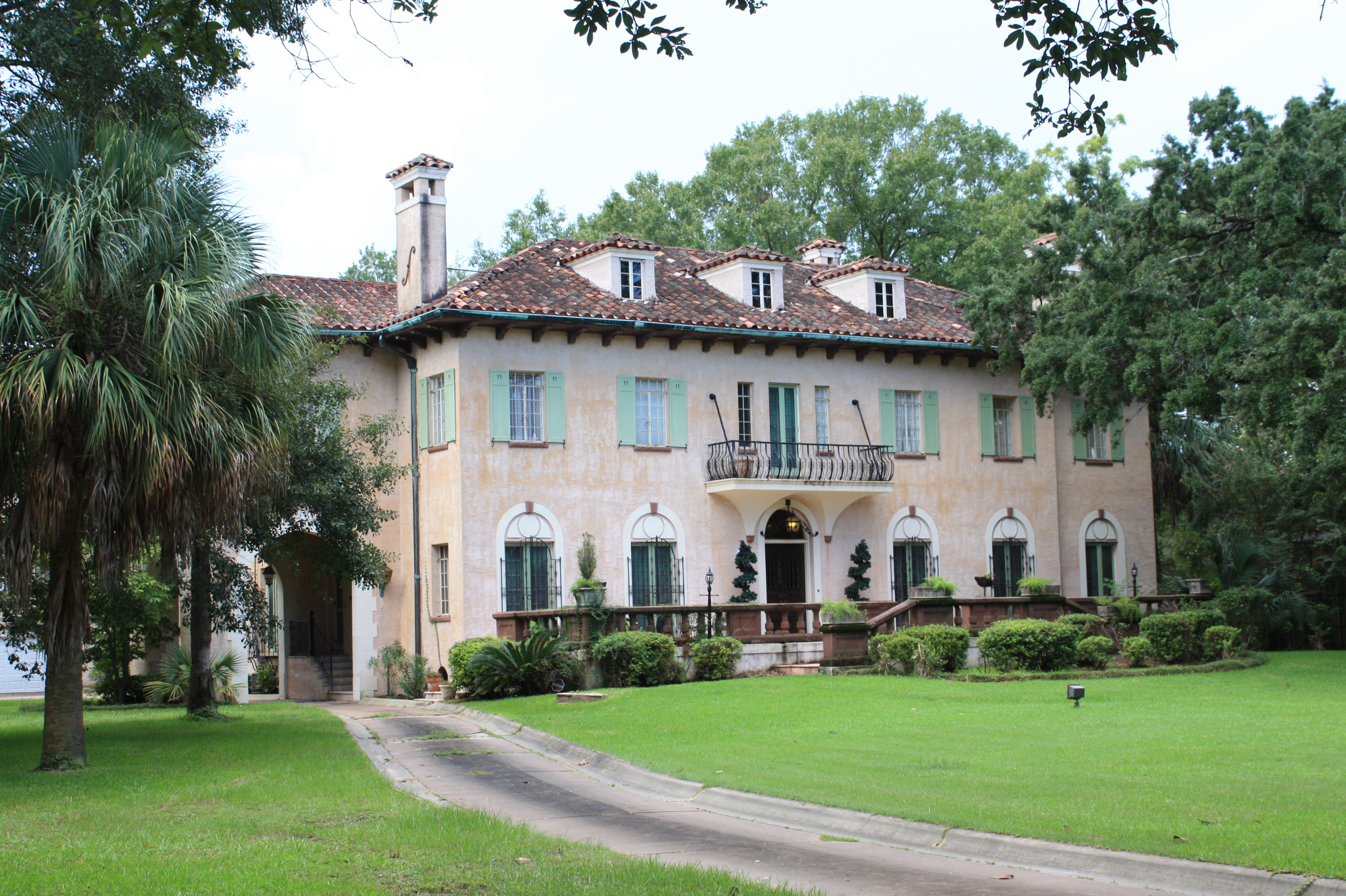

- Location within Mobile, Alabama Location within Alabama Location within the United States
- Location: 1673 Government Street, Mobile, Alabama
- Coordinates: 30°40′41″N 88°4′44″W
- Built: 1927
- Architect: Platt Roberts
- Architectural style: Mediterranean Revival
- NRHP reference No.: 86001065
- Added to NRHP: May 15, 1986

The Paterson House is a historic residence in Mobile, Alabama, United States. The 8,000-square-foot (740 m^{2}) Mediterranean Revival style house was completed in 1927. It was designed by local architect Platt Roberts, who later designed Mobile's 16-story Waterman Building. It was added to the National Register of Historic Places on May 15, 1986, based on its architectural significance.
