= USS Inca (1898) =

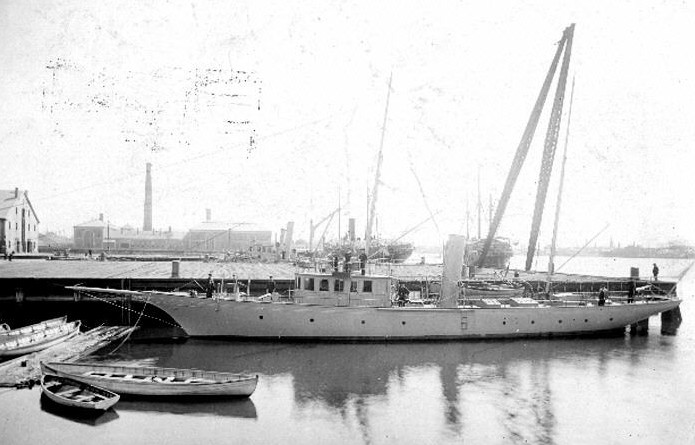
- USS Inca at the Boston Navy Yard, Charlestown, Massachusetts, 9 November 1898.

History

United States
- Name: USS Inca
- Builder: George Lawley & Son, South Boston, Massachusetts
- Launched: 1898
- Acquired: 13 June 1898
- Commissioned: 15 June 1898
- Decommissioned: 27 August 1898
- Fate: Turned over to the Massachusetts militia which she served until 1908

General characteristics
- Type: Yacht
- Displacement: 120 long tons (120 t)
- Length: 114 ft (35 m)
- Beam: 18 ft (5.5 m)
- Draft: 7 ft (2.1 m)
- Propulsion: steam engine, screw-driven
- Armament: 1 × 11-pounder gun

USS Inca was a small 120-long-ton (120 t) yacht acquired by the United States Navy during the Spanish–American War. It was outfitted with an 11-pounder gun and, for a short while, patrolled Boston Harbor, before being turned over to the Massachusetts militia as a training ship, a role it retained until 1908.

== Service history ==
Inca—a screw steamer—was built in 1898 by George Lawley & Son, South Boston, Massachusetts, and was acquired by the Navy from F. B. McQuesten of Boston, Massachusetts, on 13 June 1898. She commissioned on 15 June. Inca was assigned to Boston harbor during the Spanish–American War, serving as a patrol and training vessel. She decommissioned on 27 August 1898, and was turned over to the Massachusetts Militia, which she served as a training ship until 1908.
