= USS Inca (ID-3219) =

Tugboat of the United States Navy

History

United States
- Name: USS Inca
- Namesake: Former names retained
- Builder: J. H. Dialogue and Sons, Camden, New Jersey
- Laid down: date unknown
- Completed: 1879
- Acquired: by the Navy 31 July 1918
- Recommissioned: 2 August 1918 as USS Inca (ID-3219)
- Decommissioned: 1 February 1919
- Stricken: 1 February 1919
- Homeport: Parris Island, South Carolina
- Fate: Not known

General characteristics
- Type: Tugboat
- Tonnage: 103 tons
- Length: 101 ft (31 m)
- Beam: 20 ft (6.1 m)
- Draft: 7 ft 9 in (2.36 m)
- Propulsion: not known
- Speed: 12 knots
- Complement: not known
- Armament: none
- Armor: steel hull

USS Inca (ID-3219) was a tugboat acquired by the U.S. Navy during World War I. She was assigned to the Parris Island, South Carolina, Marine barracks. She served until 1 February 1919.

== Constructed in Camden, New Jersey ==
The fourth ship to be so named, Inca, an iron tug, was built in 1879 by J. H. Dialogue & Sons, Camden, New Jersey; and acquired by the Navy 31 July 1918. She commissioned 2 August 1918.

== World War I service ==
The tug was assigned to the 6th Naval District, headquartered at Charleston, South Carolina, and operated until after World War I ended at Parris Island Marine Barracks, South Carolina.

== Post-war disposition ==
She was stricken from the Navy List 1 February 1919.
