= USS Inca (1911) =

U.S. Navy ferryboat

History

United States
- Name: USS Inca
- Owner: U.S. Navy
- Builder: Herreshoff Manufacturing Company, Bristol, Rhode Island
- Completed: 1911
- Acquired: by the Navy 4 December 1911
- Commissioned: 1911
- Stricken: 28 February 1939

General characteristics
- Type: Ferryboat
- Length: 100 ft (30 m)
- Beam: 28 ft (8.5 m)
- Propulsion: steam engine

USS Inca was a ferryboat constructed for the U.S. Navy in 1911. She served the Navy at major American naval facilities located at Newport, Rhode Island; Norfolk, Virginia; and Philadelphia, Pennsylvania. She conducted her ferrying services through World War I and then continued her work until the late 1930s, when she was finally struck by the Navy.

== Service history ==
The second ship to be so named by the U.S. Navy, Inca, a steam ferry, was built for the Navy by Herreshoff Manufacturing Co., Bristol, Rhode Island, in 1911, and accepted by the Navy 4 December 1911. She provided ferry service for Naval Training Station, Newport, Rhode Island, until about 1920, when she was assigned to the Norfolk, Virginia, area. The ferry remained in service there until the thirties, when she moved to Philadelphia, Pennsylvania. Inca was stricken from the Navy List on 28 February 1939.
