= USS Inca (SP-1212) =

Patrol vessel of the United States Navy

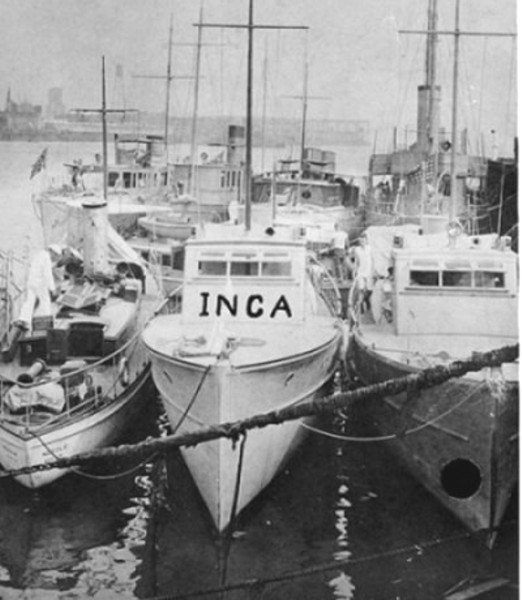
- USS Inca (SP-1212) probably photographed circa July 1917, while undergoing conversion for Navy service.

History

United States
- Name: USS Inca
- Namesake: Former names retained.
- Owner: F. B. McQuesten of Boston, Massachusetts.
- Builder: Herreshoff Manufacturing Company, Bristol, Rhode Island
- Laid down: date unknown
- Launched: date unknown
- Completed: 1917
- Acquired: leased by the Navy 28 July 1917
- Commissioned: 28 July 1917 as USS Inca (SP 1212) at Boston, Massachusetts
- Decommissioned: 17 April 1919
- Renamed: USS SP-1212 in 1918
- Stricken: 1919 (est.)
- Home port: Boston, Massachusetts; Hampton Roads, Virginia
- Fate: Returned to her owner, 17 April 1919

General characteristics
- Type: Motorboat
- Tonnage: 23 tons
- Length: 62 ft 4 in (19.00 m)
- Beam: 10 ft 11 in (3.33 m)
- Draft: 2 ft 6 in (0.76 m)
- Propulsion: not known
- Speed: 21 knots
- Complement: not known
- Armament: One 1-pounder gun

USS Inca (SP-1212) was a 62-foot-long motorboat leased by the U.S. Navy during World War I. She was outfitted as a patrol craft, but was additionally assigned other duties, such as rescue craft, seaplane tender, and dispatch boat. She served in the Boston, Massachusetts, and Hampton Roads, Virginia, waterways until war's end when she was returned to her owner.

== Constructed in Rhode Island ==
The third ship to be so named by the U.S. Navy, Inca was a motorboat, built in 1917 and acquired by the Navy from her owner, F. B. McQuesten of Boston, Massachusetts. USS Inca, a 23-ton motor patrol boat, was one of a group of nine motorboats built by Herreshoff Manufacturing Company, Bristol, Rhode Island, in 1917 in the expectation that their private owners would make them available for First World War service.

She was acquired by the Navy in July 1917 and commissioned 28 July 1917 at Boston.

== World War I service ==
A versatile craft, Inca was first assigned to the First Naval District and patrolled outer Boston Harbor. She also performed coast convoy duties with submarines during this period, and acted as test ship for submarine signaling and detector devices.

She was reassigned to Fifth Naval District in October 1917 and arrived at Hampton Roads, Virginia, on 3 November. Inca's job was to serve as rescue ship for aircraft from the Naval Air Station on flights over the Chesapeake Bay and Potomac River.

She also served as a seaplane tender during 1918, and spent time on harbor patrol in Hampton Roads. Inca was assigned 26 July 1918 to the Industrial Department, Hampton Roads, as a dispatch boat, and remained on this duty for the rest of her time in Navy service. Inca lost her name in 1918 and was thereafter called simply USS SP-1212.

== Post-war disposition ==
Inca was returned to her owner on 17 April 1919 after the end of the wartime emergency.
