= SEACOR Holdings =

U.S. marine services company

- Company type: Privately held company
- Industry: Petroleum industry
- Founded: 1989; 36 years ago
- Founder: Charles Fabrikant
- Headquarters: Fort Lauderdale, Florida, United States
- Owner: American Industrial Partners
- Website: www.seacorholdings.com

SEACOR Holdings, based in Fort Lauderdale, Florida, provides equipment and services to the offshore petroleum industry and the marine transportation industry. An American corporation, the company holds a 70% ownership stake in a bioethanol plant located in Illinois.

SEACOR is a longstanding family enterprise encompassing a broad spectrum of maritime activities within North America. Its portfolio spans sectors including Jones Act shipping, U.S. and international towing, inland tug and barge operations, military logistics, disaster response, Caribbean breakbulk services, and additional ventures facilitated through joint venture partnerships. Additionally, SEACOR has entered and exited sectors such as offshore drilling, OSV (Offshore Support Vessel) operations, helicopter services, spill response, and other related domains.

Within its Offshore Marine Services division, Seacor provides towing and support services, including anchor handling tugs, on a global scale, primarily serving the oil industry. Its subsidiary, SCF Marine, operates in inland shipping within the United States, as well as along the Río Paraná and Río Magdalena in South America. In the Gulf of Mexico and the Caribbean, Seacor Ocean Transport conducts its operations.

Seacor Holdings collaborates with the railroad company Genesee and Wyoming in a 50:50 joint venture, operating the CG Railway. Since the year 2000, this railway has facilitated rail ferry services from Mobile, Alabama, to Coatzacoalcos, Mexico.

== History ==
SEACOR was founded on 7 November 1989 by Charles Fabrikant. In December of the same year, Fabrikant and a consortium of investors acquired NICOR Marine, the marine unit of Nicor Gas, and subsequently rebranded it as SEACOR.

In 1992, the company presented its initial public offering, entering the New York Stock Exchange under the symbol CKOR. During the 1990s, Seacor participated in Chile's initiative to construct and operate offshore drilling platforms.

In 2002, Tex-Air, a provider of helicopter services for supplying oil and gas offshore platforms, was purchased. This was followed by the expansion of helicopter operations in 2004 through the acquisition of Era Aviation. In 2005, Seacor acquired Seabulk International Inc., which enabled the company to engage in the transportation of crude oil, including offshore and port towing services.

In March 2012, the company sold National Response Corporation and its affiliated businesses to J.F. Lehman & Company.

In January 2013, the company sold its energy trading division to Par Pacific Holdings. Also in 2013, the helicopter business was spun off as Era Group.

In 2017, the company acquired International Shipholding Corporation, including Waterman Steamship Corporation.

In 2018, the company acquired full ownership of CLEANCOR Energy Solutions LLC, while the company divested its stake in the aviation company Hawker Pacific.

In April 2021, American Industrial Partners, a private equity firm, acquired the company at a value of US$1 billion.

== Mergers & Acquisitions ==
Target Company	Year of Purchase	Purchase Value	Type	Ref
NICOR Marine	1989		Acquisition	
John E Graham & Sons	1995	US$73 Million	Acquisition	
Smit Intl-Offshore Supply Ship	1996	US$182 Million	Acquisition	
ERST/O’Brien's	1997		Acquisition	
Tex-Air	2002		Acquisition	
Era Aviation	2004		Acquisition	
Seabulk International Inc.	2005		Merger	
International Shipholding Corp	2017		Acquisition	
Jones Act Shipping Company	2021			

== See also ==
- CG Railway
