= USS Marshall =

Fletcher-class destroyer

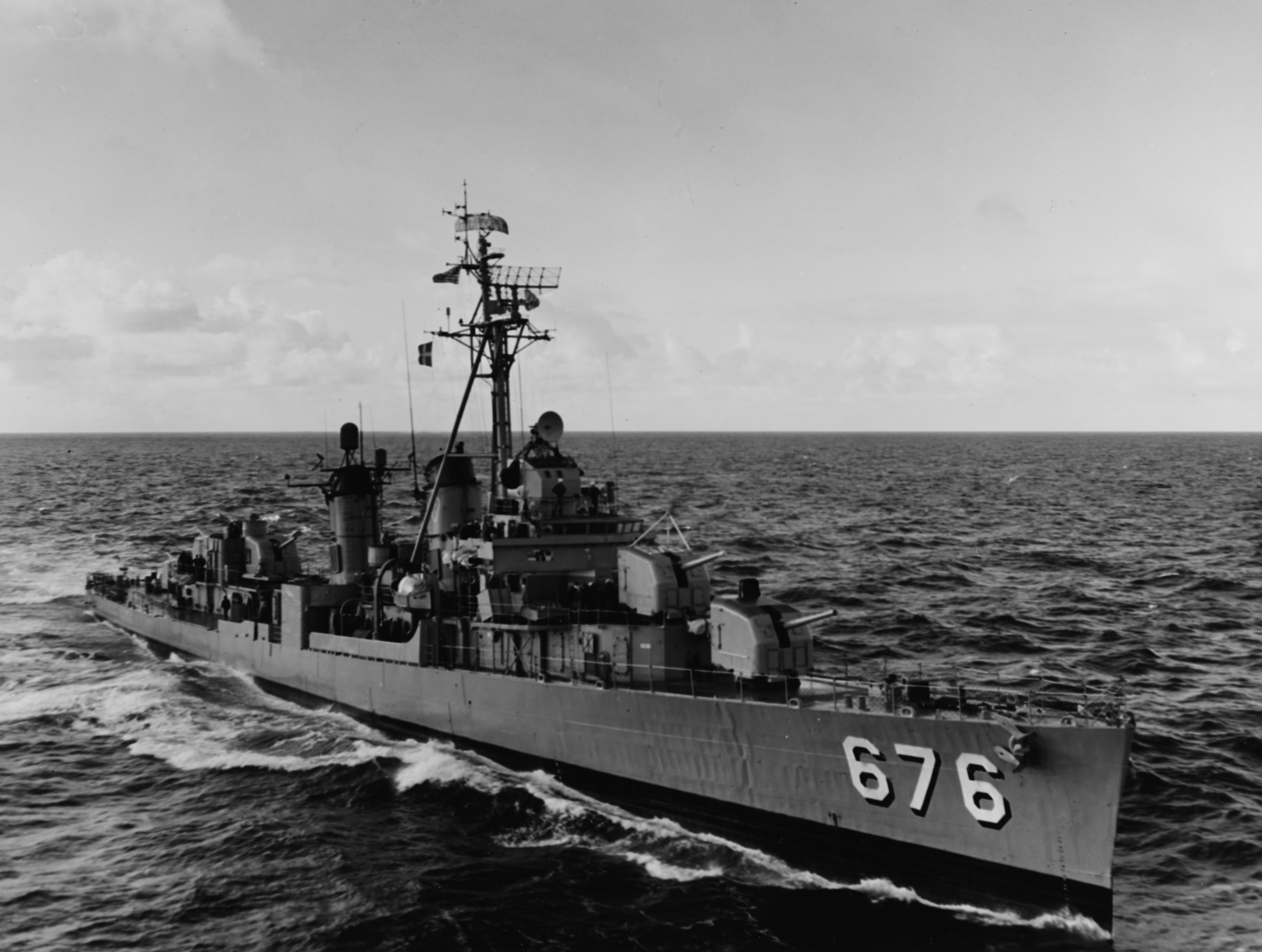
- USS Marshall (DD-676), pulling alongside USS Coral Sea (CVA-43), during refueling exercises off the California coast, 7 March 1963.

History

United States
- Namesake: Thomas W. Marshall, Jr.
- Builder: Federal Shipbuilding & Dry Dock Co., Kearny, N.J.
- Laid down: 29 April 1943
- Launched: 29 August 1943
- Commissioned: 16 October 1943
- Decommissioned: 19 July 1969
- Stricken: 19 July 1969
- Honours and awards: 12 Battle Stars
- Fate: Sold for scrap, July 1970

General characteristics
- Class & type: Fletcher-class destroyer
- Displacement: 2,050 tons
- Length: 376 ft 5 in (114.7 m)
- Beam: 39 ft 8 in (12.1 m)
- Draft: 17 ft 9 in (5.4 m)
- Propulsion: 60,000 shp (45 MW); geared turbines; 2 propellers
- Speed: 38 knots (70 km/h; 44 mph)
- Range: 6,500 nautical miles at 15 kn; (12,000 km at 30 km/h)
- Complement: 319
- Armament: 5 × 5 in (130 mm)/38 guns, 10 × 40 mm AA guns, 7 × 20 mm AA guns, 10 × 21 in torpedo tubes, 6 × depth charge projectors, 2 × depth charge tracks

USS Marshall (DD-676) was a Fletcher-class destroyer of the United States Navy.

== Namesake ==
Thomas Worth Marshall Jr. was born on 22 December 1906 in Washington, D.C. He attended the United States Naval Academy beginning in 1926. Following graduation in 1930, Ensign Marshall served on the battleship USS Nevada and received flight training at Hampton Roads, Virginia and Naval Air Station Pensacola, Florida. He subsequently was an officer on board the cruisers USS Marblehead and USS Houston and the destroyer USS John D. Ford. Lieutenant (junior grade) Marshall was a member of the staff of Commander in Chief, Asiatic Fleet in 1934–1935.

Following instruction at the Submarine Base, New London, Connecticut, Marshall served on the submarine USS S-42 until 1937, when he began duty with the Office of Naval Communications, in Washington, D.C. Lieutenant Marshall became Executive Officer of the destroyer USS Jacob Jones in 1939 and served on it for the rest of his life. Promoted to the rank of Lieutenant Commander, effective at the beginning of 1942, he was killed in action when Jacob Jones was torpedoed by U-578 and sunk off Cape May, New Jersey on 28 February 1942.

== Construction and commissioning ==
Marshall was laid down by the Federal Shipbuilding & Dry Dock Co., Kearny, N.J., 29 April 1943; launched 29 August 1943; sponsored by Mrs. Thomas W. Marshall, mother of Lt. Comdr. Marshall; and commissioned 16 October 1943.

== World War II ==
Marshall's first big assignment came while she was still on her shakedown cruise off Bermuda. Speeding from that area, she rendezvoused in mid-Atlantic with Iowa, 13 December 1943, to escort President Franklin D. Roosevelt back from the Big Three Conference at Tehran (28 November to 1 December).

On 6 January 1944, Marshall departed New York for Pearl Harbor, arriving on the 28th. She remained at Pearl Harbor, undergoing further training and providing escort services to battle-damaged ships returning for repairs, until mid-March. Then, with Task Group 58.2 (TG 58.2), she sailed for Majuro, arriving on the 20th.

The Fast Carrier Task Force (then 5th Fleet's TF 58, later 3rd Fleet's TF 38), with Marshall taking station in the antisubmarine screen, departed Majuro 22 March to conduct aerial sorties against Palau, 30th, and Woleai, 1 April. Marshall next participated in TF 58's strikes against Japanese installations at Wakde and Hollandia in New Guinea, 21 to 27 April. On the 29th, Truk was the recipient of the forces' aerial message, while on the 30th her battleships commenced the bombardment of Ponape and her cruisers shelled Satawan. In May, the force moved against Wake and Marcus Islands, with Marshall assigned to join in an antishipping sweep north of the latter.

The next month, the task force was called on to support amphibious operations in the Marianas. On the 17th, the force headed west to intercept a Japanese force reported en route to the Marianas to support enemy troops fighting on Saipan, Tinian, Guam, Rota, and Pagan Islands. On the 19th, the Battle of the Philippine Sea commenced. In the course of the 2-day battle, the Japanese Fleet lost three aircraft carriers and 395 carrier planes (92 percent of her carrier plane strength). Marshall was credited with an assist in splashing two of those planes. For the next month and a half, Marshall continued to support operations in the southern Marianas, interrupted only by participation in the strikes against Chichi Jima and Iwo Jima, 4 July, and against Palau, Ulithi, and Yap, 23 to 27 July.

Marshall returned to Eniwetok in mid-August for voyage repairs and upkeep, departing again on the 23rd for operations in the Palau Islands. As a unit of TF 38 (formerly 58), she took part in the Palau and Philippine operations 6 to 24 September. On 12 September, she picked up 44 Japanese survivors from Natori, sunk 18 August by Hardhead.

After repair and replenishment at newly won Ulithi, Marshall's task group got underway 6 October for strikes against Okinawa, 10th, and Formosa, 12th to 14th. Marshall was then ordered to provide antiaircraft cover for Canberra during airstrikes against enemy strongholds throughout the Philippines. On the 22d, she rejoined her task group in a search for the enemy in the Sibuyan Sea and the Mindoro Strait. On the 25th, the Task Force moved north towards Cape Engaño, while Marshall joined TG 34.5 proceeding to San Bernardino Strait to intercept units of the Japanese Fleet withdrawing from Leyte Gulf. In the first hours of the 26th, Nowaki was sighted and sunk by the group. Returning to the fast carrier force on the 31st, Marshall continued to operate in the Philippines until the end of the year.

The new year, 1945, brought further strikes against the Philippines and, with operations in the South China Sea, against Formosa and the coast of China. On 10 February, Marshall, with TG 58.2, sailed for the enemy's home islands and on the 16th and 17th the carrier planes flew against Tokyo. The force then sped southeast to support the landings on Iwo Jima, returning to the Honshū area for further strikes on the 25th. By 1 March the task force was off Okinawa, commencing strikes in preparation for that campaign. On the 15th, strikes were directed against Kyūshū. On the 19th, Franklin received a direct hit and Marshall joined in the rescue, taking off 212 of her crew, and, on the 20th, escorted the listing ship back to Ulithi.

During the Okinawa campaign Marshall operated as advanced radar picket for her task group and escorted damaged ships to safety, 8 April to 9 May. On 9 May, she departed for Ulithi, continuing on to Leyte and finally San Francisco, arriving 6 July for overhaul. Before completion, the war ended and Marshall inactivated. Decommissioned in December, she was placed in the Reserve Fleet at San Diego.

== Post-War service ==
On 27 April 1951 Marshall was recommissioned and on 22 August joined TF 77 in the Sea of Japan, once more screening aircraft carriers in combat, this time against Communist forces in Korea. During this tour in the Far East, Marshall served with the Formosa Strait patrol and with the United Nations Blockade and Escort Force off Korea's east coast as well as on carrier screen duty in the Yellow Sea.

In March 1952, the destroyer returned to San Diego for overhaul and on 4 October sailed again for the Far East. Arriving on 28 October, she once again began a Korean combat tour as a screening unit for carriers. In mid-November, she was detached and, after two weeks of hunter-killer operations, joined TF 95 in the bombardment of Wonsan on 10 December. On 7 January 1953, she steamed south to join the Formosa Strait patrol. In mid-February, Marshall rejoined TF 77. Two months later, her western Pacific deployment completed, she headed home, arriving at San Diego on 6 May.

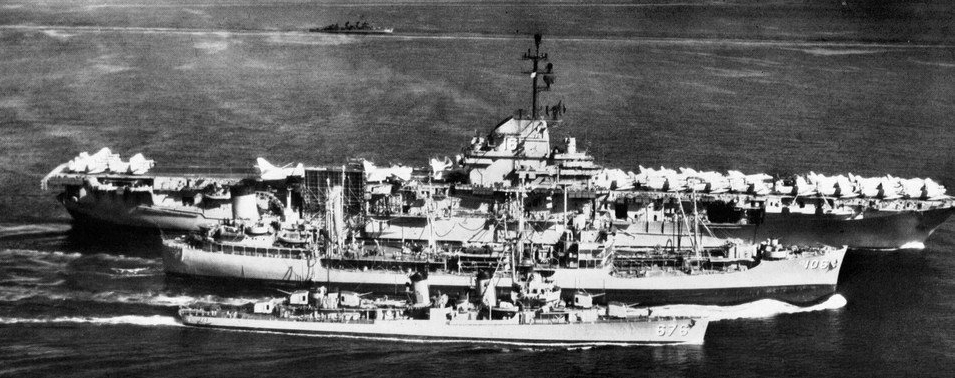
The U.S. carrier USS Lexington (CVA-16) with a supply ship and USS Marshall (DD-676) off Taiwan during the crisis.

For the next 11 years, Marshall operated as a unit of the Pacific Fleet. Homeported at San Diego, she was regularly deployed with the 7th Fleet in the western Pacific. While with that fleet she operated primarily with TF 77 and in 1960 was a unit of a carrier strike group standing by in the South China Sea during the uprising of the Communist Pathet Lao in Laos.

On 1 September 1964, Marshall changed her home port to Tacoma, Washington There she relieved Watts as the Naval Reserve training ship for the 13th Naval District. On 21 October 1964, a small fire started in the substructure near the outer end of Todd Pacific Shipyards Repair Pier 7. Fueled by creosote and oil-soaked timbers, the fire soon engulfed Repair Pier 7 and quickly spread to the east wing-wall of Drydock No. 2, where Marshall was sitting high and dry, undergoing a $300,000 overhaul. The flames spread so rapidly the destroyer's captain, Commander J. F. Stanfil Jr., ordered his 108 crewmen off the ship to join the firefighters and shipyard workers battling the fire.

With her active service completed, Marshall was stricken from the Naval Vessel Register 19 July 1969 and sold for scrapping in July 1970 to Zidell Explorations Co., Portland, Oregon for $80,596.66.

== Awards ==
Marshall received eight battle stars for World War II service and four for Korean War service.
