= USS Bagaduce (AT-21) =

Tugboat of the United States Navy

History

United States
- Name: USS Bagaduce
- Namesake: Bagaduce River in Maine
- Builder: Ferguson Steel and Iron Company; Buffalo, New York
- Cost: $537,807.70 (hull and machinery)
- Laid down: 16 July 1918 as Ammonoosuc
- Renamed: Bagaduce, 24 February 1919
- Launched: 5 April 1919
- Commissioned: 18 September 1919
- Decommissioned: 2 May 1922
- Recommissioned: 9 June 1924
- Decommissioned: 20 April 1932
- Recommissioned: 22 June 1938
- Decommissioned: 22 June 1946
- Stricken: 31 July 1946
- Fate: Transferred to the USMC for disposal, 9 January 1947.

General characteristics
- Class & type: Bagaduce-class fleet tug
- Displacement: 1,000 tonnes (980 long tons; 1,100 short tons)
- Length: 156 ft 8 in (47.75 m)
- Beam: 30 ft (9.1 m)
- Draft: 14 ft 7 in (4.45 m)
- Speed: 12.4 knots (23.0 km/h; 14.3 mph)
- Complement: 44
- Armament: 2 x 3" gun mounts

USS Bagaduce (AT-21/ATO-21) was the lead ship of the Bagaduce class of fleet tugs for the United States Navy. She was the first ship of the U.S. Navy of that name, and is named for the Bagaduce River and a peninsula in Hancock County, Maine.

Bagaduce (Tug No. 21) was laid down on 16 July 1918 at Buffalo, New York, by the Ferguson Steel and Iron Company; briefly named Ammonoosuc in February 1919; renamed Bagaduce on 24 February 1919; launched 5 April 1919; and commissioned at Buffalo on 18 September 1919.

Constructed as part of the World War I building program, Bagaduce was the first of 19 new steel tugs designed to serve as minesweepers and conduct heavy-duty towing work at navy yards. Assigned to the 3d Naval District, she operated at the New York Navy Yard and off the New England coast, providing towing and pilot services to various ships of the fleet. Bagaduce was designated AT-21 on 17 July 1920 when the Navy adopted the alphanumeric system of hull classification and identification. After almost two years of service out of New York, the tug was caught up in the massive fleet reduction caused by the 1922 Washington Naval Conference. The budget cuts and manpower reductions that followed forced the Navy to decommission 376 ships. Bagaduce, one of 15 fleet tugs so affected, was decommissioned at the New York Navy Yard on 2 May 1922.

Bagaduce's inactivity, however, proved brief. Recommissioned on 9 June 1924, she resumed operations in the 3d Naval District, out of the New York Navy Yard. In early 1926, she transferred to the Washington Navy Yard, but that duty ended in June when she was temporarily returned to the 3d Naval District. The tug was assigned to the salvage of submarine S-51, which had been rammed and sunk by the steamship City of Rome off Point Judith, Rhode Island, on 25 September 1925. Bagaduce supported Falcon and Sagamore in raising the stricken submersible on 5 July and in towing her into New York three days later. Immediately afterwards, the tug was assigned to the 7th Naval District and arrived at Key West, Florida, on 2 August 1926.

Soon after the tug's arrival, on 18 September 1926, a devastating hurricane struck Miami. The next day, Bagaduce loaded nine tons of dry provisions and delivered them to that ravaged city. The tug also helped to clear the harbor of wreckage and supported the naval detachment dispatched from Key West in its efforts to guard the waterfront and post office. Bagaduce's involvement in relief efforts continued the following year, when, in late April, she moved to Vicksburg, Mississippi, to assist in refugee work and other operations connected with the 1927 flood of the Mississippi River. Her work came to a close on 16 June, and the tug returned to Key West.

A month later, on 11 July 1927, Bagaduce got underway for Coco Solo in the Canal Zone, where over succeeding months she provided services to ships and submarines passing through the canal until February 1929 when she returned to Key West. The tug continued normal support operations until early 1932 when she was withdrawn from the 7th Naval District, as part of a district reorganization plan, and decommissioned at Philadelphia on 20 April 1932.

Recommissioned on 22 June 1938 and assigned duty in the 11th Naval District, Bagaduce arrived at San Diego on 22 October. The tug remained on towing duty in California waters, serving the growing numbers of Pacific Fleet ships, into August 1943 when she changed operational control to the Commander, Western Sea Frontier. She continued towing duties through the end of the war, even after shifting her base of operations from San Diego to San Francisco on 16 December 1943. She was reclassified an old ocean tug and was redesignated ATO-21 on 15 May 1944.

Bagaduce was decommissioned at the Mare Island Naval Shipyard on 22 June 1946, her name was struck from the Naval Vessel Register on 31 July 1946, and she was transferred for disposal to the Maritime Commission at Suisun Bay, California, on 9 January 1947.

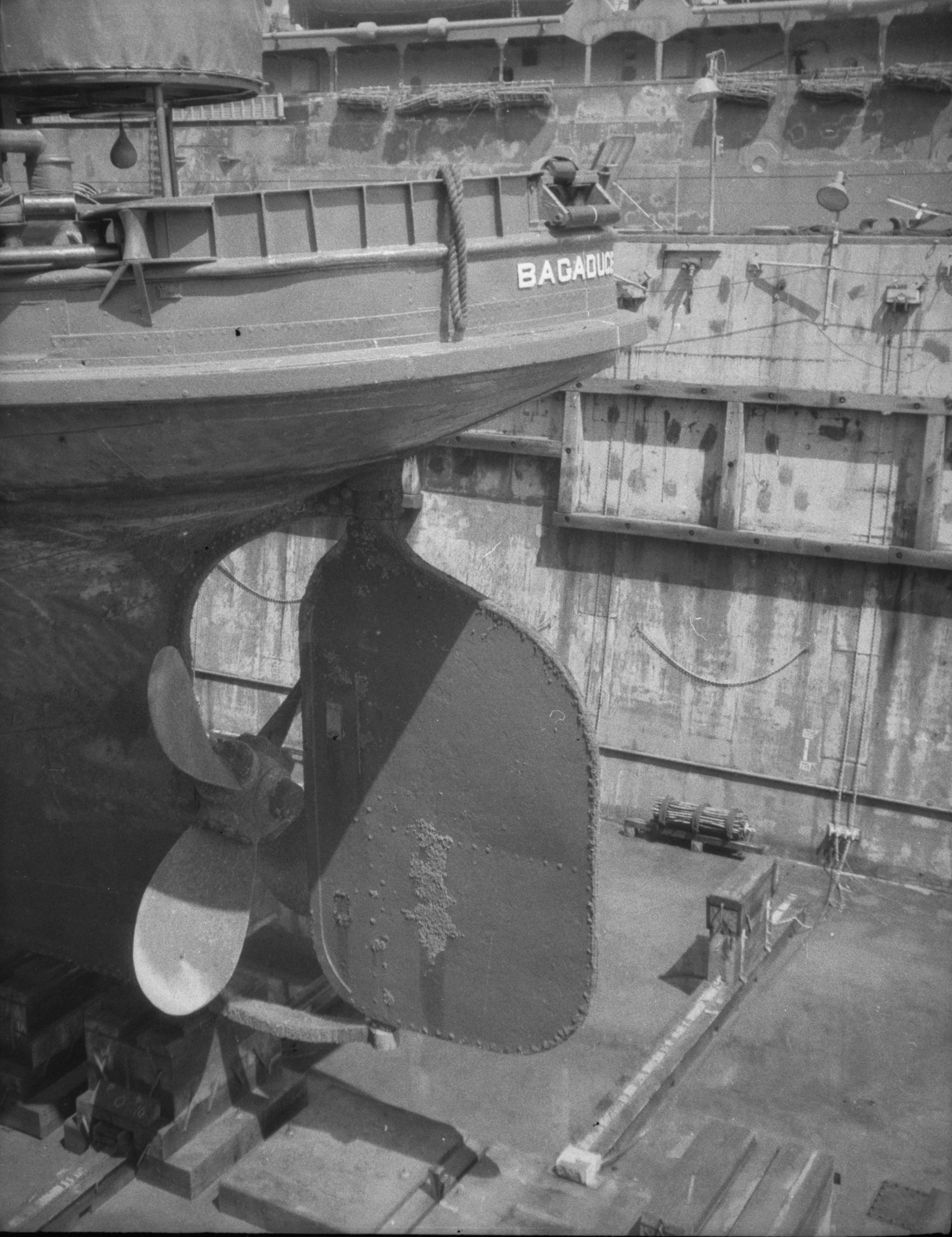
USS Bagaduce's stern at dry dock (Photo taken 1946)
