= USS Black =

Fletcher-class destroyer

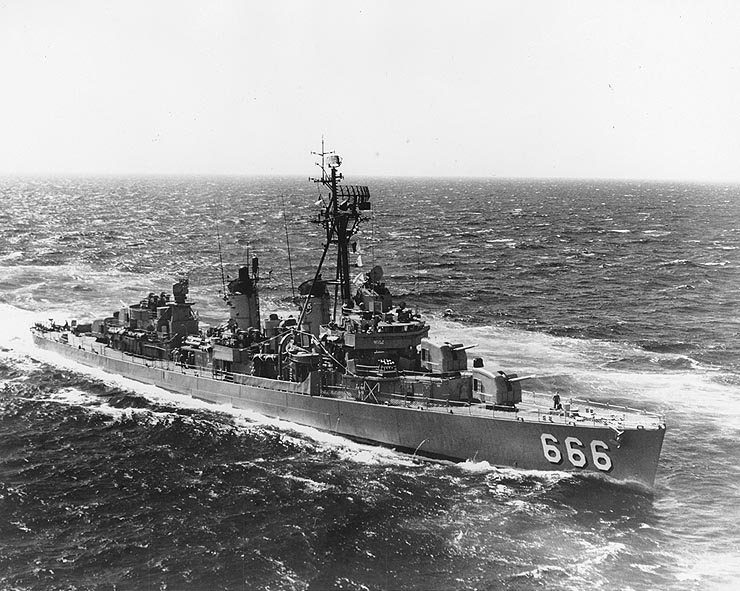
- USS Black (DD-666), Steaming at sea, c. 1968.

History

United States
- Namesake: Hugh David Black
- Builder: Federal Shipbuilding and Drydock Company, Kearny, New Jersey
- Laid down: 14 November 1942
- Launched: 28 March 1943
- Commissioned: 21 May 1943
- Decommissioned: 26 September 1969
- Stricken: 26 September 1969
- Fate: Sold for scrap, 17 February 1971

General characteristics
- Class & type: Fletcher-class destroyer
- Displacement: 2,050 tons
- Length: 376 ft 6 in (114.7 m)
- Beam: 39 ft 8 in (12.1 m)
- Draft: 17 ft 9 in (5.4 m)
- Propulsion: 60,000 shp (45,000 kW); 2 propellers
- Speed: 35 knots (65 km/h; 40 mph)
- Range: 6500 nm at 15 kn (12,000 km at 28 km/h)
- Complement: 329
- Armament: 5 × 5-inch 38 caliber guns, 4 × 40 mm AA guns, 4 × 20 mm AA guns, 10 × 21 inch (533 mm) torpedo tubes, 6 × depth charge projectors, 2 × depth charge tracks

USS Black (DD-666) was a Fletcher-class destroyer of the United States Navy.

== Namesake ==
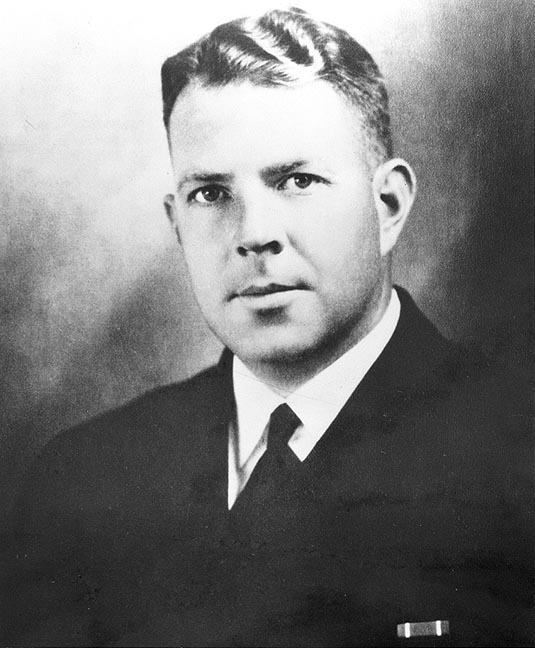
Hugh D. Black

Hugh David Black was born on 29 June 1903 in Oradell, New Jersey. He was appointed to the United States Naval Academy in 1922, graduated in 1926, and served on board USS Richmond, mainly in the Far East, between 1926 and 1928. During the next few years, he was an officer on board the battleship USS New York, the gunboat USS Asheville and the destroyers USS Parrott, USS Rizal and USS Montgomery. Lieutenant (junior grade) Black was assigned to the Naval Training Station, San Diego, California, in 1933 then served on board the destroyer USS Upshur and from 1935 to 1938 commanded the minesweeper USS Lark.

Lieutenant Black had duty with the Navy's Bureau of Navigation, in Washington, D.C., in 1938 and attended Harvard University for two years, beginning mid-1938. He was executive officer of the new destroyer USS Benson in 1940 into 1941. In March 1941, he took command of the destroyer USS Jacob Jones. Lieutenant Commander Black was killed when Jacob Jones was sunk by the German submarine U-578 on 28 February 1942.

== Construction and commissioning ==
Black was launched 28 March 1943 by Federal Shipbuilding and Dry Dock Co., Kearny, N.J.; sponsored by Frances Marie Black, née Frykholm, widow of Lieutenant Commander Black; and commissioned 21 May 1943.

== Service history ==
=== World War II ===
Black proceeded to Pearl Harbor, via San Diego, Calif., and reported for duty on 15 November 1943. Shortly thereafter, she steamed to Tarawa and was assigned screening duty off Tarawa Lagoon entrance. She continued this duty until 22 January 1944, with occasional diversion as escort for transports to the 180th meridian. On 15 January 1944 she rescued 22 survivors of two downed patrol aircraft 50 miles (95 km) south of Jaluit.

After seeing her first combat during the invasion of Majuro Atoll, Marshall Islands (29 January–8 February 1944), Black rendered fine service in

- the Aitape and Hollandia, New Guinea, landings (22 April – 7 May);
- Saipan invasion (11 June – 4 July);
- capture of Guam (21 July – 10 August);
- and Leyte operation (20–21 October and 13–14 November).

The destroyer then returned to San Francisco, Calif. for repairs which lasted until February 1945.

Repairs completed, she sailed to Ulithi where, upon arrival on 13 March, she reported to the Fast Carrier Task Force (then TF 58) for duty. Between 17 March and 30 May Black participated in the 5th and 3rd Fleet raids in support of the Okinawa operation. After a period of rest and upkeep at Leyte Gulf, Black took part in the 3rd Fleet operations against Japan (10 July – 15 August 1945) and, on 15 August, the day Japan agreed to surrender, was present during one of the Pacific War's final kamikaze attacks.

After the cessation of hostilities Black remained off Japan assisting in the occupation until 1 September when, as a unit of TF 72, she departed with the occupation forces for Inchon, Korea. She served in the Far East on occupation duty until 10 November 1945, when she left Tsingtao, China, for the United States. Upon arrival, Black reported for inactivation and was placed out of commission in reserve on 5 August 1946 at Long Beach, Calif.

=== 1951-1969 ===
Black was recommissioned on 18 July 1951 and reported to the Atlantic Fleet. She participated in type and fleet operations along the eastern seaboard and in the Caribbean until 10 January 1953 when she departed Norfolk, Va. for the Pacific, via the Panama Canal, on a round-the-world cruise. She arrived off the coast of Korea on 4 March and two days later commenced harassing fire on the beach. Black continued her Korean operations until 4 June 1953.

On 9 June, Black departed for Norfolk, via the Suez Canal, arriving on the east coast 6 August. Until January 1955, she conducted type training, fleet operations, and plane guard duties along the east coast and in the Caribbean. In January 1955 Black transferred to the Pacific Fleet arriving at Long Beach 26 January.

Over the next decade and a half, Black regularly crossed the great ocean to take her place as a unit of the 7th Fleet, serving as an aircraft carrier escort, taking part in antisubmarine warfare exercises, patrolling in the Taiwan Strait and visiting ports throughout the Far East. Her tenth, eleventh, twelfth, and thirteenth post-World War II Western Pacific deployments, beginning in early 1965, included Vietnam War service. Among her duties during this time were early participation in Operation Market Time coastal patrol and interdiction operations, providing naval gunfire support for forces ashore and screening carriers as they took the war to the North Vietnamese enemy.

Black's last overseas cruise ended in July 1969. She was decommissioned in late September of that year and sold for scrapping in February 1971.

== Awards ==
Black (DD-666) earned six battle stars for World War II service, two battle stars during the Korean conflict, and three battle stars for Vietnam service for a total of 11 battle stars.
