= Eagle-class patrol craft =

American anti-submarine vessels built in WWI

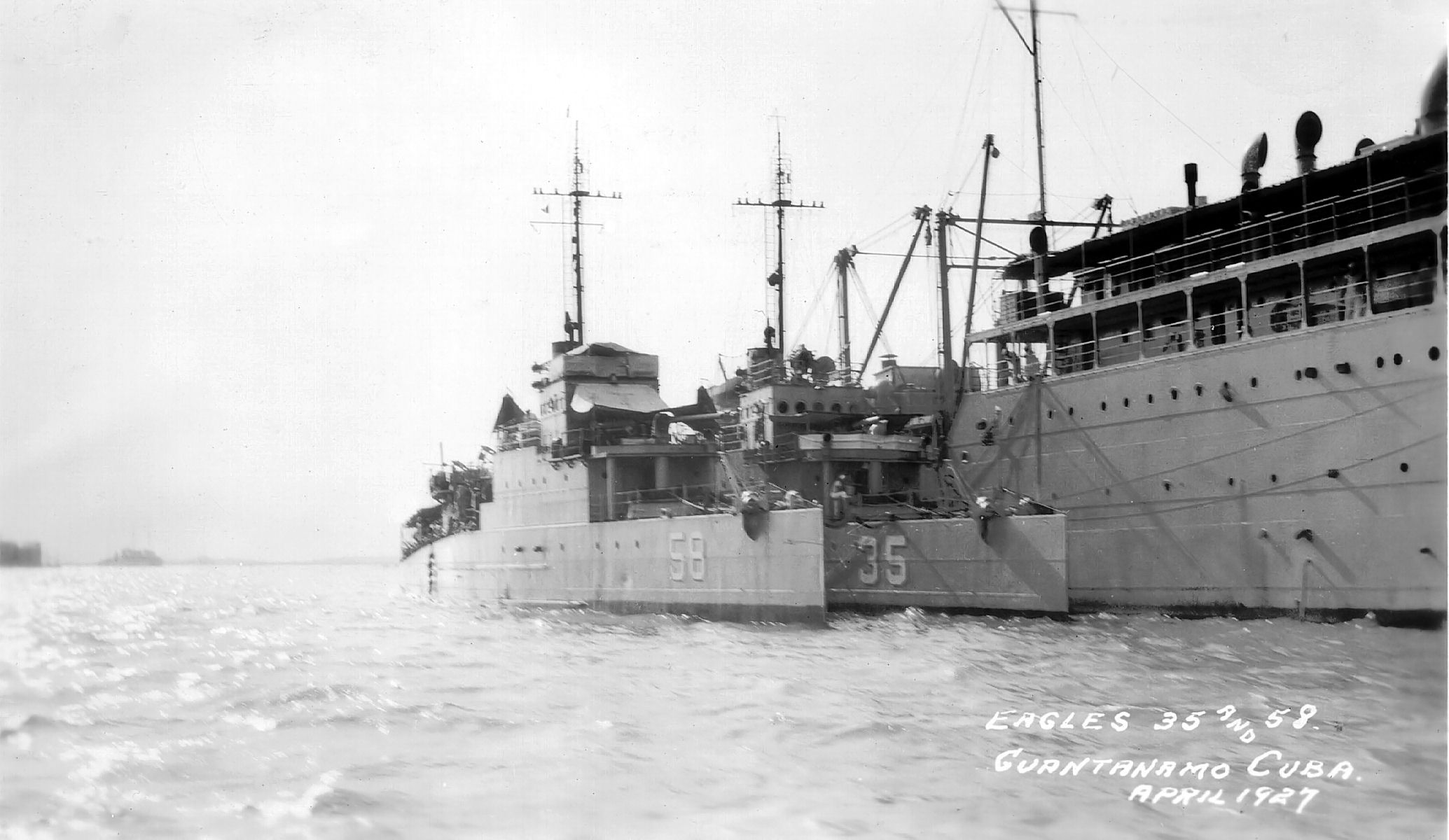
- Eagle 35 and Eagle 58

Class overview
- Name: Eagle
- Operators: United States Navy
- Completed: 60

General characteristics
- Type: Patrol craft
- Displacement: 615 long tons (625 t)
- Length: 200.8 ft (61.2 m)
- Beam: 33.1 ft (10.1 m)
- Draft: 8.5 ft (2.6 m)
- Propulsion: Poole geared steam turbine, 2,500 shp (1,864 kW); 1 screw
- Speed: 18.32 knots (33.93 km/h; 21.08 mph)
- Complement: 5 officers, 56 men
- Armament: 2 × 4"/50 caliber guns; 1 × 3"/50 caliber gun; 2 × .50 caliber(12.7 mm) machine guns; 1 × Y gun (Eagles 4 through 7 only)

The Eagle-class patrol craft were anti-submarine vessels of the United States Navy that were built during World War I using mass production techniques. They were steel-hulled ships smaller than contemporary destroyers but having a greater operational radius than the wooden-hulled, 110-foot (34 m) submarine chasers developed in 1917. The submarine chasers' range of about 900 miles (1,400 km) at a cruising speed of 10 knots (19 km/h; 12 mph) restricted their operations to off-shore anti-submarine work and denied them an open-ocean escort capability; their high consumption of gasoline and limited fuel storage were handicaps the Eagle class sought to remedy.

They were originally commissioned USS Eagle Boat No.1 (or 2,3..etc.) but this was changed to PE-1 (or 2,4.. etc.) in 1920. They never officially saw combat in World War I, but some were used during the Allied intervention in the Russian Civil War. PE-19, 27, 32, 38, 48 and 55–57 survived to be used in World War II.

Attention turned to building steel patrol vessels. In their construction, it was necessary to eliminate the established shipbuilding facilities as possible sources of construction as they were totally engaged in the building of destroyers, larger warships, and merchant shipping. Accordingly, a design was developed by the Bureau of Construction and Repair which was sufficiently simplified to permit speedy construction by less experienced shipyards.

== Involvement of Ford Motor Company ==
In June 1917, President Woodrow Wilson had summoned auto-builder Henry Ford to Washington in the hope of getting him to serve on the United States Shipping Board. Wilson felt that Ford, with his knowledge of mass production techniques, could immensely speed the building of ships in quantity. Apprised of the need for anti-submarine vessels to combat the U-boat menace, Ford replied, "what we want is one type of ship in large numbers."

On 7 November, Ford accepted membership on the Shipping Board and an active advisory role. Examining the Navy's plans for the projected steel patrol ships, Ford urged that all hull plates be flat so that they could be produced quickly in quantity and he also persuaded the Navy to accept steam turbines instead of reciprocating steam engines.

At this point, Secretary of the Navy Josephus Daniels was drawn into the project. He recognized that no facilities were available at the Navy yards for building new craft and asked Ford if he would undertake the task. Ford agreed, and, in January 1918, he was directed to proceed with the building of 100 of them. Later on, 12 more were added for delivery to the Italian government.

The first boat was launched on 11 July 1918. According to Ford, "They were built simply by applying our production principles to a new product."

== Construction ==
Ford's plan for building the ships was revolutionary. Establishing a new plant on the River Rouge on the outskirts of Detroit, he proposed to turn them out as factory products, using mass production techniques, and employing factory workers. He would then send the boats by the Great Lakes and the St. Lawrence River to the Atlantic coast. However, Ford had little part in the design of the boats. Except for his insistence upon simple plans and the use of steam turbines, he contributed little of a fundamental nature to the design concept.

First, Ford engineers built a full-scale pattern at the company's Highland Park facility, giving both the Ford team and the Naval officers an opportunity to correct flaws in the rough initial design and decide on the placement of all rivet holes in the craft, as well as allowing the carmaker's production experts the chance to compose specifications for the manufacturing and assembly processes.

The assembly plant was completed in five months, and the first keel was laid in May 1918. The machinery and fittings were largely built at Ford's Highland Park plant in Detroit, although the new River Rouge plant, given impetus by the war, saw a good deal of the steel sheets and other parts formed and fabricated there in the A-Building, or fabricating building. At first, Ford believed that boats could be sent down a continuously moving assembly line like automobiles. The size of the craft made this too difficult, however, and a "step-by-step" movement was instituted on the 1,700-foot (520 m) line, entailing seven separate assembly areas, followed by the addition of a 200-foot (61 m) extension to the assembly facility, or B-Building, to support a pre-assembly stage. Unfortunately, the Eagles suffered from various issues due to Ford's institutional inexperience with shipbuilding: for instance, the Model T did not use electric arc welding, and the resulting workmanship on the Eagle boats was so poor that the superintending constructor requested that Ford workers do as little welding as possible on water-tight and oil-tight bulkheads. Additionally, the use of ladders instead of scaffolds caused major difficulties—the attempted bolting of plates, carried out by workers wielding short-handled wrenches on ladders meant that the bolters were unable to apply sufficient force to bring the plates together tightly. Metal shavings between plates then made the riveters' task of pulling the plates together for a seal practically impossible.

The first Eagle boat was launched on 11 July. The launching of these 200-foot (61 m) craft was a formidable operation. Not built on slipways from which they could slide into the water, the hulls moved slowly from the assembly line on enormous, tractor-drawn flatcars. They were then placed on a 225-foot (69 m) steel trestle alongside the water's edge which could be sunk 20 feet (6.1 m) into the water by hydraulic action. The plan was to fit the Eagles out with all the basic equipment of a warship—turbines, weaponry, wiring, etc.--after launch, but this quickly became a choke point due to the cramped spaces on the boats themselves, and violated Ford's own mass production ethos.

The original expectation, set out in a contract between Ford and the Navy on 1 March 1918, was for delivery of 100 ships: "one by mid-July, ten by mid-August, twenty by mid-September, and twenty-five each month thereafter," or approximately one new Eagle boat completed each working day of the month. The first seven boats were not completed until the end of 1918, and succeeding boats were plagued by issues such as leaky fuel oil compartments. This state of affairs continued, even though the labor force reached 4,380 by July and later peaked at 8,000. The chief reasons were Ford's excessive initial optimism and the inexperience of labor and supervisory personnel in shipbuilding. Upon the signing of the Armistice in November 1918, the number under contract, previously raised from 100 to 112, was cut to 60. Of these, seven were commissioned in 1918, and the remaining 53 were commissioned in 1919.

The entire Eagle Boat operation came briefly under challenge by Senator Henry Cabot Lodge of Massachusetts in December 1918. At the ensuing Congressional hearings, Navy officials successfully defended the boats as being a necessary experiment and well made while Ford profits were proved to be modest. However, historian David Hounshell states that "the Eagle boat venture cannot be considered successful by the standards of the war era or the present," and today serves as a case study in the history of technology to illustrate the difficulty in transferring knowledge and techniques between superficially similar, but fundamentally different, fields of endeavor.

== U.S. service ==
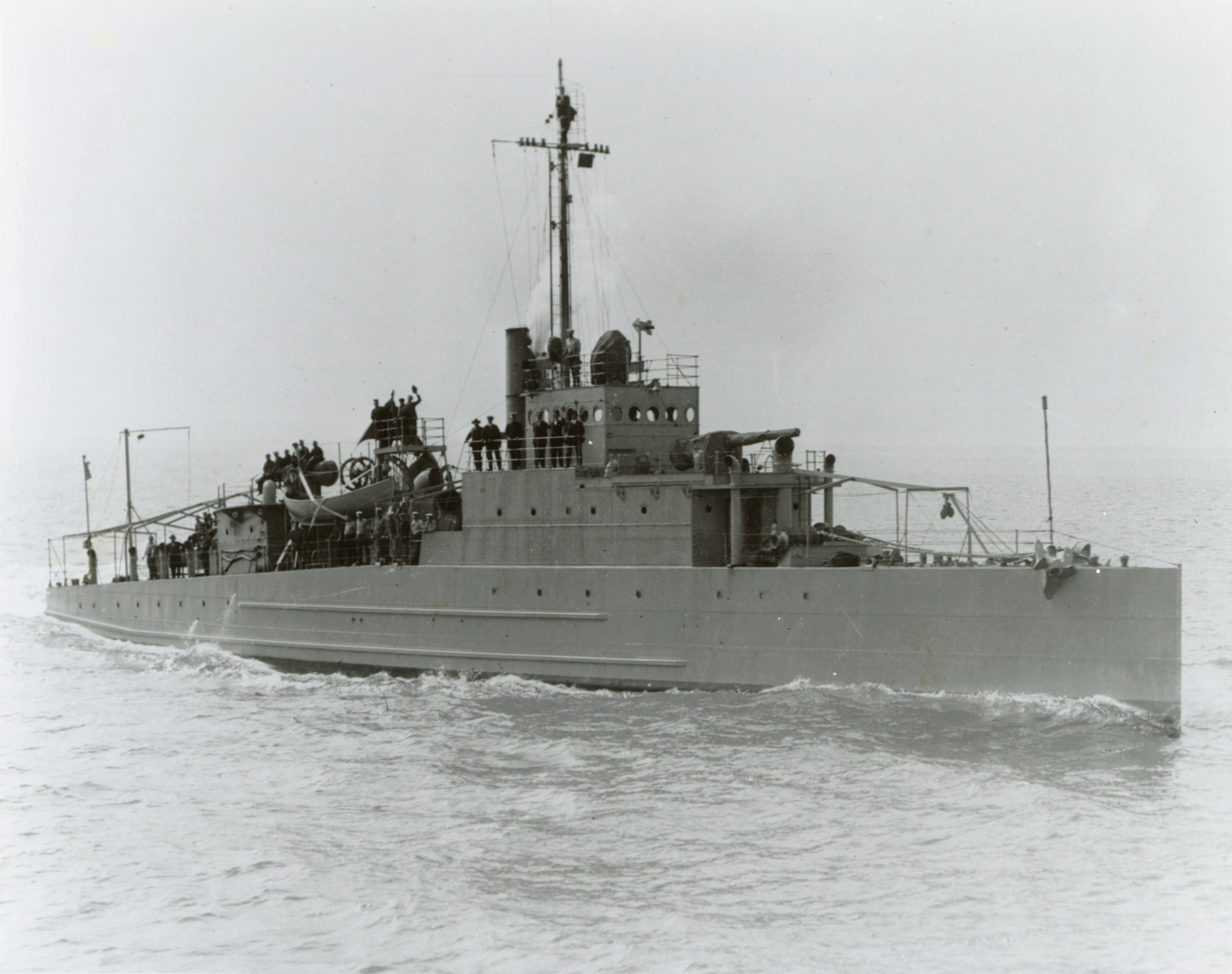
USS Eagle 2 (PE-2) on builder's trials in 1918.

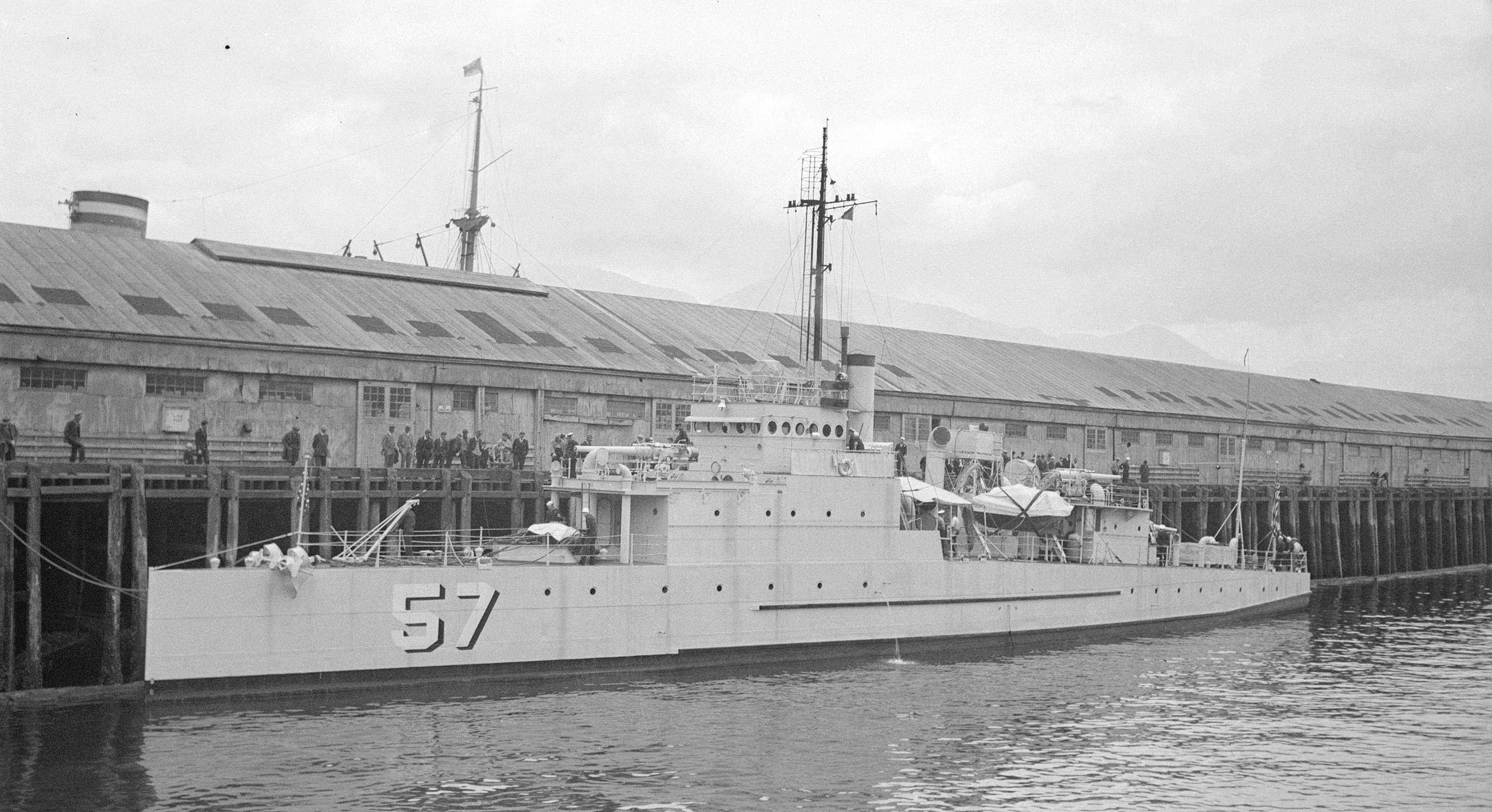
USS Eagle 57 (PE-57) in 1933.

The term "Eagle Boat" stemmed from a wartime editorial in The Washington Post which called for "...an eagle to scour the seas and pounce upon and destroy every German submarine." However, the Eagle Boats never saw service in World War I.

Reports on their performance at sea were mixed. The introduction, at Ford's insistence, of flanged plates instead of rolled plates facilitated production but resulted in sea-keeping characteristics which were far from ideal.

In the first years after the war, a number of them were used as aircraft tenders. Despite the handicap of their size, they serviced photographic reconnaissance planes at Midway in 1920 and in the Hawaiian Islands in 1921 before being supplanted by larger ships. Eagle boat 34, as related in Max Miller's 1932 book I Cover The Waterfront, shared the yearly duty alternately with the Navy tug USS Koka of capturing elephant seals on Mexico's Guadalupe Island for the San Diego Zoo.

Five of the Eagle Boats were transferred to the United States Coast Guard in 1919 but proved unsuitable for service because poor maneuvering characteristics and sea-keeping qualities. The balance were sold in the 1930s and early 1940s.

Eagle boat 33 served as the station ship at the Submarine Base in New London, Connecticut in the early 20s; Naval History and Heritage Command photo NH 54320 shows this vessel at New London flying an Admiral's flag.

Eight Eagle boats saw service during World War II. One was stationed in Miami as a training vessel., while one, Eagle 56, was sunk by a German submarine near Portland, Maine in April 1945. After the war, the seven remaining Eagle Boats were decommissioned.

== Ships ==
Designation	Keel Laid	Launched	Commissioned	Fate
PE-1	7 May 1918	11 July 1918	27 October 1918	Sold 11 June 1930
PE-2	10 May 1918	19 August 1918	11 July 1918	Sold 11 June 1930
PE-3	16 May 1918	11 September 1918	11 November 1918	Sold 11 June 1930
PE-4	21 May 1918	15 September 1918	14 November 1918	Sold 11 June 1930
PE-5	28 May 1918	28 September 1918	19 November 1918	Sold 11 June 1930
PE-6	3 June 1918	16 October 1918	21 November 1918	Expended as target 14 August 1934
PE-7	8 June 1918	5 October 1918	24 November 1918	Expended as target 14 August 1934
PE-8	10 June 1918	11 November 1918	31 October 1919	Sold 1 April 1931
PE-9	17 June 1918	8 November 1918	27 October 1919	Sold 26 May 1930
PE-10	6 July 1918	9 November 1918	31 October 1919	Destroyed 19 August 1937
PE-11	13 July 1918	14 November 1918	29 May 1919	Sold 16 January 1935
PE-12	13 July 1918	12 November 1918	6 November 1919	Sold 30 December 1935
PE-13	15 July 1918	9 January 1919	2 April 1919	Sold 26 May 1930
PE-14	20 July 1918	23 January 1919	17 June 1919	Expended as target 22 November 1934
PE-15	21 July 1918	25 January 1919	11 June 1919	Sold 14 June 1934
PE-16	22 July 1918	11 January 1919	5 June 1919	Transferred to USCG 19 December 1919 as McGourty
PE-17	3 August 1918	1 February 1919	3 July 1919	Wrecked off Long Island, New York 22 May 1922
PE-18	5 August 1918	10 February 1919	7 August 1919	Sold 11 June 1930
PE-19	6 August 1918	30 January 1919	25 June 1919	In service during WWII; Destroyed 6 August 1946
PE-20	26 August 1918	15 February 1919	28 July 1919	Transferred to USCG 26 November 1919 as Scally
PE-21	31 August 1918	15 February 1919	31 July 1919	Transferred to USCG 19 December 1919 as Bothwell
PE-22	5 September 1918	10 February 1919	17 July 1919	Transferred to USCG 19 December 1919 as Earp
PE-23	11 September 1918	20 February 1919	19 June 1919	Sold 11 June 1930
PE-24	13 September 1918	24 February 1919	12 July 1919	Sold 11 June 1930
PE-25	17 September 1918	19 February 1919	30 June 1919	Capsized in Delaware Bay squall 11 June 1920
PE-26	25 September 1918	1 March 1919	1 October 1919	Sold 29 August 1938
PE-27	22 October 1918	1 March 1919	14 July 1919	In service during WWII; Sold 4 June 1946
PE-28	23 October 1918	1 March 1919	28 July 1919	Sold 11 June 1930
PE-29	18 November 1918	8 March 1919	20 August 1919	Sold 11 June 1930
PE-30	19 November 1918	8 March 1919	14 August 1919	Transferred to USCG 19 December 1919 as Carr
PE-31	19 November 1918	8 March 1919	14 August 1919	Sold 18 May 1923
PE-32	30 November 1918	15 March 1919	4 September 1919	In service during WWII; Sold 3 March 1947
PE-33	14 February 1918	15 March 1919	4 September 1919	Sold 11 June 1930
PE-34	8 January 1919	15 March 1919	3 September 1919	Sold 9 June 1932
PE-35	13 January 1919	22 March 1919	22 August 1919	Sold 7 June 1938
PE-36	22 January 1919	22 March 1919	20 August 1919	Sold 27 February 1936
PE-37	27 January 1919	25 March 1919	30 September 1919	Sold 11 June 1930
PE-38	30 January 1919	29 March 1919	30 July 1919	In service during WWII; Sold 3 March 1947
PE-39	3 February 1919	29 March 1919	20 September 1919	Sold 7 June 1938
PE-40	7 February 1919	5 April 1919	1 October 1919	Expended as target 19 November 1934
PE-41	20 February 1919	5 April 1919	26 September 1919	Sold 11 June 1930
PE-42	13 February 1919	17 May 1919	3 October 1919	Sold 11 June 1930
PE-43	17 February 1919	17 May 1919	2 October 1919	Sold 26 May 1930
PE-44	20 February 1919	24 May 1919	30 September 1919	Disposed of 14 May 1938
PE-45	20 February 1919	17 May 1919	2 October 1919	Sold 11 June 1930
PE-46	24 February 1919	24 May 1919	3 October 1919	Sold 10 December 1936
PE-47	3 March 1919	19 June 1919	4 October 1919	Sold 30 December 1935
PE-48	3 March 1919	24 May 1919	8 October 1919	In service during WWII; Sold 10 October 1946
PE-49	4 March 1919	14 June 1919	10 October 1919	Sold 20 September 1930
PE-50	10 March 1919	18 July 1919	6 October 1919	Sold 11 June 1930
PE-51	10 March 1919	14 June 1919	2 October 1919	Sold 29 August 1938
PE-52	10 March 1919	9 July 1919	10 October 1919	Sold 29 August 1938
PE-53	17 March 1919	13 August 1919	20 October 1919	Sold 26 August 1938
PE-54	17 March 1919	17 July 1919	10 October 1919	Sold 26 May 1930
PE-55	17 March 1919	22 July 1919	10 October 1919	In service during WWII; Sold 3 March 1947
PE-56	25 March 1919	15 August 1919	26 October 1919	In service during WWII; Torpedoed by U-853 off Portland, Maine, on 23 April 1945
PE-57	25 March 1919	29 July 1919	15 October 1919	In service during WWII; Sold 5 March 1947
PE-58	25 March 1919	2 August 1919	20 October 1919	Disposed of 30 June 1940
PE-59	31 March 1919	12 April 1919	19 September 1919	Sold 29 August 1938
PE-60	31 March 1919	13 August 1919	27 October 1919	Sold 29 August 1938

PE-61 through PE-112 were canceled on 30 November 1918. PE-5, PE-15, PE-25, PE-45, PE-65, PE-75, PE-86, PE-95, PE-105, and PE-112 were allotted for transfer to Italy, though this plan was cancelled and none were ever delivered.

== See also ==
- Patrol boat
- List of patrol vessels of the United States Navy
