= USS Napa (AT-32) =

Tugboat of the United States Navy

History

United States
- Name: USS Napa
- Laid down: 5 March 1919
- Launched: 24 July 1919
- Commissioned: 5 December 1919
- Decommissioned: 7 June 1929
- Recommissioned: 15 August 1939
- Honors and awards: 1 battle star (World War II)
- Fate: Scuttled by her crew off Corregidor Island, Philippine Islands, 9 April 1942

General characteristics
- Type: Bagaduce-class fleet tug
- Displacement: 845 long tons (859 t)
- Length: 156 ft 8 in (47.75 m)
- Beam: 30 ft (9.1 m)
- Draft: 14 ft 7 in (4.45 m)
- Propulsion: Diesel engine, single propeller
- Speed: 13 knots (24 km/h; 15 mph)
- Complement: 44 officers and enlisted
- Armament: 2 × 3"/50 caliber guns; 1 × Lewis machine gun

USS Napa (AT-32), originally Yucca, was a Bagaduce-class fleet tug of the United States Navy. The ship was laid down as Napa on 5 March 1919, at the Puget Sound Naval Shipyard, Washington; launched on 24 July 1919; and commissioned on 5 December 1919.

== Service history ==
=== 1919–1929 ===
Following shakedown and an abbreviated tour on the West Coast, the oceangoing tug sailed to Guam, where she served as a station ship from June 1919 until the spring of 1929. She then steamed to the Philippines, where she decommissioned on 7 June 1929, and joined the Inactive Fleet, berthed at Olongapo.

=== World War II, 1939–1942 ===
Ordered reactivated as war in Asia loomed closer, Napa recommissioned at Cavite on 15 August 1939, joined the Asiatic Fleet and for the next two years performed the services demanded of her type.

In late 1941, when the possibility of war became a probability for the near future, the under-shipped and undermanned fleet assigned to defend and support the Philippines began to improve its defenses. Napa, under the command of Lt. Lieutenant Minter Dial (USNA, 1932), was assigned to net laying and maintenance activities in Mariveles and Manila Bays. Without previous training or experience and without the proper equipment, the crew of 40 men (down from the 60 men the ship was originally designed to hold in active duty), including 8 Filipinos, on the Napa, aided by 16th Naval District service craft, and, at times, by various available minesweepers, gunboats, and Army craft, improvised with what they had.

Between 8 October and 8 December they worked to install anti-torpedo nets across the entrance to Mariveles Bay. Continuing on after losing what little remained of their equipment during the Japanese air raid on Cavite on 10 December, they kept up the work, completing 95% of the job by 14 December when they were ordered to cease operations. On 17 and 18 December, they moved two unsunk sections of the net to Manila, and then, on 19 December, reported for duty under Commander, Inshore Patrol, 16th Naval District. From that time until 9 April 1942, Napa, operating from Mariveles, performed various duties which included net tending, salvage, towing and patrol assignments in the Bataan Manila Bay area. Having re-equipped the gun deck with a 50-caliber Lewis machine gun mounted between the two 3-inch guns, the Napa was intermittently involved in direct enemy combat and, according to Chief Petty Office William "Gunner" Wells (Retired Commander), had ten confirmed kills and four probables to its credit.

Napa was responsible for laying down 13,000 mines during its activity in the Philippines. The Napa was the final US ship in Cavite Bay to pick up fuel and, as a result, was the last ship to be operational. It had no reported casualties from Japanese air attacks. Dial would later be awarded the Navy Cross for these activities.

On 18 March 1942 Ensign Perroneau B. Wingo was put in charge of the Napa, while Lt. Dial was appointed Secretary to Captain Kenneth Hoeffel, the senior naval officer present on Corregidor.

=== Destruction, April 1942 ===
On 8 April the decision was made to evacuate Bataan. At about 0130 on 8 April, the sinking of Napa was ordered. Most of the crew, with provisions, personal belongings and small arms, were transported via small boats to Corregidor Island. Napa was then towed 500 yards out from the beach. The skeleton crew opened the magazine flood valves and made three openings through the hull in the fire and engine room. At 0500 Napa was abandoned. The CO, Ensign P. B. Wingo, and the remaining crew members proceeded to Corregidor. From that island they watched their ship remain afloat throughout the day and then, after nightfall, sink into the bay. Ensign Peronneau Wingo was awarded the Navy Cross for his actions between 18 March 1942 and 9 April 1942.

The crew of the Napa then joined the crews of other similarly fated ships. Taking up small arms, they were incorporated into the 4th Marine Regiment, in which they helped man the beach defenses until Corregidor fell on 6 May 1942. Some died on Corregidor and others died in Japanese captivity, including P.B. Wingo, and former captain Minter Dial. Napa was awarded one battle star for her service in World War II.
