= USS Uranus =

Cargo ship of the United States Navy

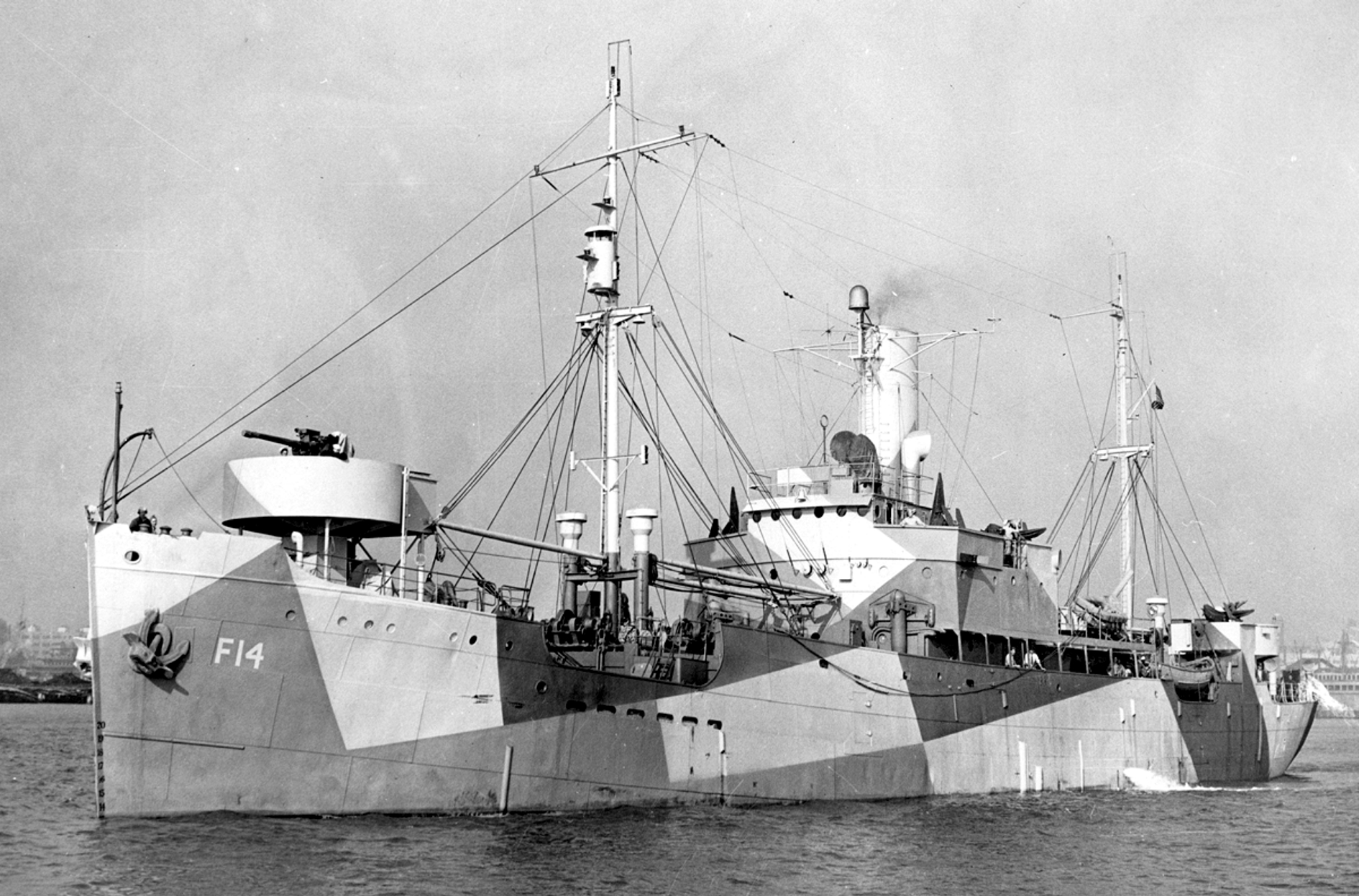
- USS Uranus (AF-14) 1944

History

United States
- Name: Helga (1933–1938); Caravelle (1938–1940); Maria (1940–1941); Uranus (1941–1946); Maria Dan (1946–1959); Michael (1959–1968)
- Owner: J. Lauritzen A/S (1933–1941); U.S. Maritime Commission (1941–1946); J. Lauritzen A/S (1946–1959); Chrisot M. Sarlis (1959–1968)
- Operator: J. Lauritzen A/S (1933–1941); U.S. Navy (bareboat charter from War Shipping Administration) (1941–1946); J. Lauritzen A/S (1946–1959); Chrisot M. Sarlis (1959–1968)
- Builder: Helsingør Jernskibs og Maskinbyggeri
- Launched: 21 December 1932
- Acquired: by Navy 11 August 1941
- Commissioned: Uranus (AF-14) 27 October 1941
- Decommissioned: by navy 8 May 1946, returned to owner 16 May 1946
- Stricken: by Navy 21 May 1946
- Identification: IMO number: 5233834
- Fate: Scrapped 1968, Sveti Kajo, Croatia
- Notes: Ship in commercial and naval service 1933–1968.

General characteristics
- Tonnage: 1,507 GRT, 2,255 DWT
- Displacement: 3,348 t.(fl)
- Length: 269 ft 6 in (82.14 m)
- Beam: 39 ft 6 in (12.04 m)
- Draft: 16 ft (4.9 m)
- Propulsion: Reciprocating steam engine, single propeller
- Speed: 12 knots (22 km/h; 14 mph)
- Capacity: 119,500 cubic feet (3,384 m^{3}) (Bale)
- Complement: (Navy) 93
- Armament: 2 × single 3 in (76 mm) DP gun mounts; 6 × single 20 mm AA gun mounts

USS Uranus (AF-14) was a Uranus-class stores ship bareboat chartered to the U.S. Navy by the War Shipping Administration for use in World War II. The ship was one of the Danish vessels idled in U.S. ports seized by the United States after the occupation of Denmark by German forces. The ship was the Danish J. Lauritzen A/S line vessel Maria, ex Caravelle, ex Helga until chartered to the Navy and commissioned on 11 August 1941 under the name Uranus. (Note: Dictionary of American Naval Fighting Ships (DANFS) erroneously has the name as Marie. The name is Maria in all other references, including Maritime Administration records. After return to Danish registry Maria became Maria Dan 1946 under a new Danish naming system after return to Denmark.)

Uranus served in both the North Atlantic Ocean and the Pacific Ocean, delivering food, including refrigerated items, to ships operating in the battle areas.

The ship was returned to Denmark and later, under new Danish naming rules, named Maria Dan until sold to Greece to be renamed Michael in 1959. The ship was scrapped in 1968.

== Commercial service ==
Uranus (AF-14) was launched 21 December 1932 as the steamship Helga at Helsingør (Elsinore), near Copenhagen, Denmark, by Helsingør Jernskibs og Maskinbyggeri for the shipping company J. Lauritzen A/S and had previously operated as Caravelle (1938 to 1940) and Maria, IMO 5233834 (1940 to 1941). Maritime Administration records show the ship as being 1,507 GRT and 2,255 DWT with a Bale Capacity of 119,500 cubic feet (3,384 m^{3}). The refrigerated ship served in the fruit trade between Denmark and Central American republics.

After Germany occupied Denmark on 9 April 1940 inactive ships of Axis or Axis occupied countries in U.S. ports were seized under an Executive Order. Maria was one of the Danish vessels seized by the United States Maritime Commission and delivered to the War Shipping Administration (WSA) on 2 August 1941. WSA allocated the ship to the Navy under a bareboat charter agreement on 11 August 1941.

== Navy service ==
Maria was converted to a naval stores ship by Robbins Drydock Co. yard at Brooklyn, New York. Renamed Uranus and classified AF-14, the ship was placed in commission at Brooklyn on 27 October 1941. During the ship's subsequent shakedown period, the Japanese attacked Pearl Harbor; and the United States entered World War II in both oceans. Uranus departed Norfolk, Virginia, on 20 December and arrived at Halifax, Nova Scotia, on Christmas Eve. Five days later, she pushed on for Iceland.

Uranus served as a floating refrigerated storage vessel and provided stores and provisions to American forces in Iceland into the summer of 1943. During this time, her ports of call included Hvalfjörður, Búðareyri, Seyðisfjörður, Reykjavík, and Akureyri. In these inhospitable and unpredictable northern waters, the ship ran aground off Akureyri while on a coastwise passage at 0129 on 10 April 1943, coming to a stop on a sloping gravel beach which was reputedly once the fairway between two holes of a coastal golf course. After repeated attempts, with the assistance of USS Symbol and USS Kewaydin, the storeship was finally refloated on the 13th.

Following repairs, she departed Icelandic waters on 21 August, with men and equipment from a Navy construction battalion on board but, due to contrary winds and currents, did not make port at her Davisville, Rhode Island, destination until 3 September. After discharging passengers, the stores ship proceeded on for New York, arriving three days later. She then pressed south for Norfolk, Virginia, where she soon commenced a lengthy overhaul. Uranus—now outfitted with a new refrigeration system—departed the U.S. East Coast on 20 December and, five days later, reached a rendezvous with a convoy bound for the Pacific Ocean. Clearing the Panama Canal on the first day of 1944, the stores ship headed on for Pearl Harbor on 3 January, proceeding independently, and reached Oahu on the 23d.

She conducted two round-trip Pacific passages between San Francisco, California, and Pearl Harbor and Midway Island, before she sailed for Majuro in the Marshalls. For the remainder of the year 1944, Uranus conducted routine cargo and stores-carrying runs between Midway Island and Pearl Harbor to the west and San Pedro, California, to the east. Overhauled at San Francisco, California, in April 1945, the ship was based at this port for the remainder of the war in the Pacific. She subsequently participated in Operation Magic Carpet operations to bring veterans back to the United States from the erstwhile Pacific battle zones.

Decommissioned on 8 May 1946 at Norfolk, Uranus was delivered to the War Shipping Administration of the Maritime Commission on 9 May and was struck from the Navy list on 21 May.

== Return to commercial service ==
The ship was returned to the Danish government and to her original owner, J. Lauritzen 16 May 1946, re-flagged Danish, registered at Esbjerg, Denmark as Maria Dan modified to carry twelve cadets operating as a school ship in use until 1959. Maria Dan was converted from a school ship and sold in 1959 to Chrisot M. Sarlis, Piræus, Greece and renamed Michael. In 1968, after an engine room fire and declaration as a constructive total loss, the ship was sold for scrap and scrapped at Sveti Kajo, Croatia.
