= USS Jacob Jones (DD-130) =

Wickes-class destroyer

Coordinates: 38°37′N 74°32′W

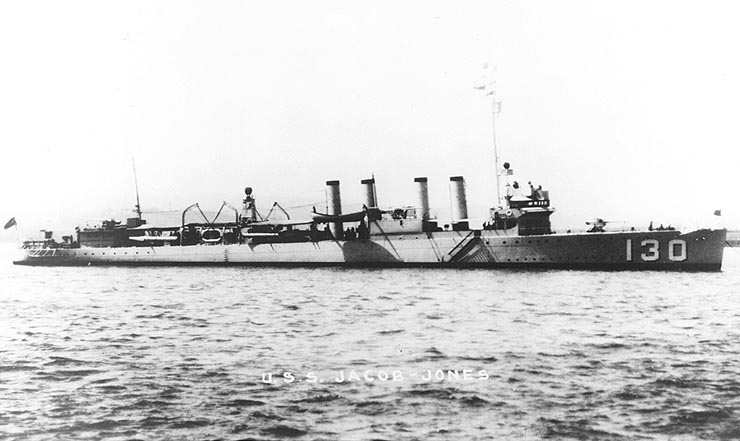
- USS Jacob Jones in the 1930s

History

United States
- Name: Jacob Jones
- Namesake: Jacob Jones
- Builder: New York Shipbuilding Corporation, Camden, New Jersey
- Laid down: 21 February 1918
- Launched: 20 November 1918
- Commissioned: 20 October 1919
- Decommissioned: 24 June 1922
- Recommissioned: 1 May 1930
- Fate: Torpedoed and sunk, 28 February 1942

General characteristics
- Class & type: Wickes-class destroyer
- Displacement: 1,090 tons
- Length: 314 ft 5 in (95.8 m)
- Beam: 31 ft 8 in (9.7 m)
- Draft: 8 ft 8 in (2.6 m)
- Speed: 35 knots (65 km/h)
- Complement: 113 officers and enlisted
- Armament: 4 × 4 in (102 mm)/50 guns, 2 × 3 in (76 mm)/23 guns; 12 × 21 in (533 mm) torpedo tubes.

USS Jacob Jones (DD-130), named for Commodore Jacob Jones USN (1768–1850), was a Wickes-class destroyer. She was sunk by a German submarine in 1942 during World War II.

== Construction and commissioning ==
Jacob Jones was laid down by the New York Shipbuilding Corporation at Camden, New Jersey on 21 February 1918, launched on 20 November 1918, sponsored by Mrs. Cazenove Doughton, great-granddaughter of Commodore Jones, and commissioned on 20 October 1919.

== Service history ==
Jacob Jones was decommissioned on 24 June 1922 and placed in reserve until recommissioned on 1 May 1930, and was assigned to Neutrality Patrol duties out of Charleston, South Carolina on 4 April 1940.

=== Inter-war period ===
After fitting out at Philadelphia, Jacob Jones sailed 4 December for shakedown in the Atlantic Ocean. She arrived at Pensacola, Florida on 22 December to continue her training and departed on 3 January 1920 for the Pacific Ocean. Arriving at San Diego on 26 January, she operated along the California coast on anti-aircraft and firing exercises. She entered Mare Island Navy Yard 17 August for repairs and overhaul and assumed a reserve status. Returning to duty with Destroyer Force, Pacific Fleet, 18 June 1921, she operated out of San Diego until decommissioning 24 June 1922.

Recommissioned 1 May 1930, Jacob Jones trained in coastal waters from Alaska to Mexico as a plane guard for the Navy's budding aircraft carriers. Following Battle Fleet maneuvers during August, she entered Mare Island in November for repairs. The destroyer sailed 4 February 1931 for Panama, where she resumed plane guard duty for Langley. Jacob Jones transited the Panama Canal on 22 March, and sailed for maneuvers in the Caribbean Sea. She sailed for the United States on 1 May and took part in joint Army-Navy maneuvers in the Chesapeake Bay 26 to 29 May. During the remainder of the summer, she operated with Destroyer Division 7 along the New England coast before retiring to the Boston Navy Yard 2 October for overhaul.

Jacob Jones steamed from Boston on 1 December for maneuvers off Haiti. On 13 February 1932 she departed the Caribbean to begin 13 months of plane guard duty and torpedo practice along the California coast. She returned to Guantanamo Bay Naval Base, Cuba on 1 May 1933 for general drill and battle problem exercises, and on 26 May she sailed for Norfolk, Virginia to undergo self-upkeep on rotating reserve.

Following two months of overhaul at Charleston, Jones returned to Guantanamo on 29 November for scouting and firing exercises. She interrupted her maneuvers on 29 June 1934, and sailed for Port-au-Prince, Haiti, where she served as an escort during President Franklin D. Roosevelt's "Good Neighbor" visit to Haiti. She resumed Caribbean operations in July and participated in landing force exercises at Guantanamo Bay during September. She retired from the Caribbean late in November and entered Norfolk Navy Yard 3 December 1934 for several months of upkeep.

In May 1935, Jacob Jones embarked midshipmen from the Naval Academy for an Atlantic training cruise. She returned to Norfolk 7 June for three months of coastal patrols and maneuvers. She steamed to New York in September to participate in destroyer maneuvers and operated out of New York until entering Brooklyn Navy Yard in January 1936 for upkeep and inspection.

On 15 June 1936, the destroyer departed New York with reserve officers on board for training cruises in the Caribbean which continued through September. In October, she participated in joint Army-Navy coastal maneuvers; and, following her annual inspection at Norfolk, she participated in minesweeping training during February 1937. In March, she trained officers of the 5th Fleet Reserve and in June she resumed training cruises for midshipmen. She continued to operate as a practice ship for reserve officers until 15 January 1938, when she departed Norfolk for fleet landing exercises and battle maneuvers in waters off Puerto Rico and the Virgin Islands. Jacob Jones returned to Norfolk on 13 March for overhaul. In June she resumed operations out of Norfolk, serving as a carrier plane guard and conducting torpedo and gunnery practice.

After attending the Presidential Regatta in September, Jacob Jones prepared to sail for Europe to join Squadron 40-T in the Mediterranean Sea. Organized in September 1936 to protect and evacuate Americans from Spain during the civil war, the squadron remained in the western Mediterranean. Departing Norfolk 26 October, Jacob Jones reached Gibraltar on 6 November, and arrived Villefranche on 17 November. She operated out of that French Mediterranean port on patrol until 20 March 1939. She visited Algiers from 24 to 25 March 1939 and, during the next seven months, steamed to various Atlantic European ports from Rotterdam to Lisbon. Departing Lisbon on 4 October, she sailed for the United States and anchored at Norfolk on 14 October.

Resuming her coastal operations, Jacob Jones conducted plane screening patrols from Norfolk to Newport, Rhode Island and in December she escorted the submarine Seadragon during its Caribbean shakedown.

=== World War II ===
After two months of upkeep and inspection at Norfolk, Jacob Jones sailed for Charleston on 4 April 1940 to join the Neutrality Patrol. Organized in September 1939 as a response to the war in Europe, the Neutrality Patrol was ordered to track and report the movements of any warlike operations of belligerents in the waters of the Western Hemisphere. The basic purpose of the patrol "was to emphasize the readiness of the United States Navy to defend the Western Hemisphere." In June, after two months of duty with the Neutrality Patrol, Jacob Jones returned to training midshipmen.

In September, Jacob Jones departed Norfolk for New London, Connecticut, where her crew underwent intensive ASW sound school training. Returning briefly to Norfolk on 6 December, she sailed to Key West for further anti-submarine warfare (ASW) training. She resumed her operations with the Neutrality Patrol in March 1941, patrolling the waters from Key West to Yucatán Channel. In May, she joined the ships which guarded the waters of Vichy-controlled islands, Martinique and Guadeloupe in the Lesser Antilles. Jacob Jones maintained her Caribbean operations throughout the summer.

On 30 September 1941, she departed Guantanamo with Destroyer Division 54 to prepare for escort duty in the North Atlantic. Jones received two months of upkeep and inspection at Norfolk and on 1 December 1941, departed for convoy escort training along the New England coast. Clearing Boston Harbor on 12 December, she sailed to Naval Station Argentia, Newfoundland, to begin her escort duty. On 16 December she escorted the submarines Mackerel and S-33 through heavy seas to Boston and returned to Argentia on 24 December. Jacob Jones once again departed Argentia on 4 January 1942 escorting Albatross and Linnet. While steaming to join Convoy SC 63, bound for the British Isles, the destroyer made an underwater contact and commenced a depth charge attack. Losing contact with the submarine, she escorted her ships to the convoy and returned to Argentia on 5 January.

Sailing from Argentia on 14 January 1942, Jacob Jones joined Convoy HX 169, which was headed for Iceland. The convoy encountered a violent storm; heavy seas and winds of force 9 scattered its ships' convoy. Separated from the convoy, the destroyer steamed independently for Hvalfjörður, Iceland. Though hampered by a shortage of fuel, an inoperable gyro compass, an erratic magnetic compass, and the continuous pounding of the storm, Jacob Jones arrived on 19 January. Five days later, she escorted three merchant ships to Argentia. Once again heavy seas and fierce winds separated the ships, and Jacob Jones continued toward Argentia with one Norwegian merchantman. She detected and attacked another submarine on 2 February 1942, but her depth charges yielded no visible results.

Arriving at Argentia on 3 February, she departed the following day and rejoined Convoy ON 59, bound for Boston. Reaching Boston on 8 February, Jacob Jones received a week of repairs. She sailed on 15 February for Norfolk and three days later steamed from Norfolk to New York.

In an effort to stem the losses to Allied merchant shipping along the Atlantic coast, Vice Admiral Adolphus Andrews, Commander of the Eastern Sea Frontier, established a roving ASW patrol. Jacob Jones, Lieutenant Commander Hugh Black in command, departed New York on 22 February for this duty. While passing the swept channel off Lightship Ambrose, Jones made a possible submarine contact and attacked immediately. For five hours, Jones ran twelve attack patterns, dropping some 57 depth charges. Oil slicks appeared during the last six attacks, but no other debris was detected. Having expended all her charges, Jones returned to New York to rearm. Subsequent investigation failed to reveal any conclusive evidence of a sunken submarine.

=== Fate ===
On the morning of 27 February 1942, Jacob Jones departed New York harbor and steamed southward along the New Jersey coast to patrol and search the area between Barnegat Light and Five Fathom Bank. Shortly after her departure, she received orders to concentrate her patrol activity in waters off Cape May and the Delaware Capes. At 1530 she spotted the burning wreckage of tanker R. P. Resor, torpedoed the previous day east of Barnegat Light; Jacob Jones circled the ship for two hours searching for survivors before resuming her southward course. Cruising at 15 knots (28 km/h) through calm seas, she last reported her position at 2000 and then commenced radio silence. A full moon lit the night sky and visibility was good; throughout the night the ship, completely darkened without running or navigation lights showing, kept her southward course.

At the first light of dawn 28 February 1942, the undetected German submarine U-578 fired a spread of torpedoes at the unsuspecting destroyer. The torpedoes were not detected and two or three struck the destroyer's port side in rapid succession.

According to her survivors, the first torpedo struck just aft of the bridge and caused major damage. Apparently, it exploded the ship's magazine; the resulting blast sheared off everything forward of the point of impact, destroying completely the bridge, the chart room, and the officers' and petty officers' quarters. As she stopped dead in the water, unable to signal a distress message, a second torpedo struck about 40 feet (12 m) forward of the fantail and carried away the after part of the ship above the keel plates and shafts and destroyed the after crew's quarters. Only the midships section was left intact.

All but 25 or 30 officers and men, including Lieutenant Commander Black, were killed by the explosions. The survivors, including a badly wounded, "practically incoherent" signal officer, went for the lifeboats. Oily decks, fouled lines and rigging, and the clutter of the ship's strewn twisted wreckage hampered their efforts to launch the boats. Jacob Jones remained afloat for about 45 minutes, allowing her survivors to clear the stricken ship in four or five rafts. Within an hour of the initial explosion Jacob Jones plunged bow first into the Atlantic; as her shattered stern disappeared, her depth charges exploded, killing several survivors on a nearby raft (as had happened to the previous Jacob Jones in 1917).

At 0810, an Army observation plane sighted the liferafts and reported their position to Eagle 56 of the Inshore Patrol. By 1100, when strong winds and rising seas forced her to abandon her search, she had rescued 12 survivors, one of whom died en route to Cape May. The search for the other survivors of Jacob Jones continued by plane and ship for the next two days, but none were ever found.
