= USS Kewaydin (AT-24) =

Tugboat of the United States Navy

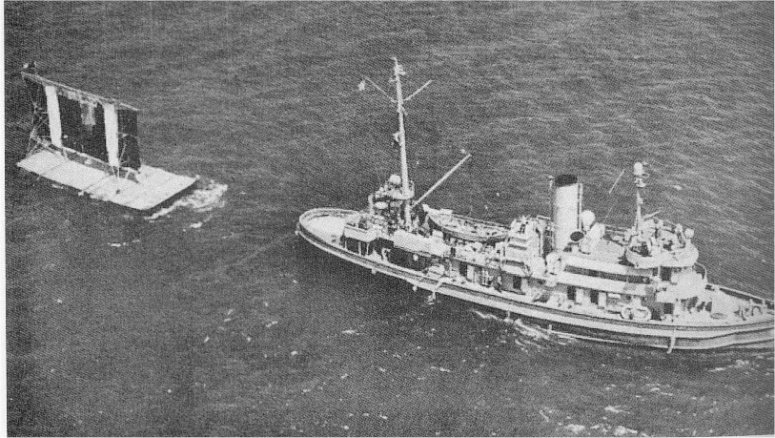

History

United States
- Laid down: date unknown
- Launched: 25 June 1919
- Commissioned: 4 November 1919
- Decommissioned: 10 December 1945
- Stricken: date unknown
- Fate: Most likely scrapped

General characteristics
- Displacement: 751 t.(lt) 1,000 t.(fl)
- Length: 156 ft 8 in (47.75 m)
- Beam: 30 ft (9.1 m)
- Draft: 14 ft 7 in (4.45 m)
- Propulsion: Triple expansion steam
- Speed: 12.4 kts
- Complement: 35
- Armament: two 3 in (76 mm), two machine guns

USS Kewaydin (AT-24) was an Bagaduce-class fleet tug laid down for the U.S. Navy in the closing days of World War I and continued in operation throughout World War II.

Kewaydin (AT-24) was launched 25 June 1919 by Ferguson Steel & Iron Co., Buffalo, New York; accepted by the Navy 31 October, and commissioned as USS Kewaydin (Fleet Tug No. 24), 4 November 1919. She was redesignated Fleet Tug (AT-24), 17 July 1920, and on 14 May 1944, she was reclassified Fleet Tug Old, (ATO-24).

== Post-World War I operations ==
Assigned to the 5th Naval District, Kewaydin arrived Norfolk, Virginia, 19 June 1920. For more than 22 years she operated out of Norfolk from Boston, Massachusetts, to Charleston, South Carolina, towing ships and targets and performing yard, harbor, and salvage duty.

== World War II North Atlantic operations ==
She departed New York 16 November 1942 with an Iceland-bound convoy and was damaged while steaming through heavy seas 19–27 November After repairs at St. John's, Newfoundland, she arrived Hvalfjörður, Iceland, 22 December. Assigned to the Naval Operating Base, she towed gasoline barges, provided harbor tug services, and assisted in salvage operations. On 13 April 1943 she assisted in freeing USS Uranus, grounded off Akureyri along the northern coast of Iceland.

== Coastal rescue operations ==
Kewaydin departed Reykjavík 19 April for Argentia, Newfoundland, where she arrived 28 April for duty as harbor tug and target-towing ship for Task Force 22. She served at Argentia until she sailed 2 June for Norfolk, arriving on the 7th. Resuming duty out of Norfolk, Kewaydin towed antisubmarine and surface targets in Chesapeake Bay and steamed from Maine to South Carolina on towing and salvage duty. While steaming off Cape Henry 17 and 18 November, she helped to free grounded USS Melville; and during towing operations along the New England coast 11 to 13 December, she searched for SS Suffolk, disabled in heavy seas.

== Sailing the Atlantic for England ==
Departing Charleston, South Carolina, 25 January 1944, Kewaydin steamed in convoy via Bermuda and the Azores for England. She reached Falmouth, England on 13 March, and for more than 2 months she made towing runs along the southern coast of England from Falmouth to the River Thames.

== Supporting the Normandy invasion ==
Reclassified as ATO-24 on 13 April, Kewaydin joined in the Normandy Invasion. Departing Selsey, England, 8 June, she towed lightship AL-28 to Utah Beach at St. Laurent, France. Between 8 June and 14 January 1945 she made 22 English Channel crossings. Although harassed by unfavorable weather and German V-1 robot-bombs, she towed barges and landing craft from Lee-on-Solent, Falmouth, Plymouth, Portland, and other English ports to St. Laurent, Arromanches, Cherbourg, and Calais, France. While anchored at Dungeness, England on 29 June, she was slightly damaged by a V-1 robot-bomb that exploded close aboard after being shot down by British fighters.

== End-of-war operations ==
Kewaydin continued operating along the English coast until she departed Plymouth, England, 16 March 1945 for the United States. Steaming via Belfast, Northern Ireland, she reached Cape Cod, Massachusetts on 12 April and arrived Norfolk 22 April. After a complete overhaul, she sailed 16 June with YR-31 in tow. Steaming via Bermuda, Cuba, and the Panama Canal, she reached San Diego, California on 31 July as the Navy's final blows against Japan brought the war in the Pacific to a close. Kewaydin decommissioned at San Diego 10 December and was transferred to the Maritime Commission. She was sold to Bay Cities Transportation Co., San Francisco, California, 23 December.

== Military awards and honors ==
Kewaydin received one battle star for World War II service. Her crew members were authorized the following medals:

- American Defense Medal (with Fleet clasp)
- American Campaign Medal
- European-African-Middle Eastern Campaign Medal (1)
- World War II Victory Medal
