= USS Eagle 56 =

US Navy Eagle-class patrol boat

Coordinates: 43.5577°N 70.1621°W

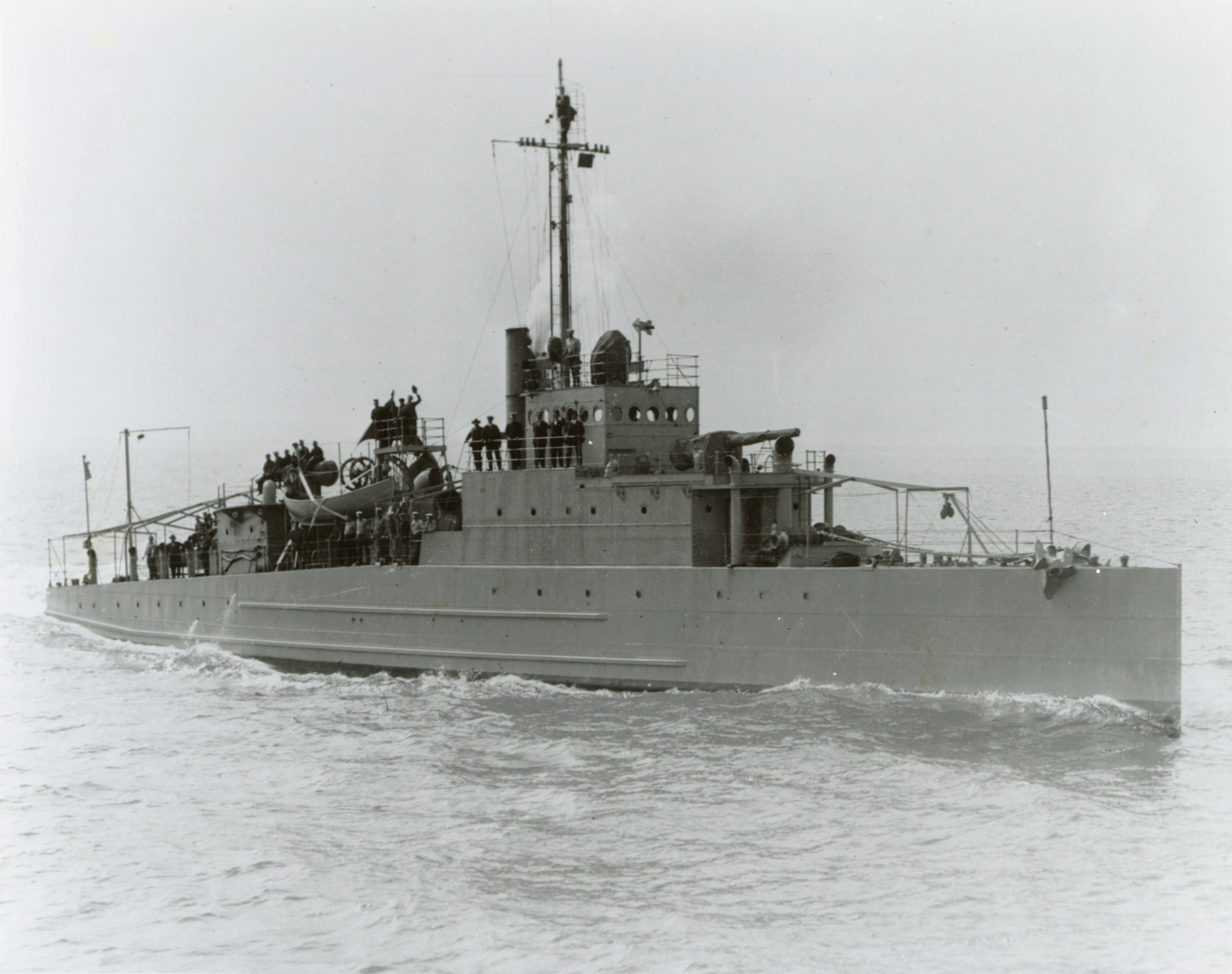
- USS Eagle 2, an identical sister ship of Eagle 56

History

United States
- Name: Eagle 56
- Builder: Ford Motor Company
- Laid down: 25 March 1919
- Launched: 15 August 1919
- Commissioned: 26 October 1919
- Fate: Torpedoed, 23 April 1945

General characteristics
- Class & type: Eagle-class patrol craft
- Displacement: 615 long tons (625 t)
- Length: 200 ft 9 in (61.19 m)
- Beam: 33 ft 1 in (10.08 m)
- Draft: 8 ft 6 in (2.59 m)
- Speed: 18.32 kn (21.08 mph; 33.93 km/h)
- Complement: Officers: 5, Enlisted: 56
- Armament: 2 × 4"/50 caliber guns; 1 × 3"/50 caliber gun; 2 × .50 BMG (12.7 mm) machine guns

USS Eagle 56 (PE-56) was a United States Navy World War I–era patrol boat that remained in service through World War II. On 23 April 1945, while towing targets for U.S. Navy bomber exercises off the coast of Maine, Eagle 56 was sunk by the German submarine U-853. Only 13 of the 62 crew survived.

The loss was classified as a boiler explosion until 2001, when historical evidence convinced the U.S. Navy to reclassify the sinking as a combat loss due to enemy action. Eagle 56 was the second to last U.S. Navy warship to be sunk by Nazi Germany during World War Two.

== Service history ==
Eagle 56 was one of 60 Eagle-class patrol craft built by Henry Ford late in World War I as submarine chasers, none of which saw action. Unpopular due to their poor sea handling, only eight remained in service at the time of World War II. Eagle 56 was patrolling off the Delaware Capes in January 1942. Eagle 56 remained almost constantly at sea during the Second Happy Time of the Battle of the Atlantic, during which Axis submarines attacked merchant shipping along the east coast of North America. When her depth charges were expended, a small ship from Cape May, New Jersey, would bring out a new supply.

Eagle 56 rescued survivors of Jacob Jones off Cape May in February 1942. It was damaged by collision with the submerged wreck of Gypsum Prince while rescuing survivors from the British freighter that had collided with the British tanker Voco on 4 March at the entrance to Delaware Bay, and was repaired using parts from another Eagle boat, and then assigned to the Key West sonar school in May 1942.

=== Sinking and investigation ===
Eagle 56 was assigned to Naval Air Station Brunswick from 28 June 1944. At noon on 23 April 1945, Eagle 56 exploded amidships, and broke into two pieces 3 mi (4.8 km) off Cape Elizabeth, Maine. The destroyer Selfridge was operating near Eagle 56 and arrived 30 minutes after the explosion to rescue 13 survivors from the crew of 62. Selfridge obtained a sharp, well-defined sonar contact during the rescue and dropped nine Mark IX Mod 2 depth charges without obvious result. According to a classified Navy report, U-853 had been operating in the waters off Maine.

At a Naval Board of Inquiry in Portland the following week, five of the 13 survivors claimed to have seen a submarine. Several spotted a red and yellow emblem on the submarine's sail. These insignia match the markings of U-853: a red horse on a yellow shield. Eagle 56's boiler was overhauled just two weeks before the sinking, and none of the boilers on the other 59 Eagle Boats had failed. Nevertheless, the official Navy inquiry concluded that Eagle 56 had suffered a boiler explosion.

== Later events ==
On 5 May 1945, U-853 sank the collier Black Point off the coast of Point Judith, Rhode Island, causing the loss of 12 lives. During the ensuing Battle of Point Judith, U-853 was chased and sunk by Navy and Coast Guard ships on 6 May.

On 1 June 1945, Rear Admiral Felix Gygax wrote, "at least equal evidence to support the conclusion that the explosion was that of a device outside the ship, the exact nature of which is undetermined. It might have been an enemy mine or an enemy torpedo." Ultimately, though, he endorsed the court's findings.

Because the Allies had cracked Germany's codes, United States intelligence knew in 1945 that U-boats had been sent across the North Atlantic to disrupt shipping in hopes of obtaining better surrender terms. However, only general warnings rather than specific information about this plan were passed to commanders.

=== Reclassification ===
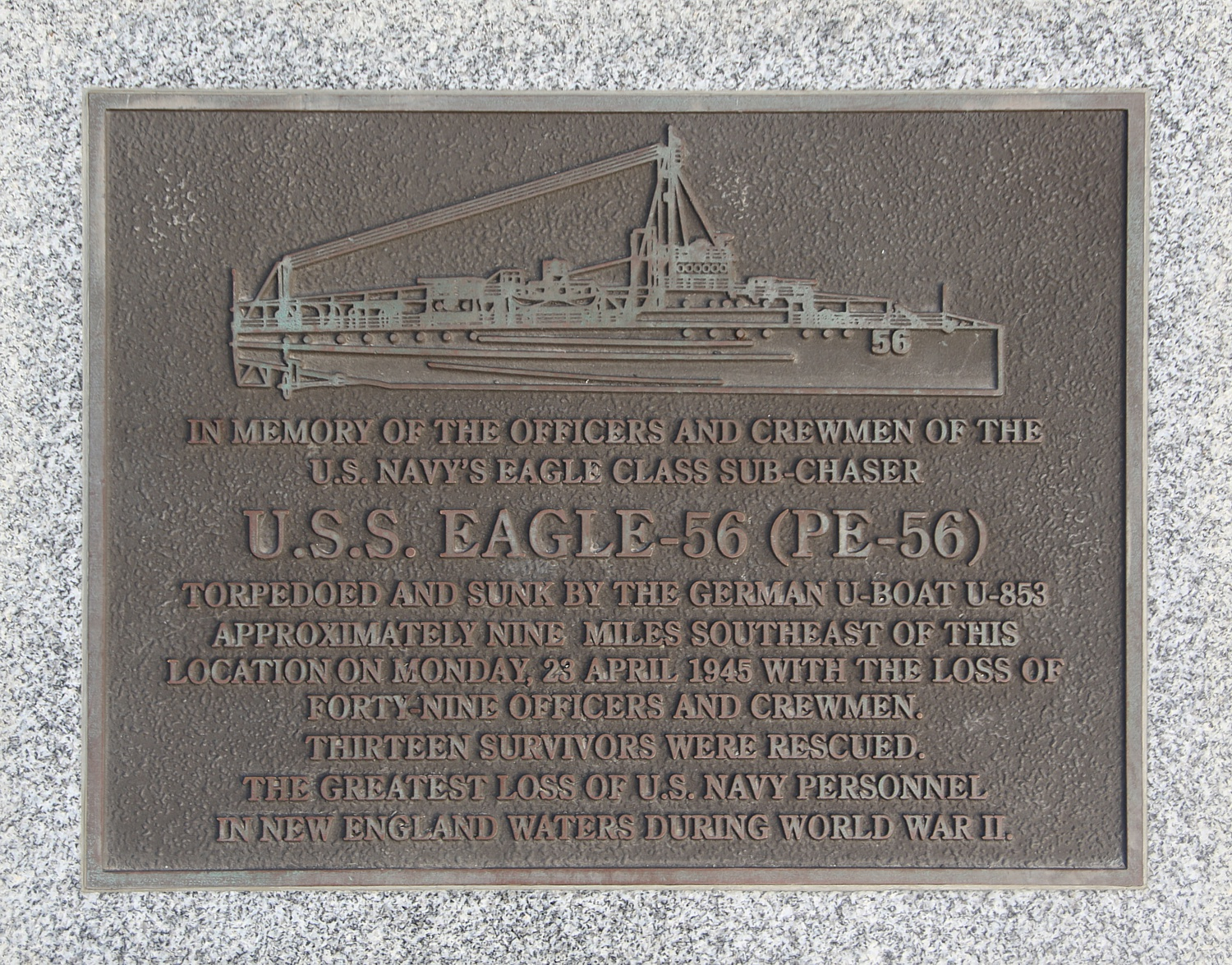
Plaque at Portland remembering the loss

In 2001, the Naval Historical Center reviewed the case and reclassified the sinking as a combat loss. In June 2001, Purple Heart medals were awarded to three survivors and the next of kin of those killed. As of 2007, this is the only time that the U.S. Navy has overruled its own Court of Inquiry.

A commemorative plaque was erected on the grounds of Fort Williams Park near Portland Head Light.

=== Wreck discovery ===
The ship's wreckage was located in June 2018, and visited by a civilian dive team later the same month. It lies five miles (8.0 km) off the coast of Maine at a depth of 300 feet (91 m). A video taken by the divers shows that USS Eagle 56's boilers are intact. The ship's steel plating is starting to rust away, but the site has been designated a war grave, and it has all the protections associated with that designation.
