= SS R.P. Resor =

Tanker ship built in 1936

Coordinates: 39.770°N 73.872°W

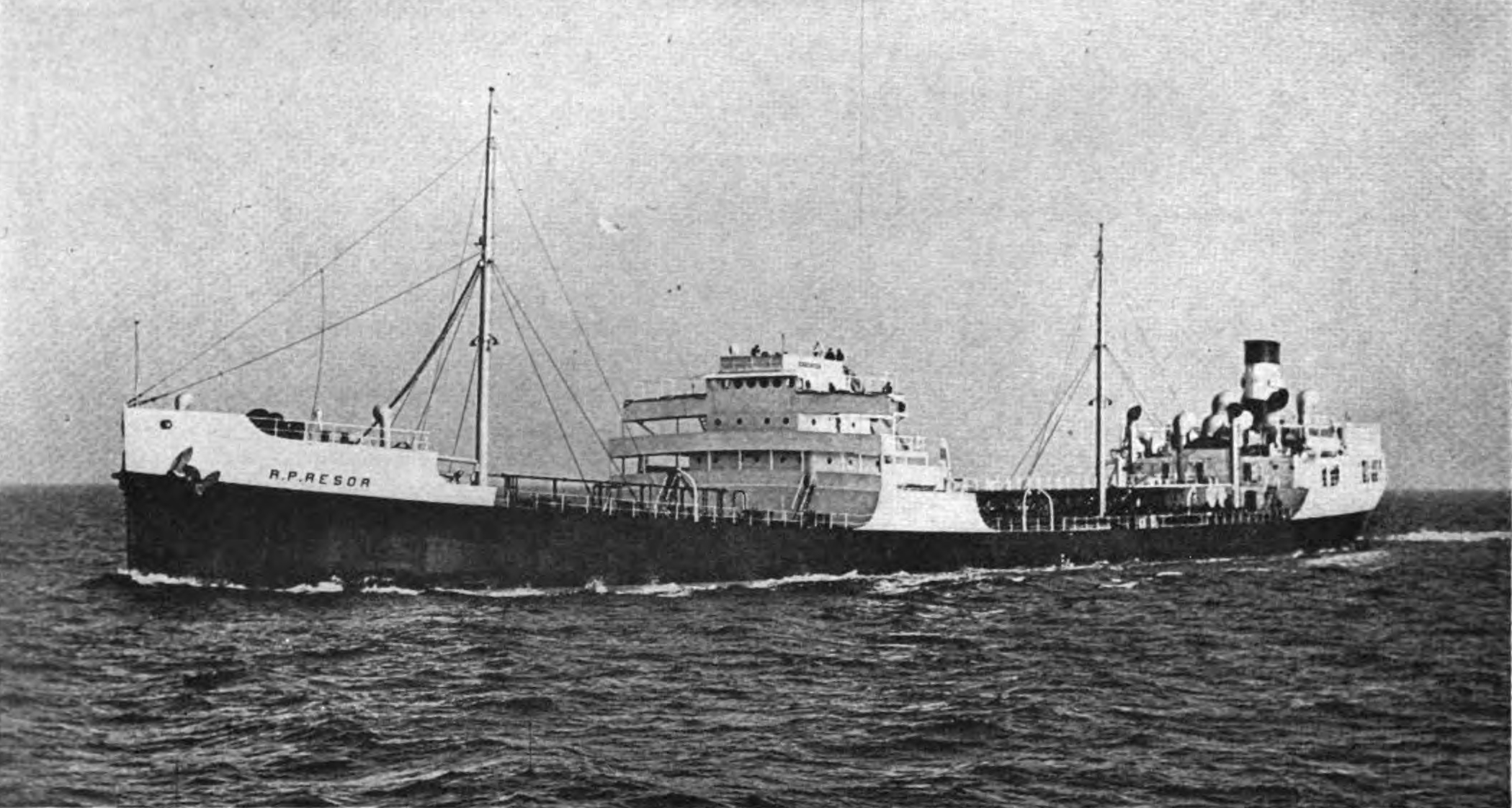
- R.P. Resor

History
- Name: R.P. Resor
- Owner: Standard Oil Company of New Jersey
- Port of registry: (United States)
- Builder: Federal Shipbuilding and Drydock Company, Kearny, New Jersey
- Launched: 1936
- Homeport: Wilmington, Delaware
- Fate: Torpedoed and sunk, 28 February 1942

General characteristics
- Tonnage: 7,541 GRT
- Length: 435 ft 9 in (132.82 m)
- Beam: 66 ft 6 in (20.27 m)
- Draft: 34 ft 7 in (10.54 m)
- Propulsion: Oil fired steam engine, twin screws
- Speed: 12.7 knots (23.5 km/h)
- Crew: 41 + 9 Navy Armed Guard gun crew
- Armament: 1 × 4"/50 caliber gun

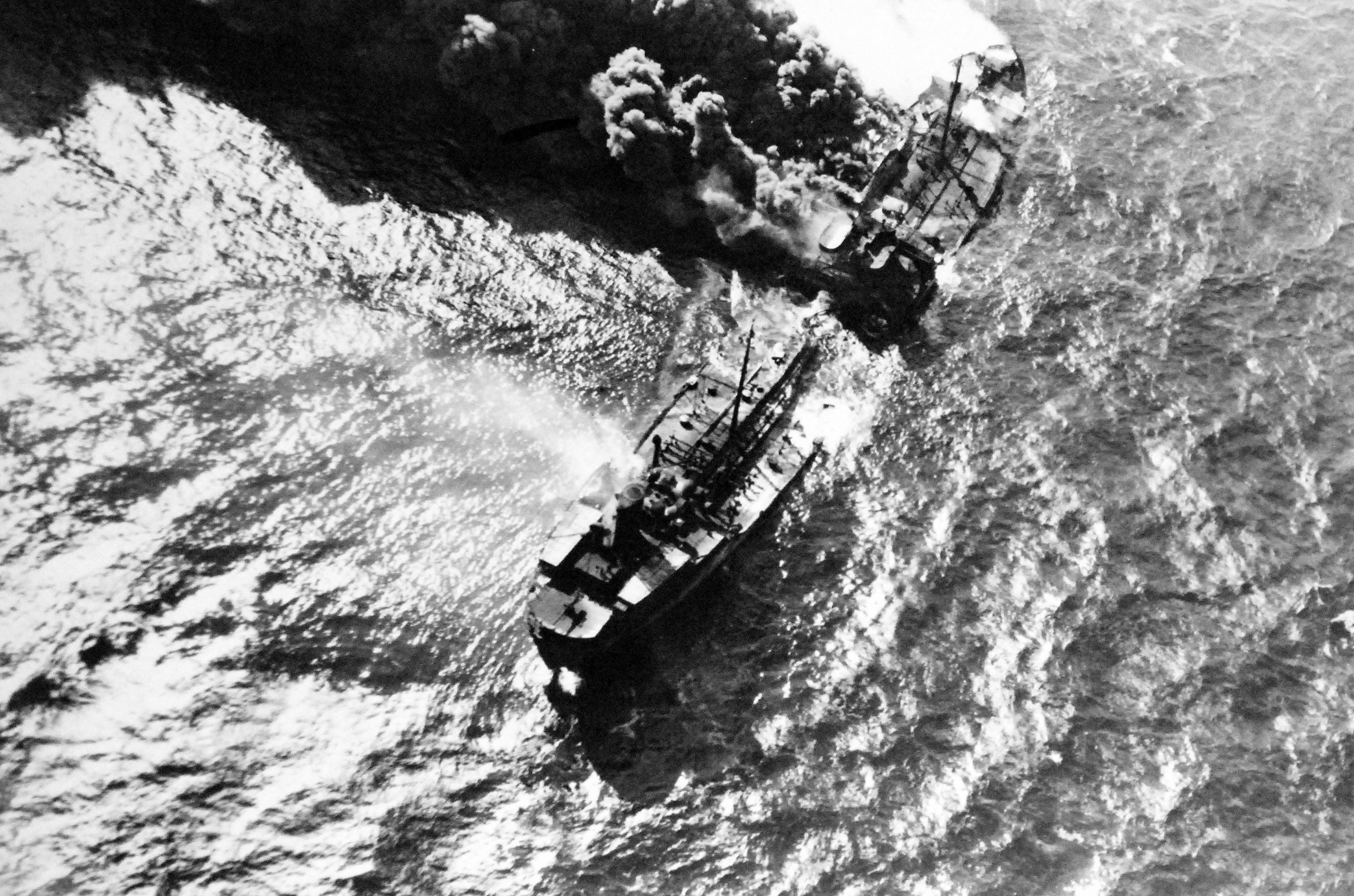
R.P. Resor sinking on February 28, 1942.

R.P. Resor was a tanker ship built in 1936 by the Federal Shipbuilding and Drydock Company of Kearny, New Jersey for the Standard Oil Company. She was torpedoed by the German U-boat U-578 on 28 February 1942 and later sank.

== Attack ==
Leaving Houston, Texas on February 19, 1942, R.P. Resor was carrying 78,729 barrels (12,516.9 m^{3}) of crude oil to be carried to Fall River, Massachusetts. She had a crew of 41 commanded by Captain Frederick Marcus and carried an ensign and eight United States Navy gunners. These men were needed to man a 4-inch (102 mm)/50-caliber gun mounted on the stern. German U-boat activity compelled R.P. Resor to steer a zigzag course with no navigation lights. Extra lookouts were posted.

According to the account of John Forsdal, seaman on the vessel during the attack, an unidentified object was spotted in the water. It flickered its lights, and subsequently, Forsdal reported by voice to the bridge. Soon after, a torpedo hit the port side. Debris flew into the air, and the deck erupted with flames. The crew, including Forsdal, were knocked down by the explosion. As he released the life raft and slid down the safety line into the water, three more torpedoes destroyed the port side hull. Oil poured out, coating the sea. Soon, the life raft had floated off. Forsdal swam for approximately 20 minutes before reaching the raft, which was half a mile from the burning R.P. Resor. On it, he joined radio operator Clarence Armstrong. John Forsdal released the following statement after being rescued:

Hooking my arms around the lifelines I rested for ten minutes or so in state of exhaustion. Sparks [Clarence Armstrong] was hanging to a lifeline on the other side of the raft. I was heavily weighted down with cold and clinging oil; the exertion of climbing up on the raft taxed my strength so seriously that I was unable to do anything but lie down. The cold and heavy oil seemed to be paralyzing my body.

=== Rescue ===
Flames were spotted by a lookout at the Shark River Lifeboat station, which was 20 miles (40 km) away. A picket boat was dispatched. In attempt to find survivors, they shone a searchlight, combing the surrounding areas. They saw Forsdal, and after much difficulty, manually pulled him over the gunwale. Radio Operator Armstrong was never seen again.

Now, many United States Coast Guard boats were on scene. Coxswain Daniel Hey was found, but due to congealed oil, they resorted to extreme measures, namely removing the oil-soaked, weighted clothes. Mr. Hey was one of the eight navy gunners on the ship. According to his testimony, he was sleeping in his bunk when the torpedo struck, and subsequently jumped off the boat, along with three other gunners. The port lifeboat had been effectively immobilized by the flames. Mr. Hey was the only one of the three to survive the burning sea. He also said that "he saw the starboard lifeboat shove off into the gunnel".

When the flames on the water's surface died out, Navy vessels and aircraft searched the surrounding area for survivors. One body was recovered, but no other survivors, nor was the starboard lifeboat ever found.

== Sinking and wreck ==
Since trapped air prevented the immediate sinking of R.P. Resor, it was partially afloat for 46 hours. USS Sagamore took the drifting wreck in tow. The tow ended about 30 miles (48 km) east of Barnegat Lighthouse, where the hulk grounded. The American Marine Insurance Syndicate paid $1,716,416 to the Standard Oil Company: the total hull value in its insurance agreement.

A buoy floats over the wreck, placed by the Hydrographic Office of the United States. The wreck was demolished and moved with wire to a safe depth of 50 feet (15 m). The wreck is partially destroyed, due to its relocation. The bridge and after tanks are unrecognizable. There is a large hole near the engine room, which allows easy access to inside rooms. The stern is still intact. Most of the superstructure has been destroyed. R.P. Resor was investigated by the Coast Guard's Sunken Tanker Project to determine if the tanker posed an ecological hazard. No further action was deemed necessary.
