= USCGC Earp =

USCGC Earp (ex-Eagle 22)
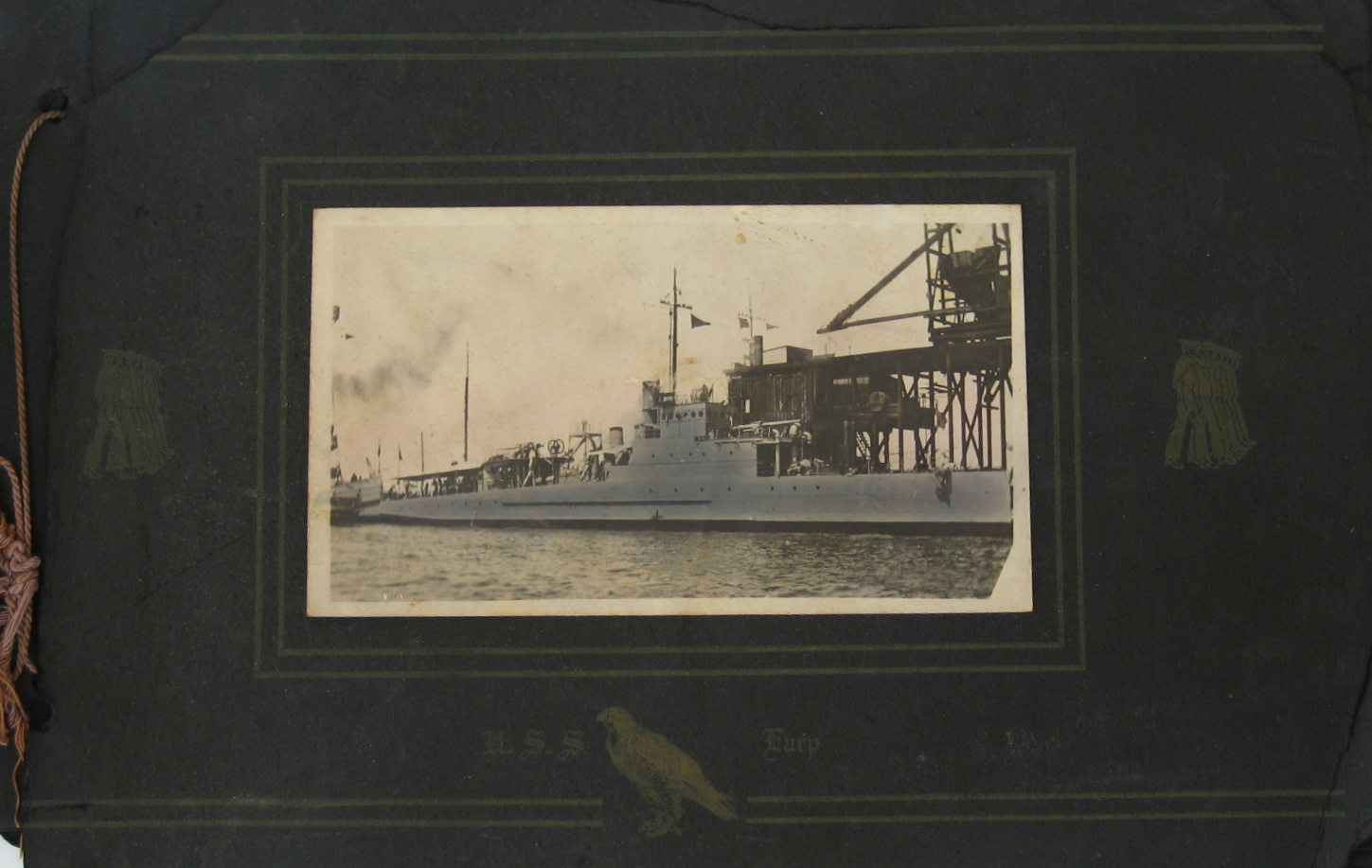

History

United States
- Builder: Ford Motor Co., Detroit, Michigan
- Laid down: 5 August 1918
- Launched: 10 February 1919
- Commissioned: 17 July 1919 (U.S. Navy); 17 March 1920 (U.S. Coast Guard)
- Decommissioned: 1 January 1923
- Home port: Honolulu, Hawaii

General characteristics
- Class & type: Eagle
- Displacement: 615 tons
- Length: 200 ft 9 in (61.19 m)
- Beam: 33 ft 1 in (10.08 m)
- Draft: 8 ft 6 in (2.59 m)
- Propulsion: Two Bureau Express boilers, Poole geared turbine, one shaft
- Speed: 18.3 kn (33.9 km/h; 21.1 mph)
- Complement: 61
- Armament: Two 4 in (100 mm)/50 gun mounts, and two M2 Browning .50 cal. machine guns

USCGC Earp (ex-Eagle 22) was a 200-foot (61 m) U.S. Coast Guard anti-submarine Eagle–class vessel built by Ford Motor Co. in Detroit, Michigan. Earp was named by the Coast Guard for Ensign James Marsden Earp, a crewmember killed in the September 1918 U-boat sinking of USCGC Tampa. All of the Eagle–class cutters were named for deceased Tampa coast guardsmen. Earp was designed for quick construction and was one of 100 ordered by the Navy. Five Eagle–class vessels were transferred to the Coast Guard and proved unsuitable for service because poor manueuvering characteristics and sea-keeping qualities. Earp was launched on 5 August 1918 and commissioned on 17 July 1919 by the United States Navy. The Navy transferred control of Earp to the Coast Guard on 19 December 1919 at New London, Connecticut. She was placed in commission by the Coast Guard at New London on 17 March 1920 and departed for the Coast Guard Yard at Curtis Bay, Maryland on 8 May. On 2 June 1920 she departed the yard and arrived at Norfolk, Virginia on 27 June after sea trials. On 9 July she was assigned a permanent station at Honolulu, Hawaii and arrived 13 December after repairs at Mare Island, California. Earp was decommissioned by the Coast Guard at Pearl Harbor on 1 January 1923 and returned to Navy control on 22 May 1923.

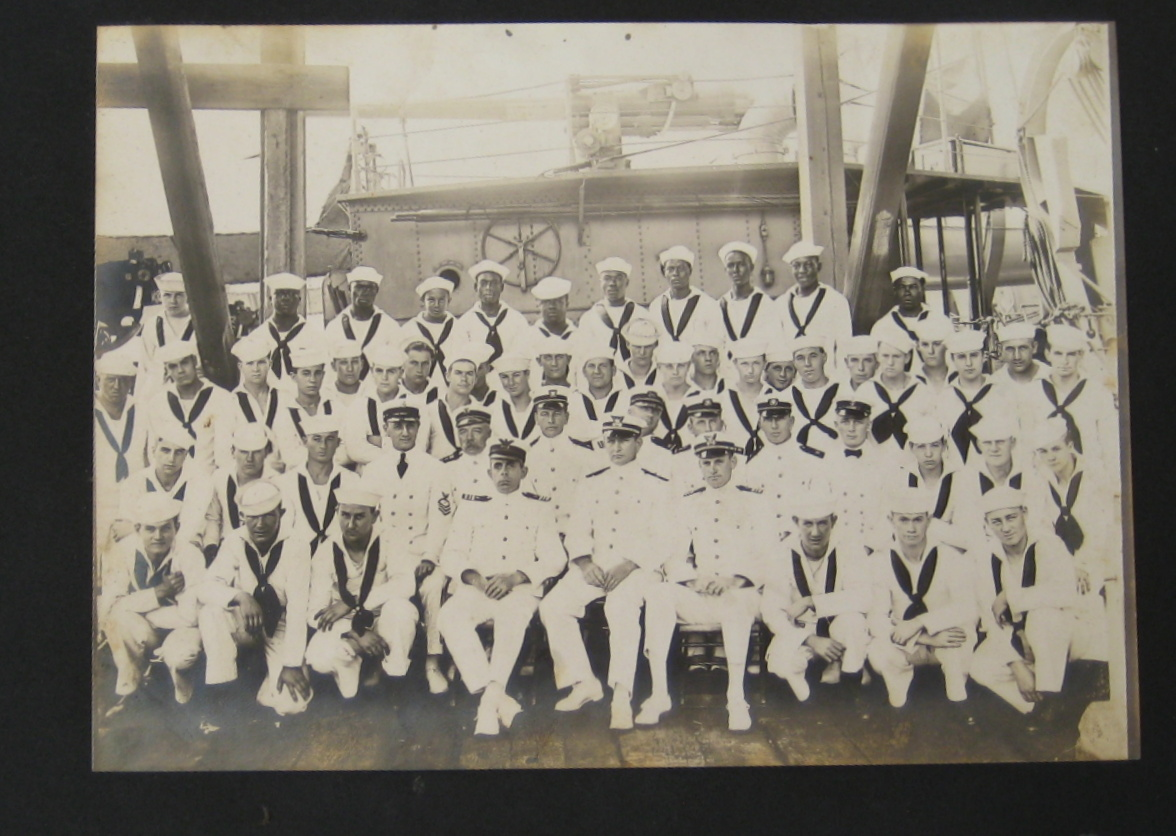
Complete crew of USCGC Earp – 1921

== References cited ==
- "Earp, 1920". Cutters, Craft, & U.S. Coast Guard Manned Army & Navy Vessels. U.S. Coast Guard Historian's Office.
- "Record of Movements, Vessels of the United States Coast Guard, 1790–December 31, 1933" (PDF). Historic Documents. U.S. Coast Guard Historian's Office.
- "Tampa (ex-Miami)". Cutters, Craft, & U.S. Coast Guard Manned Army & Navy Vessels. U.S. Coast Guard Historian's Office.
- Canney, Donald L. (1995). U.S. Coast Guard and Revenue Cutters, 1790–1935. Naval Institute Press, Annapolis, Maryland. ISBN 978-1-55750-101-1.
- Johnson, Robert Irwin (1987). Guardians of the Sea, History of the United States Coast Guard, 1915 to the Present. Naval Institute Press, Annapolis, Maryland. ISBN 978-0-87021-720-3.
