= Bagaduce-class tugboat =

Class of United States Navy fleet tugs (1918)

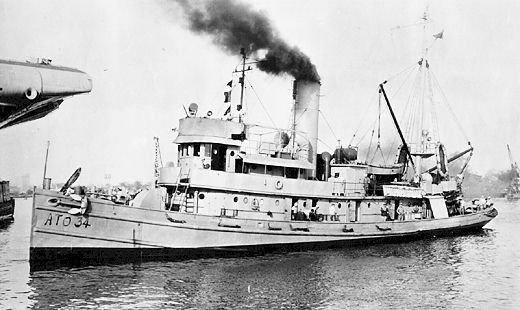
- USS Algorma (AT-34)

Class overview
- Operators: United States Navy; Royal Navy
- Preceded by: none
- Succeeded by: Navajo-class
- Built: 1918-1920
- In commission: 1918-1946
- Completed: 20
- Lost: 3
- Retired: 17
- Preserved: 0

General characteristics
- Type: Fleet tugboat
- Displacement: 1,000 long tons (1,016 t) (normal)
- Length: 156 ft 8 in (47.75 m)
- Beam: 30 ft (9.1 m)
- Draft: 14 ft 7 in (4.45 m)
- Speed: 12.4 knots (23.0 km/h; 14.3 mph)
- Armament: 2 × 3" guns

The Bagaduce class was a class of United States Navy fleet tugs. The first ship of the class, USS Bagaduce (AT-21) was laid down on 16 July 1918 at Buffalo, New York, by the Ferguson Steel and Iron Company. She was briefly named Ammonoosuc in February 1919, renamed Bagaduce on 24 February 1919, launched 5 April 1919, and commissioned at Buffalo on 18 September 1919. The Bagaduce was constructed as part of the World War I shipbuilding program, and was the first of 19 new steel tugs designed to serve as minesweepers and conduct heavy-duty towing work at navy yards.

== Ships ==
Ship name	Hull number	Commissioned	Decommissioned	Fate
Sagamore	AT-20	8 June 1918	31 August 1946	Sold to a commercial interest, 24 December 1947; scrapped, 1953
Bagaduce	AT-21	18 September 1919	22 June 1946	Fate unknown
Tadousac	AT-22	13 June 1919	10 April 1946	Destroyed, 10 April 1946
Kalmia	AT-23	18 November 1919	15 May 1946	Sold to a commercial interest, 21 January 1947; fate unknown
Kewaydin	AT-24	4 November 1919	10 December 1945	Fate unknown
Umpqua	AT-25	6 December 1919	24 May 1946	Sold to a commercial interest, 4 December 1946; fate unknown
Wandank	AT-26	23 March 1920	20 September 1946	Sold to a commercial interest, 20 September 1945; fate unknown
Tatnuck	AT-27	26 July 1919	12 September 1946	Sold to a commercial interest, 26 April 1947; fate unknown
Sunnadin	AT-28	20 October 1919	4 April 1946	Sold for scrap, 15 January 1947
Mahopac	AT-29	20 October 1919	12 September 1946	Fate unknown
Sciota	AT-30	13 November 1919	16 January 1946	Fate unknown
Koka	AT-31	18 February 1920	n/a	Ran aground, 7 December 1937; later sank
Napa	AT-32	5 December 1919	n/a	Scuttled to avoid capture, 8 April 1942
Pinola	AT-33	7 February 1920	31 January 1946	Fate unknown
Algorma	AT-24	15 May 1920	18 June 1946	Sold to a commercial interest, 23 December 1946; fate unknown
Carrabasset	AT-35	30 June 1920	26 July 1946	Fate unknown
Contocook	AT-36	20 August 1920	27 November 1933	Sold to the Royal Navy, 1940; commissioned as HMS Sea Giant (W-125); decommissioned, 1946; fate unknown
Iuka	AT-37	29 October 1920	15 August 1946	Sold to a commercial interest, 18 December 1947; fate unknown
Keosanqua	AT-38	9 December 1920	6 May 1946	Sold to a commercial interest, 11 July 1947; scrapped, 1968
Montcalm	AT-39	19 January 1921	24 May 1946	Fate unknown

== See also ==
- Sotoyomo-class fleet tug
- Type V ship - Tugs
- List of auxiliaries of the United States Navy
