= USS Mahopac (AT-29) =

American naval ship

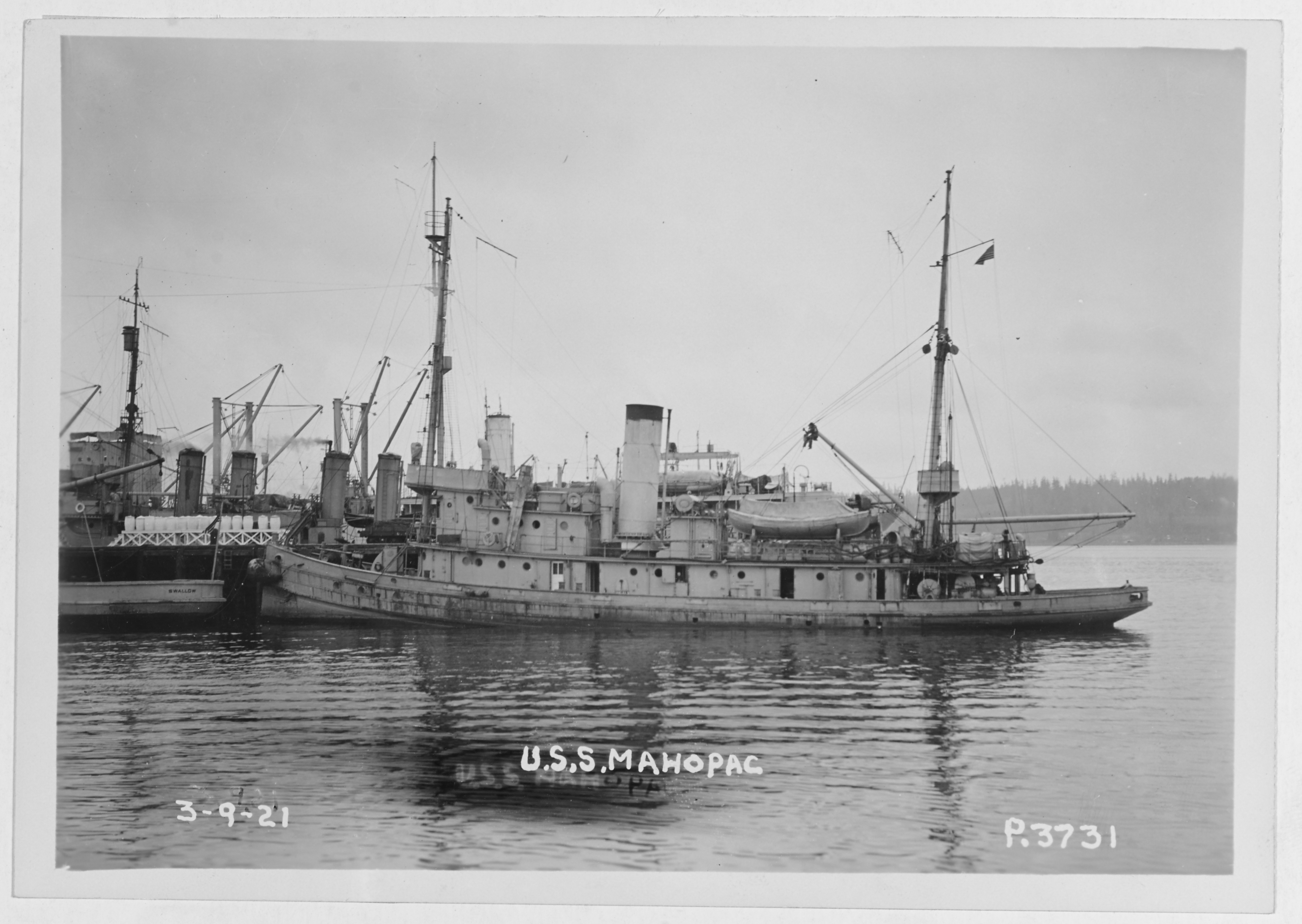
- USS Mahopac in 1921

History

United States
- Name: USS Mahopac
- Builder: Puget Sound Navy Yard
- Laid down: 30 November 1918
- Launched: 28 February 1919
- Commissioned: 20 October 1919
- Decommissioned: 12 September 1946
- Stricken: 29 October 1946
- Identification: AT-29
- Fate: Transferred to the Maritime Commission for disposal, 28 April 1947

General characteristics
- Class & type: Bagaduce-class fleet tug
- Displacement: 1,000 tonnes (980 long tons; 1,100 short tons)
- Length: 156 ft 8 in (47.75 m)
- Beam: 30 ft (9.1 m)
- Draft: 14 ft 7 in (4.45 m)
- Speed: 12.4 knots (23.0 km/h; 14.3 mph)
- Complement: 44
- Armament: 2 x 3" gun mounts

USS Mahopac (ATA-29) was a United States Navy fleet tug launched in 1919. She was a Bagaduce-class ship, a class of 19 steel tugs begun in 1918 which preceded the Navajo-class (later renamed the Cherokee).

The Bagaduce-class tugs were designed to serve as minesweepers and conduct heavy-duty towing work at navy yards. Mahopac was decommissioned in 1947.

It was one of three vessels of that name in the U.S. Navy to date, after the town of Lake Mahopac, New York. The first was the USS Mahopac (1864), a Canonicus-class Civil War monitor, which served until 1889; the third, USS Mahopac (ATA-196), was a Sotoyomo-class rescue tug, launched in 1944 and struck in 1976.
