= USS Montcalm =

Tugboat of the United States Navy

History

United States
- Name: USS Montcalm
- Namesake: Montcalm County, Michigan
- Builder: Staten Island Shipbuilding Co., Port Richmond, New York
- Laid down: 16 June 1919
- Launched: 26 February 1920
- Commissioned: 19 January 1921
- Decommissioned: 30 June 1932
- Recommissioned: 13 August 1935
- Decommissioned: 24 May 1946
- Reclassified: ATO-39, 15 May 1944
- Stricken: 13 June 1946
- Fate: Most likely scrapped

General characteristics
- Type: Bagaduce-class fleet tug
- Displacement: 795 long tons (808 t) light; 1,000 long tons (1,016 t) full
- Length: 156 ft 8 in (47.75 m)
- Beam: 30 ft (9.1 m)
- Draft: 14 ft 7 in (4.45 m)
- Speed: 13 knots (24 km/h; 15 mph)
- Complement: 44 officers and enlisted
- Armament: 1 × machine gun

USS Montcalm (AT-39) was a Bagaduce-class fleet tug of the United States Navy. The ship was laid down by the Staten Island Shipbuilding Company of Port Richmond, New York, on 16 June 1919; launched on 26 February 1920; and commissioned at New York Navy Yard on 19 January 1921.

== Service history ==
=== 1921–1932 ===
Assigned to the Navy Yard, Guantanamo Bay, Cuba, Montcalm departed New York on 2 March 1921, steaming via Norfolk, and arriving at Guantanamo on the 14th. The tug operated out of the Cuban base through 1923, making periodic voyages to Key West, Norfolk and ports in the Bahamas until sailing for Charleston, South Carolina, on 24 April 1923. Arriving on 1 May, Montcalm was repaired and served locally and at Philadelphia before returning to Guantanamo Bay on 19 June 1924. Annual voyages to Charleston for repairs and service missions to New York in late 1929 and 1931 alternated with active service in the Caribbean. Montcalm arrived at Philadelphia on 25 May 1932 and decommissioned there on 30 June.

=== 1935–1946 ===
Recommissioned on 13 August 1935, she left Philadelphia on 14 September for her new base, Port Pensacola, Florida. She operated on numerous voyages along the Gulf and east coasts, as far west as Galveston, Texas, and as far north as Norfolk. While stationed at Pensacola, the ship acted as plane guard for seaplane training, salvage ship, and naval aviation cadet training ship, in addition to performing her regular towing duties.

On 10 July 1939, the tugboat was reassigned to the Guantanamo Naval Station and for the remainder of her active career operated out of the Cuban base towing targets, and on salvage and towing missions throughout the Caribbean and to ports in the Southern United States. During World War II she continued her vital services in the Gulf of Mexico and the Caribbean. She was reclassified ATO‑39 on 15 May 1944.

Following the end of the war, the tug decommissioned at Charleston Navy Yard on 24 May 1946, was struck from the Naval Vessel Register on 13 June 1946, and was sold to J. C. Berkwit & Co., New York City, on 12 February 1947.
