= German submarine U-578 =

German World War II submarine

History

Nazi Germany
- Name: U-578
- Ordered: 8 January 1940
- Builder: Blohm & Voss, Hamburg
- Yard number: 554
- Laid down: 1 August 1940
- Launched: 15 May 1941
- Commissioned: 10 July 1941
- Fate: Missing in the Bay of Biscay since 6 August 1942; no explanation for her loss

General characteristics
- Class & type: Type VIIC submarine
- Displacement: 769 tonnes (757 long tons) surfaced; 871 t (857 long tons) submerged
- Length: 67.10 m (220 ft 2 in) o/a; 50.50 m (165 ft 8 in) pressure hull
- Beam: 6.20 m (20 ft 4 in) o/a; 4.70 m (15 ft 5 in) pressure hull
- Height: 9.60 m (31 ft 6 in)
- Draught: 4.74 m (15 ft 7 in)
- Installed power: 2,800–3,200 PS (2,100–2,400 kW; 2,800–3,200 bhp) (diesels); 750 PS (550 kW; 740 shp) (electric)
- Propulsion: 2 shafts; 2 × diesel engines; 2 × electric motors
- Speed: 17.7 knots (32.8 km/h; 20.4 mph) surfaced; 7.6 knots (14.1 km/h; 8.7 mph) submerged
- Range: 8,500 nmi (15,700 km; 9,800 mi) at 10 knots (19 km/h; 12 mph) surfaced; 80 nmi (150 km; 92 mi) at 4 knots (7.4 km/h; 4.6 mph) submerged
- Test depth: 230 m (750 ft); Crush depth: 250–295 m (820–968 ft)
- Complement: 4 officers, 40–56 enlisted
- Armament: 5 × 53.3 cm (21 in) torpedo tubes (four bow, one stern); 14 × torpedoes or 26 TMA mines; 1 × 8.8 cm (3.46 in) deck gun (220 rounds); 1 x 2 cm (0.79 in) C/30 AA gun

Service record
- Part of: 5th U-boat Flotilla; 10 July – 31 August 1941; 7th U-boat Flotilla; 1 September 1941 – 6 August 1942
- Identification codes: M 46 136
- Commanders: F.Kapt. Ernst-August Rehwinkel; 10 July 1941 – 6 August 1942
- Operations: 5 patrols: 1st patrol: a. 19 – 27 November 1941; b. 29 November – 4 December 1941; c. 6 – 10 December 1941; 2nd patrol: 15 – 28 January 1942; 3rd patrol: 3 February – 25 March 1942; 4th patrol: 7 May – 3 July 1942; 5th patrol: 6 August 1942
- Victories: 4 merchant ships sunk (23,635 GRT); 1 warship sunk (1,090 tons)

German submarine U-578 was a Type VIIC U-boat of Nazi Germany's Kriegsmarine during World War II.

She carried out five patrols, sank four ships of 23,635 gross register tons (GRT) and sank a warship of 1,090 tons.

She was posted missing in the Bay of Biscay since 6 August 1942, with no explanation for her loss.

== Design ==
German Type VIIC submarines were preceded by the shorter Type VIIB submarines. U-578 had a displacement of 769 tonnes (757 long tons) when at the surface and 871 tonnes (857 long tons) while submerged. She had a total length of 67.10 m (220 ft 2 in), a pressure hull length of 50.50 m (165 ft 8 in), a beam of 6.20 m (20 ft 4 in), a height of 9.60 m (31 ft 6 in), and a draught of 4.74 m (15 ft 7 in). The submarine was powered by two Germaniawerft F46 four-stroke, six-cylinder supercharged diesel engines producing a total of 2,800 to 3,200 metric horsepower (2,060 to 2,350 kW; 2,760 to 3,160 shp) for use while surfaced, two Brown, Boveri & Cie GG UB 720/8 double-acting electric motors producing a total of 750 metric horsepower (550 kW; 740 shp) for use while submerged. She had two shafts and two 1.23 m (4 ft) propellers. The boat was capable of operating at depths of up to 230 metres (750 ft).

The submarine had a maximum surface speed of 17.7 knots (32.8 km/h; 20.4 mph) and a maximum submerged speed of 7.6 knots (14.1 km/h; 8.7 mph). When submerged, the boat could operate for 80 nautical miles (150 km; 92 mi) at 4 knots (7.4 km/h; 4.6 mph); when surfaced, she could travel 8,500 nautical miles (15,700 km; 9,800 mi) at 10 knots (19 km/h; 12 mph). U-578 was fitted with five 53.3 cm (21 in) torpedo tubes (four fitted at the bow and one at the stern), fourteen torpedoes, one 8.8 cm (3.46 in) SK C/35 naval gun, 220 rounds, and a 2 cm (0.79 in) C/30 anti-aircraft gun. The boat had a complement of between forty-four and sixty.

== Service history ==
The submarine was laid down on 1 August 1940 at Blohm & Voss, Hamburg as yard number 554, launched on 15 May 1941 and commissioned on 10 July under the command of Fregattenkapitän Ernst-August Rehwinkel.

She served with the 5th U-boat Flotilla from 10 July 1941 and the 7th U-boat Flotilla for training from 1 September. She stayed with the latter organization for operations until her loss, from 1 October 1941 until 6 August 1942.

=== First and second patrols ===
U-432's first patrol was from Kirkenes in Norway, she was rammed by a Soviet escort on 25 November 1941 off the Kola Peninsula; damage was slight. She arrived back at Kirkenes on the 27th.

She then headed for the Atlantic Ocean via the gap separating the Faroe and Shetland Islands. She arrived at St. Nazaire in occupied France, on 28 January 1942.

=== Third patrol ===
Having left St. Nazaire on 3 February 1942, as part of Operation Drumbeat, (U-boat operations off the eastern seaboard of the United States), U-578 hit R.P. Resor on the 27th with a torpedo 20 nautical miles (37 km; 23 mi) east of Manasquan Inlet, New Jersey. The tug USS Sagamore attempted to take the ship in tow, but she capsized and sank 48 hours after the initial attack 31 nautical miles (57 km; 36 mi) east of Barnegat, also New Jersey.

The next day she sank the American destroyer USS Jacob Jones. The 'four-stacker', completed in October 1919, was the first warship to be lost to enemy action in US waters.

On the return leg toward France, she sank the in-ballast Ingerto on 12 March 1942 in mid-Atlantic. She docked at St. Nazaire on the 25th.

=== Fourth patrol ===
Patrol number four was the boat's longest (58 days), but in terms of tonnage sunk, her most successful. She attacked Polyphermus on 27 May 1942 340 nautical miles (630 km; 390 mi) north of Bermuda. She also sank Berganger on 2 June southeast of Cape Cod.

=== Fifth patrol and loss ===
The boat set out from St. Nazaire for the last time on 6 August 1942. She was posted missing in the Bay of Biscay from that date, with no explanation for her loss.

Forty-nine men died with U-578; there were no survivors.

== Previously recorded fate ==
Sunk on 10 August 1942 in the Bay of Biscay by depth charges from a Czechoslovak aircraft of No. 311 Squadron RAF. This attack was on U-135. Damage was minor.

== Summary of raiding history ==
Date	Ship Name	Nationality	Tonnage (Note: Merchant ship tonnages are in gross register tons. Military vessels are listed by tons displacement.)	Fate
27 February 1942	R.P. Resor	United States	7,451	Sunk
28 February 1942	USS Jacob Jones	United States Navy	1,090	Sunk
12 March 1942	Ingerto	Norway	3,089	Sunk
27 May 1942	Polyphemus	Netherlands	6,269	Sunk
2 June 1942	Berganger	Norway	6,826	Sunk

== Bibliography ==
- Busch, Rainer; Röll, Hans-Joachim (1999). German U-boat commanders of World War II : a biographical dictionary. Translated by Brooks, Geoffrey. London, Annapolis, Md: Greenhill Books, Naval Institute Press. ISBN 1-55750-186-6.
- Busch, Rainer; Röll, Hans-Joachim (1999). Der U-Boot-Krieg, 1939-1945: Deutsche U-Boot-Verluste von September 1939 bis Mai 1945 [German U-boat losses from September 1939 to May 1945] (in German). Vol. IV. Hamburg, Berlin, Bonn: Mittler. ISBN 3-8132-0514-2.
- Gröner, Eric; Jung, Dieter; Maass, Martin (1991). German Warships 1815-1945: U-boats and Mine Warfare Vessels. Vol. 2. Translated by Thomas, Keith; Magowan, Rachel. London: Conway Maritime Press. ISBN 0-85177-593-4.
