= USS Koka (AT-31) =

Tugboat of the United States Navy

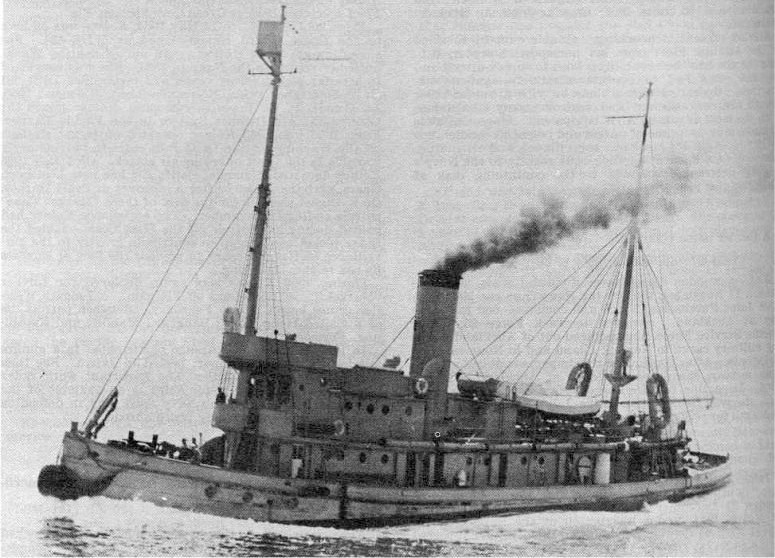
- USS Koka (AT-31)

History

United States
- Name: USS Koka (AT-31)
- Launched: 11 July 1919
- Commissioned: 18 February 1920
- Stricken: 2 March 1938
- Fate: Run aground off San Clemente Island, California on 7 December 1937

General characteristics
- Class & type: Bagaduce-class fleet tug
- Displacement: 1,000 tons
- Length: 156 ft 8 in (47.75 m)
- Beam: 30 ft (9.1 m)
- Draft: 14 ft 7 in (4.45 m)
- Propulsion: diesel, single propeller
- Speed: 13 knots (24 km/h; 15 mph)
- Complement: 46 officers and enlisted
- Armament: none

USS Koka (AT-31) was a Bagaduce-class fleet tug in the service of the United States Navy. Previously named Oconee, she was renamed Koka on 24 February 1919. She was launched 11 July 1919 by the Puget Sound Naval Shipyard, and commissioned 18 February 1920.

Assigned to the 11th Naval District, Koka sailed from Puget Sound to San Diego, California in March 1920, and spent the next 17 years performing various tug and target-towing services out of San Diego. One of its yearly duties, shared alternately with Navy Eagle boat 34 as related by Max Miller in his 1932 book I Cover The Waterfront, including taking a team to Guadalupe Island off Mexico to capture elephant seals for the San Diego Zoo. On 20 March 1934 she had the honor of towing USS Constitution out of San Diego on the homeward leg of Constitution's 1930s tour of the United States.

On 7 December 1937 Koka ran aground off San Clemente Island and was officially decommissioned the same day. She was declared unsalvageable and abandoned as a wreck on 22 January 1938. Her name was struck from the Naval Register on 2 March 1938. The wreck of the Koka lies in 10 feet (3.0 m) of water in Northwest Harbor, San Clemente Island.
