= USS Sagamore (AT-20) =

Tugboat of the United States Navy

History

United States
- Name: Sagamore
- Builder: Buffalo Dry Dock Co.
- Laid down: 24 May 1917
- Launched: November 1917
- Commissioned: 8 June 1918
- Decommissioned: 31 August 1946
- Stricken: 7 February 1947
- Fate: Scrapped in 1953

General characteristics
- Class & type: Bagaduce-class fleet tug
- Displacement: 969 long tons (985 t)
- Length: 156 ft 8 in (47.75 m)
- Beam: 30 ft 2 in (9.19 m)
- Draft: 14 ft 7 in (4.45 m)
- Speed: 13 kn (15 mph; 24 km/h)
- Complement: 61
- Armament: 2 × 3 in (76 mm) guns

USS Sagamore (AT-20) was a Bagaduce-class fleet tug which served in the United States Navy from 1917 to 1946.

Sagamore was originally laid down on 24 May 1917 as Commanche (SP-3296), as a steel-hulled ocean-going tug, at Buffalo Dry Dock Co., Buffalo, N.Y. under a War Shipping Board contract. Commanche was renamed Sagamore on 30 October 1917, launched in November 1917 and transferred to the Navy on 5 December 1917. She was completed and commissioned on 8 June 1918 at the Boston Navy Yard.

Sagamore was designated as a Fleet Tug (AT-20) on 17 July 1920. She was mostly employed in routine duties in New England. In March 1928 she was employed in the raising of the sunken submarine S-4. For his service in this operation, her commanding officer Chief Boatswain George Cregan, a Medal of Honor recipient, received the Navy Cross.

Sagamore was reclassified, Fleet Tug Old, (ATO-20) on 14 May 1944 and decommissioned on 31 August 1946, at the New York Navy Yard in Brooklyn, N.Y.

She was struck from the Naval Register on 28 January 1947 and transferred to the Maritime Commission for disposal.

Sagamore was sold on 24 December 1947, to Hughes Brothers of New York City for $11,327. She was acquired in 1948 by McAllister Brothers Towing and renamed John E. McAllister. She was scrapped in 1953 at Baltimore, Maryland.

== Awards ==
- World War I Victory Medal
- American Defense Service Medal
- American Campaign Medal
- World War II Victory Medal
