= SSK (hull classification symbol) =

USN symbol for hunter-killer submarines

SSK was the United States Navy hull classification symbol for a diesel-electric submarine specialized for anti-submarine duties. SS indicated that the vessel was a submarine, and the K suffix that it was a hunter-killer. The United States Navy does not currently operate any submarines of this type, and so the designation is inactive.

== History ==
The start of the Cold War in the mid-1940s and the threat of Soviet submarines in the Atlantic led several Western navies to build or adapt submarines to specialize in hunting other submarines. The changes included streamlining to make them quieter and improved acoustic sensors. This type of vessel was given the classification SSK in United States service. Due to tactical and financial considerations resulting from nuclear propulsion these changes were eventually incorporated into all submarines, allowing the SSK role to be subsumed into the regular attack submarine role and the classification became obsolete.

=== Barracuda-class construction ===
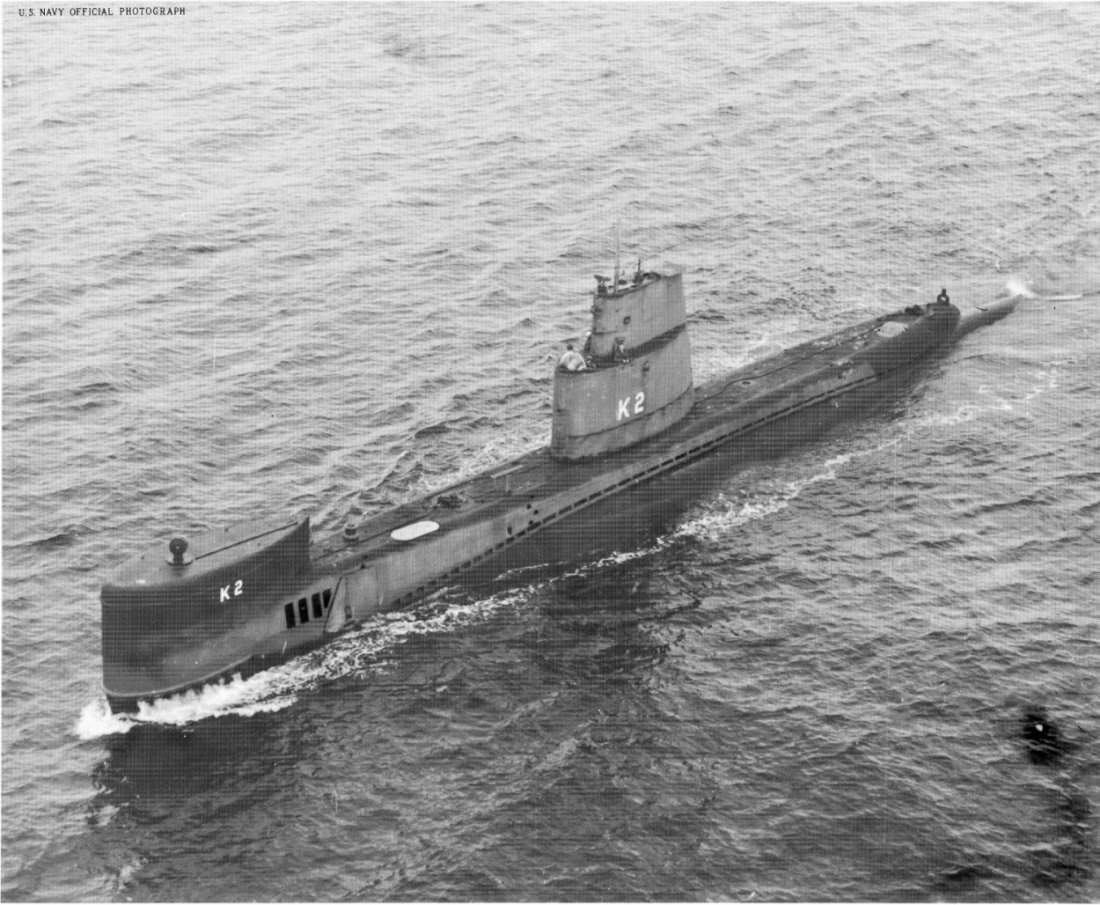
USS Bass (SSK-2)

The only purpose-built ones were the three Barracuda-class:

- USS Barracuda (SSK-1)
- USS Bass (SSK-2)
- USS Bonita (SSK-3)

These were small submarines equipped with enhanced hydrophones and designed to lie in wait for Soviet submarines off the Russian coast. They were designed to be cheaply built for easy mass-production in the event of a war, and were all reclassified as SS or SST boats in 1959 when they were relegated to training duties.

=== Gato-class conversions ===
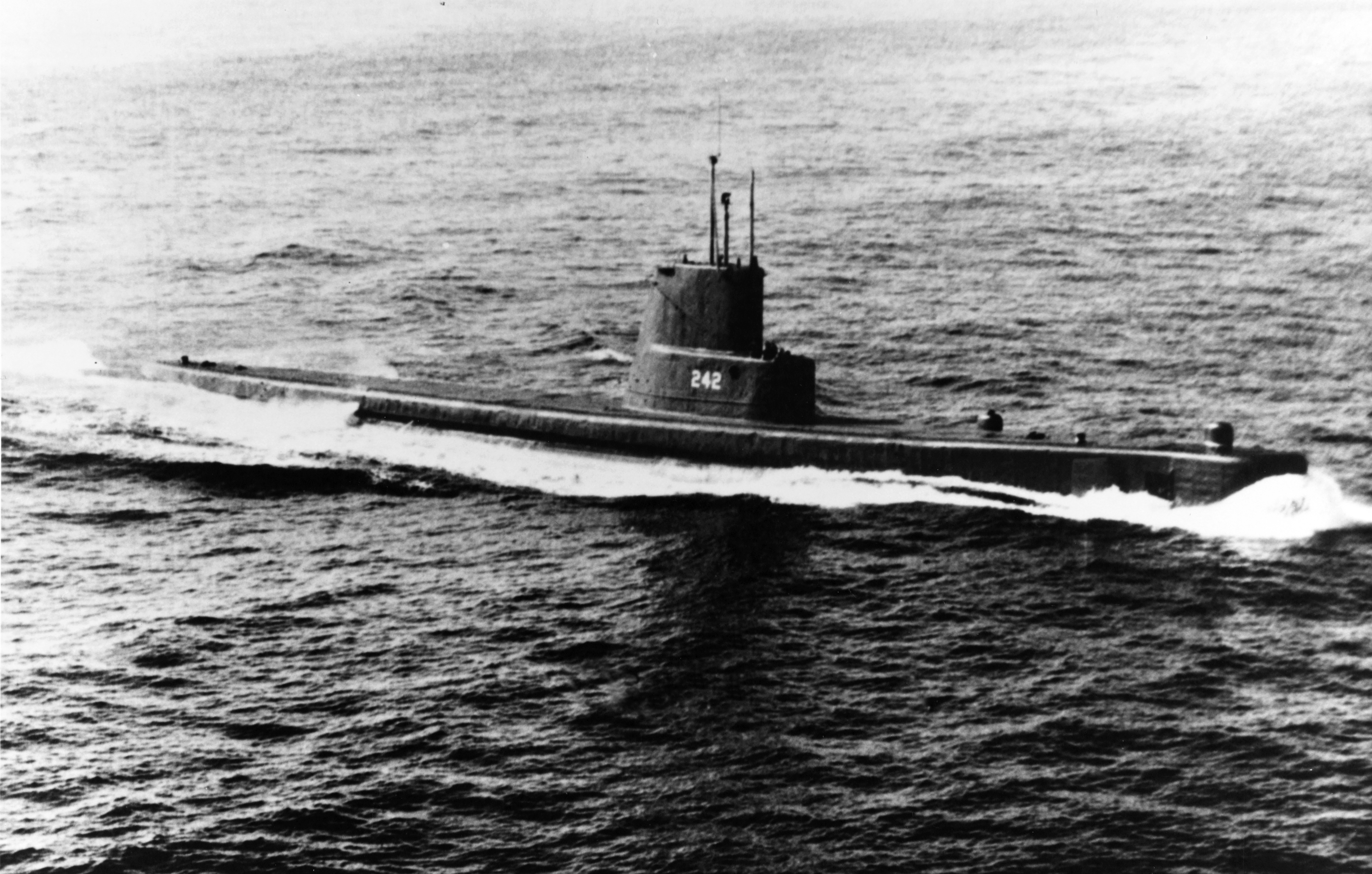
USS Bluegill (SSK-242)

Seven World War II Gato-class submarines were also given the SSK classification in the late 1940s following streamlining and sensor upgrades. These were:

- USS Grouper (SSK-214)
- USS Angler (SSK-240)
- USS Bashaw (SSK-241)
- USS Bluegill (SSK-242)
- USS Bream (SSK-243)
- USS Cavalla (SSK-244)
- USS Croaker (SSK-246)

=== SSKN ===
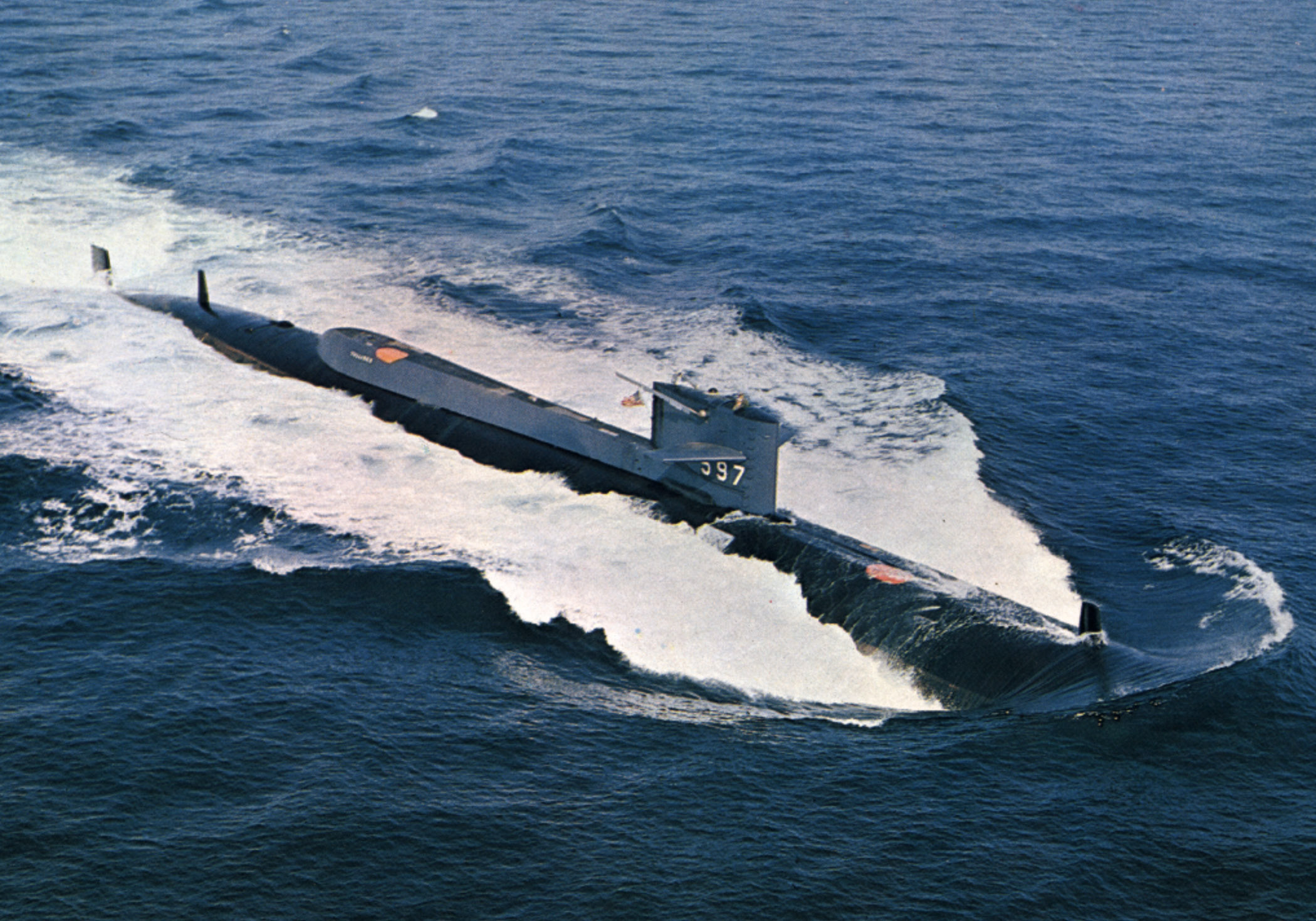
USS Tullibee (SSN-597)

For a brief period in the 1950s the US Navy listed the SSKN as a valid hull classification, because it was thought that a small relatively low-cost nuclear SSK would be needed given the high cost of the nuclear attack submarines. The USS Tullibee (SSN-597) was slated to become the first SSKN. However, during her construction it became apparent that it was impossible to build a low-cost nuclear SSK. It was decided to launch Tullibee with the SSN hull classification and retire the unused SSKN classification.

== Current uses ==
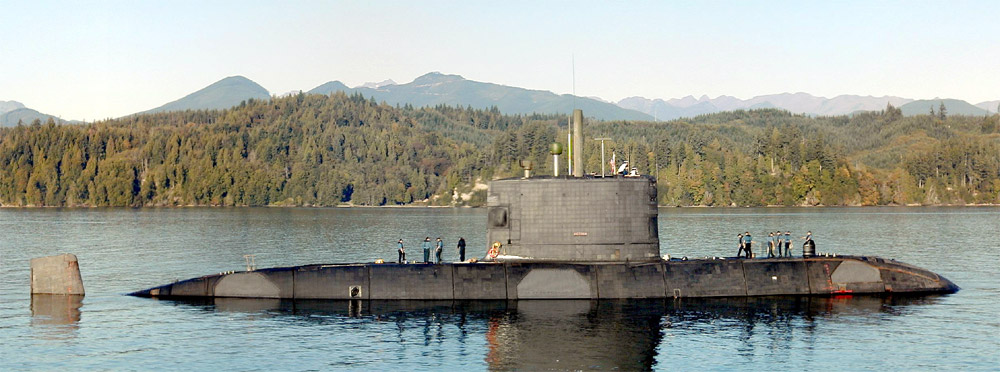
HMCS Victoria (SSK 876)

The Royal Canadian Navy operates diesel-electric hunter-killer submarines and uses this hull classification, for example the Canadian HMCS Victoria (SSK 876).

The term SSK term is sometimes currently used to indicate a diesel-electric patrol submarine.
