= Barracuda (disambiguation) =

A barracuda is a predatory fish found in tropical and subtropical oceans.

Barracuda or Baracuda may also refer to:

== Computing ==
- Barracuda (web framework), an MVC web framework for Java
- Seagate Barracuda, a line of computer hard drives
- Barracuda Networks, a company specializing in e-mail spam firewalls, web filters, email archivers, and backup solutions
- Opera Barracuda, the codename for version 11.10 of the Opera web browser

== Film and television ==
- Barracuda (1977 film), an American horror film
- Barracuda (1988 film), an Australian TV film
- Act of Piracy or Barracuda, a 1990 film
- Barracuda (1997 film), a French film by Philippe Haïm
- Barracuda (2017 film), an American film starring Allison Tolman
- Barracuda (upcoming film), an action thriller film
- Barracuda (TV series), a 2016 Australian TV miniseries

== Literature ==
- Barracuda (comics), a villain from Marvel Comics' The Punisher series
- Barracuda & Frollo, characters from Lion Comics
- Barracuda (novel), a 2013 novel by Christos Tsiolkas

== Music ==
- Baracuda (band), a German dance music project
- The Barracudas, a British band from the late 1970s to early 1980s
- Baracuda (rapper) (born 1983), Canadian hip hop artist
- Moby or Barracuda, techno recording artist

=== Albums ===
- Barracuda (Quantum Jump album)
- Barracuda (Kinky album)

=== Songs ===
- "Barracuda" (song), a 1977 song by Heart
- "Barracuda", a song by John Cale from Fear
- "Barracuda", a song by Jack Costanzo
- "Barracuda", a song by Noisestorm
- "Barracuda", a song by Afric Simone

== Vehicles ==
- Plymouth Barracuda, an automobile

=== Aircraft ===
- EADS Barracuda, an unmanned aerial vehicle, a joint venture between Germany and Spain c. 2006
- Fairey Barracuda, a carrier-borne torpedo bomber airplane, made in Britain during World War II
- Jeffair Barracuda, an all-wood experimental homebuilt aircraft design, built in the U.S. c. 1975
- Lancair Barracuda, a kit aircraft, produced in the U.S. c. 2018

=== Ships and submarines ===
- French Barracuda class submarine
- MCGS Barracuda, a patrol vessel of National Coast Guard of Mauritius.
- USS Barracuda (SP-845), a patrol boat in commission from 1917 to 1919
- USS Barracuda (SS-163), a submarine in commission from 1924 to 1937 and from 1940 to 1945
- USS Barracuda (SSK-1), a submarine in commission from 1951 to 1959
  - United States Barracuda-class submarine (1951)
- United States Barracuda-class submarine (1919) or V-boats V-1 through V-3
- NRP Barracuda, an Albacora class submarine developed for the Portuguese Navy
- Project 945 "Barrakuda", Soviet designation for Sierra-class submarines

== Other uses ==
- Barracuda-M, a cruise missile under development by the United States
- Barracuda Lounge, a New York City gay bar
- Eli Barracuda, a henchman in Evil Genius (video game) and Evil Genius 2: World Domination games.
- FN Barracuda, a revolver
- Saab Barracuda, a military camouflage system developed by the Swedish defense company Saab AB
- San Jose Barracuda, an American Hockey League team
- Acestrorhynchus or freshwater barracuda, a South American freshwater fish
- a special type of torpedo, see Superkavitierender Unterwasserlaufkörper

== See also ==
- USS Barracuda, a list of United States Navy ships and submarines
- HMS Barracouta
