= United States Barracuda-class submarine =

United States Barracuda-class submarine may refer to:

- United States Barracuda-class submarine (1919)
- United States Barracuda-class submarine (1951)
