= USS Bream =

Submarine of the United States

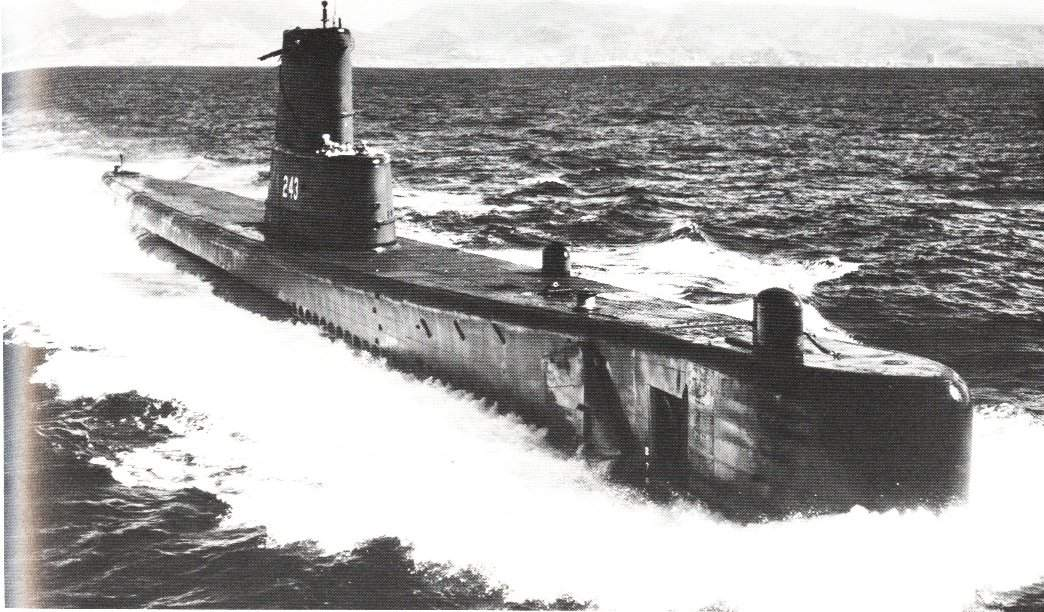
- Bream (SS-243) is seen here on 1 January 1962 off the coast of Hawaii, in hunter-killer submarine (SSK) configuration. The fairwater has been streamlined and all guns removed. Also, she has been fitted with an enlarged sonar dome on her new bow, blunt for improved performance while dived.

History

United States
- Builder: Electric Boat Company, Groton, Connecticut
- Laid down: 5 February 1943
- Launched: 17 October 1943
- Sponsored by: Mrs. Wreford G. Chapple
- Commissioned: 24 January 1944
- Decommissioned: 31 January 1946
- Recommissioned: 5 June 1951
- Decommissioned: 10 September 1952
- Recommissioned: 20 June 1953
- Decommissioned: 28 June 1969
- Stricken: 28 June 1969
- Fate: Sunk as a target off California, 7 November 1969

General characteristics
- Class & type: Gato-class diesel-electric submarine
- Displacement: 1,525 long tons (1,549 t) surfaced; 2,424 long tons (2,463 t) submerged
- Length: 311 ft 9 in (95.02 m)
- Beam: 27 ft 3 in (8.31 m)
- Draft: 17 ft (5.2 m) maximum
- Propulsion: 4 × General Motors Model 16-248 V16 Diesel engines driving electric generators; 2 × 126-cell Sargo batteries; 4 × high-speed General Electric electric motors with reduction gears; two propellers; 5,400 shp (4.0 MW) surfaced; 2,740 shp (2.0 MW) submerged
- Speed: 21 kn (39 km/h) surfaced; 9 kn (17 km/h) submerged
- Range: 11,000 nmi (20,000 km) surfaced at 10 kn (19 km/h)
- Endurance: 48 hours at 2 kn (4 km/h) submerged; 75 days on patrol
- Test depth: 300 ft (90 m)
- Complement: 6 officers, 54 enlisted
- Armament: 10 × 21-inch (533 mm) torpedo tubes; 6 forward, 4 aft; 24 torpedoes; 1 × 3-inch (76 mm) / 50 caliber deck gun; Bofors 40 mm and Oerlikon 20 mm cannon

USS Bream (SS/SSK/AGSS-243), a Gato-class submarine, was the first ship of the United States Navy to be named for the bream. She served during World War II, and her war operations extended from 1 June 1944 to 15 June 1945. During this period she completed six war patrols operating in the Java Sea, Celebes Sea, Sulu Sea, South China Sea, and Gulf of Siam. She sank two Japanese merchant ships totaling 6,934 gross register tons. In addition, Bream shared with the submarines USS Ray (SS-271) and USS Guitarro (SS-363) the destruction of a 6,806-gross register ton passenger-cargo ship. On 23 October 1944, while patrolling off western Luzon, Bream made a daring surface attack on a Japanese naval force, damaging the heavy cruiser Aoba.

After World War II, Bream operated in the United States Pacific Fleet during the 1950s and 1960s and saw service in the Vietnam War.

== Construction and commissioning ==
Bream was laid down on 5 February 1943 by the Electric Boat Co., Groton, Connecticut. She was launched on 17 October 1943 (sponsored by Mrs. Wreford G. Chapple, wife of the prospective commanding officer), and commissioned on 24 January 1944, with Commander Wreford "Moon" Chapple in command.

== Service history ==
=== World War II ===
==== January–May 1944 ====
Following shakedown training in the New London, Connecticut, area, Bream set out for the Pacific Ocean on 10 March 1944 and reached the Panama Canal Zone on 20 March 1944. She completed another series of exercises before transiting the Panama Canal on 10 April 1944 and continuing on to Brisbane, Australia, where she arrived on 8 May 1944.

On 10 May 1944, Bream left Australia bound for New Guinea. During her voyage, an Allied Liberty ship mistook her for a Japanese submarine and opened gunfire on her at a range of 12,000 yards (11,000 m) in the Coral Sea at 18°31′S 153°13′E, firing five or six rounds. Bream suffered no damage or casualties.

Bream reached Milne Bay, New Guinea, on 14 May 1944 and underwent voyage repairs alongside the submarine tender USS Euryale (AS-22). Upon completion of that work, Bream proceeded to Seeadler Harbor on the Admiralty Islands. She reached Seeadler Harbor on 29 May 1944 and began preparations for her first war patrol.

==== First war patrol ====
On 1 June 1944, Bream got underway for her first war patrol, assigned a patrol area in the vicinity of Halmahera Island. She made several contacts with Japanese vessels in Morotai Strait, but conditions prevented her from taking any offensive action. Her luck changed on 8 June 1944, however, when she spotted a Japanese convoy, selected a transport as a target, and unleashed a six-torpedo spread. Members of Bream′s crew heard one loud explosion before she went deep. Several depth charges detonated nearby, but she survived unscathed. Postwar study of Japanese records failed to confirm a kill.

On 13 June 1944, while Bream tracked another Japanese convoy, a depth-charge barrage forced her to break off pursuit before she could maneuver into position for an attack. Her luck improved again on 16 June 1944 when she next encountered a Japanese convoy. She fired torpedoes at two transports, and breaking-up noises reverberated throughout the submarine shortly thereafter as the 5,704-gross register ton Japanese cargo ship Yuki Maru disintegrated and went to the bottom. Several days after that attack, damage to a hatch gasket in Bream′s conning tower while she was submerged allowed water to flood into her pump room and knock out all electrical power in the room. This forced Bream to head for Seeadler Harbor, where she arrived on 29 June 1944. Work to correct the damage began shortly thereafter.

==== Second war patrol ====
Following repairs, refitting, and training, Bream began her second war patrol on 21 July 1944, when she got underway for a patrol area in waters off the southern Philippine Islands. On 29 July 1944, she had almost reached the entrance to Davao Gulf when flames broke out in her maneuvering room. Centered over the port main motor, the fire ignited cork and auxiliary cable insulation in the overhead. Fifteen minutes after it broke out, the blaze was extinguished. The damage was not serious enough to force Bream to terminate her patrol, and she proceeded to the coast of Mindanao.

On 7 August 1944, Bream moved to an area off Davao Gulf in an attempt to intercept traffic coming from the Palau Islands. She encountered Japanese ships but expended no torpedoes. On the morning of 26 August 1944, as she retired toward Fremantle, Australia, Bream spotted a Japanese airplane. The plane dropped a bomb which exploded near her as she dived, raised her stern about 20 feet (6.1 m), and shook her severely. A second bomb also detonated nearby and inflicted considerable damage. Nevertheless, Bream put into Brisbane safely on 6 September 1944.

==== Third war patrol ====
Bream underwent a refit by Euryale before beginning her third war patrol, getting underway for Darwin, Australia, on 2 October 1944. She paused at Darwin on 9 October for minor repairs and refueling before continuing on to her patrol area off the Philippine Islands between the northern end of Palawan Passage and Manila. On 16 October 1944, she sighted a two-masted barge with an escort but decided to let them pass to avoid alerting more valuable targets of her presence.

On 23 October 1944, three large ships — two Imperial Japanese Navy light cruisers and one heavy cruiser — appeared on Bream’s radar scope. One of the Japanese warships approached to within 800 yards (730 m) on Bream′s port quarter before Bream fired six torpedoes. Soon thereafter, Bream’s crew heard three loud explosions and believed that they had sunk a Japanese cruiser. A study of Japanese records after the war revealed that Bream had damaged the Japanese heavy cruiser Aoba severely enough to keep her from participating in the Battle of Leyte Gulf of 23–26 October 1944. Bream endured intermittent depth charging over the next five hours, but suffered no damage.

On 24 October 1944, Bream picked up six survivors of a Japanese ship sunk several days before by the submarine USS Bluegill (SS-242). On 25 October, she moved into position for an attempt to intercept the Japanese fleet retiring from Philippine waters after Japan's defeat in the Battle of Leyte Gulf. On 30 October 1944, she spotted a Japanese convoy, fired a six-torpedo spread at a large transport, and went deep to avoid depth charges. Her torpedoes damaged the transport, but it was able to continue under its own power.

On 4 November 1944, Bream fired four torpedoes at another Japanese transport, but all missed. After weathering a total of eight depth charges, she eluded her pursuers and resumed her patrol. On 6 November, she came upon two Japanese cruisers and began closing for an attack on the leading ship. After careful maneuvering to avoid the cruiser's escorts, she fired four torpedoes. Some Bream crewmen reported three explosions, but no damage to any Japanese ship seems to have resulted. Bream then shaped a course for Fremantle, where she arrived on 22 November 1944.

==== Fourth war patrol ====
Following refit and training, Bream commenced her fourth war patrol on 19 December 1944. She entered Exmouth Gulf on the coast of Western Australia on 22 December 1944 and refueled there that same day. She continued on through Lombok Strait northbound, entered the Java Sea, spotted a sailboat on 31 December, and decided to attack it with her 4-inch (102 mm) gun. During the action, a Japanese plane approached, forcing Bream to cease fire and dive.

On 9 January 1945, Bream began patrolling the western approaches to Balabac Strait. After four uneventful days, she moved to the northern end of the strait but again made no contacts and so shifted to Miri on the coast of Borneo for reconnaissance work. She sighted a large Japanese vessel on 24 January, but the contact proved to be a hospital ship. Bream transited Lombok Strait southbound on 4 February 1945, paused at Onslow, Australia, for refueling on 6 February, and finally arrived at Fremantle on 10 February 1945.

==== Fifth war patrol ====
Bream left Australia on 7 March 1945 for her fifth war patrol, made a refueling stop at Exmouth Gulf on 10 March, and proceeded through Lombok Strait northbound to the shipping lanes between Balikpapan on Borneo and-Surabaya on Java. On 13 March 1945, she intercepted two Japanese "sea trucks" — the U.S. term for small cargo ships — and sank them with her 4-inch (102 mm) gun. On 14 March, she came across a Japanese convoy of three small cargo ships and an escort. She fired three bow tubes at the leading cargo ship, but all of them broached. She then got off one more torpedo, and it seemed to hit the ship, which blew up with a tremendous explosion. However, postwar accounting failed to confirm a kill.

On 15 March 1945, Bream sighted a Japanese escort destroyer and began preparing for an attack. However, the destroyer detected Bream and began depth-charging her. Several depth charges went off close aboard and drove Bream to the bottom in 100 feet (30 m) of water. Bream remained on the ocean floor, mired in mud, for five hours and underwent repeated depth-charge barrages. During one attack, her conning tower hatch was lifted, forcing her crew to abandon the conning tower and secure it by closing the lower hatch. When the destroyer gave up the chase later that night, Bream surfaced and began evaluating the extent of her damage. The damage proved extensive, and she spent several days making temporary repairs.

Bream later detected two ships on radar that proved to be Japanese cargo ships. She fired four torpedoes from her bow tubes, but all four promptly sank. Apparently the tubes had been damaged in the encounter with the Japanese escort destroyer. Bream then set a course through Lombok Strait for Australia and reached Fremantle on 22 March 1945. she underwent a refit, during which both of her periscopes, her starboard propeller shaft, and both of her screws were replaced, and the damage to her torpedo tubes was corrected.

==== Sixth war patrol ====
On 20 April 1945, Bream commenced her sixth war patrol. She transited Lombok Strait northbound on 25 April 1945 and early on the morning of 26 April spotted what appeared to be an American submarine. The submarine quickly turned and headed toward Bream, which dived and manned her battle stations. Several depth charges dropped by a Japanese escort vessel shook Bream, but she managed to clear the area safely. A few hours later, she encountered two small Japanese patrol boats, but they were too small to merit a torpedo attack.

On 29 April 1945, while patrolling off southern Borneo, Bream picked up the trail of a Japanese oiler. After stalking the oiler for several hours, she fired four torpedoes at it. The first torpedo hit, and the oiler disintegrated in a mass of flames. Bream continued her patrol uneventfully until pulling into port at Subic Bay on Luzon in the Philippines on 14 May 1945 for voyage repairs and fuel. On 16 May, she put back out to sea and headed for lifeguard duty off the southern tip of Formosa. During her time on station, she rescued five downed American aviators. On 31 May 1945, she headed for Saipan in the Mariana Islands, where she arrived on 5 June 1945.

==== End of war ====
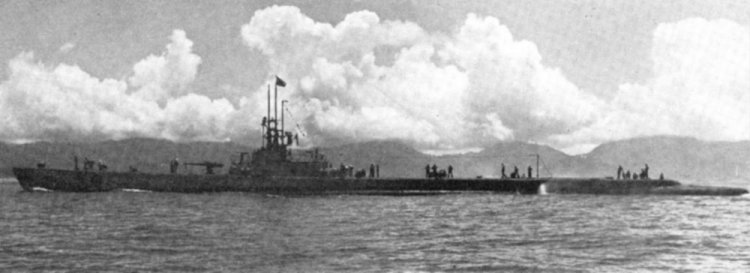
Bream (SS-243) returning to base with periscopes raised and battle flags flying in June 1945. (from U.S. Warships of World War Two).

Bream departed Saipan on 6 June 1945 and, following a two-day stop at Pearl Harbor, Hawaii, arrived at San Francisco, California, on 24 June 1945. Upon her arrival, she began an overhaul at the Bethlehem Steel Company shipyard in San Francisco. While the work was in progress, the war in the Pacific ended on 15 August 1945 (14 August on the other side of the International Date Line in San Francisco). Bream later transferred to the Mare Island Naval Shipyard at Vallejo, California. She was decommissioned there on 31 January 1946 and was laid up in the Pacific Reserve Fleet.

=== 1950s ===
As a part of the Navy's fleet expansion program in response to the outbreak of the Korean War in June 1950, Bream was recommissioned on 5 June 1951 and reported to Submarine Squadron 3, United States Pacific Fleet. From June 1951 to August 1952 she engaged in the training of submarine crews and services to the Fleet Sonar School at San Diego, California.

On 10 September 1952, Bream was decommissioned to undergo conversion to an antisubmarine "hunter-killer submarine" at the Hunters Point Naval Shipyard in San Francisco. The conversion included the installation of a snorkel — which enabled her to take in air and operate her diesel engines while submerged — streamlining of her conning tower, improving the habitability of the crew's living spaces, and the installation of special sonar listening equipment. She was redesignated SSK-243 on 18 February 1953. She was recommissioned on 20 June 1953.

Bream resumed operations with the Fleet Sonar School at San Diego. She also took part in numerous Pacific Fleet operations and exercises and conducted submarine crew training. She commenced a cold-weather training cruise to Alaska in September 1954 and made a stop at Pearl Harbor before returning to San Diego on 15 November 1954. She continued local operations along the coast of California until May 1955, when she made another voyage to Pearl Harbor. During her stay in Hawaii from 7 to 24 May 1955, she participated in an extensive antisubmarine warfare operation. She returned to San Diego late in May 1955 and resumed normal operations until late September 1955. On 22 September 1955, she entered Hunters Poit Naval Shipyard for an overhaul.

In February 1956, Bream′s home port changed to Pearl Harbor and she was assigned to Submarine Squadron 7, Submarine Division 72. She left Pearl Harbor on 6 March 1956 for an extended cruise in the western Pacific. She reached Yokosuka, Japan, on 11 June 1956 and operated in that area during the next two months. In early August 1956, he made a short cruise to Chinhae, South Korea, and returned to Yokosuka via Yokohama, Japan. In early October 1956 he made a return visit to Chinhae and a call at Hong Kong for shore leave during the first week of November 1956. She began the voyage back to Hawaii on 2 December 1956 and arrived at Pearl Harbor on 9 December.

From January to May 1957, Bream carried out local operations in the Hawaiian Islands from her base at Pearl Harbor. She commenced a trip to San Francisco 4 June 1957, arriving there on 13 June. After a week's visit, Bream returned to Hawaii and remained at Pearl Harbor until mid-July 1957, when she began a cruise to Alaska from which she did not return until early September 1957. She departed Pearl Harbor on 31 October 1957 bound for the Far East. Following port calls at Pago Pago in American Samoa and Auckland, New Zealand, she reached Yokohama on 25 December 1957 She departed Yokohama on 7 January 1958 bound for Subic Bay on Luzon in the Philippines. Among her later ports of call were Yokosuka, Japan, and Hong Kong. After three more months of providing services in support of United States Seventh Fleet ships, Bream returned to Pearl Harbor early in April 1958.

Shortly after her arrival, Bream began an overhaul at the Pearl Harbor Naval Shipyard. Her overhaul was completed on 13 September 1958, and she resumed local operations in Hawaiian waters. She sailed for East Asia on 6 April 1959, reached Yokosuka on 18 April, and remained there until 28 April. She then proceeded to the Philippines for operations in Manila Bay, after which she visited Hong Kong and Buckner Bay on Okinawa. On 2 June 1959, she returned to Yokosuka, which became her base of operations for the remainder of June. In July 1959, she got underway for special operations. While carrying out that assignment, she reverted to the hull number SS-243 in August 1959. She stopped briefly at Yokosuka again before departing Japanese waters on 21 September 1959 on her way to Pearl Harbor. She arrived at Pearl Harbor on 2 October 1959.

=== 1960s ===
Bream carried out local operations in Hawaiian waters until 26 November 1960, when she again departed for Japan. After a stop at Chichi Jima in the Bonin Islands on 9 December 1960, she arrived at Yokosuka on the 11 December. Among her ports of call during this deployment were Atami, Japan; Buckner Bay; Hong Kong; Manila and Subic Bay, Philippines; and Guam in the Mariana Islands. The cruise ended on 24 May 1961 when Bream arrived at Pearl Harbor. She participated in local operations in HAwaii until 1 September 1961, when she entered the Pearl Harbor Naval Shipyard for an overhaul.

Bream left the shipyard on 28 January 1962 and got underway for San Francisco on 1 February. She arrived at San Francisco on 10 February 1962 and moved to Long Beach. California, a few days later. She left California on 19 February 1962 and returned to Pearl Harbor. During the next few months, she alternated between local training in Hawaiian waters and upkeep at Pearl Harbor. She began another cruise to the western Pacific on 8 August 1962 and visited Yokosuka, Japan, and Chinhae, South Korea, in the fall and early winter of 1962. She also provided services to Task Group 70.4, a Pacific Fleet anrisubmarine "hunter/killer" group. She also took part in Exercise Pilot Light before pulling into port at Yokosuka for the Christmas holidays in December 1962.

Bream departed Yokosuka on 1 January 1963 en route to Okinawa. After briefly pausing there, she moved on to Hong Kong. She also visited Guam before arriving at Pearl Harbor on 2 February 1963. She then participated in local operations until 27 August 1963, when she began a special operation. That mission terminated at Adak in the Aleutian Islands on 18 October 1963. She departed Alaskan waters on 20 October and visited Vancouver, British Columbia, Canada, before calling at Seattle, Washington. She arrived at Pearl Harbor on 13 November 1963 and spent the rest of 1963 in local operations.

On 1 February 1964, Bream was reclassified as an auxiliary submarine and redesignated AGSS-243. She continued to operate from Pearl Harbor through May 1964. On 1 June 1964, she got underway for her new home port, San Diego, and arrived there on the 11 June 1964. She was assigned to Submarine Squadron 3 and operated in the San Diego area for approximately two months. On 31 August 1964 she entered the Mare Island Naval Shipyard for an overhaul which was completed on 26 January 1965.

After her overhaul, Bream began a training cruise which included stops at Port Angeles, Bangor, and Bremerton, Washington. She returned to Mare Island Naval Shipyard on 27 February 1965 for the installation of a new battery and a diesel engine overhaul before finally returning to San Diego on 11 July 1965 and resuming local operations.

Bream departed California on 12 November 1965 for Vietnam War operations in the western Pacific with the U.S. Seventh Fleet. Upon her arrival in waters off Vietnam, she assumed duty on Yankee Station. She was relieved on 6 January 1966 and headed for Thailand. She visited Sattahip and Bangkok and held joint operations with the Royal Thai Navy. On 20 January 1966, she headed for Kaohsiung, Taiwan, and arrived there on 26 January. She operated from Kaohsiung until 16 February 1966, when she sailed for Yokosuka, where she conducted local operations until 15 March 1966. She then departed Japan for the Philippines. After a voyage during which she provided services to aircraft, she finally reached Naval Station Sangley Point in the Philippines on 29 March 1966. She later made a brief call at Hong Kong for shore leave before returning to Yokosuka on 16 April 1966.

Bream left Japan on 24 April 1966 and headed back to the United States. After a short stop at Pearl Harbor in early May 1966, she arrived in San Diego on the 15 May. Following a leave and upkeep period, shcarried out local operations from San Diego until midsummer 1966, when she made a brief visit to the Hunters Point Naval Shipyard in San Francisco for installation of communications equipment. She returned to San Diego on 6 August 1966 to resume local operations, which continued until the Christmas holidays in December 1966.

During January and February 1967, Bream participated in operations along the coast of Southern California. On 3 March 1967, she embarked on an extended training cruise which included a port visit at Acapulco, Mexico. She returned to San Diego on 25 March 1967 and commenced preparations to deploy to the western Pacific. In April 1967, she entered the Hunters Point Naval Shipyard for drydocking and repairs. She then returned to San Diego to complete her preparations. On 9 June 1967, she got underway for the Far East. During this cruise, she visited Hong Kong; Songkhla and Bangkok, Thailand; Subic Bay and Cebu City in the Philippines; Keelung and Kaohsiung, Taiwan; Chinhae, South Korea; and Sasebo and Yokosuka, Japan. She provided services to the Republic of Korea Navy and the Republic of China Navy and carrying out assigned duties with the U.S. Seventh Fleet.

Bream departed Yokosuka on 3 December 1967 and proceeded directly to San Diego. She arrived there on 19 December 1967 and began a Christmas holiday leave and upkeep period. During January 1968, she operated off the coast of Southern California. On 6 February 1968, she proceedeed to the Mare Island Naval Shipyard to be drydocked for repairs. She returned to service on 21 March 1968 and once again operated along the coast of Southern California. She departed San Diego on 16 October 1968 to carry out another tour of duty in the Far East.

In addition to her duties with the U.S. Seventh Fleet, Bream provided services to the Philippine Navy and the Republic of China Navy. During her deployment, she visited Hong Kong; Subic Bay and Manila in the Philippines; Kaohsiung, Taiwan; and Yokosuka, Japan. She left Yokosuka on 21 February 1969 and proceeded to San Diego, where she arrived on 12 March 1969 After leave and upkeep, she took up local operations once more along the coast of Southern California.

== Decommissioning and disposal ==
Preparations to deactivate Bream began in mid-1969. On 28 June 1969, Bream was decommissioned at Mare Island Naval Shipyard, and her name was struck from the Navy list the same day. She was sunk as a target by the submarine USS Sculpin (SSN-590) on 7 November 1969.

== Honors and awards ==
- Asiatic-Pacific Campaign Medal with four battle stars for World War II service.
- Vietnam Service Medal with three battle stars for Vietnam War service
