= Barracuda-class submarine =

Barracuda class may refer to one of several classes of submarine:

- French Barracuda-class submarine, a French nuclear attack submarine commissioned in 2020
- Sierra-class submarine also known as the Project 945-class submarine, a Soviet nuclear attack submarine
- United States Barracuda-class submarine (1919), a three-boat class that formed a part of the United States Navy's V-boats; the first class of V-boats authorized
- United States Barracuda-class submarine (1951), a three-boat class built as prototype hunter-killer submarines
