= USS Barracuda =

USS Barracuda may refer to more than one United States Navy ship:

- USS Barracuda was the original name of a submarine renamed USS F-2 (SS-21) in 1911 while under construction
- Barracuda (SP-23), a proposed patrol boat inspected for possible service in late 1916 or early 1917 which never entered U.S. Navy service
- USS Barracuda (SP-845), a patrol boat in commission from 1917 to 1919
- USS Barracuda (SS-163), originally named USS V-1 when she was launched in 1924, a submarine in commission from 1924 to 1937 and from 1940 to 1945
- USS Barracuda (SSK-1), later SST-3, originally named USS K-1 when she was launched in 1951, a submarine in commission from 1951 to 1959.

== See also ==
- A fictitious Cold War U.S. Navy submarine named USS Barracuda (SSN-593) appears in the 1986 novel To Kill the Potemkin by Mark Joseph
