= Cuda =

Cuda or CUDA may refer to:

== People ==
- Emilce Cuda (born 1965), Argentine theologian, university professor, and Roman Curia official
- Milan Čuda (1939–2025), Czech volleyball player
- Cuda, the possible original form of the name of Vandal nobleman Godas (died 533)

== Other uses ==
- CUDA, a parallel programming framework by Nvidia
- Barracuda Networks (NYSE ticker symbol CUDA), an American computer security and data storage company
- Cuda, a Celtic/Brythonic goddess residing in what is now the Cotswolds

== See also ==
- Plymouth Barracuda, an automobile
- Barracuda (disambiguation)
