= USS Bluegill =

Submarine of the United States

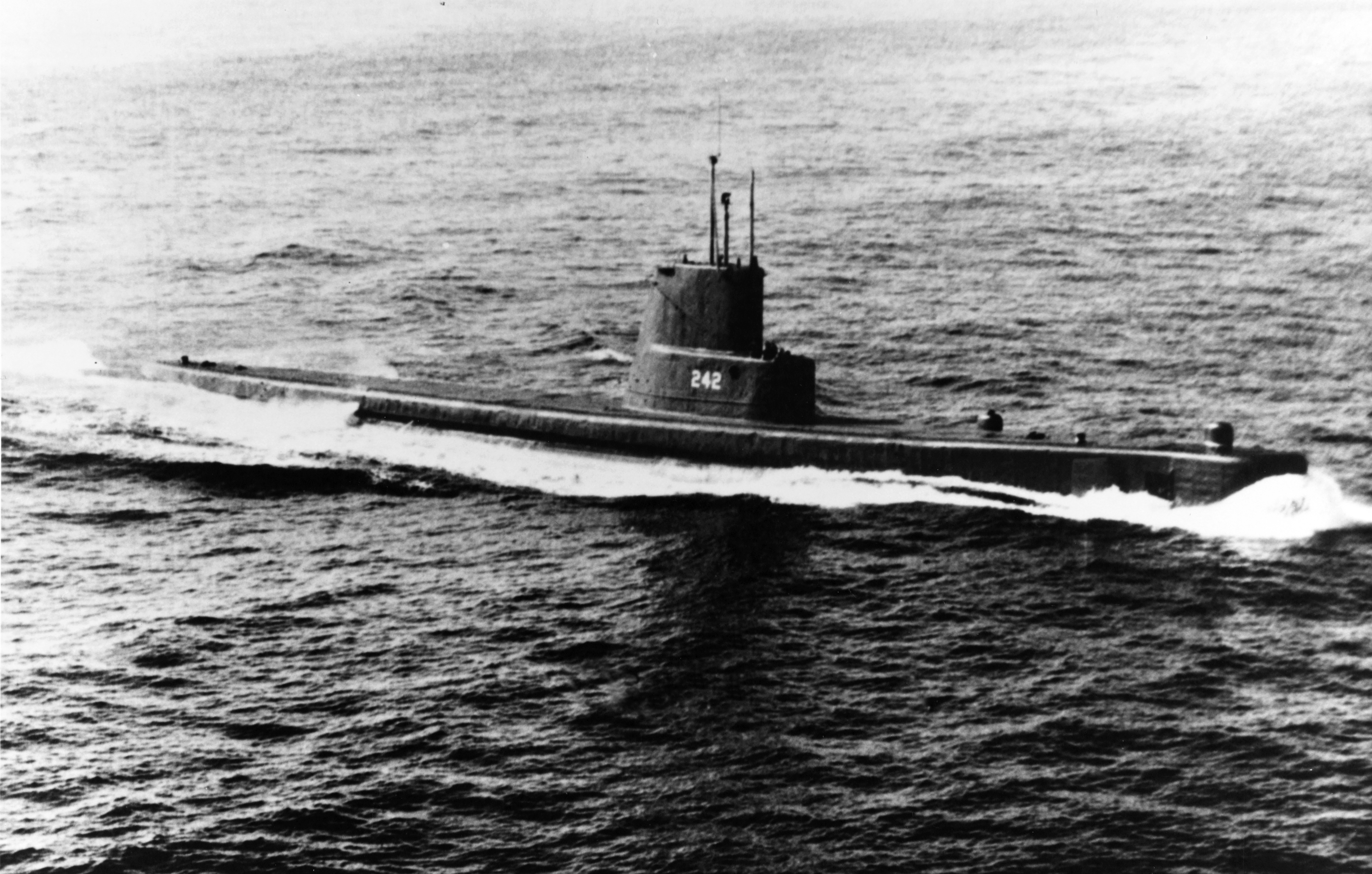
- USS Bluegill (SSK-242) underway during the 1950s.

History

United States
- Name: USS Bluegill (SS-242)
- Ordered: Bluegill
- Builder: Electric Boat Company, Groton, Connecticut
- Laid down: 7 December 1942
- Launched: 8 August 1943
- Sponsored by: Mrs. W. Sterling Cole
- Commissioned: 11 November 1943
- Decommissioned: 1 March 1946
- Recommissioned: 3 May 1951
- Decommissioned: 7 July 1952
- Reclassified: Hunter-killer submarine (SSK-242) 7 July 1952
- Recommissioned: 2 May 1953
- Reclassified: Attack submarine (SS-242) 10 August 1959
- Reclassified: Auxiliary submarine (AGSS-242) 1 April 1966
- Decommissioned: 28 June 1969
- Stricken: 28 June 1969
- Fate: Scuttled 3 December 1970; Refloated November 1983; Scuttled November 1983

General characteristics
- Class & type: Gato-class diesel-electric submarine
- Displacement: 1,525 long tons (1,549 t) surfaced; 2,424 long tons (2,463 t) submerged
- Length: 311 ft 9 in (95.02 m)
- Beam: 27 ft 3 in (8.31 m)
- Draft: 17 ft (5.2 m) maximum
- Propulsion: 4 × General Motors Model 16-248 V16 Diesel engines driving electric generators; 2 × 126-cell Sargo batteries; 4 × high-speed General Electric electric motors with reduction gears; two propellers; 5,400 shp (4.0 MW) surfaced; 2,740 shp (2.0 MW) submerged
- Speed: 21 knots (39 km/h) surfaced; 9 kn (17 km/h) submerged
- Range: 11,000 nmi (20,000 km) surfaced at 10 kn (19 km/h)
- Endurance: 48 hours at 2 knots (4 km/h) submerged; 75 days on patrol
- Test depth: 300 ft (90 m)
- Complement: 6 officers, 54 enlisted
- Armament: 10 × 21-inch (533 mm) torpedo tubes; 6 forward, 4 aft; 24 torpedoes; 1 × 3-inch (76 mm) / 50 caliber deck gun; Bofors 40 mm and Oerlikon 20 mm cannon

USS Bluegill (SS-242/SSK-242) was a Gato-class submarine in commission in the United States Navy from 1943 to 1946, from 1951 to 1952, and from 1953 to 1969. She was named for the bluegill, a sunfish of the Mississippi Valley.

During World War II, Bluegill completed six war patrols between 1 April 1944 and 21 June 1945, operating in an area extending from New Guinea to Formosa and in the South China Sea and Java Sea. She sank ten Japanese vessels, totaling 46,212 tons, including the light cruiser Yubari and a submarine chaser. She was placed in reserve in 1946.

Recommissioned in 1951, Bluegill operated as a training submarine until 1952. She then underwent conversion into a "hunter-killer submarine" specialized for antisubmarine warfare, and was recommissioned as such in 1953. After service in the Vietnam War, she was decommissioned in 1969 and sunk in 1971 for use as a salvage trainer. She was refloated and scuttled in 1983.

== Construction and commissioning ==
Bluegill′s keel was laid down by the Electric Boat Company in Groton, Connecticut, on 17 December 1942. She was launched on 8 August 1943, sponsored by Mrs. W. Sterling Cole, wife of Congressman W. Sterling Cole of New York, and commissioned at Naval Submarine Base New London in Groton on 11 November 1943.

== Service history ==
=== World War II ===
==== November 1943–March 1944 ====
After shakedown training, Bluegill transited the Panama Canal. She departed Balboa in the Panama Canal Zone on 22 February 1944 and set course for the South West Pacific Area. She arrived at Milne Bay on the eastern tip of New Guinea on 22 March 1944.

==== First war patrol ====
On 1 April 1944, Bluegill put to sea from Milne Bay on her first war patrol. She conducted it in the area between northern Halmahera in the Maluku Islands and Sonsorol Island in the Palau Islands. She made her first enemy contact, three Japanese merchant ships, on 10 April 1944 but failed to gain a favorable attack position. On 27 April 1944, with the help of signals intelligence, Bluegill sighted an Imperial Japanese Navy destroyer lying to off Sonsorol Island. While she approached the destroyer, the Japanese 3,500-displacement ton light cruiser Yubari crossed her path. She launched six torpedoes at Yubari, two of which struck home and sent Yubari to the bottom. The Japanese destroyer Samidare then charged in to counterattack. Bluegill responded with four torpedoes from her stern torpedo tubes. All four missed Samidare, and Bluegill went deep to escape.

On 28 April 1944, Bluegill encountered another Japanese destroyer escorting a large landing barge. After gaining a favorable position on the target, she fired a spread of four torpedoes. None hit, the torpedoes apparently running under the target. Again, Bluegill dived and escaped.

On the afternoon of 1 May 1944, Bluegill contacted a Japanese convoy of three merchant ships and two escorts west of the Palau Islands. She set up an ambush ahead of the convoy and, as the Japanese ships passed, fired a spread of four torpedoes, two of which crashed into the side of the 8,812-gross register ton cargo ship Asosan Maru. The escorts counterattacked, but Bluegill escaped. That evening, she surfaced and spied Asosan Maru still afloat and burning furiously. On 2 May 1944, she used her deck gun to finish off Asosan Maru.

On 10 May 1944, Bluegill put into Manus Island in the Admiralty Islands to bring aboard additional torpedoes from the submarine USS Cero (SS-225). The two submarines departed Manus on 11 May, and Bluegill returned to her patrol area near Halmahera and Morotai in the Maluku Islands. On the morning of 19 May, she allowed a Japanese destroyer to pass unmolested in the hope that larger targets might follow, but none materialized.

On 20 May 1944, Bluegill sighted a single Japanese merchant ship rounding a point on Halmahera in company with two escorts. Gaining a favorable firing position to shoreward, she loosed a four-torpedo spread from her stern tubes. Three of the four torpedoes shattered the 1,856-gross register ton cargo ship Miyaura Maru. On 22 May, Bluegill encountered a Japanese convoy that had already been attacked by the submarine USS Ray (SS-271), but two Japanese submarine chasers detected her and dropped a depth-charge barrage close aboard, preventing her from making an attack. While she continued to maneuver for a favorable attack position on the convoy later that day, a Japanese plane forced her to crash-dive and dropped depth charges. Thanks to the crash dive, Bluegill lost contact with the convoy. She left her patrol area on 28 May 1944, stopped at Manus on 1 June, and concluded her patrol with her arrival at Brisbane, Australia, on 7 June 1944.

==== Second war patrol ====
Bluegill embarked upon her second war patrol at the end of June 1944, stopped at Manus on 5 and 6 July, and then got underway for Davao Gulf off Mindanao in the Philippine Islands. On 20 July 1944, she made an unsuccessful attack on a Japanese Nagara-class light cruiser from an extreme range. On 22 July, she sighted a ship of about 1,000 tons, but her spread of four torpedoes ran harmlessly beneath the ship, which responded with 11 depth charges. Off the entrance to Sarangani Bay on 1 August 1944, she encountered a Japanese cargo ship with three escorts. She attained a good firing position, but the escorts detected her and the cargo ship began radical evasive maneuvers. With depth charges coming down around her, Bluegill abandoned her attack and escaped.

While off Maculi Point on Mindanao on 7 August 1944, Bluegill spotted a Japanese cargo ship accompanied by two escorts, a decoy vessel, and three aircraft overhead. She set up on the cargo ship, and two of the four torpedoes that she fired struck home. She was forced deep by a barrage of 36 depth charges. She later learned that her target, the 4,642-gross register ton Sanju Maru, had gone to the bottom.

On 13 August 1944, Bluegill caught sight of a Japanese cargo ship escorted by two torpedo boats, two submarine chasers, and a decoy vessel. She launched a spread of four torpedoes that found two targets, the 300-displacement ton Submarine Chaser No. 12 and the 1,931-gross register ton cargo ship Kojun Maru. At that point, she headed for Australia and, after a stop at Darwin in the Northern Territory, she concluded her patrol with her arrival at Fremantle, Western Australia, on 24 August 1944.

==== Third war patrol ====
Bluegill departed Fremantle on 18 September 1944 to begin her third war patrol, which took her to the Sulu Sea, the Sibuyan Sea, and the South China Sea. On 6 October 1944, she encountered an interisland steamer off Bondoc Point on southern Luzon in the Philippine Islands and riddled it with gunfire. The steamer remained stubbornly afloat at the approach of darkness, so Bluegill was forced to expend a torpedo to sink it.

On 12 October 1944, Bluegill surfaced in the midst of three small Japanese cargo ships of a type known to the Americans as "sea trucks" off Tumao Point on northwestern Mindanao. She opened gunfire on them and soon scored hits on two of the three. However, the sea trucks were armed with heavy machine guns, and when Bluegill′s after 20-millimeter gun jammed, one of the sea trucks took advantage of the opportunity to spray the submarine with machine-gun fire, wounding several of Bluegill′s sailors and prompting Bluegill to break off the action and submerge.

Before dawn on 18 October 1944, Bluegill contacted a Japanese 14-ship convoy while on the surface off Manila on Luzon but could not reach a favorable firing position. After transmitting a contact report, she submerged in the hope of making a daylight attack. The convoy turned away from her, but then made another turn toward Bluegill. In the ensuing combat, Bluegill claimed to have sunk five ships, but a postwar survey of Japanese records credited her with only three: the 9,400-gross register ton transport Arabia Maru, the 1,999-gross register ton cargo ship Chinzei Maru, and the 8,000-gross register ton passenger-cargo ship Hakushika Maru. From time to time throughout the action, Bluegill had to dive to evade depth charges before resuming her attack.

On 20 October 1944, Bluegill expended her remaining torpedoes in an unsuccessful attack on two Japanese tankers escorted by a submarine chaser. On the 21 October, she headed for Mios Woendi in the Schouten Islands off the northwestern coast of New Guinea. She arrived there on 27 October, took aboard torpedoes and fuel, and then returned to sea to resume her patrol in the Sulu Sea. After 20 fruitless days, she departed station to return to her base. Off the coast of Borneo in the Japanese-occupied Netherlands East Indies on 17 November 1944, she encountered a small Japanese transport escorted by three small destroyers. The Japanese detected her, and she dived deeply and began to clear the area. Before escaping, she suffered a pounding from 27 depth charges. Her patrol ended on 25 November 1944 with her arrival at Fremantle, where she began repairs to the damage she suffered in the 17 November depth-charging.

==== Fourth war patrol ====
Repair of her battle damage kept Bluegill in port until she stood out of Fremantle on 19 December 1944 for her fourth war patrol. On the night of 25 December, she attempted a fast surface transit of Lombok Strait between the islands of Bali and Lombok just east of Java, but a Japanese shore battery detected her and opened accurate fire on her, forcing her to make a hasty retreat. She soon joined a coordinated attack group, or "wolfpack," which also included the submarines USS Bream (SS-243) and USS Barbel (SS-316).

During January 1945, Bluegill conducted a reconnaissance in support of the American liberation of the campaign in the Philippine Islands. The only other event of note during the patrol occurred on 2 February 1945, when she took aboard two Japanese prisoners-of-war that another American submarine had captured for passage back to Fremantle, which she reached on 7 February 1945.

==== Fifth war patrol ====
Bluegill began her fifth war patrol on 12 March 1945 and transited Lombok Strait on the night of 18–19 March 1945. Early on 19 March, she made an unsuccessful submerged torpedo attack on an auxiliary sailing vessel and the "sea truck" it was preparing to take in tow. Following fruitless searches along the coast of Borneo, Bluegill arrived off Japanese-occupied French Indochina on 27 March 1945. She submerged off Hon Doi to join the submarines USS Blackfin (SS-322) and USS Blueback (SS-326) in a picket line along the coast.

At around 10:20 on 28 March 1945, Bluegill heard a combination of sonar pings and depth-charge explosions to the south as Blackfin attacked the Japanese convoy HI-88J as it moved up the coast of French Indochina. Bluegill began to edge quietly toward the fracas as the three submarines, in concert with United States Army Air Forces planes, began an onslaught against the convoy. Just before 11:00, Bluegill made contact with the 5,542-gross register ton tanker Honan Maru (formerly the British Royal Fleet Auxiliary tanker War Sirdar) escorted by four coast defense vessels and a destroyer. A little before 11:15, she fired three torpedoes at Honan Maru. Two of them struck home, but Honan Maru managed to ground herself on the nearby shore to avoid sinking and permit salvage. Meanwhile, Bluegill contended with a savage depth charge attack from the escorts. On 29 March, she fired two more torpedoes at the stranded Honan Maru.

On 5 and 6 April 1945, Bluegill attempted a commando raid to blow up bridges and trains in French Indochina. The Japanese detected the Australian commandos, and the attempt ended in failure. Meanwhile, Bluegill returned to Honan Maru on 5 April and sent ashore a landing party that ascertained Honan Maru′s identity and completed her destruction with demolition charges and incendiaries. She concluded her patrol at Subic Bay on Luzon in the Philippine Islands on 18 April 1945.

==== Sixth war patrol ====
Bluegill put to sea from Subic Bay on her sixth war patrol, assigned a patrol area in the South China Sea to the southwest of Formosa. She sighted no enemy shipping during her patrol. On 28 May 1945, she conducted a reconnaissance and bombardment of Pratas Island. She sent a landing party of 12 men ashore, and they found the island to be uninhabited, discovering that the Japanese naval garrison had recently been evacuated. In a ceremony on 29 May 1945, Bluegill′s crew raised the United States flag on the island and proclaimed it to be "Bluegill Island." They then destroyed a Japanese ammunition and fuel dump on the island. The otherwise uneventful patrol ended at Pearl Harbor, Hawaii, on 21 June 1945.

==== End of war ====
Later in June 1945, Bluegill headed for San Francisco, California, where she arrived on 2 July 1945 and soon began an overhaul at the Bethlehem Steel Company shipyard. While she was undergoing overhaul, World War II ended with the cessation of hostilities with Japan on 15 August 1945 (14 August on the other side of the International Date Line in San Francisco).

=== Post-World War II ===
==== 1945–1946 ====
Upon completion of her overhaul, Buegill served in the United States Pacific Fleet until 1 March 1946, when she was decommissioned and placed in reserve at Mare Island Naval Shipyard on Mare Island in Vallejo, California.

==== 1951–1953 ====
Bluegill remained in reserve at Mare Island until the spring of 1951. As part of the fleet build-up that occurred following the outbreak of the Korean War on 25 June 1950, she was recommissioned on 3 May 1951 and reported to the U.S. Pacific Fleet for service as a training submarine, based at San Diego, California. On 7 July 1952, she was decommissioned at Hunters Point Naval Shipyard in San Francisco, placed in reserve, and redesignated a "hunter-killer submarine" — U.S. Navy terminology at the time for a specialized antisubmarine warfare submarine — with the hull classification symbol SSK-242. After conversion at Hunters Point for her new role, she was recommissioned at San Francisco on 2 May 1953.

==== 1953–1969 ====
Bluegill resumed duty based at San Diego until 2 November 1953, when she deployed to the western Pacific. During her deployment, she trained with units of the United States Seventh Fleet, saw service off the Korean Peninsula, and visited various Far Eastern ports before returning to San Diego on 15 May 1954. There, she resumed operations along the United States West Coast and continued such duty until Decebmber 1955.

In December 1955, Bluegill moved to a new home port at Pearl Harbor, Hawaii. For almost nine years, she alternated between operations in the Hawaiian Islands with deployments to the western Pacific. On 15 August 1959, she was redesignated an attack submarine with the hull classification symbol SS-242.

While Bluegill was undergoing overhaul at the Mare Island Naval Shipyard on 1 April 1964, while in overhaul, her home port changed to San Diego. For the remainder of her career, she divided her time between training duties along the U.S. West Coast and periodic cruises to the Far East. During the Vietnam War, she spent time in the Gulf of Tonkin off North Vietnam in 1965, conducting reconnaissance operations and rescuing downed American pilots. She received her last designation change on 1 April 1966, when she became an auxiliary submarine with the hull classification symbol AGSS-242.

== Disposal ==
Bluegill was decommissioned at San Diego on 28 June 1969, and her name was struck from the Navy Vessel Register the same day. In 1970, she was towed to Pearl Harbor. On 3 December 1970, she was scuttled and moored to the sea bed as a salvage trainer about 2 kilometers (1.1 nmi; 1.2 mi) off Lahaina, Maui, Hawaii, in 40 meters (131 ft) of water. Her hull was used thereafter for underwater rescue training until 1983.

On 5 November 1983, after a month of preparatory work, the Edenton-class salvage and rescue ships USS Beaufort (ATS-2) and USS Brunswick (ATS-3) raised Bluegill and towed her to deep water, where she was scuttled with military honors on 6 November 1983 as a means of disposal.

== Awards ==
- Navy Unit Commendation for her first war patrol, during which she sank Yubari
- Asiatic-Pacific Campaign Medal with four battle stars for World War II service
- Korean Service Medal
- Vietnam Service Medal with four battle stars for Vietnam War service
