= USS Bass (SSK-2) =

Barracuda-class submarine of the US Navy

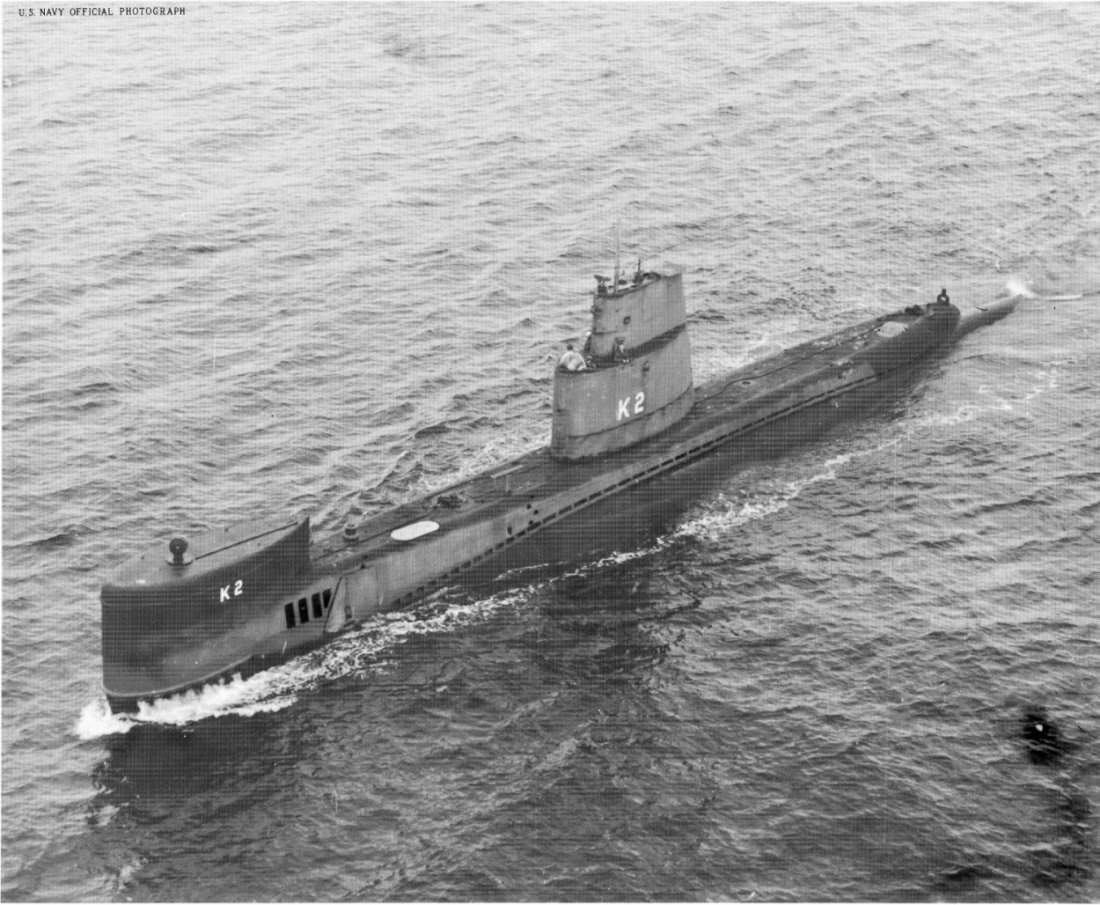

History

United States
- Name: USS Bass
- Namesake: The barracuda, a large, voracious fish
- Builder: Mare Island Naval Shipyard
- Laid down: 23 February 1950
- Launched: 2 May 1951
- Commissioned: 16 November 1951
- Decommissioned: 1 October 1957
- Stricken: 1 April 1965
- Fate: Sold for scrap, 17 November 1966

General characteristics
- Class & type: Barracuda-class diesel-electric Hunter-killer submarine
- Displacement: 765 tons (777 t) surfaced; 1,160 tons (1179 t) submerged
- Length: 196 ft 1 in (59.77 m) overall
- Beam: 24 ft 7 in (7.49 m)
- Draft: 14 ft 5 in (4.39 m) mean
- Propulsion: 3 × General Motors 8-268A diesel engines, total 1,050 shp (780 kW); 2 × General Electric electric motors; 1 × 126-cell battery; 2 shafts
- Speed: 13 knots (24 km/h) surfaced; 8.5 knots (16 km/h) submerged
- Range: 9,000 nautical miles (17,000 km)
- Test depth: 400 ft (120 m)
- Complement: 37 officers and men
- Armament: 4 × 21 inch (533 mm) torpedo tubes

USS Bass (SSK-2/SS-551), a Barracuda-class submarine, was the second ship of the United States Navy to be named for the bass, an edible, spiny-finned fish. She was originally named USS K-2 (SSK-2).

Bass was laid down by Mare Island Naval Shipyard. She was launched on 2 May 1951 as K-2 sponsored by Mrs. John J. Crane, widow of Commander Crane, and commissioned on 16 November 1951.

The three SSK boats, Barracuda (SSK-1), Bass (SSK-2), and Bonita (SSK-3), were equipped with the large BQR-4 bow-mounted sonar array as part of Project Kayo, which experimented in the use of passive acoustics with low-frequency bow-mounted sonar arrays. When the boat was rigged for silent running, these arrays gave greatly improved convergence zone detection ranges against snorkeling submarines. The SSKs themselves were limited in their anti-submarine warfare (ASW) abilities by their low speed and their need to snorkel periodically to recharge their batteries, but the advances they pioneered in sonar technology were invaluable to the development of nuclear-powered submarines. The class was developed as mobilization prototypes should large numbers of Soviet submarines based on the Type XXI U-boat appear.

K-2 arrived at Pearl Harbor on 23 May 1952 to join Submarine Division 72. Since she was a new type of submarine, she engaged in special evaluation operations to determine her capabilities and limitations. In January 1953 she underwent restricted availability at Pearl Harbor Naval Shipyard for the installation of additional equipment. In June 1953 she resumed operations and engaged in developing tactics and coordinated operations with other fleet units.

In January 1955, K-2 returned to Mare Island Naval Shipyard for overhaul. After this she cruised to Mazatlán, Mexico, before returning to Pearl Harbor. She was renamed Bass on 15 December 1955. Bass operated out of Pearl Harbor until June 1957. On 26 June 1957 she returned to the United States and operated along the West Coast until going out of commission in reserve 1 October 1957. In 1958, the Soviet threat changed from conventional to nuclear-powered submarines, and the SSK force was withdrawn from the SSK role and redesignated. Her hull classification symbol was changed to SS-551 on 15 August 1959.

== Fate ==
USS Bass was struck from the Naval Vessel Register in 1965, and was sold for scrap on 17 November 1966.
