= HMS Barracouta =

Six ships of the Royal Navy have borne the name HMS Barracouta, after the fish Thyrsites atun. Another was renamed before being launched:

- HMS Barracouta (1782) was a 14-gun sloop, previously a cutter. She was purchased in 1782 and sold in 1792. She became the privateer cutter Thought, which the French captured in 1793. She became a French privateer and sailed under various names until captured as Vedette in 1800. The Royal Navy took her into service as HMS Vidette, but sold her in 1802, never having commissioned her.
- HMS Barracouta (1804) was a 4-gun schooner launched in 1804 and wrecked in 1805.
- HMS Barracouta (1807) was a Cruizer-class brig-sloop launched in 1807 and sold in 1815.
- HMS Barracouta (1820) was a 10-gun Cherokee-class brig-sloop launched in 1820. She was commissioned as a Falmouth packet in 1829 and was sold in 1836.
- HMS Barracouta (1851) was a wooden paddle sloop launched in 1851 and broken up in 1881.
- HMS Barracouta (1889) was a third class cruiser launched in 1889 and sold in 1905.
- HMS Barracouta was to have been a Bulldog-class survey vessel, but she was renamed HMS Beagle before being launched in 1967.
