= USS Barracuda (SP-845) =

Patrol vessel of the United States Navy

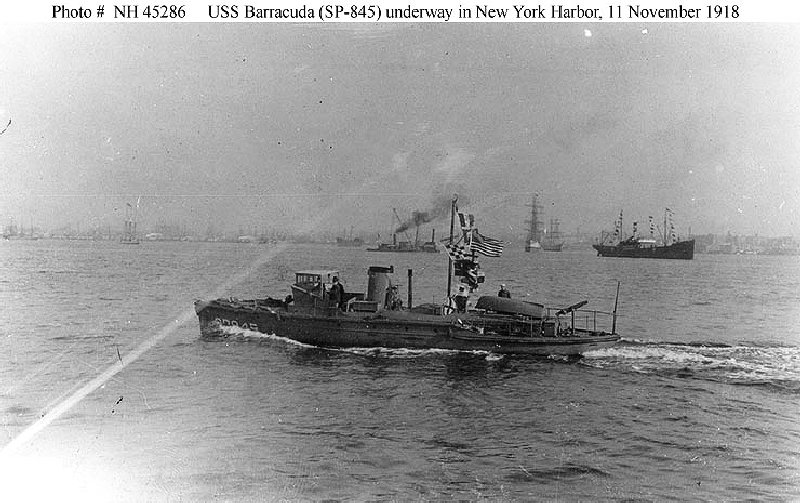
- Barracuda flying signal flags and the National Ensign in New York Harbor on 11 November 1918 to celebrate that day's Armistice with Germany ending World War I

History

United States
- Name: USS Barracuda
- Namesake: The barracuda, any of several large, voracious fishes of warm oceans related to the gray mullets (previous name retained)
- Builder: James E. Graves, Marblehead, Massachusetts
- Completed: 1912
- Acquired: 18 June 1917
- Commissioned: 31 October 1917
- Decommissioned: 13 February 1919
- Fate: Returned to owner 1919
- Notes: Operated as private motorboat Barracuda 1912-1917 and from 1919

General characteristics
- Type: Patrol vessel
- Tonnage: 30 tons
- Length: 60 ft 0 in (18.29 m)
- Beam: 11 ft 0 in (3.35 m)
- Draft: 3 ft 6 in (1.07 m) mean
- Speed: 15 knots
- Complement: 8
- Armament: 1 × 1-pounder gun; 1 × machine gun

Note: This ship should not be confused with the motorboat Barracuda, considered for service as patrol boat USS Barracuda (SP-23) during the same era.

USS Barracuda (SP-845) was an armed motorboat that served in the United States Navy as a patrol vessel from 1917 to 1919.

Barracuda was built in 1912 by James E. Graves at Marblehead, Massachusetts, as a private motorboat of the same name. The U.S. Navy acquired her from her owner, Mr. R. W. McEwan on a free lease on 18 June 1917 for World War I service. She was commissioned as USS Barracuda (SP-845) on 31 October 1917.

Assigned to the section patrol in the 3rd Naval District, Barracuda spent her entire naval career patrolling the waters in and around New York Harbor.

Decommissioned on 13 February 1919, Barracuda was returned to her owner.
