= USS Barracuda (SSK-1) =

Barracuda-class submarine of the US Navy

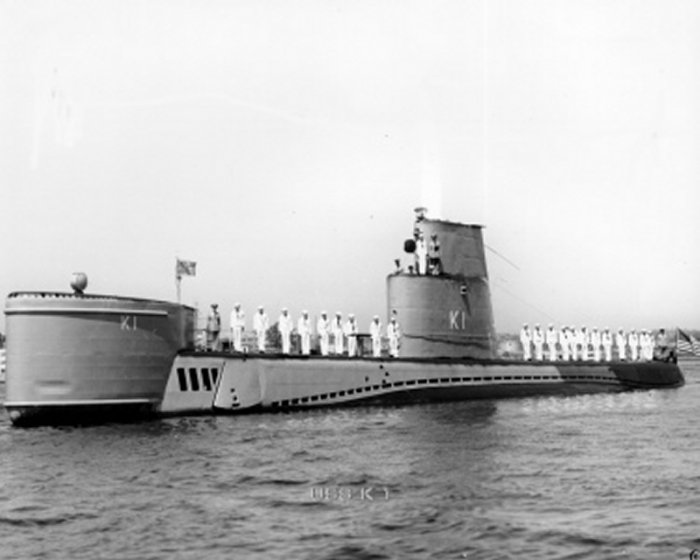

History

United States
- Name: USS Barracuda
- Builder: Electric Boat Company, Groton, Connecticut
- Laid down: 1 July 1949
- Launched: 2 March 1951
- Commissioned: 10 November 1951
- Decommissioned: 1 October 1973
- Stricken: 1 October 1973
- Fate: Sold for scrap, 21 March 1974

General characteristics
- Class & type: Barracuda-class diesel-electric Hunter-killer submarine
- Displacement: 765 tons (777 t) surfaced; 1,160 tons (1179 t) submerged
- Length: 196 ft 1 in (59.77 m) overall
- Beam: 24 ft 7 in (7.49 m)
- Draft: 14 ft 5 in (4.39 m) mean
- Propulsion: 3 × General Motors 8-268A diesel engines, total 1,050 shp (780 kW); 2 × General Electric electric motors; 1 × 126-cell battery; 2 shafts
- Speed: 13 knots (24 km/h) surfaced; 8.5 knots (16 km/h) submerged
- Range: 9,000 nautical miles (17,000 km)
- Test depth: 400 ft (120 m)
- Complement: 37 officers and men
- Armament: 4 × 21 inch (533 mm) torpedo tubes

USS Barracuda (SSK-1/SST-3/SS-550) (originally USS K-1 (SSK-1)), the lead ship of her class, was a submarine that was the third ship of the United States Navy to be named for the barracuda, a voracious, pike-like fish. Her keel was laid down on 1 July 1949 by the Electric Boat Division of General Dynamics Corporation in Groton, Connecticut. She was launched on 2 March 1951 as K-1, sponsored by Mrs. Willis Manning Thomas (her late husband died as commanding officer of USS Pompano (SS-181)), and commissioned on 10 November 1951. Notably, future President of the United States Jimmy Carter served as an officer on K-1 as part of its pre-commissioning crew and during its first year of active service until he was reassigned on 16 October 1952.

The three SSK boats, Barracuda (SSK-1), Bass (SSK-2), and Bonita (SSK-3), were equipped with the large BQR-4 bow-mounted sonar array as part of Project Kayo, which experimented with the use of passive acoustics via low-frequency bow-mounted sonar arrays. When the boat was rigged for silent running, these arrays gave greatly improved convergence zone detection ranges against snorkeling submarines. The SSKs themselves were limited in their anti-submarine warfare capabilities by their low speed and their need to snorkel periodically, but the advances in sonar technology they pioneered were invaluable to later nuclear-powered submarines. The class was developed as mobilization prototypes should large numbers of Soviet submarines based on the Type XXI U-boat appear.

Barracuda joined Submarine Development Group 2, which was stationed at her home port of New London, Connecticut. She cruised along the Atlantic coast of the United States and Canada, in the Caribbean Sea, and made a voyage to Greenock and Rothesay, Scotland, in June 1955. On 15 December 1955 her name was changed from K-1 to Barracuda (SSK-1). During intervals between and after these cruises, Barracuda operated along the eastern seaboard carrying out training and experimental exercises.

== Redesignation and service as training submarine ==
In 1958, the Soviet threat changed from conventional to nuclear-powered submarines, and the SSK force was withdrawn from the SSK role and redesignated. Barracuda was redesignated SST-3 on 15 July 1959 and operated for the next several years out of Charleston, South Carolina and Key West, Florida. Barracuda was overhauled from 1963 to 1964 at Norfolk, Virginia. Her distinctive forward sonar array was removed and replaced with a streamlined bow at the submarine base in Key West Naval Base alongside USS Bushnell – similar to submarines converted to GUPPY configurations. In 1965 she conducted training operations out of Key West.

In 1968 she was transferred to Charleston, South Carolina and served as a training platform for junior officers and enlisted personnel. On 1 August 1972 she was redesignated as SS-T3. Although, based on redesignation of her sisters as SS-551 and SS-552, the hull number SS-550 was probably reserved for her, she never officially held this designation.

== Fate ==
Barracuda was decommissioned on 1 October 1973 at Charleston and was stricken on the same day. She was scrapped between 8 April and 8 July 1974 near Charleston, South Carolina.
