= United States Barracuda-class submarine (1951) =

Class of prototype hunter-killer submarines

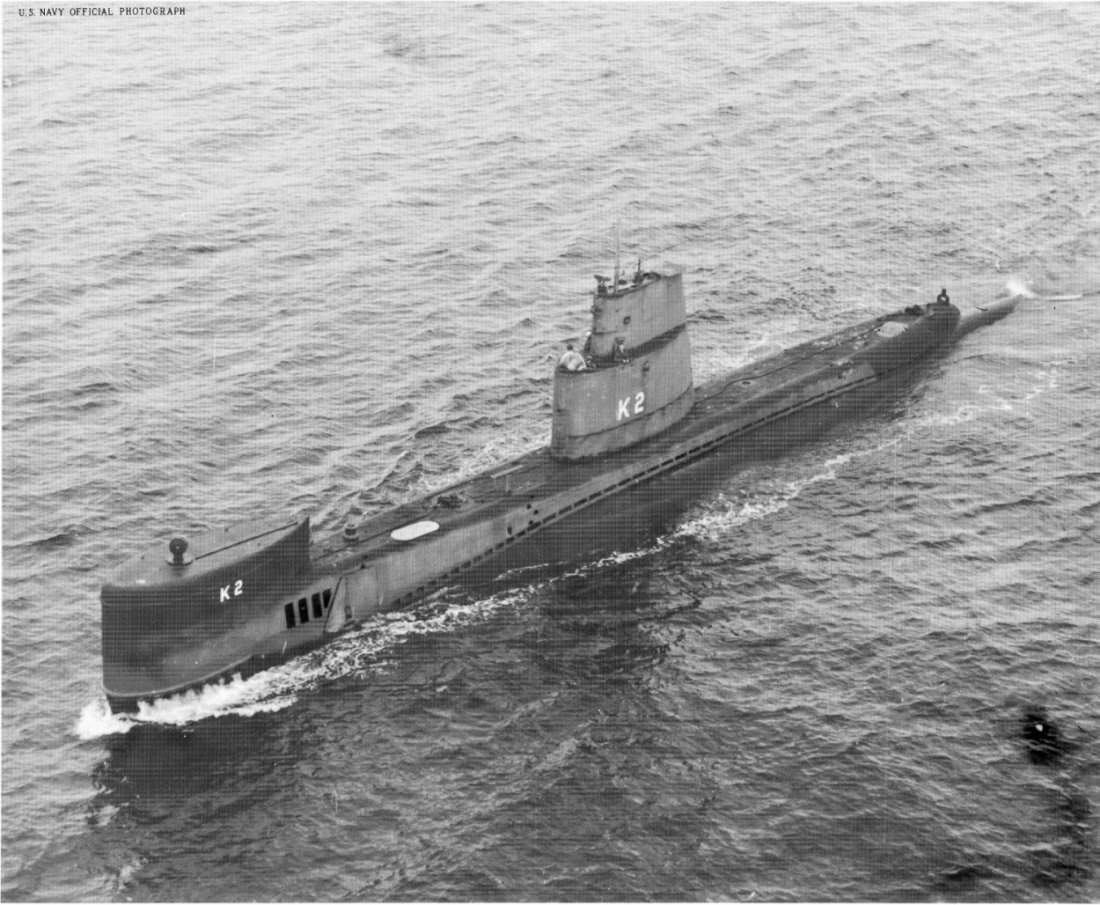
- USS Bass

Class overview
- Builders: Electric Boat Company, Groton, Connecticut (Barracuda); Mare Island Naval Shipyard (Bonita & Bass)
- Operators: United States Navy
- Preceded by: Tench class
- Succeeded by: Tang class
- Built: 1949–1951
- In commission: 1951–1959
- Completed: 3
- Scrapped: 3

General characteristics
- Type: Diesel-electric hunter-killer submarine
- Displacement: 765 long tons (777 t) surfaced; 1,160 long tons (1,180 t) submerged
- Length: 196 ft 1 in (59.77 m) overall
- Beam: 24 ft 7 in (7.49 m)
- Draft: 14 ft 5 in (4.39 m) mean
- Propulsion: 3 × General Motors 8-268A diesel engines, total 1,050 shp (780 kW); 2 × General Electric electric motors; 1 × 126-cell battery; 2 shafts
- Speed: 13 knots (24 km/h) surfaced; 8.5 knots (15.7 km/h) submerged
- Range: 9,000 nautical miles (17,000 km)
- Test depth: 400 ft (120 m)
- Complement: 37 officers and men
- Armament: 4 × 21-inch (533 mm) torpedo tubes (bow)

The Barracuda-class submarines (originally the K-1-class submarines) were the product of Project Kayo, a research and development effort begun immediately after World War II by the United States Navy to "solve the problem of using submarines to attack and destroy enemy submarines". They originally had the hull classification symbol SSK, for "hunter-killer submarine".

These submarines were originally named K-1 through K-3, with hull numbers SSK-1 through SSK-3. They were renamed Barracuda, Bass, and Bonita in December 1955. In 1959 Barracuda was redesignated SST-3 (SST for training submarine), and in 1964 her main sonar was removed. A final redesignation twist was SS-T3 in 1973; for some reason the Navy wished to list her as an attack submarine. Bass was decommissioned in 1957 and redesignated SS-551 in 1959. Bonita was decommissioned in 1958 and redesignated SS-552 in 1959.

== Background ==
It was known that the Soviet Navy had acquired the German Type XXI U-boat and other advanced submarines, and was expected to rapidly put derivatives of them into production. In 1948, the US Navy prepared estimates of the number of anti-submarine warfare (ASW)-capable submarines (SSKs) that would be needed to counter the hundreds of advanced Soviet submarines that were expected to be in service by 1960. Two scenarios were considered: a reasonable scenario assuming the Soviets would build to their existing force level of about 360 submarines, and a "nightmare" scenario projecting that the Soviets could build submarines as fast as the Germans had built U-boats, with a force level of 2,000 submarines. The projected US SSK force levels for these scenarios were 250 for the former and 970 for the latter. By comparison, the total US submarine force at the end of World War II, excluding obsolescent training submarines, was just over 200 boats.

== Design ==
The Barracuda-class SSKs were designed to be smaller than contemporary attack submarines and simpler in design and construction. It was hoped that this would allow them to be cheaply mass-produced in the large numbers it was thought would be needed to combat the growing Soviet Type XXI-derived submarine fleet. It was also thought that this would allow shipyards without submarine experience, and aircraft contractors with experience in the mass production of large complex aircraft, to build these submarines.

The primary innovation created by Kayo was a low-frequency passive bow sonar system, the BQR-4, which was originally to be wrapped around the submarine's conning tower. Testing on Grampus showed that self-noise would greatly reduce detection range, and the sonar was relocated to the bow. Due to the large sonar dome above the torpedo tubes, in the Barracuda-class the torpedo tubes remained in their traditional bow position.

== Service ==
In 1951–53, the Barracudas were joined by seven converted Gato-class SSKs. These lost four of their six bow torpedo tubes and two of their four main diesel engines.

The advent of nuclear power, with USS Nautilus (SSN-571) entering service in 1955 and the Soviet Navy responding with the first November-class submarine only three years later, created a revolution in ASW. Nuclear submarines could maintain a high speed at deep depths indefinitely. The conventional SSKs would be useless against nuclear-powered boats, except possibly in shallow water. As nuclear attack submarines were developed and deployed, they took up the ASW mission. All ten SSKs were redesignated and decommissioned or reassigned to other duties in 1957–59.

The SSK program and particularly the Barracuda class were thus overtaken by events after a few years' service. Their sonar, however, proved excellent, with good convergence zone detection ranges against snorkeling submarines; it was retained on the former Gato-class SSKs and fitted on the first nuclear submarines and a few additional diesel submarines. The bow sonar array eventually became a bow sonar sphere, with angled, amidships torpedo tubes to make room for it in the Thresher class and all subsequent US SSN classes.

In 1958, Bonita was used as a nuclear weapons testing target at Eniwetok in the South Pacific, part of Operation Hardtack I. This was designed as shock testing rather than destructive testing, and damage was light except to electronics.

== Boats in class ==
Name and hull number as built	Builder	Laid Down	Launched	Commissioned	Decommissioned	Period of service	Name in 1955	Hull number in 1959	Fate
USS K-1 (SSK-1)	Electric Boat	1 July 1949	2 March 1951	10 November 1951	1 October 1973	21.9	Barracuda	SST-3	Scrapped 1974
USS K-2 (SSK-2)	Mare Island Naval Shipyard	23 February 1950	2 May 1951	16 November 1951	1 October 1957	5.8	Bass	SS-551	Scrapped 1966
USS K-3 (SSK-3)	Mare Island Naval Shipyard	19 May 1950	21 June 1951	11 January 1952	7 November 1958	6.8	Bonita	SS-552	Scrapped 1966

== See also ==
- Media related to United States Barracuda class submarines (1951) at Wikimedia Commons
