= USS Bogue =

Bogue-class American escort aircraft carrier

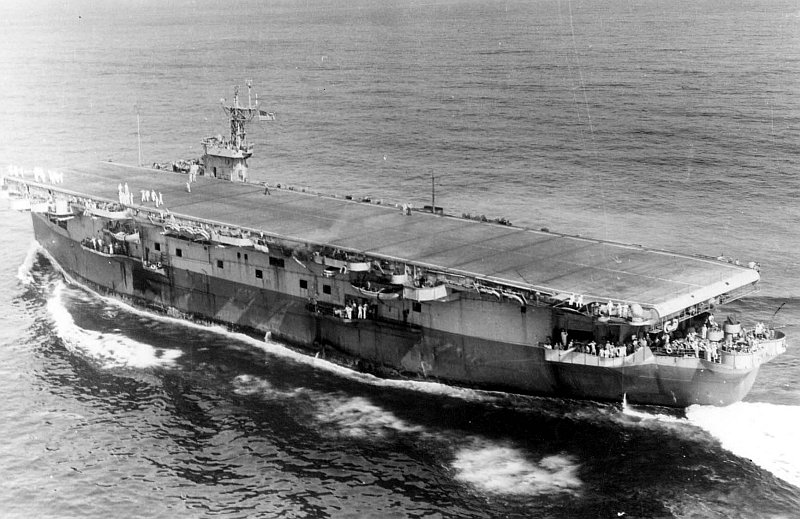
- USS Bogue (CVE-9), near Norfolk, Virginia on 20 June 1943

History

United States
- Name: Steel Advocate
- Owner: War Shipping Administration (WSA)
- Operator: Isthmian Steamship Company
- Ordered: as type (C3-S-A1 hull), MC hull 170
- Awarded: 30 September 1940
- Builder: Seattle-Tacoma Shipbuilding Corporation, Tacoma, Washington
- Cost: $3,733,124
- Yard number: 9
- Way number: 1
- Laid down: 1 October 1941
- Launched: 15 January 1942
- Fate: Allocated to the United States Navy, 1 May 1942

United States
- Name: Bogue
- Namesake: Bogue Sound, North Carolina
- Acquired: 1 May 1942
- Commissioned: 26 September 1942
- Decommissioned: 30 November 1946
- Reclassified: ACV, 20 August 1942; CVE, 15 July 1943; CVHE, 12 June 1955
- Stricken: 1 March 1959
- Identification: Hull symbol: AVG-9; ACV-9; CVE-9; CVHE-9; Code letters: NENI
- Honors and awards: 3 × battle stars; Presidential Unit Citation
- Fate: Scrapped, 1960

General characteristics
- Class & type: Bogue-class escort carrier
- Displacement: 8,390 long tons (8,520 t) (standard); 13,980 long tons (14,200 t) (full load)
- Length: 465 ft (142 m) (wl); 495 ft 8 in (151.08 m) (oa); 440 ft (130 m) (fd)
- Beam: 69 ft 6 in (21.18 m) wl; 82 ft (25 m) (fd); 111 ft 6 in (33.99 m) (extreme width)
- Draft: 23 ft 3 in (7.09 m) (mean); 26 ft (7.9 m) (max)
- Installed power: 2 × Foster-Wheeler 285 psi (1,970 kPa) boilers; 8,500 shp (6,300 kW)
- Propulsion: 1 × Allis-Chalmers steam turbine; 1 × Screw
- Speed: 18 kn (33 km/h; 21 mph)
- Complement: 890 officers and enlisted
- Armament: As designed: 2 × 5 in (127 mm)/51 caliber; 10 × 20 mm (0.79 in) Oerlikon anti-aircraft cannons; Varied, ultimate armament: 2 × 5 in (127 mm)/38 cal dual-purpose gun (DP); 8 × twin 40 mm (1.57 in) Bofors anti-aircraft guns; 20 × 20 mm Oerlikon anti-aircraft cannons
- Aircraft carried: 19-24
- Aviation facilities: 1 × hydraulic catapult; 2 × elevators

USS Bogue (AVG/ACV/CVE/CVHE-9) was the lead ship in the Bogue class of escort carriers in the United States Navy during World War II. The ship was named for Bogue Sound in North Carolina.

Originally classified AVG-9, this was changed to ACV-9 on 20 August 1942; CVE-9 on 15 July 1943 and CVHE-9, on 12 June 1955. She was part of an effective force, where aircraft operating from Bogue or ships escorting the carrier claimed ten German and two Japanese submarines between May 1943 and July 1945.

== Construction ==
Bogue was laid down on 1 October 1941, as Steel Advocate under Maritime Commission contract, MC hull #170, by Seattle-Tacoma Shipbuilding, in Tacoma, Washington. She was launched on 15 January 1942 sponsored by Mrs W. Miller, the wife of Lieutenant Commander Miller, transferred to the United States Navy on the 1 May 1942 and commissioned on the 26 September 1942.

== Aircraft carried ==
Bogue had capacity for up to 24 fighter and anti-submarine aircraft normally a mixture of Grumman; Wildcat and Avengers with composition dependent upon mission. The squadron had the callsign VC-9 (Composite Squadron Nine). When she was utilised in a ferry role, she could carry up to 90 aircraft depending on aircraft type.

== Service history ==
After a shakedown cruise and repair period, Bogue joined the Atlantic Fleet in February 1943. Although she escorted convoys early in her career, she served principally as the nucleus of independent, highly successful anti-submarine hunter-killer groups for Atlantic theater carrier operations.

=== 1943 ===
During March and April, she made three North Atlantic crossings, departing on her fourth crossing on 22 April. On 21 May, her Avengers damaged German submarine U-231 and the resulting chlorine gas leak knocked out both of the boat's radio transmitters forcing the boat to return to La Pallice in occupied France.

Bogue claimed her first kill on 22 May, when depth charges dropped by one of her Avengers damaged U-569 at 50°40′N 35°21′W. The U-boat captain ordered his crew to scuttle the boat and 24 of the crew were later captured by the Canadian destroyer St. Laurent.

On 5 June, U-217 was sunk at 30°18′N 42°50′W with all hands by depth charges dropped by Bogue's Avengers near the Mid-Atlantic Ridge.

On 12 June, the already damaged U-118 was sunk by aircraft from Bogue with bombs and gunfire, at 30°49′N 33°49′W 16 of the boat's crew were picked up by the escort vessel USS Osmond Ingram.

On 23 July, during her seventh patrol, her aircraft sank U-527 at 35°25′N 27°56′W. Twelve survivors were picked up by USS Clemson and later transferred to Bogue. The destroyer George E. Badger, part of Bogue's escort screen, sank U-613 at 35°32′N 28°36′W, while she was en route to lay mines off the coast of Jacksonville, Florida.

Bogue's eighth patrol. On 30 November, aircraft from Bogue damaged U-238 east of the Azores with rockets that killed two crew members and wounded five more, prompting the submarine to return to Brest with damage that put the boat out of service for a month.

On 12 December, U-172 was sunk on 13 December, in mid-Atlantic west of the Canary Islands by Avenger and Wildcat aircraft and attacks from the destroyers George E. Badger, Clemson, Osmond Ingram and Du Pont (DD-152). The battle between U-172 and the ships and aircraft lasted for 27 hours. U-172 sank at 26°19′N 29°58′W., thirteen of U-172's crew were killed and 46 survived.

=== 1944 ===
Bogue had a break from her anti-submarine operations during January and February, when she ferried a cargo of United States Army fighter aircraft to Glasgow.

She then returned to her anti-submarine role. On 13 March, her Avengers, from VC-95, along with British Fortress Mk IIs from 220 Squadron, the destroyers Haverfield and Hobson, and the RCN River-class frigate Prince Rupert collectively sank U-575 at 46°18′N 27°34′W.

On 5 May, Bogue and her escorts departed Hampton Roads, Virginia, for a cruise that netted two more submarines and lasted until 2 July. Francis M. Robinson, of the screen, sank the Japanese submarine RO-501 (ex-German U-1224) on 13 May, and Bogue's Avengers sank the Japanese submarine I-52 at 15°16′N 39°55′W, on 24 June, in a torpedo attack, dropping a Mark 24 "mine". The Mark 24, code-name "Fido" and designated a "mine" for secrecy reasons.

During the next deployment from 24 July to 24 September, Bogue's aircraft sank German submarine, U-1229, on 20 August at 42°20′N 51°39′W.

Following her return in September, Bogue operated on training missions out of Bermuda and Quonset Point, Rhode Island.

=== 1945 ===
In February she completed a ferry trip to Liverpool with US Army Aircraft.

In April, Bogue put to sea again as an anti-submarine vessel, forming part of Captain George J. Dufek's Second Barrier Force during Operation Teardrop. On 24 April, her escort Frederick C. Davis was torpedoed and sunk by U-546. Bogue's accompanying escorts, Flaherty, Neunzer, Chatelain, Varian, Hubbard, Janssen, Pillsbury and Keith sank U-546 at 43°53′N 40°07′W.

With the war in the Atlantic over, Bogue moved to the Pacific, arriving at San Diego on 3 July. She then steamed westward to Guam, arriving on 24 July, then to Adak, Alaska, from 19 August to 6 September, then joined the "Operation Magic Carpet" fleet returning servicemen from the Pacific islands.

== Post War and decommissioning ==
She was placed out of commission in reserve on 30 November 1946, at Tacoma, Washington and redesignated CVHE-9, on the 12 June 1955 and struck from the Navy list on 1 March 1959.

In 1960, she was sold to the Hyman-Michaels Company, of Chicago, Illinois, and towed from Bremerton to Everett, Washington, for scrapping.

== Awards ==
Bogue received a Presidential Unit Citation and three battle stars for her World War II service.

== Bibliography ==
- Gerhardt, Frank A. "SS Steel Artisan". United States Maritime Commission 1936 thru 1950.
- Cressman, Robert (2000). The official chronology of the U.S. Navy in World War II. Annapolis, Maryland: Naval Institute Press. ISBN 978-1-55750-149-3. This article incorporates text from this source, which is in the public domain.
- "Bogue". DANFS. Navy Department, Naval History and Heritage Command. 30 January 2006. This article incorporates text from this source, which is in the public domain.
- Yarnall, Paul (20 September 2019). "USS BOGUE (ACV-9)". NavSource.
