= USS Neunzer =

WWII US naval vessel

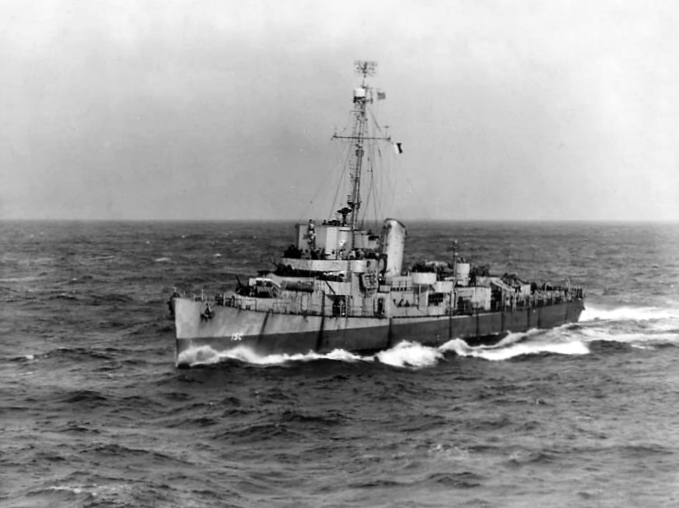

History

United States
- Namesake: Weimar Edmund Neunzer
- Builder: Consolidated Steel Corporation, Orange, Texas
- Laid down: 29 January 1943
- Launched: 27 April 1943
- Commissioned: 27 September 1943
- Decommissioned: January 1947
- Stricken: 1 July 1972
- Fate: Sold 1 November 1973, scrapped

General characteristics
- Class & type: Edsall-class destroyer escort
- Displacement: 1,253 tons standard; 1,590 tons full load
- Length: 306 feet (93.27 m)
- Beam: 36.58 feet (11.15 m)
- Draft: 10.42 full load feet (3.18 m)
- Propulsion: 4 FM diesel engines, 4 diesel-generators, 6,000 shp (4.5 MW), 2 screws
- Speed: 21 knots (39 km/h)
- Range: 9,100 nmi. at 12 knots; (17,000 km at 22 km/h)
- Complement: 8 officers, 201 enlisted
- Armament: 3 × single 3 in (76 mm)/50 guns; 1 × twin 40 mm AA guns; 8 × single 20 mm AA guns; 1 × triple 21 in (533 mm) torpedo tubes; 8 × depth charge projectors; 1 × depth charge projector (hedgehog); 2 × depth charge tracks

USS Neunzer (DE-150) was an Edsall-class destroyer escort in service with the United States Navy from 1943 to 1947. After spending several decades in reserve, she was sold for scrap in 1973.

== Namesake ==
Weimar Edmund Neunzer was born on 31 July 1912 in Lynn, Massachusetts. He enlisted in the Navy on 24 February 1934. In the ensuing years he rose in rank while on USS Portland, USS Chaumont, USS Shaw and USS Reina Mercedes as well as several shore stations. Appointed Machinist 22 April 1942, he served in Patrol Squadron 43 during action against the Japanese in the Aleutian Islands Campaign. He was killed in action on 2 July 1942 and posthumously awarded the Air Medal.

== History ==
Neunzer was laid down by the Consolidated Steel Corp., Orange, Texas, 29 January 1943; launched 1 June 1943; sponsored by Mrs. Weimar E. Neunzer, widow of the ship's namesake; and commissioned 27 September 1943.

=== North Atlantic operations ===
Neunzer steamed to Galveston, Texas, and then to New Orleans, Louisiana, for fitting out. During October and November 1943 she went through shakedown off Bermuda. The new destroyer escort next visited Charleston, South Carolina, en route Quonset Point, Rhode Island. For 4 weeks she operated with an Atlantic Fleet research group, developing new equipment for antisubmarine warfare.

After escorting a group of troop transports from Boston, Massachusetts, to join a large convoy bound for England from New York City Neunzer proceeded to Norfolk, Virginia, joining TF 62 on 1 January 1944. With this group she escorted a large convoy to the Mediterranean, spending 8 days at Gibraltar before sailing for home.

=== Escorting Italian submarines ===
On her homeward voyage, she shepherded five Italian submarines to Bermuda for training purposes. During this trip, Neunzer carried out an operation which is believed to be unique for a destroyer escort. She refueled two Italian subs at sea, pumping 12,000 gallons of fuel through a fire plug and 200 feet of fire hose to the submarine.

In May 1944 Lt. Commander Virgil E. Gex became the skipper of the Neunzer. After two more voyages escorting convoys to the Mediterranean, Neunzer was detached from TF 62 to join escort aircraft carrier USS Guadalcanal (CVE-60) in a hunter-killer group. Following training at Casco Bay, Maine, and Bermuda, the task group made two search patrols for submarines in the Middle Atlantic, refueling in Bermuda. Neither of these patrols uncovered any submarines, and Neunzer returned to New York in late August.

During October the group put to sea again, this time searching for submarines in the North Atlantic. Although no submarines were discovered, the force ran through a very severe storm which damaged some of the ships. The patrol was finally broken off; the task group refueled at Ponta Delgada, Azores, before returning home early in November.

The antisubmarine group sailed from Norfolk 1 December for brief training in Bermuda en route Jacksonville, Florida, where for 5 weeks the carrier trained student pilots. The group proceeded to Guantanamo Bay, Cuba, late in January 1945 for 2 weeks of exercises; then Neunzer returned to New York for a brief overhaul.

After returning to Cuba for exercises in early March, the destroyer escort went to Miami, Florida, for 3 weeks as training ship for student officers of the Naval Training Center there.

But now the Germans were ready for their final push, sending their new snorkel-equipped subs across the Atlantic to attack the east coast. Neunzer suddenly received a message at midnight 8 April to get underway 6 hours later for Newfoundland. After refueling and provisioning in Argentia, she left on the 19th and rendezvoused in mid-ocean with one of several carrier task groups strung out across the Atlantic between St. John’s, Newfoundland, and Fayal in the Azores as a net to trap the snorkels.

=== Battling German submarine U-546 ===
USS Frederick C. Davis (DE-136) made contact with U-546 on 24 April and was proceeding to attack when the submarine fired a stern shot which tore the DE apart and sent her down with heavy loss of life.

Eight destroyer escorts immediately joined the action. Neunzer and USS Hayter (DE-212) conducted a search while USS Pillsbury (DE-133) circled the area and USS Flaherty (DE-135) picked up survivors. Flaherty made contact in less than an hour and with Pillsbury proceeded to attack. The U-boat went to 600 feet. Contact was lost from 1045 until 1201 when USS Varian (DE-798), USS Janssen (DE-396), and USS Hubbard (DE-211) began another attack.

Neunzer got into the fight after several attacks by the other DE’s, delivering a creeping attack with Varian and Hubbard while USS Chatelain (DE-149) directed. Contact was lost once more at about 1600, and Chatelain and Neunzer were ordered to return to the scouting line.

The line was expanded, and the ships began a sweep through the area, determined to prevent the submarine’s escape. Varian made contact once more at 1731 and Flaherty was ordered to attack. She fired at 1810. Four minutes later a small oil slick began coming to the surface. Flaherty made another hedgehog attack at 1828, and at 1838 the U-boat broke surface.

Every ship in the line within range began firing. At 1844, after more than ten and a half hours of attacks, U-546 rolled under for her last dive. Thirty-three of her crew, including the captain, were taken prisoner.

=== V-E Day ===
After V-E Day, Neunzer returned to New York for 2 weeks and left on 25 May to escort the last Atlantic convoy of World War II from New York to Southampton, England. She returned without a convoy, and remained in New York harbor from 15 June until 6 July.

In July the ship trained at Casco Bay, Maine, and served as target for the Motor Torpedo Boat Training Center, Melville, Rhode Island. On 1 August she sailed to New London, Connecticut, to escort U-505, captured by Guadalcanal’s task group in June 1944. The sub was exhibited along the east coast and the Gulf Coast throughout the end of 1945 in a drive to sell War Bonds.

=== Post-War decommissioning ===
After operations along the Atlantic coast, Neunzer decommissioned in January 1947 and entered the Atlantic Reserve Fleet. Into 1970 she remained berthed at Philadelphia, Pennsylvania. On 1 July 1972 she was struck from the Navy list, and she was sold 1 November 1973, and scrapped.

== Awards ==
Neunzer received one battle star for World War II service.
