= USS Jenks =

Buckley-class destroyer escort

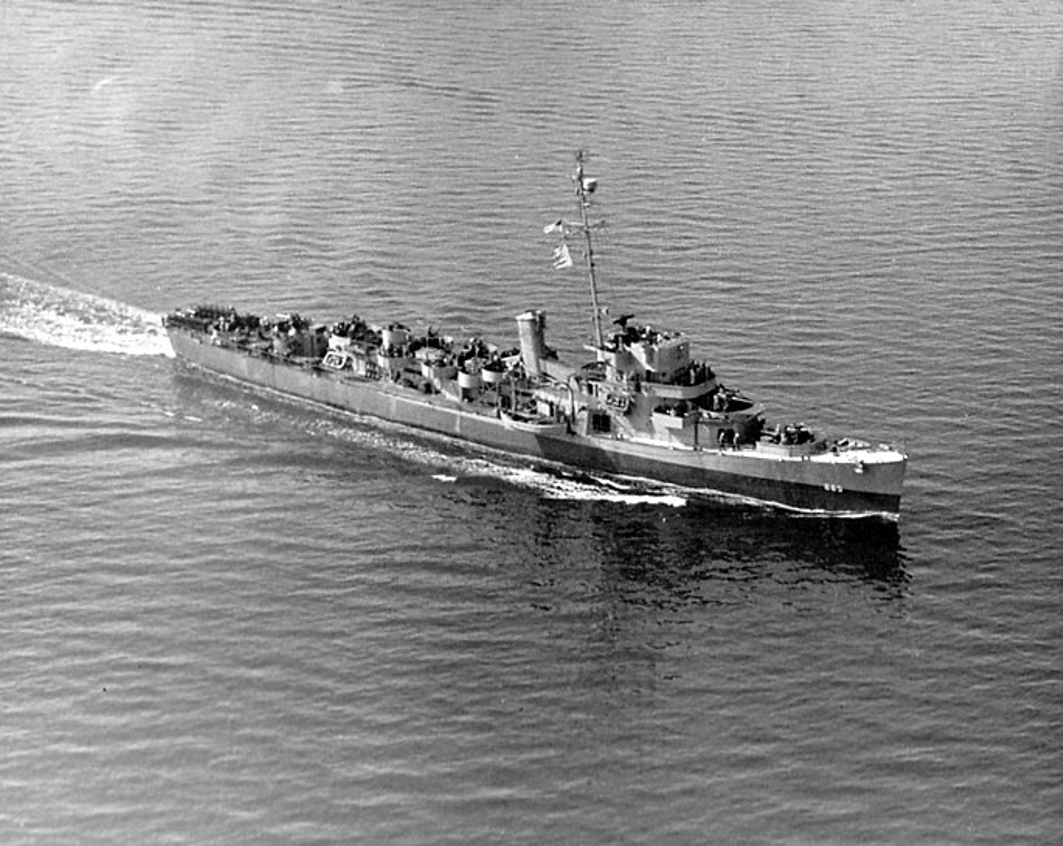

History

United States
- Builder: Dravo Corporation, Pittsburgh, Pennsylvania
- Laid down: 12 May 1943
- Launched: 11 September 1943
- Commissioned: 19 January 1944
- Decommissioned: 26 June 1946
- Stricken: 1 February 1966
- Fate: Sold for scrap, 5 March 1968

General characteristics
- Displacement: 1,740 tons full; 1,400 tons, standard
- Length: 306 ft 0 in (93.27 m)
- Beam: 36 ft 9 in (11.20 m)
- Draft: 13 ft 6 in (4.11 m)
- Propulsion: GE turbo-electric drive, 12,000 shp (8.9 MW); two propellers
- Speed: 24 knots (44 km/h)
- Range: 4,940 nautical miles (9,150 km) at 12 knots (22 km/h)
- Complement: 15 officers, 198 men
- Armament: 3 × 3 in (76 mm) DP guns, 3 × 21 in (53 cm) torpedo tubes, 1 × 1.1 in (28 mm) quad AA gun, 8 × 20 mm cannon, 1 × hedgehog projector, 2 × depth charge tracks, 8 × K-gun depth charge projectors

USS Jenks (DE-665) was a Buckley-class destroyer escort in service with the United States Navy from 1944 to 1946. She was scrapped in 1968.

The ship was named for Henry Pease Jenks, who was killed aboard USS Atlanta during the Naval Battle of Guadalcanal on 13 November 1942.

== Construction and commissioning ==
Jenks was laid down by Dravo Corporation, Pittsburgh, Pennsylvania, 12 May 1943; launched on 11 September 1943; sponsored by Mrs. M. L. Jenks. mother of Lieutenant (j.g.) Jenks; and commissioned at New Orleans, Louisiana, on 19 January 1944.

== History ==
Following shakedown training out of Bermuda in February, the ship moved to the all-important Atlantic convoy lanes to act as an escort ship during the great buildup of men and supplies in Europe. She arrived at New York on 21 April after one such voyage to the United Kingdom in April. Following training exercises, she steamed to Norfolk, Virginia on 10 May and joined escort carrier USS Guadalcanal (CVE-60) and her hunter-killer group under Captain Daniel V. Gallery. The ships sortied 15 May bound for the Atlantic shipping lanes in quest of German U-boats. After two weeks of searching, the group was headed toward Casablanca when on 4 June it detected U-505 and closed for the attack. An accurate depth charge attack by USS Chatelain (DE-149) brought the submarine to the surface, where her crew abandoned ship. Immediately, a well-planned boarding action commenced; and, despite the danger from damage and German booby traps, salvage parties succeeded in saving the submarine. Jenks picked up survivors from the U-boat, and her boat went alongside to take off valuable bridge publications. Through skillful damage control work the captured submarine, a major intelligence find, was gotten safely and secretly to Bermuda.

Jenks returned from this history-making cruise 16 June and arrived at New London, Conn. on 28 June to serve as a training ship. She remained on this duty until late July, and departed Norfolk the 31st with another convoy to the Mediterranean. In the months that followed the ship made four escort voyages to African ports, helping to protect the vital flow of supplies and men. Between assignments she engaged in training out of Casco Bay, Maine.

Jenks reached Boston on her final convoy voyage 19 May 1945, the war against the European foe then over. The ship underwent much-needed voyage repairs at Boston Navy Yard and then sailed to Miami, Florida, arriving 8 June to serve as school ship for the Naval Training Center. In August she took part in training exercises in the Caribbean. Jenks continued peacetime operations out of Charleston, S.C. and Key West, Fla. until arriving Green Cove Springs, Fla., 2 May 1946. She decommissioned on 26 June entered the Atlantic Reserve Fleet, and was later moved to the Texas Group, where she remained until she was struck from the Navy List on 1 February 1966 and scrapped.

Jenks received two battle stars for World War II service, in addition to the Presidential Unit Citation for taking part in the capture of U-505.
