= USS Janssen =

WWII US naval vessel

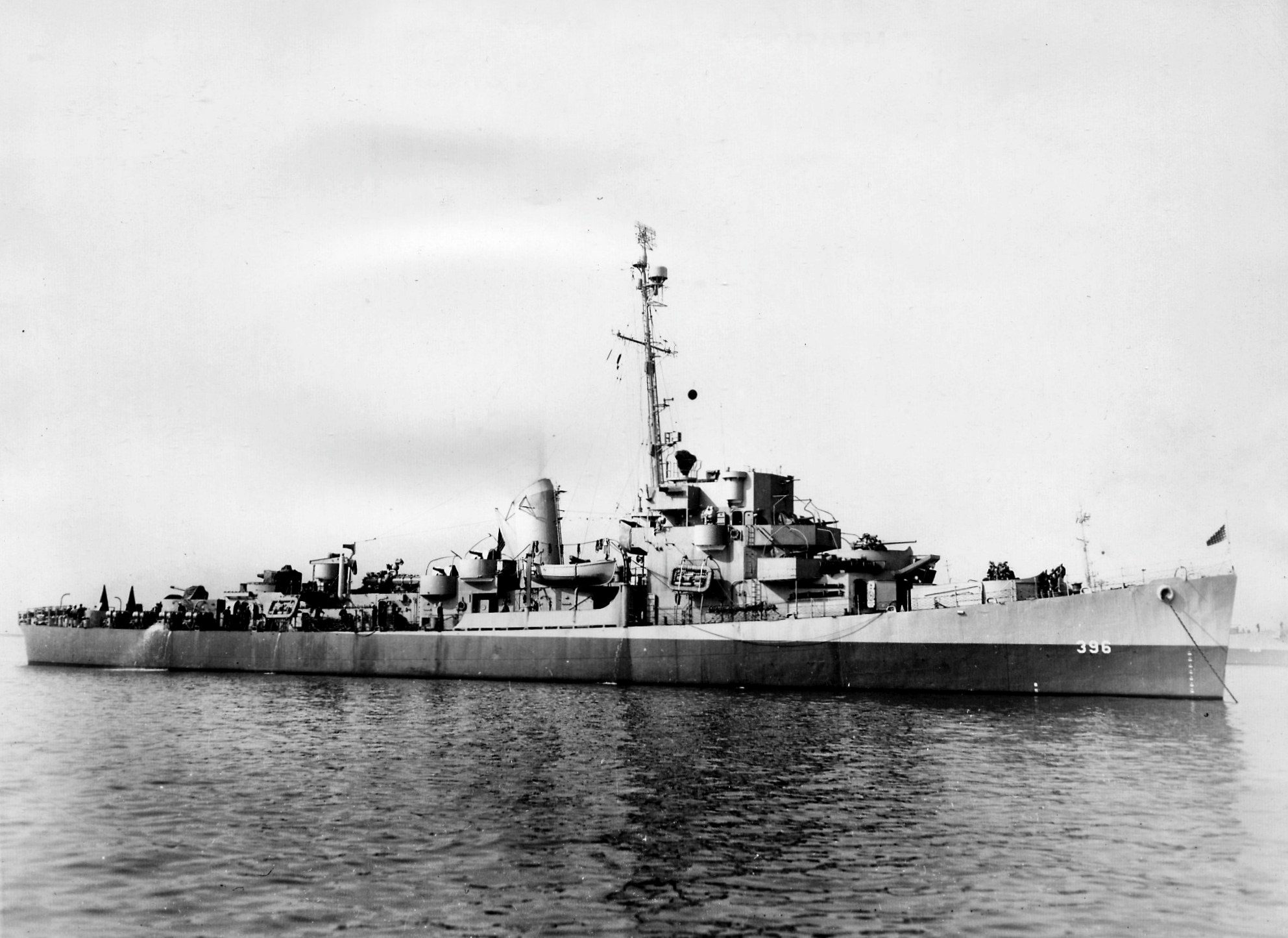

History

United States
- Namesake: Ralph Wille Janssen
- Builder: Brown Shipbuilding, Houston, Texas
- Laid down: 4 August 1943
- Launched: 4 October 1943
- Commissioned: 18 December 1943
- Decommissioned: 12 April 1946
- Stricken: 1 July 1972
- Fate: Sold for scrapping 15 October 1973

General characteristics
- Class & type: Edsall-class destroyer escort
- Displacement: 1,253 tons standard; 1,590 tons full load
- Length: 306 feet (93.27 m)
- Beam: 36.58 feet (11.15 m)
- Draft: 10.42 full load feet (3.18 m)
- Propulsion: 4 FM diesel engines, 4 diesel-generators, 6,000 shp (4.5 MW), 2 screws
- Speed: 21 knots (39 km/h)
- Range: 9,100 nmi. at 12 knots; (17,000 km at 22 km/h)
- Complement: 8 officers, 201 enlisted
- Armament: 3 × single 3 in (76 mm)/50 guns; 1 × twin 40 mm AA guns; 8 × single 20 mm AA guns; 1 × triple 21 in (533 mm) torpedo tubes; 8 × depth charge projectors; 1 × depth charge projector (hedgehog); 2 × depth charge tracks

USS Janssen (DE-396) was an Edsall-class destroyer escort in service with the United States Navy from 1943 to 1946. She was sold for scrapping in 1973.

== Namesake ==
Ralph Wille Janssen was born on 28 January 1915 in Chicago Heights, Illinois. He enlisted in the United States Naval Reserve on 12 October 1940. He was later appointed Midshipman, undergoing training on board USS Arkansas and at the Naval Reserve Midshipman's School 1940–1. Upon commissioning, Janssen reported to the destroyer USS Porter on 2 August 1941, and served on it during the critical first months of the Pacific war. Promoted to Lieutenant (junior grade) on 15 June 1942, he was killed on 26 October 1942 when Porter was torpedoed by an Imperial Japanese Navy submarine during the Battle of the Santa Cruz Islands.

== History ==
She was laid down by Brown Shipbuilding Co., Houston, Texas, 4 August 1943; launched 10 October 1943; sponsored by Mrs. Alfred Janssen, stepmother of Lieutenant (j.g.) Janssen; and commissioned 18 December 1943.

=== Battle of the Atlantic ===
Janssen departed 11 January 1944 from Galveston, Texas, to conduct shakedown training out of Bermuda. Upon completion she rendezvoused 27 February with escort carrier USS Bogue (CVE-9) and her escorts to form a submarine hunter-killer group. In the months that followed, Janssen and her sister ships attacked numerous submarine contacts while cruising between the United States and the Azores; and, after a brief rest in North African ports, they returned to Norfolk, Virginia, 2 May.

Janssen and the Bogue group were soon underway again cruising the convoy routes of the North Atlantic. Hunter-killer groups such as this one became a prime weapon against the U-boat and contributed importantly to the important work of keeping the supply lines to Europe and the Mediterranean open. Janssen arrived New York 24 September 1944 for training exercises, and in December took part in an emergency patrol off the coast of Maine, where increased U-boat activity was anticipated.

Early 1945 found Janssen training antisubmarine teams in Casco Bay and the Bermuda area. She got underway on offensive operations once more 28 March and conducted 2 weeks of Atlantic barrier patrol. Joining the Bogue group again 16 April, the ship steamed into the North Atlantic for her last patrol. Several attacks were made on U-boats. USS Frederick C. Davis (DE-136) was torpedoed and sunk with great loss of life 24 April. Then upon making sonar contact, Janssen, aided by other escorts, closed in on the enemy firing over 40 depth charges, in three separate attacks. Finally, stricken U-546 came to the surface where she was destroyed.

=== Pacific War ===
The destroyer escort arrived New York 11 May, after the war against Germany had officially ended. She sailed to Norfolk, Virginia, for the installation of additional antiaircraft mounts in preparation for more action, this time against Japan. Janssen conducted training in the Caribbean in June, and arrived Pearl Harbor via the Panama Canal and California 21 August. Too late to take active part in the war against Japan, the ship embarked 100 returning veterans at Pearl Harbor and brought them to San Pedro, Los Angeles, 9 September.

=== Decommissioning and fate ===
Janssen again transited the Panama Canal, arriving Charleston, South Carolina, 25 September. Designated for deactivation, she departed 24 October for Green Cove Springs, Florida, where she decommissioned 12 April 1946. Janssen then joined the Atlantic Reserve Fleet and, was berthed at Philadelphia, Pennsylvania. On 1 July 1972 she was struck from the Navy list and she was sold for scrapping 15 October 1973.

== Awards ==
Janssen received one battle star for World War II service and shared in the Presidential Unit Citation awarded to the various ships of the Bogue task groups for outstanding antisubmarine work in the Atlantic during 1943–44.
