= Operation Teardrop =

1945 US Navy operation in the North Atlantic

- Part of the Atlantic Campaign of World War II
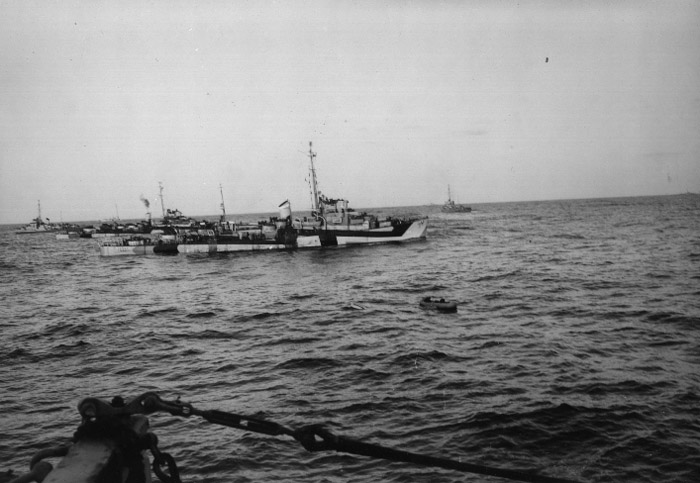
- A life raft carrying U-546 survivors in the midst of U.S. Navy destroyer escorts on April 24, 1945
Date	April–May 1945
Location	North Atlantic Ocean
Result	Allied victory

Belligerents
Germany	United States; Canada

Commanders and leaders
Eberhard Godt	Jonas H. Ingram

Strength
7 submarines	42 destroyers; 4 escort carriers

Casualties and losses
Casualties: 218 killed; 33 captured; Losses: 5 submarines sunk	Casualties: 126 killed; Losses: 1 destroyer sunk

Operation Teardrop was a United States Navy operation during World War II, conducted between April and May 1945, to sink German U-boats approaching the Eastern Seaboard, that were believed to be armed with V-1 flying bombs. Germany had threatened to attack New York with V-1 flying bombs and rocket U-boats. After the war, it was discovered that the submarines had not been carrying either.

Operation Teardrop was planned during late 1944 because of intelligence reports that Germany was preparing a force of missile-armed submarines. Two large U.S. Navy anti-submarine warfare task forces were set up. The plan was executed in April 1945 after several Type IX submarines put to sea from Norway bound for North America. While severe weather in the North Atlantic greatly reduced the effectiveness of the four U.S. Navy escort carriers involved, long patrol lines of destroyer escorts detected and engaged most of the German submarines. Aircraft of the Royal Canadian Air Force supported this effort.

Five of the seven submarines in the group stationed off the United States were sunk, four with all hands. Thirty-three crew members from U-546 were captured, and specialists among them were interrogated under torture. The destroyer escort USS Frederick C. Davis, was sunk with the loss of most of her crew. The survivors were pulled from the water within three hours. The war ended shortly afterwards and all surviving U-boats surrendered. Interrogation of their crews found that missile launching equipment was never fitted to the U-boats, which was further confirmed after the war.

== Background ==
In late 1944, the Allies received intelligence reports which suggested that Germany's Kriegsmarine was planning to use V-1 flying bombs launched from submarines to attack cities on the east coast of the United States. In September of that year, Oskar Mantel, a spy captured by the U.S. Navy when the submarine (U-1229) transporting him to Maine was sunk, told his FBI interrogators that several missile-equipped U-boats were being readied. United States Tenth Fleet analysts subsequently examined photos of unusual mountings on U-boats at bases in Norway, but concluded that they were wooden tracks used to load torpedoes. Further rumors of missile-armed submarines emerged later that year, including one from Sweden passed on by the Supreme Headquarters Allied Expeditionary Force. The British Admiralty discounted these reports, and assessed that while V-1s could be potentially mounted on Type IX submarines, the Germans were unlikely to devote scarce resources to such a project.

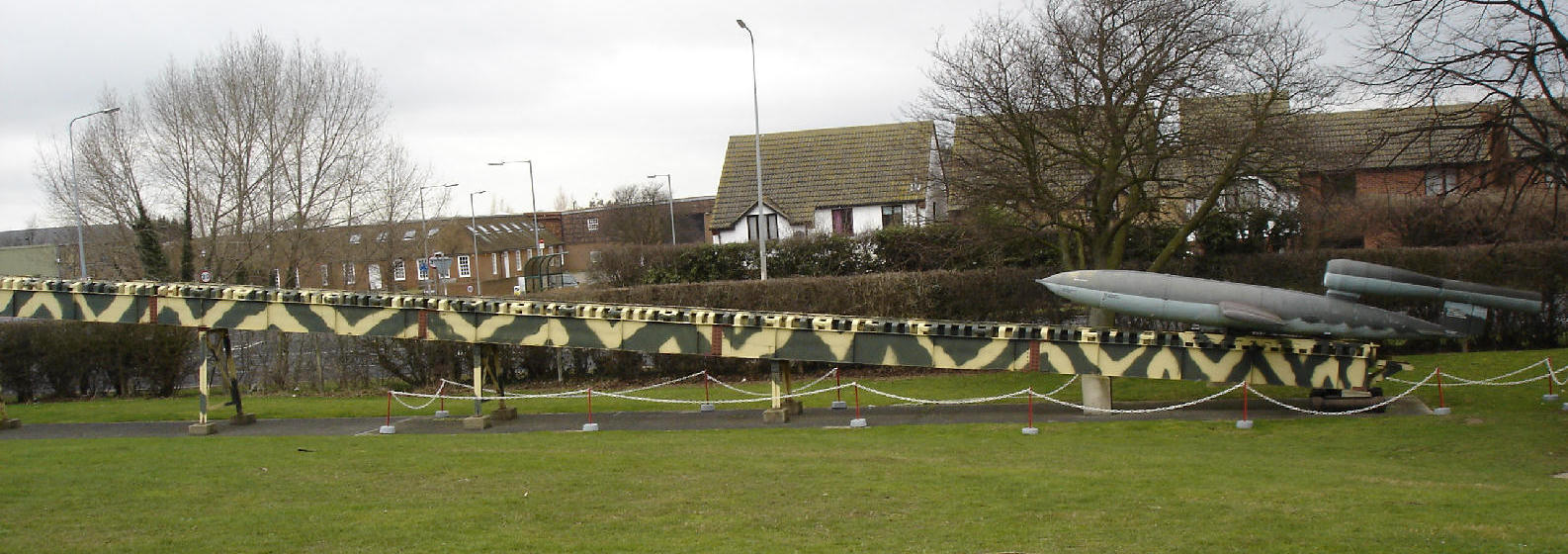
V-1 at Imperial War Museum Duxford

Despite the Tenth Fleet and Admiralty assessments, the U.S. military and government remained concerned that Germany would conduct vengeance attacks against East Coast cities. In early November 1944, the Eastern Sea Frontier mounted an intensive search for submarines within 250 miles (400 km) of New York City. In late December 1944, the spies William Curtis Colepaugh and Erich Gimpel, who had been captured in New York City after being landed by U-1230 in Maine, told their interrogators that Germany was preparing a group of rocket-equipped submarines. On 10 December, the Mayor of New York City, Fiorello La Guardia, publicly warned that Germany was considering an attack on New York with long-range rockets. La Guardia's warning and the claims made by the captured spies received considerable media coverage. Despite this, the Department of War, which was dominated by the United States Army, advised President Franklin D. Roosevelt on 11 December that the threat of missile attack was so low that it did not justify the diversion of resources from other tasks. This assessment was not supported by the U.S. Navy.

In response to the perceived threat, the U.S. Atlantic Fleet prepared a plan to defend the east coast from attacks by aerial raiders and missiles. This plan was originally code-named Operation Bumblebee, and later renamed Operation Teardrop. Completed on 6 January 1945, the plan involved U.S. Navy anti-submarine forces as well as United States Army Air Forces and Army units, which were responsible for shooting down attacking aircraft and missiles. The centerpiece of the plan was the formation of two large naval task forces to operate in the mid-Atlantic as a barrier against submarines approaching the east coast. These task forces were formed from several existing escort carrier groups, and used Naval Station Argentia, Newfoundland, as their forward operating base. As well as guarding against missile attacks, these large forces were tasked with countering the new and high-performance Type XXI submarines if they began operating in the central Atlantic. The Atlantic Fleet's commander, Vice Admiral Jonas H. Ingram, gave a press conference on 8 January in which he warned there was a threat of missile attack and announced that a large force had been assembled to counter seaborne missile launchers.

In January 1945, German Minister of Armaments and War Production Albert Speer made a propaganda broadcast in which he claimed that V-1 and V-2s "would fall on New York by February 1, 1945", increasing the U.S. Government's concern over the threat of attack. However, the Germans had no ability to fire missiles from their submarines, as both attempts to develop submarine-launched rockets ended in failure. In June 1942, U-511 was used to trial small and short-ranged artillery rockets which could be fired while submerged. Development of this system ended in early 1943, as it was found to decrease the U-boats' seaworthiness. The German military also began the development of a U-boat-towed launch canister for the V-2 ballistic missile in November 1944. Once complete, these canisters were to be towed to a position off the United States east coast and be used to attack New York. Vulkan Docks in Stettin was contracted to build a prototype in March or April 1945, but little work took place before Germany's final collapse. It is unlikely that the system would have been successful if it had been completed.

== Battle ==
=== Initial deployments ===
Croatan anchored off New York City in October 1945

Nine Type IX U-boats were dispatched from Norway to patrol off Canada and the United States in March 1945 and attack shipping. The purpose of this deployment was to divert Allied anti-submarine forces away from the coastal waters of the United Kingdom. These waters were the main operational area for German submarines in early 1945, but heavy casualties had forced the German navy to break off operations in late March. On 12 April, U-518, U-546, U-805, U-858, U-880, U-881 and U-1235 were designated "Gruppe Seewolf" ("Group Seawolf") and ordered to attack shipping from New York southwards. The remaining two boats, U-530 and U-548, were directed to Canadian waters.

The Allies were aware of this force's departure and destination through information gathered from Enigma decrypts. Vice Admiral Ingram and the U.S. Tenth Fleet concluded that the boats in Group Seewolf were carrying V-1s and launched Teardrop in response. The ships of the First Barrier Force, which comprised escort carriers USS Mission Bay and Croatan and 20 destroyer escorts, sortied from Hampton Roads between 25 and 27 March, proceeded to Argentia to refuel and assembled east of Cape Race on 11 April. Twelve of the destroyer escorts deployed into a line 120 miles (190 km) long while the two carriers, each protected by four destroyer escorts, sailed to the west of the line. The carriers' air operations were, however, greatly hindered by heavy seas. The rough weather also forced the cancellation of planned memorial services for President Roosevelt after his death on 12 April.

As it sailed west, Group Seewolf was ordered to attack shipping by U-boat Command. The boats found no targets, however, as the Allies had routed convoys to the south to avoid the submarines and severe weather. The German submarines began to reach their initial stations east of the Grand Banks of Newfoundland on 8 April. U-boat Command assigned Group Seewolf 12 different scouting lines between 2 and 19 April. The radio signals directing these deployments were decrypted by the Allies, providing them with accurate information on where the boats were operating.

=== First Barrier Force actions ===
Just before midnight on 15 April, USS Stanton made radar contact with U-1235 at a position about 500 miles (800 km) north of Flores Island. She immediately attacked the submarine with her Hedgehog anti-submarine mortar, but the submarine submerged and escaped. Assisted by USS Frost, Stanton quickly gained sonar contact with the submarine and made three more Hedgehog attacks. The third attack, which was conducted at 00:33 on 16 April, sank the submarine with the loss of her entire crew. Shortly afterwards Frost detected U-880 by radar as she attempted to flee the area on the surface. After illuminating the submarine with star shell and spotlights, the destroyer escort opened fire on her with Bofors 40 mm guns from a range of 650 yards (590 m) at 02:09. U-880 quickly submerged but was tracked by Stanton's and Frost's sonar operators. The two American ships made several Hedgehog attacks on the submarine, with Stanton sinking her with no survivors at 04:04. Both submarines suffered huge explosions after being struck by Hedgehog projectiles. This further raised the fear that they were carrying rockets and motivated the First Barrier Force to intensify its efforts to destroy the remaining U-boats.

The First Barrier Force maneuvered south westward following the destruction of U-1235 and U-880. Leigh Light-equipped Consolidated B-24 Liberators from VPB-114 spotted U-805 on the surface during the nights of 18–19 April. The submarine was only 50 nautical miles (93 km) from Mission Bay and her escorts, but was not attacked as the aircraft could not confirm whether she was hostile before she submerged. On the night of 20 April, U-546 attempted to torpedo a U.S. destroyer escort, but missed. The following night, U-805 was detected by USS Mosley, but escaped after being depth charged by Mosley, Lowe and J.R.Y. Blakely for two hours.

The First Barrier Force scored its final success on the night of 21–22 April. Just before midnight, USS Carter detected U-518 with sonar. USS Neal A. Scott joined her and made the initial Hedgehog attack on the submarine. Following this, Carter made her own Hedgehog run, which sank U-518 with no survivors. By this time, the First Barrier Force was returning to Argentia, after the Second Barrier Force had relieved it.

Even though Teardrop was undertaken in the part of the North Atlantic for which Canada had primary responsibility, Ingram did not seek assistance from the Royal Canadian Navy (RCN) at any stage of the engagement. Moreover, Ingram did not provide the Canadian military with a situation report until after the sinking of U-518. However, aircraft of the Royal Canadian Air Force (RCAF) flew offensive patrols in support of the American effort, and the RCN and RCAF intensified their patrols of inshore waters around Halifax.

=== Second Barrier Force actions ===
The Second Barrier Force comprised escort carriers USS Bogue and Core and 22 destroyer escorts. Bogue and 10 destroyer escorts had sailed from Quonset on 16 April, while Core and 12 destroyer escorts sailed from Bermuda and other locations. The force was initially stationed along the 45th meridian in a patrol line 105 miles (169 km) long, and sailed towards the east. This line was made up of 14 destroyer escorts sailing at 5 mi (8.0 km) intervals, with Core and her four escorts at its northern end and Bogue and her four escorts at the southern end.

On the night of 22–23 April, U-boat Command dissolved Group Seewolf and directed the three surviving boats to take up stations between New York and Halifax. Shortly afterwards, U-881, and U-889, which had been operating separately, were also ordered to positions between New York and Cape Hatteras. Radio signals directing these deployments were decrypted by Allied code breakers and increased fears that the submarines were trying to attack American cities.

The Second Barrier Force encountered its first U-boat on 23 April when a Grumman TBF Avenger from VC-19 sighted U-881 about 74 nautical miles (137 km) north west of Bogue just after noon. The aircraft dropped depth charges but did not seriously damage the submarine. This was the first attack made by an aircraft during Teardrop.

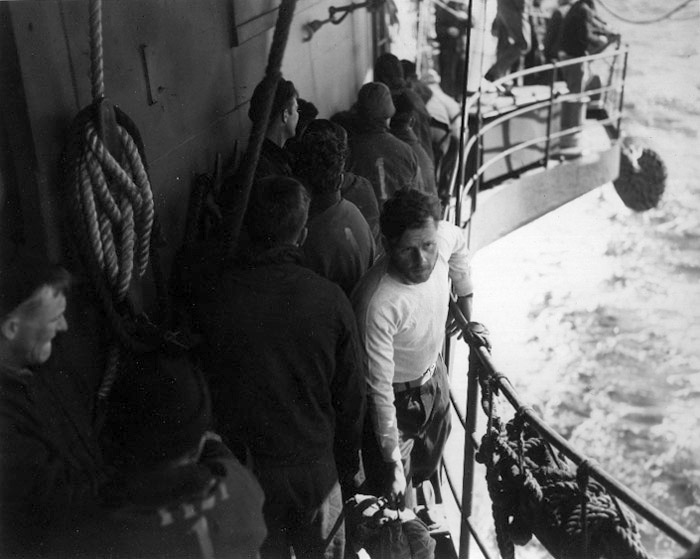
Kapitänleutnant Just aboard Bogue

The next day, U-546 sighted Core and maneuvered to attack the escort carrier. She attempted to pass through the barrier line but was detected by USS Frederick C. Davis at 08:30, which immediately prepared to attack the submarine. After realizing that his boat had been detected U-546's commander, Kapitänleutnant Paul Just, fired a T-5 acoustic torpedo at the destroyer escort from a range of 650 yards (590 m). Frederick C. Davis' Foxer decoy was not effective, and the torpedo struck her forward engine room at 0835. She sank five minutes later with the loss of 126 of her 192 crewmen. Eight American destroyer escorts subsequently hunted U-546 for almost 10 hours, before USS Flaherty severely damaged her with a Hedgehog salvo. The submarine immediately surfaced but sank after Flaherty and three or four other destroyer escorts fired at it. Kapitänleutnant Just and 32 other crewmen survived the sinking and were taken prisoner.

Some of U-546's survivors were harshly treated in an attempt to force them to divulge whether the submarines bound for the U.S. east coast were carrying missiles. After brief interviews on board Bogue, the survivors were transferred to the U.S. base at Argentia. Upon arrival on 27 April, the prisoners were screened for interrogation, with eight specialists being separated from the other 25 survivors, who were then sent to prisoner of war camps. The specialists were held in solitary confinement and subjected to "shock interrogation" techniques, exhausting physical exercise and beatings. On 30 April, Kapitänleutnant Just provided brief information on Group Seewolf's composition and mission following a second interview in which he collapsed unconscious. The information provided by Just and the other specialists did not mention whether the submarines were equipped with missiles. The eight men were transferred to Fort Hunt, Virginia shortly after VE Day, where they continued to be harshly treated until Just agreed to write an account of U-546's history on 12 May. Historian Philip K. Lundeberg has written that the beating and torture of U-546's survivors was a "singular atrocity" motivated by the interrogators' need to promptly extract information on potential missile attacks.

The Second Barrier Force slowly moved south west from 24 April, searching for the remaining U-boats. USS Swenning made radar contact with a submarine on the night of 24 April, but it escaped during the resulting search. After a week of searching south of the Newfoundland Banks, the barrier force was split on 2 May to provide greater depth. The Mission Bay group reinforced the Second Barrier Force during this period, bringing its strength to three escort carriers and 31 destroyer escorts.

U-881 became the fifth and final U-boat to be sunk during Teardrop on 5 May. The boat was detected while attempting to pass submerged through the barrier line by USS Farquhar shortly before daybreak. The destroyer escort immediately turned to starboard and dropped depth charges, which sank the submarine with no survivors at 0616. U-881 was the last German submarine to be sunk by the U.S. Navy during World War II.

The Second Barrier Force established its final barrier line along the 60th meridian on 7 May. Following the end of World War II in Europe that day, it accepted the surrender of U-234, U-805, U-858 and U-1228 at sea before returning to bases on the U.S. east coast.

== Aftermath ==
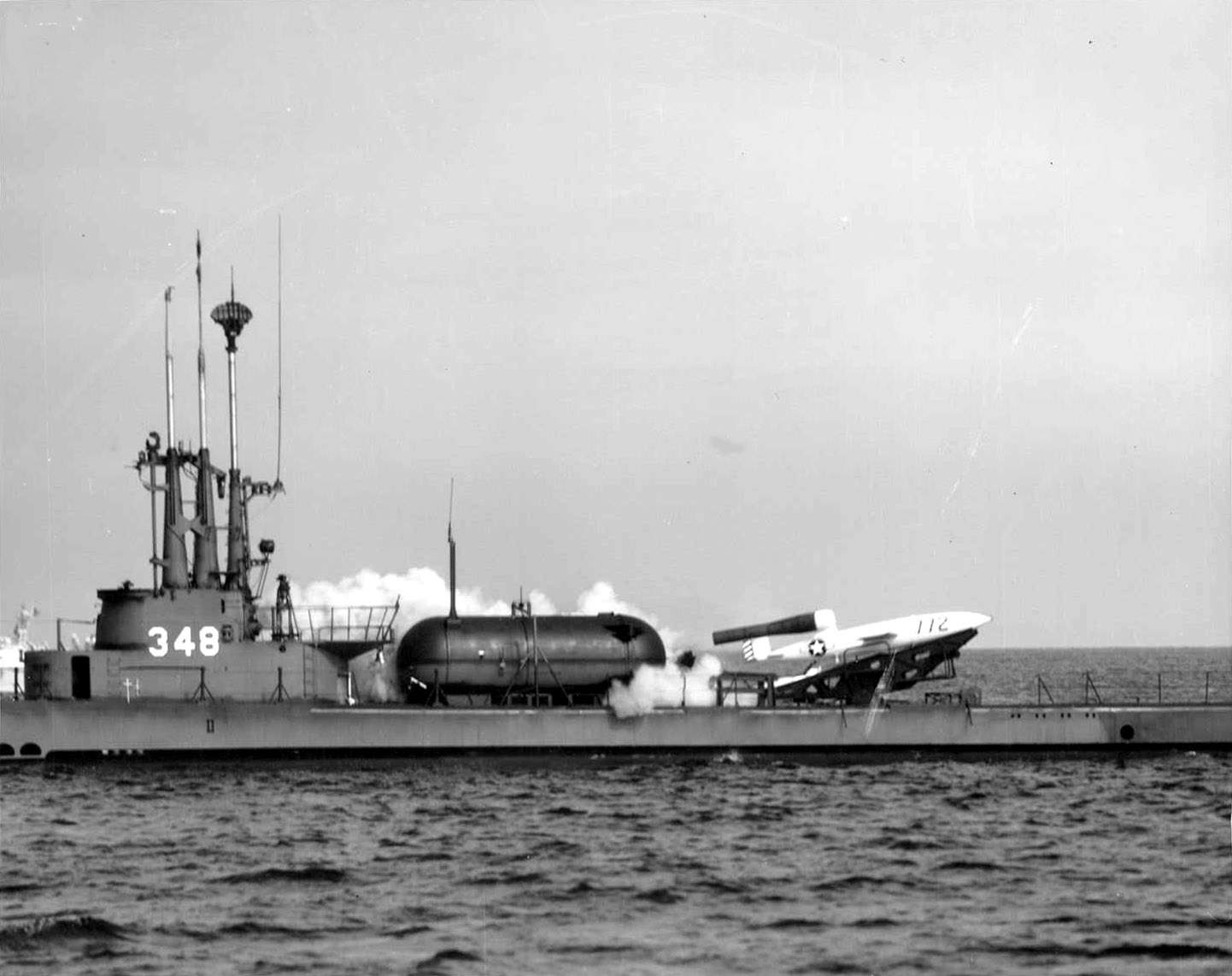
A "Loon" is fired from Cusk in 1951

After the German surrender the U.S. Navy continued its efforts to determine whether the U-boats had carried missiles. The crews of U-805 and U-858 were interrogated and confirmed that their boats were not fitted with missile launching equipment. Kapitänleutnant Fritz Steinhoff, who had commanded U-511 during her rocket trials and was captured at sea when he surrendered U-873, was subjected to an abusive interrogation at Portsmouth by the interviewers of U-546's crew. An official Navy investigation was held into this interrogation after Steinhoff committed suicide at Charles Street Jail in Boston shortly afterwards. It is not known if the Allies were aware of Steinhoff's involvement in the rocket trials.

The tactics used in Teardrop were evaluated by U.S. Navy officers after the war. The escort carriers' air wings were disappointed with their experience, as their ability to detect submarines was hampered by severe weather throughout the operation. Despite this, the aircraft were successful in forcing the U-boats to remain submerged, thereby greatly slowing their speed. Other after action reports stressed the importance of teamwork between destroyer escorts when attacking submarines and argued that single barrier lines such as those used throughout most of Teardrop were inferior to grouping ships in assigned patrol areas. Nevertheless, Philip K. Lundeberg has assessed the operation as "a classic demonstration not only of coordinated hunter tactics, derived in part from British experience, but also of the profound impact of communications intelligence in the interdiction of U-boat transit and operating areas." Similarly, the British official history of the role intelligence played in World War II noted that information obtained from decrypted German radio transmissions contributed to "virtually all" of the sinkings during Teardrop.

A variant of the V-1 was used by the U.S. Navy to test the feasibility of launching missiles from submarines in the years after World War II. Republic‐Ford JB‐2 "Loon" missiles were launched from USS Cusk and USS Carbonero in a series of tests which began on February 12, 1947. These tests were successful, and led to the development of further submarine-launched cruise missiles. The U.S. Navy's success in adapting a variant of the V-1 to be launched from submarines also demonstrated that it would have been technically feasible for the German navy to have done the same.
