= USS Pillsbury (DE-133) =

1943 Edsall-class destroyer escort

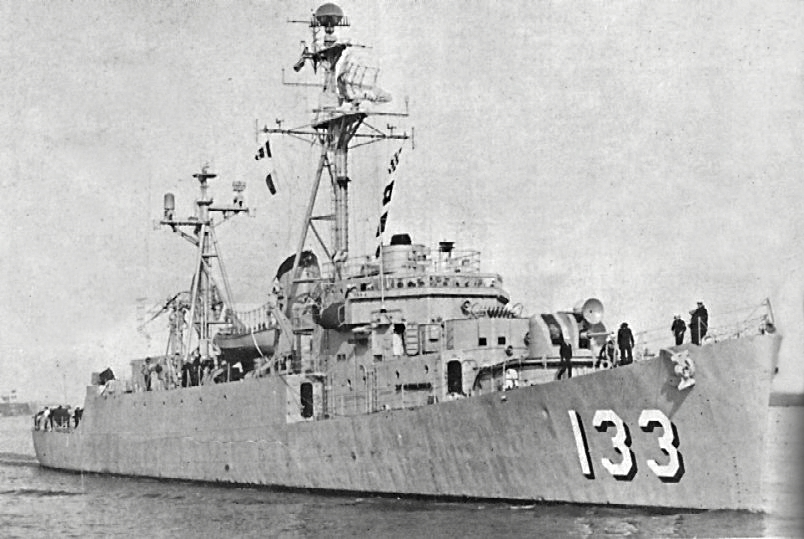

History

United States
- Namesake: John E. Pillsbury
- Builder: Consolidated Steel Corporation, Orange, Texas
- Laid down: 18 July 1942
- Launched: 10 January 1943
- Commissioned: 7 June 1943 to 1947; 15 March 1955 to 20 June 1960
- Reclassified: DER-133, August 1954
- Stricken: 1 July 1965
- Honours and awards: 5 battle stars and a Presidential Unit Citation
- Fate: Sold for scrapping, 1966

General characteristics
- Class & type: Edsall-class destroyer escort
- Displacement: 1,253 tons standard; 1,590 tons full load
- Length: 306 feet (93.27 m)
- Beam: 36.58 feet (11.15 m)
- Draft: 10.42 full load feet (3.18 m)
- Propulsion: 4 FM diesel engines, 4 diesel-generators, 6,000 shp (4.5 MW), 2 screws
- Speed: 21 knots (39 km/h)
- Range: 9,100 nmi. at 12 knots; (17,000 km at 22 km/h)
- Complement: 8 officers, 201 enlisted
- Armament: 3 × single 3 in (76 mm)/50 guns; 1 × twin 40 mm AA guns; 8 × single 20 mm AA guns; 1 × triple 21 in (533 mm) torpedo tubes; 8 × depth charge projectors; 1 × depth charge projector (hedgehog); 2 × depth charge tracks

USS Pillsbury (DE-133) was an Edsall-class destroyer escort in service with the United States Navy from 1943 to 1947. She served again as a radar picket ship from 1955 to 1960 and was sold for scrapping in 1966.

== History ==
She was named after Rear Admiral John E. Pillsbury, known as having been one of the world's foremost geographers and as an authority on the Gulf Stream. Actively identified with the National Geographic Society for many years, he was president of the society at the time of his death, 30 December 1919.

Pillsbury (DE–133) was laid down by the Consolidated Steel Corp., Orange, Texas, on 18 July 1942, launched 10 January 1943 sponsored by Mrs. Elsie G. Richardson, and commissioned 7 June 1943, with Lt. Comdr. W. Parker, USNR, in command. Parker was later succeeded by Francis L. Dale (later owner of the Cincinnati Reds and a member of Richard M. Nixon's campaign staff).

=== Battle of the Atlantic ===
After shakedown Pillsbury’s first duty was as flagship for Escort Division 4, escorting convoys into Casablanca and Gibraltar. Pillsbury then reported to Task Group 21.12, consisting of USS Guadalcanal and four destroyer escorts, on hunter-killer patrol to seek out and destroy enemy submarines operating along or near convoy routes from the U.S. to Europe.

==== Sinking U-515 ====
On the night of 8 April 1944, planes from Guadalcanal attacked a surfaced German U-boat, which immediately submerged for deep evasive tactics. Pillsbury and USS Flaherty raced to the scene and Pillsbury made initial sound contact and attacked with hedgehogs. The depth charges forced the U-boat to the surface, but the German sailors were determined to fight to a finish with their torpedoes. Flaherty joined Pillsbury, and in a murderous crossfire, made short work of U-515. Six officers, including the captain, and 57 of the crew were captured.

After repair at Norfolk, Virginia, the hunter-killers sailed from Norfolk in May with a special mission to "bring one back live".

==== Capturing U-505 ====
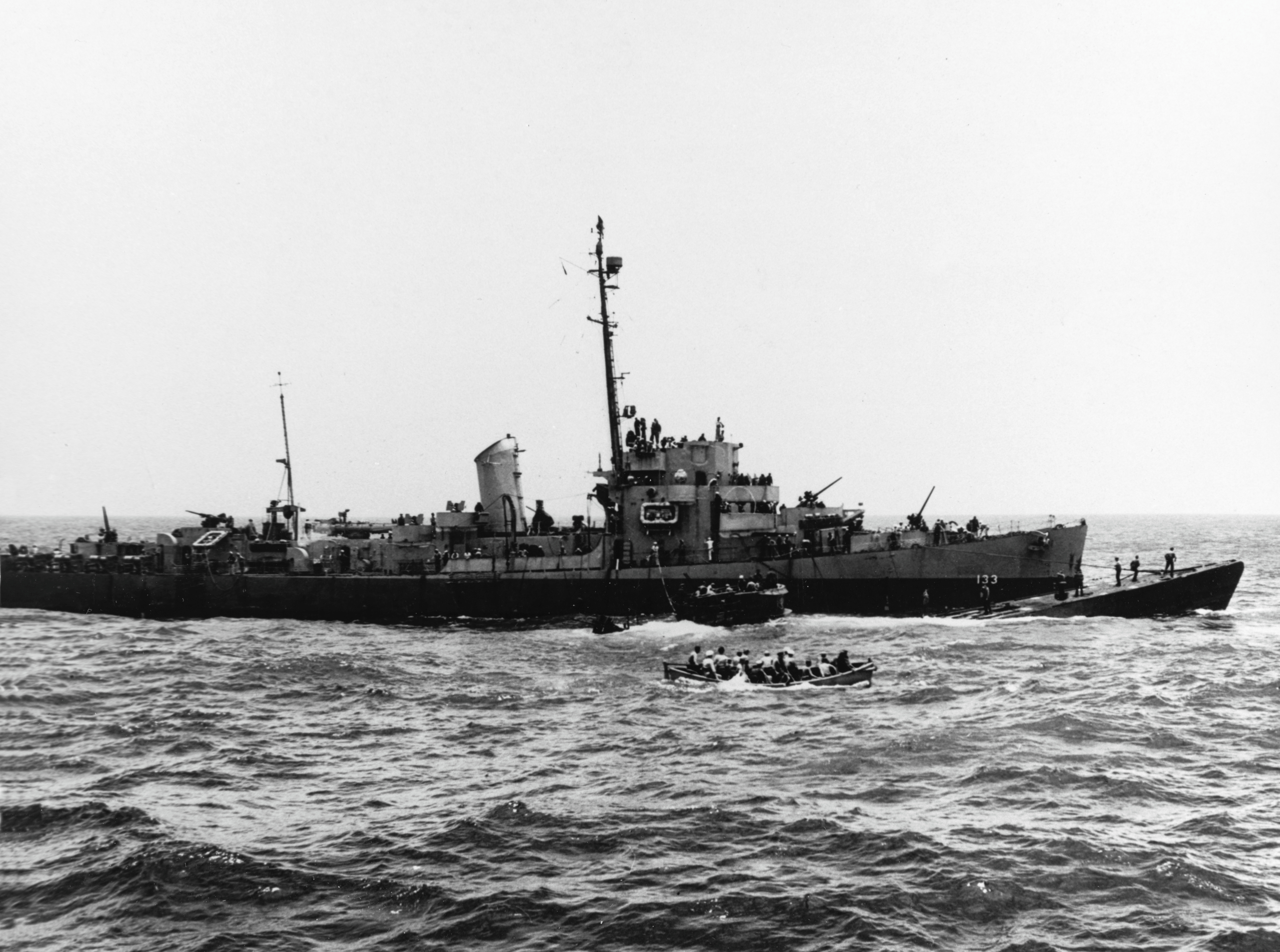
Pillsbury with the captured U-505 alongside, 4 June 1944

On 4 June 1944, about 100 miles off the Cape Verde Islands, sound contact was made on a U-boat trying to penetrate the destroyer screen for a shot at the Guadalcanal. Two pilots sighted the submarine running under the surface, and splashed the sea with gunfire to point out the contact to Pillsbury, USS Jenks, and USS Chatelain rushing to the attack. Their depth charges blasted a hole in the outer hull of the submarine and her captain, believing his boat was doomed, surfaced and ordered the crew to abandon ship, which they did while leaving her engines running. Pillsbury lowered a boarding party, led by Lt(jg) Albert David. The party boarded the still-circling U-505, climbed its conning tower and stormed down the hatches, fully expecting to meet stiff resistance. Finding the boat deserted, the boarders set about collecting two Enigma coding machines, code books, charts, and papers, tearing out delayed-action demolition charges, closing valves, and plugging leaks. For this demonstration of conspicuous gallantry and achievement, Pillsbury was awarded the Presidential Unit Citation. Lt. David was awarded the Medal of Honor and two other members of the boarding party were awarded the Navy Cross. The U-boat's captain, five officers, and 53 of her crew were rescued, taken prisoner, then held incommunicado to keep the boat's capture secret. U-505 was towed 2,500 miles to Bermuda and revealed some of the German Navy's most guarded secrets. The U-505 is now permanently displayed at the Chicago Museum of Science and Industry.

==== Sinking of U-546 ====
On 24 April 1945 Pillsbury, as a member of Task Unit 22.7.1 operating in the North Atlantic, attacked and sank U-546 with depth charges.

==== Surrender of U-858 ====
After hostilities with Germany ended, Pillsbury and USS Pope escorted the first surrendered German U-boat, U-858, from the mid-Atlantic to Cape May, New Jersey, after placing a prize crew aboard.

=== Postwar decommissioning ===
In 1947, Pillsbury was placed out of commission, in reserve, in the Florida Group, Atlantic Reserve Fleet.

=== Radar picket ship ===
In June 1954, the vessel was moved to the Philadelphia Naval Shipyard, fitted out with the latest equipment, redesignated as a radar picket ship, DER–133, in August 1954 and recommissioned 15 March 1955. After refresher training and shakedown, Pillsbury sailed for Newport, Rhode Island, to assume her duties as a radar guardship acting as an element of the protective radar screens around the U.S. During 1957-1960, Pillsbury made seven picket patrols on the Atlantic Barrier, five trips to Argentia, Newfoundland, a European visit to Portsmouth, England, and Le Havre, France, one trip to Summerside, Prince Edward Island, and one trip, in 1958, to Gibraltar. She was decommissioned 20 June 1960, was struck from the Naval Vessel Register 1 July 1965, and was sold for scrapping to Boston Metals Co., Baltimore, Maryland, in 1966.

== Awards ==
Pillsbury received five battle stars for World War II service in addition to the Presidential Unit Citation.
