= USS Davis =

Four ships of the United States Navy have borne the name Davis. The first three were named in honor of Admiral Charles H. Davis. The fourth, DD-937, was named for Commander George F. Davis.

- USS Davis (TB-12), a torpedo boat, launched 1898, sold for scrap 1920
- USS Davis (DD-65), a Sampson-class destroyer, launched 1916, sold 1934
- USS Davis (DD-395), a Somers-class destroyer, launched, 1938, sold 1947
- USS Davis (DD-937), a Forrest Sherman-class destroyer, launched 1956, decommissioned 1982

== See also ==
- USS Frederick C. Davis (DE-136)
- USS George E. Davis (DE-357)
- USS James L. Davis (1861)
- USS M. M. Davis (SP-314)
- USS Rodney M. Davis (FFG-60)
