= German submarine U-546 =

German World War II submarine

History

Nazi Germany
- Name: U-546
- Ordered: 5 June 1941
- Builder: Deutsche Werft AG, Hamburg-Finkenwerder
- Yard number: 367
- Laid down: 6 August 1942
- Launched: 17 March 1943
- Commissioned: 3 June 1943
- Fate: Sunk on 24 April 1945

General characteristics
- Class & type: Type IXC/40 submarine
- Displacement: 1,144 t (1,126 long tons) surfaced; 1,257 t (1,237 long tons) submerged
- Length: 76.76 m (251 ft 10 in) o/a; 58.75 m (192 ft 9 in) pressure hull
- Beam: 6.86 m (22 ft 6 in) o/a; 4.44 m (14 ft 7 in) pressure hull
- Height: 9.60 m (31 ft 6 in)
- Draught: 4.67 m (15 ft 4 in)
- Installed power: 4,400 PS (3,200 kW; 4,300 bhp) (diesels); 1,000 PS (740 kW; 990 shp) (electric)
- Propulsion: 2 shafts; 2 × diesel engines; 2 × electric motors
- Speed: 18.3 knots (33.9 km/h; 21.1 mph) surfaced; 7.3 knots (13.5 km/h; 8.4 mph) submerged
- Range: 13,850 nmi (25,650 km; 15,940 mi) at 10 knots (19 km/h; 12 mph) surfaced; 63 nmi (117 km; 72 mi) at 4 knots (7.4 km/h; 4.6 mph) submerged
- Test depth: 230 m (750 ft)
- Complement: 4 officers, 44 enlisted
- Sensors & processing systems: FuMO-61 Hohentwiel U; FuMB-26 Tunis; G.H.G. Atlas Type multi-unit hydrophones
- Armament: 6 × torpedo tubes (four bow, two stern); 22 × 53.3 cm (21 in) torpedoes; 1 × 3.7 cm (1.5 in) SK C/30; 1 × 2 cm (0.79 in) C/30 anti-aircraft gun

Service record
- Part of: 4th U-boat Flotilla; 2 June – 31 December 1943; 10th U-boat Flotilla; 1 January – 9 November 1944; 33rd U-boat Flotilla; 10 November 1944 – 24 April 1945
- Identification codes: M 51 791
- Commanders: Kptlt. Paul Just; 2 June 1943 – 24 April 1945
- Operations: 3 patrols: 1st patrol: 26 January – 23 April 1944; 2nd patrol: 15 June – 11 November 1944; 3rd patrol: 11 March – 24 April 1945
- Victories: 1 warship sunk (1,200 tons)

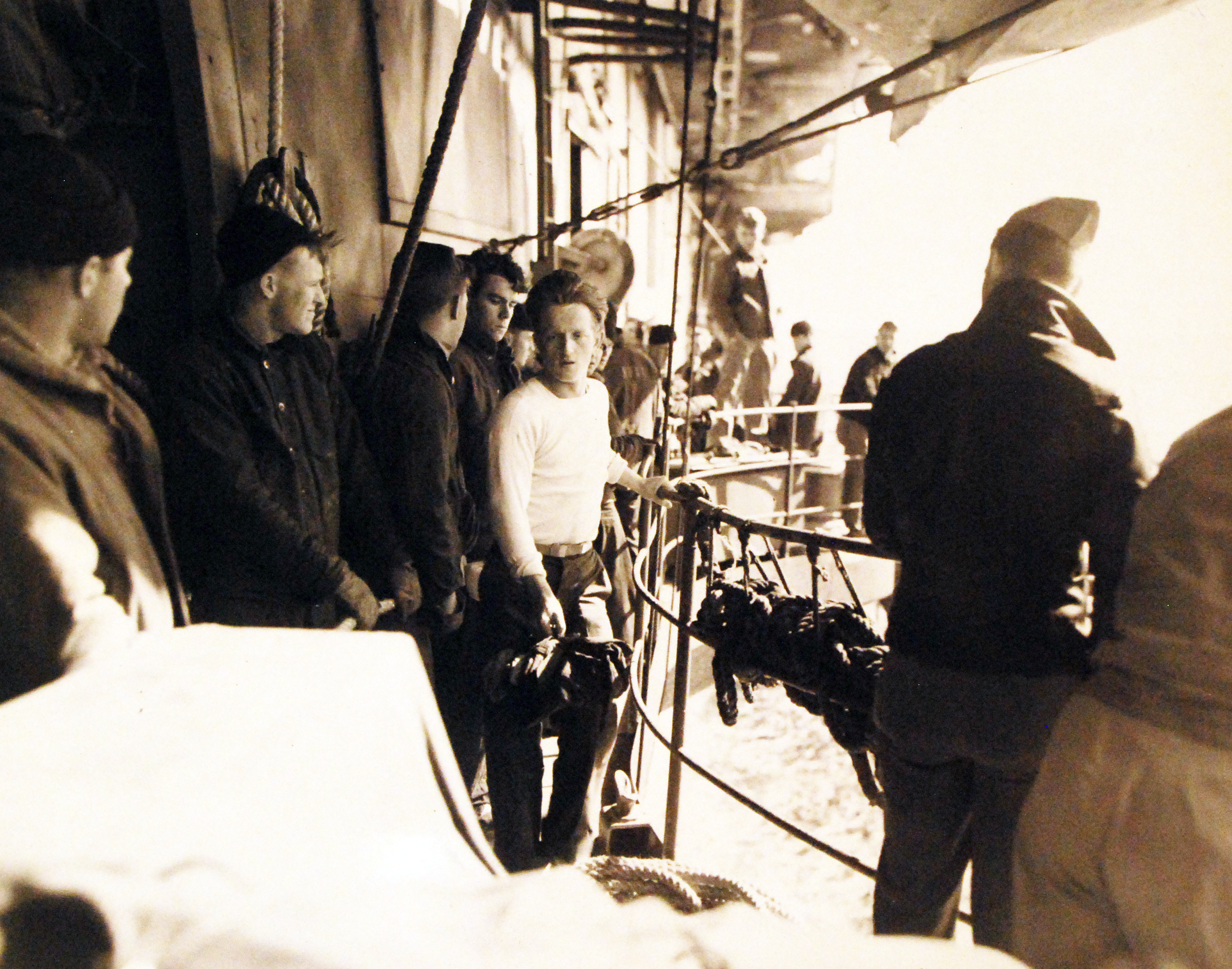
U-546 survivor on USS Bogue

German submarine U-546 was a Type IXC/40 U-boat operated by Nazi Germany's Kriegsmarine during World War II. She was laid down at the Deutsche Werft in Hamburg as yard number 367 on 6 August 1942, launched on 17 March 1943 and commissioned on 2 June 1943 under Oberleutnant zur See Paul Just. The U-boat was a member of three wolfpacks.

U-546 was responsible for the last combat sinking of a United States Navy vessel in the Atlantic Theatre, during Operation Teardrop. On 24 April 1945 U-546 sank the destroyer escort USS Frederick C. Davis, but was in turn sunk by combined fire of five other US destroyers. Her captain and most of her crew were rescued by US vessels, and taken to Argentia Naval Station. It was from this crew that the USN eventually learned that no V-1/2 attacks from the U-boats were planned by the Kriegsmarine.

== Design ==
German Type IXC/40 submarines were slightly larger than the original Type IXCs. U-546 had a displacement of 1,144 tonnes (1,126 long tons) when at the surface and 1,257 tonnes (1,237 long tons) while submerged. The U-boat had a total length of 76.76 m (251 ft 10 in), a pressure hull length of 58.75 m (192 ft 9 in), a beam of 6.86 m (22 ft 6 in), a height of 9.60 m (31 ft 6 in), and a draught of 4.67 m (15 ft 4 in). The submarine was powered by two MAN M 9 V 40/46 supercharged four-stroke, nine-cylinder diesel engines producing a total of 4,400 metric horsepower (3,240 kW; 4,340 shp) for use while surfaced, two Siemens-Schuckert 2 GU 345/34 double-acting electric motors producing a total of 1,000 shaft horsepower (1,010 PS; 750 kW) for use while submerged. She had two shafts and two 1.92 m (6 ft) propellers. The boat was capable of operating at depths of up to 230 metres (750 ft).

The submarine had a maximum surface speed of 18.3 knots (33.9 km/h; 21.1 mph) and a maximum submerged speed of 7.3 knots (13.5 km/h; 8.4 mph). When submerged, the boat could operate for 63 nautical miles (117 km; 72 mi) at 4 knots (7.4 km/h; 4.6 mph); when surfaced, she could travel 13,850 nautical miles (25,650 km; 15,940 mi) at 10 knots (19 km/h; 12 mph). U-546 was fitted with six 53.3 cm (21 in) torpedo tubes (four fitted at the bow and two at the stern), 22 torpedoes, one 10.5 cm (4.13 in) SK C/32 naval gun, 180 rounds, and a 3.7 cm (1.5 in) SK C/30 as well as a 2 cm (0.79 in) C/30 anti-aircraft gun. The boat had a complement of forty-eight.

== Sensors ==
=== Radar ===
U-546 was one of the few U-boats that was fitted with a FuMO 61 Hohentwiel U Radar Transmitter. It was installed on the starboard side of the conning tower.

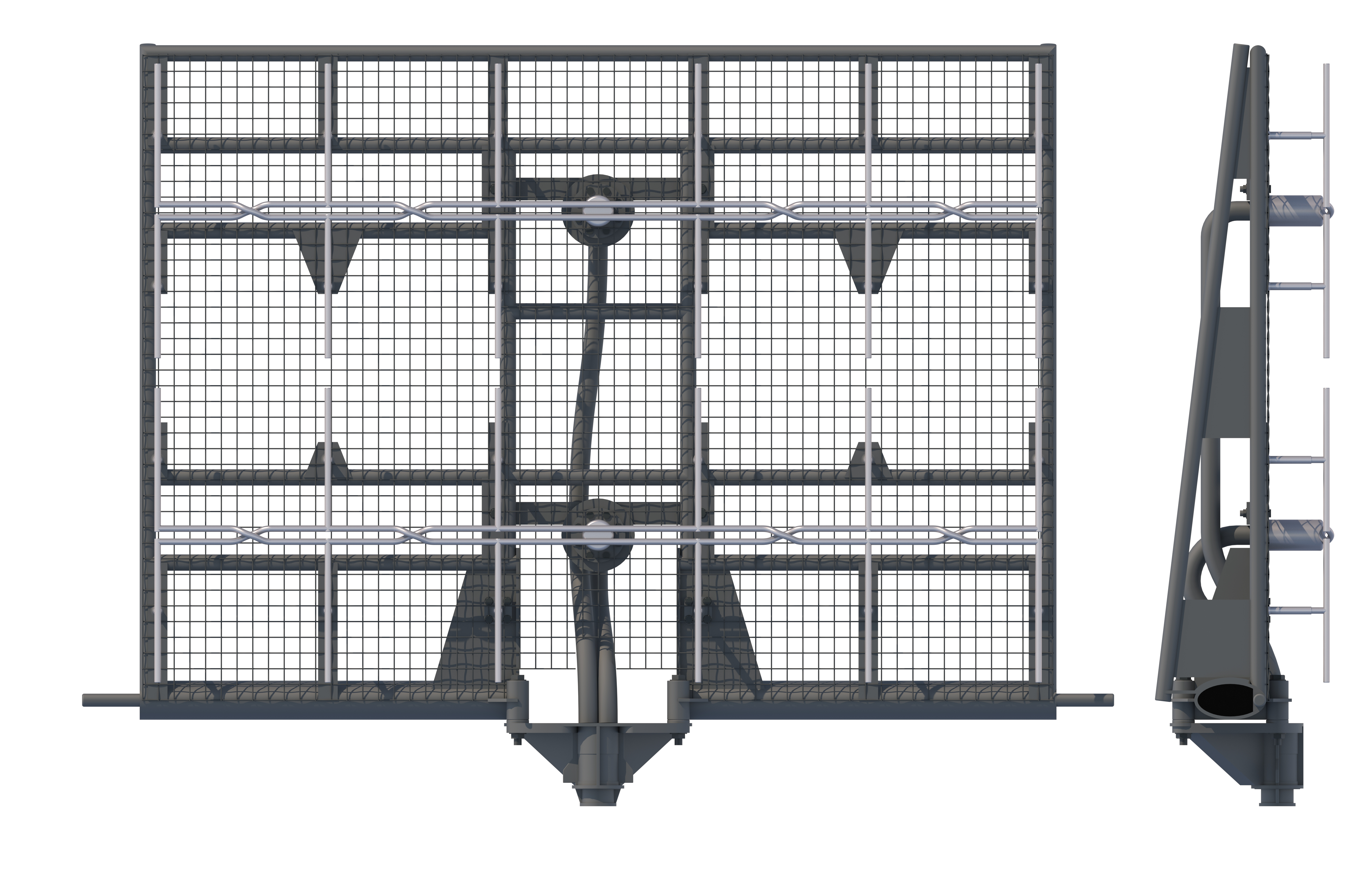
FuMO-61 Hohentwiel U Radar Transmitter

=== Radar Detection ===
U-546 was fixed with the FuMB-26 Tunis antenne. The FuMB 26 Tunis combined the FuMB Ant. 24 Fliege and FuMB Ant. 25 Cuba II antennas. It could be mounted in either the Direction Finder Antenna Loop and separately on the bridge.

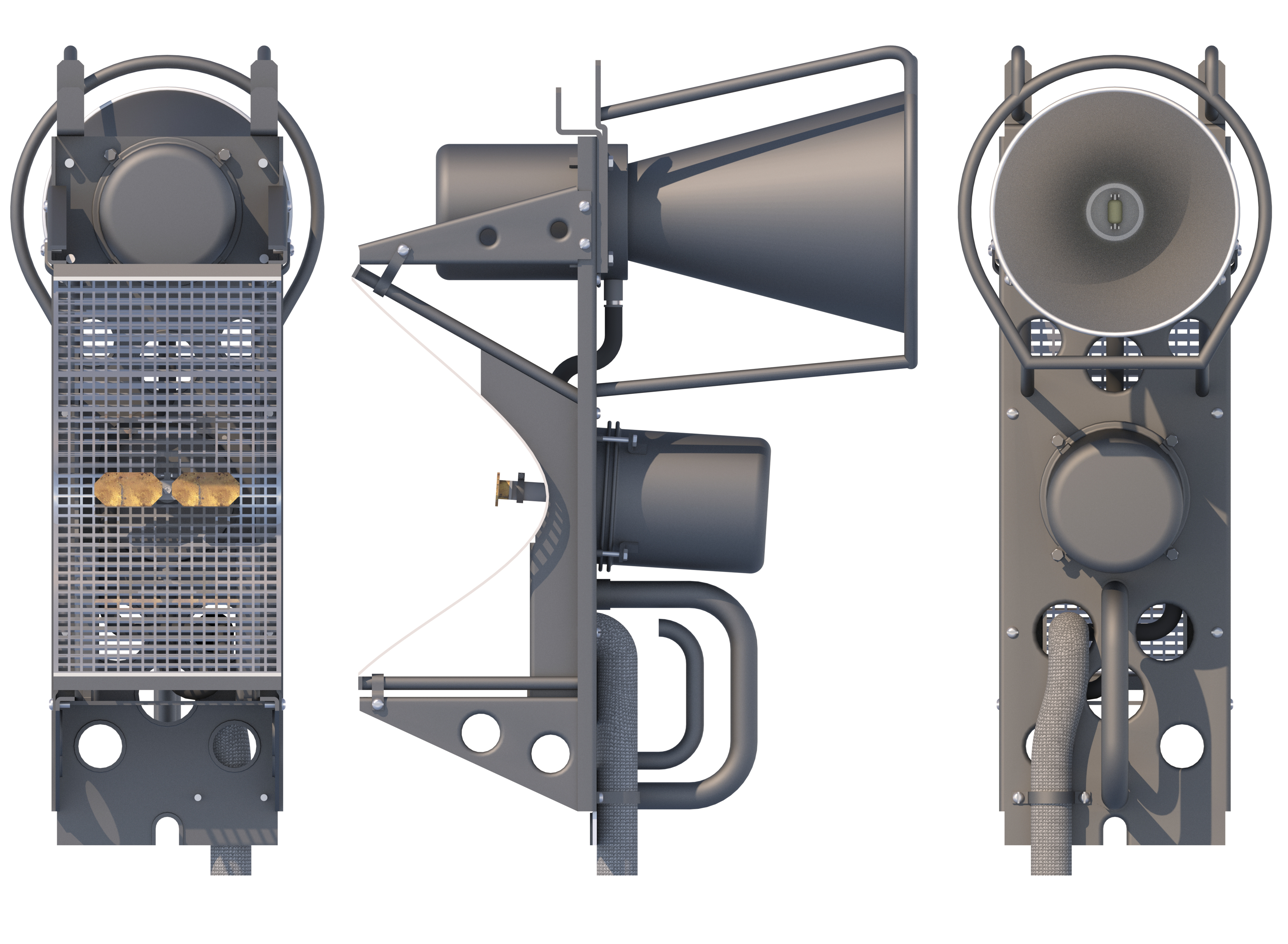
FuMB-26 Tunis Radar Detection.

== Service history ==
She commenced her training on 2 June 1943, making her first silent run at Sønderborg, she remained with the 4th U-boat Flotilla (training) at Stettin until 31 December 1943. She completed her training with a voyage from Hela to Swinemünde to practice A.A. cannon fire.

=== First patrol ===
The boat was reassigned to the 10th U-boat Flotilla for combat duties in the Atlantic on 1 January 1944, departing Kiel on 22 January 1944, with a three-day stopover at Marvika in Norway. After forming up with the Gruppe Igel 1 (Group Hedgehog) north-west of Scotland on 3 February 1944, U-546 commenced a patrol in the North Atlantic with other boats to the west of Ireland on anti-convoy duties. At 12:29 on 16 February U-546 reported she had been attacked by a British Sunderland flying boat from No. 201 Squadron RAF, killing one crewman. On 20 February 1944 she was again attacked by an aircraft. On 17 April while returning to base in France, the U-boat was caught on the surface by a Leigh light -equipped Liberator of 53 Squadron in the Bay of Biscay, steaming south-east, ahead of convoy HX 278 and was attacked with depth charges, but ended up shooting down the attacker with the 3.7 cm gun. She returned to Lorient for service and refit on 23 or 25 April 1944. The crew was given leave while the boat was overhauled and the Schnorchel was fitted.

=== Second patrol ===
Leaving her base again on 15 June 1944 for her second patrol to the African Gold Coast, she was detected by a USN anti-submarine patrol, which begun to hunt her. She soon had to abort her patrol and was ordered to return to Germany after the invasion of Normandy. On 18 June 1944 U-546 was attacked, again by a Sunderland, which was not equipped with radar. The boat then briefly returned to France on 22 June to replenish her cannon ammunition, sailing again on 25 June. On 20 July 1944 she was detected by USN surface ships forming the escort for an escort carrier; U-546 fired a torpedo at the carrier, but missed and was subjected to three hours of depth charge attacks from the escort destroyers. She managed to escape this attack. U-546 was then ordered to patrol a zone near Cape Verde where she operated for about four weeks, attacking a convoy with a spread of three torpedoes, but scoring no hits.

During the second patrol due to fuel shortages the captain achieved significant fuel saving and extended the cruise to 150 days (the boat's longest patrol), by floating submerged for days on water-layers with all engines stopped. The boat returned to base with 30 metric tons of fuel left.

=== Third patrol ===
On 10 November 1944 U-546 was reassigned to the 33rd U-boat Flotilla based at Flensburg, where she received a 14-day overhaul, eventually departing Kristiansand in Norway, on 2 March 1945. The boat proceeded to the eastern coast of North America on 10 March 1945 with six companions. In mid-April the group was ordered to commence operations individually. On 23 April the submarine was spotted surfacing north-west of the Azores by aircraft from USS Bogue as part of Operation Teardrop. The planes were looking for U-boats carrying V-1 flying bombs and V-2 rockets, which intelligence suggested were going to be used to attack American cities. Depth charges were dropped just after the boat submerged, but failed to damage her hull.

=== Sinking ===
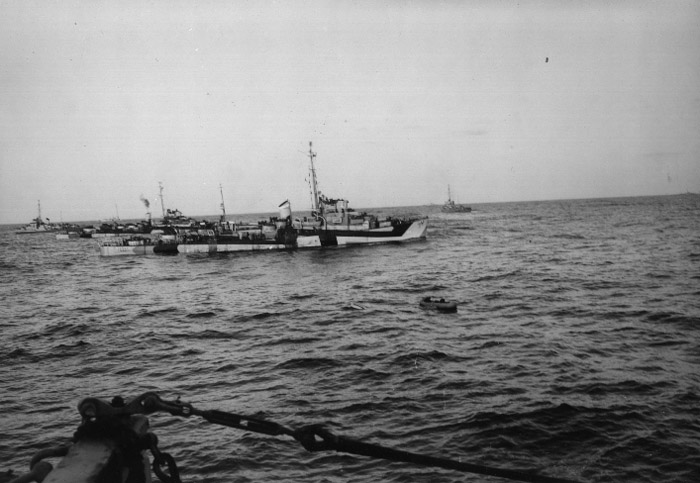
Survivors of the sinking of U-546 in a life raft just before being rescued

On 24 April 1945, U-546 made contact with the destroyer escort USS Frederick C. Davis and proceeded to attack, firing a stern torpedo. The destroyer escort turned into the torpedo and was hit, which tore her hull apart and sent her down with heavy loss of life.

The U-boat was in turn pursued by other destroyer escorts; Flaherty (DE-135), Varian (DE-798), Neunzer (DE-150), Hubbard (DE-211), Keith (DE-241), Chatelain (DE-149) , Janssen (DE-396), and Pillsbury (DE-133). Neunzer and Hayter (DE-212) conducted a search while Pillsbury circled the area and Flaherty picked up survivors. Flaherty made contact in less than an hour and with Pillsbury proceeded to attack. The U-boat went to 600 feet (180 m). Contact was lost from 10:45 until 12:01 when Varian, Janssen and Hubbard began another attack. Neunzer got into the fight after several attacks by the other DE's, delivering a creeping attack with Varian and Hubbard while Chatelain directed. Contact was lost once more at about 16:00, so Chatelain and Neunzer were ordered to return to the scouting line.

The line was expanded, the ships began a sweep through the area, determined to prevent the submarine's escape. Varian made contact once more at 17:31 and Flaherty was ordered to attack. She fired at 18:10. Four minutes later a small oil slick began coming to the surface. Flaherty made another Hedgehog attack at 18:28, and at 18:38 the U-boat broke the surface.

Every ship in the line within range began firing. At 18:44, after more than ten and a half hours of attacks, U-546 rolled under and sank (in position 43°53′N 40°07′W, south-south-east of Cape Farewell, Greenland). Her captain and most of her crew were rescued by US vessels, and taken to Argentia Naval Station, Newfoundland. Eight of the surviving, captured crewmen of U-546 were tortured by US military personnel. Historian Philip K. Lundeberg has written that the beating and torture of U-546's survivors was a singular atrocity motivated by the interrogators' need to quickly get information on what the U.S. believed were potential cruise missile or ballistic missile attacks on the continental US by German submarines. The USN eventually learned that no V-1/2 attacks from the U-boats were planned by the Kriegsmarine.

=== Wolfpacks ===
U-546 took part in three wolfpacks, namely:

- Igel 1 (9 – 17 February 1944)
- Hai 1 (17 – 22 February 1944)
- Seewolf (14 – 24 April 1945)

== Summary of raiding history ==
| Date | Ship Name | Nationality | Tonnage (Note: Merchant ship tonnages are in gross register tons. Military vessels are listed by tons displacement.) | Fate |
|---|---|---|---|---|
| 24 April 1945 | USS Frederick C. Davis | United States Navy | 1,200 | Sunk |

== Bibliography ==
- Busch, Rainer; Röll, Hans-Joachim (1999). German U-boat commanders of World War II : a biographical dictionary. Translated by Brooks, Geoffrey. London, Annapolis, Md: Greenhill Books, Naval Institute Press. ISBN 1-55750-186-6.
- Busch, Rainer; Röll, Hans-Joachim (1999). Deutsche U-Boot-Verluste von September 1939 bis Mai 1945 [German U-boat losses from September 1939 to May 1945]. Der U-Boot-Krieg (in German). Vol. IV. Hamburg, Berlin, Bonn: Mittler. ISBN 3-8132-0514-2.
- Gröner, Erich; Jung, Dieter; Maass, Martin (1991). U-boats and Mine Warfare Vessels. German Warships 1815–1945. Vol. 2. Translated by Thomas, Keith; Magowan, Rachel. London: Conway Maritime Press. ISBN 0-85177-593-4.
- Y'Blood, William T., Hunter-killer : U.S. escort carriers in the Battle of the Atlantic, Naval Institute Press, Annapolis, 1983.
- Syrett, David, Failure at Sea: Wolf Pack Operations in the North Atlantic, 10 February-22 March 1944 "The Northern Mariner", V, No. 1 (January 1995), 33–43.
