= USS Keith (DE-241) =

1942 Edsall-class destroyer escort

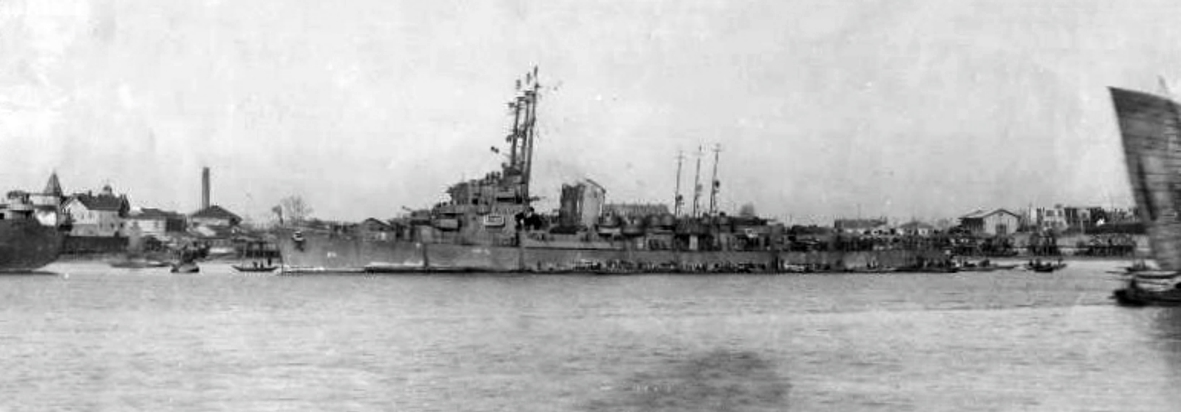

History

United States
- Name: USS Keith
- Namesake: Ellis Judson Keith
- Builder: Brown Shipbuilding Company
- Laid down: 1942
- Launched: 21 December 1942
- Commissioned: 19 July 1943
- Decommissioned: 20 September 1946
- Stricken: 1 November 1972
- Honors and awards: 1 × battle star for World War II service
- Fate: Scrapped, 1974

General characteristics
- Class & type: Edsall-class destroyer escort
- Displacement: 1,200 tons
- Length: 306 ft (93 m)
- Beam: 26 ft 7 in (8.10 m)
- Draft: 8 ft 7 in (2.62 m)
- Speed: 21 kn (39 km/h)
- Complement: 186
- Armament: 3 × 3 in (76 mm), 8 × 40 mm., 10 × 20 mm., 2 × depth charge tracks, 8 × K-gun depth charge projectors, 3 × 21 inch (533 mm) torpedo tubes

USS Keith (DE-241) was an Edsall-class destroyer escort in service with the United States Navy from 1943 to 1946. She was scrapped in 1974.

== Namesake ==
Ellis Judson Keith Jr. was born on 30 June 1919 at Houston, Texas. He entered the Navy as a Seaman Second Class on 2 October 1941. He was assigned as a radioman and gunner on a patrol plane that flew on aerial bombardments and strafing attacks on Japanese ships in the Aleutian Islands. He was killed in action during a mission over Kiska Harbor on 11 June 1942 and was posthumously awarded the Air Medal.

== History ==
Keith was originally laid down as Scott but renamed Keith on 8 December 1942, and was launched 21 December 1942 by the Brown Shipbuilding Company in Houston, Texas. Keith was sponsored by Mrs. Ellis J. Keith Sr., the mother of Seaman Keith; and commissioned 19 July 1943 at Houston, Texas.

=== Battle of the Atlantic ===
After shakedown and training exercises out of Bermuda, Keith sailed from Norfolk, Virginia 14 September 1943 on the first of three voyages escorting convoys from East Coast ports to Gibraltar.

After returning from convoy escort duty 22 February 1944, Keith underwent extensive refresher training and participated in antisubmarine warfare exercises before sailing on 15 March as part of escort carrier USS Tripoli's newly formed hunter-killer group. With this group she patrolled the Atlantic Ocean from Brazil to Newfoundland in search of enemy submarines.

In July, she joined a similar group operating with escort carrier USS Core. On 30 August, Core's hunter-killer group contacted an enemy submarine. Keith, assisting in the search, made two hedgehog attacks with inconclusive results.

Keith continued to operate with the hunter-killer group patrolling the waters of the Atlantic, escorting convoys from "mid-ocean point" to ports in Brazil, Bermuda, Newfoundland, Cuba, and the United States. On 23 April 1945, the hunter-killer group, operating as a combined force against a large wolfpack of U-boats, spotted a partially submerged submarine but could not locate it after it dived. While searching the next day, USS Frederick C. Davis, a destroyer escort in company, was torpedoed and sunk. Keith and a task group ships headed to the position where the Frederick C. Davis had gone down and launched a depth charge attack that lasted some 12 hours before U-546 was forced to surface. The destroyer escorts opened fire on the submarine; and Keith made two direct hits before the U-boat sank. After the engagement, Keith rescued four survivors from the submarine.

=== Pacific War ===
In mid-July, Keith departed Guantanamo Bay, Cuba, for duty in the Pacific Ocean. Keith found herself in Pearl Harbor at the end of hostilities with the Japanese and got underway for Saipan to perform escort duty and mop-up operations. Shortly after arriving, 31 August, she was assigned an air-sea rescue station between Iwo Jima and Japan. At the end of the year Keith sailed for China, arriving Shanghai on the last day of December. She remained there patrolling and escorting vessels until sailing for the United States on 10 April 1946 via Pearl Harbor and the Panama Canal arriving at Charleston, South Carolina on 15 May 1946.

=== Decommissioning and Fate ===
Keith was towed to Green Cove Springs, Florida, where she was decommissioned and placed in reserve 20 September 1946. By the late 1960s she was still in reserve and berthed at Orange, Texas being stricken from the Naval Vessel Register on 1 November 1972 and sold for scrap on 1 December 1973.

Keith received one battle star for World War II service.
