= USS Guadalcanal (CVE-60) =

US Navy Casablanca-class escort carrier in service 1943-1946

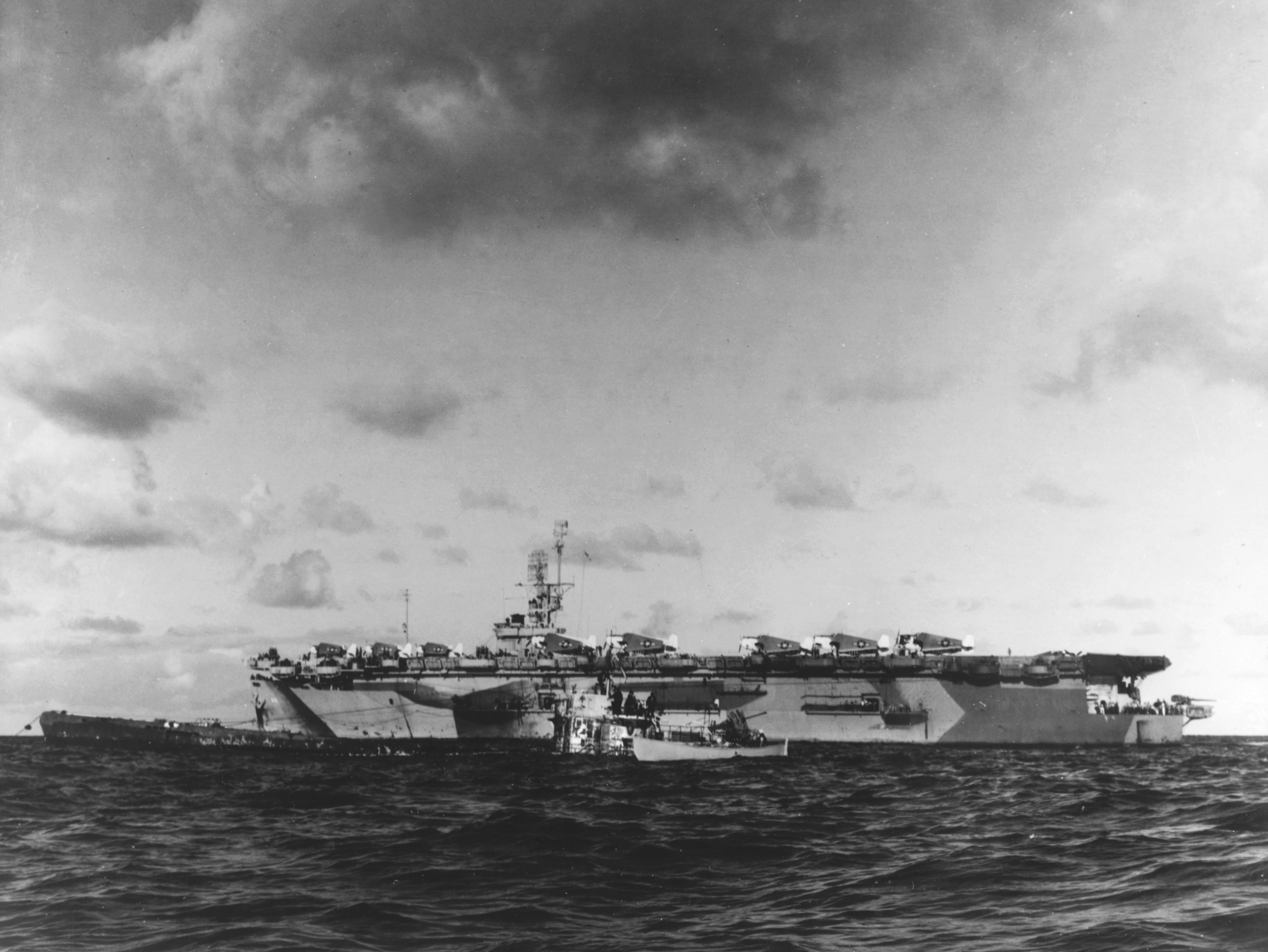
- USS Guadalcanal, 4 June 1944

History

United States
- Name: USS Guadalcanal
- Ordered: 1942
- Builder: Kaiser Shipyards
- Laid down: 5 January 1943
- Launched: 5 June 1943
- Commissioned: 25 September 1943
- Decommissioned: 15 July 1946
- Stricken: 27 May 1958
- Motto: Can do
- Fate: Sold for scrap on 30 April 1959

General characteristics
- Class & type: Casablanca-class escort carrier
- Displacement: 7,800 tons
- Length: 512 ft (156 m) overall
- Beam: 65 ft (20 m)
- Draft: 22 ft 6 in (6.86 m)
- Propulsion: 2 × 5-cylinder reciprocating Skinner unaflow engines; 4 × 285 psi boilers; 2 shafts; 9,000 shp
- Speed: 19 knots (35 km/h)
- Range: 10,240 nmi (18,960 km) @ 15 kn (28 km/h)
- Complement: 910-916 officers and men; Embarked Squadron: 50-56 officers and men; Ship's Crew: 860 officers and men.
- Armament: 1 × 5 in/38 cal dual purpose gun, 16 × Bofors 40 mm guns (8×2), 20 × Oerlikon 20 mm cannons (20×1)
- Aircraft carried: 27

Service record
- Part of: Task Group 21.12 (1943-44); Task Group 22.3 (1944-45); Atlantic Reserve Fleet (1946-58)
- Commanders: Daniel V. Gallery
- Operations: Battle of the Atlantic
- Victories: U-544, U-515, U-68, U-505 (1944)
- Awards: Presidential Unit Citation, 3 Battle stars

USS Guadalcanal (CVE-60) was a Casablanca-class escort carrier of the United States Navy, which served during and after World War II. She was the first ship to carry her name. She was the flagship of Task Group 22.3, a hunter-killer group which captured the German submarine U-505 in 1944.

== Design and description ==
A side profile of the design of Thetis Bay.

Guadalcanal was a Casablanca-class escort carrier, the most numerous type of aircraft carriers ever built. Built to stem heavy losses during the Battle of the Atlantic, they came into service in late 1943, by which time the U-boat threat was already in retreat. Although some did see service in the Atlantic, the majority were utilized in the Pacific, ferrying aircraft, providing logistics support, and conducting close air support for the island-hopping campaigns. The Casablanca-class carriers were built on the standardized Type S4-S2-BB3 hull, a lengthened variant of the Doyen-class hull, and specifically designed to be mass-produced using welded prefabricated sections. This allowed them to be produced at unprecedented speeds: the final ship of her class, Munda, was delivered to the Navy just 101 days after the laying of her keel.

Guadalcanal was 512 ft 3 in (156.13 m) long overall (490 ft (150 m) at the waterline), had a beam of 65 ft 2 in (19.86 m), and a draft of 20 ft 9 in (6.32 m). She displaced 8,188 long tons (8,319 t) standard, which increased to 10,902 long tons (11,077 t) with a full load. To carry out flight operations, the ship had a 257 ft (78 m) hangar deck and a 474 ft (144 m) flight deck. Her compact size necessitated the installation of an aircraft catapult at her bow, and there were two aircraft elevators to facilitate movement of aircraft between the flight and hangar deck: one each fore and aft.

She was powered by four Babcock & Wilcox Express D boilers that raised 285 psi (1,970 kPa) of steam at 577 °F (303 °C). The steam generated by these boilers fed two Skinner Unaflow reciprocating steam engines, delivering 9,000 hp (6,700 kW) to two propeller shafts. This allowed her to reach speeds of 19 kn (35 km/h; 22 mph), with a cruising range of 10,240 nmi (18,960 km; 11,780 mi) at 15 kn (28 km/h; 17 mph). For armament, one 5 in (127 mm)/38 caliber dual-purpose gun was mounted on the stern. Additional anti-aircraft defense was provided by eight Bofors 40 mm (1.57 in) anti-aircraft guns in single mounts and twelve Oerlikon 20 mm (0.79 in) cannons mounted around the perimeter of the deck. By 1945, Casablanca-class carriers had been modified to carry twenty Oerlikon cannons and sixteen Bofors guns; the doubling of the latter was accomplished by putting them into twin mounts. Sensors onboard consisted of a SG surface-search radar and a SK air-search radar.

Although Casablanca-class escort carriers were intended to function with a crew of 860 and an embarked squadron of 50 to 56, the exigencies of wartime often necessitated the inflation of the crew count. They were designed to operate with 27 aircraft, but the hangar deck could accommodate much more during transport or training missions.

== Construction and commissioning ==
Guadalcanal was built using a converted United States Maritime Commission freighter hull by Kaiser Shipyards in Vancouver, Washington. Originally Astrolabe Bay (AVG-60), she was reclassified ACV-60 on 20 August 1942 and launched as Guadalcanal (ACV-60) on 5 June 1943, sponsored by Mrs. Alvin I. Malstrom. She was reclassified CVE-60 on 15 July 1943; and commissioned at Astoria, Oregon on 25 September 1943, Captain Daniel V. Gallery in command. After shakedown training in which Capt. Gallery made the first take off and landing aboard his new ship, Guadalcanal performed pilot qualifications out of San Diego, California, and then departed on 15 November 1943, via the Panama Canal, for Norfolk, Virginia, arriving on 3 December. There she became flagship of Task Group 22.3 (TG 22.3), and with her escort destroyers set out from Norfolk on 5 January 1944 in search of enemy submarines in the North Atlantic Ocean.

== First "Hunter-killer" cruise ==
World War II submarines had to run surfaced most of the time, and could not stay submerged for more than about 72 hours before having to surface to recharge batteries. But by 1944, U-boats dared not surface in daylight, because they would be spotted by patrolling aircraft. Patrols from escort carriers covered even the middle of the Atlantic. Surfacing at night was safer, because night flight operations from escort carriers were considered too dangerous. The best the escort carriers could do was substitute extra fuel tanks for depth charges on a Grumman TBF Avenger, so the plane could take off at sunset, fly around all night, and land at dawn. The U-boats would not know the plane was unarmed, and would not risk staying surfaced.

Gallery decided that Guadalcanal would try night operations. When Ultra intelligence revealed a planned U-boat refueling rendezvous 500 miles west of the Azores just before sunset on 16 January 1944, Guadalcanal stayed clear of the area until launching eight Avengers just before sunset to comb the rendezvous area. The Avengers found two U-boats engaged in refueling with another standing by, and dived out of the clouds to drop depth charges. All three submarines disappeared; but 32 survivors of U-544 were floating in a pool of oil. In their excitement to see the effects of their first successful attack, the Avenger pilots stayed aloft so long they returned to the carrier after sunset.

Aircraft recoveries were slow because of bad approaches in the gathering dusk. After four landed successfully, the fifth Avenger landed too far right and put both wheels into the gallery walkway with its tail fouling the flight deck. The flight deck crew was unable to move the Avenger; and the three remaining planes were running out of fuel in total darkness. Guadalcanal turned on the lights and urged the pilots to try landing on the left side of the flight deck. The nervous pilots came in too high, too fast, and too far to port until one of them desperately cut power, bounced, and landed inverted in the water off the port side. The plane guard destroyer rescued the three crewmen from the unsuccessful landing and the crewmen from the two remaining planes which were instructed to ditch.

No more night flying was attempted, and no more U-boats were discovered during daylight patrols. Gallery kept his flight deck crew busy training with the wrecked Avenger between flight operations. The Avenger was cabled to the ship so it wouldn't be lost; and the crew was timed with a stopwatch to see how long it took them to push it over the side. The plane would then be winched back aboard for another drill. After they could reliably clear the flight deck within four minutes, they were finally allowed to push the battered Avenger overboard with no cable attached. After replenishing at Casablanca, the Task Group headed back to Norfolk and repairs, arriving on 16 February.

== Second "Hunter-killer" cruise ==
Departing again with her escorts on 7 March, Guadalcanal sailed with newly assigned air group VC-58 to Casablanca and got underway from that port on 30 March with a convoy bound for the United States. After three weeks of daylight flights finding no U-boats, Guadalcanal attempted night flight operations under the full moon of 8 April 1944. Four fully armed Avengers were launched just before sunset with recovery scheduled for 22:30. One of the Avengers found U-515 recharging batteries on the surface northwest of Madeira, and forced the U-boat to submerge by dropping a stick of depth charges with U-515 silhouetted in a down-moon approach. Guadalcanal kept four Avengers aloft at all times through the night, and when U-515 attempted to surface to recharge batteries, she was repeatedly forced to submerge. Each sighting gave another fix on U-515's position; and Chatelain, Flaherty, Pillsbury, and Pope detected the U-boat with sonar at 07:00. The ships made coordinated attacks until U-515 was forced to the surface with depleted batteries and foul air at 14:00, and Kapitaenleutenant Werner Henke scuttled his ship.

Guadalcanal Avengers had detected a second U-boat about sixty miles away while holding down U-515; so they maintained patrols through the night of 9 April. U-68 was discovered at daybreak on 10 April recharging batteries on the surface 300 miles south of the Azores. Three Avengers attacked out of the dark western sky with depth charges and rocket fire. U-68 sank, leaving three lookouts swimming in the wreckage, but only Hans Kastrup survived to be rescued when destroyers arrived an hour later.

With the confidence gained through sinking two U-boats in the first two nights of flight operations, Guadalcanal continued night flight operations as the moon waned, and aircrew were well trained when the task group arrived safely at Norfolk on 26 April 1944. Guadalcanal's success encouraged other carriers to practice night operations.

=== Capture of U-505 ===
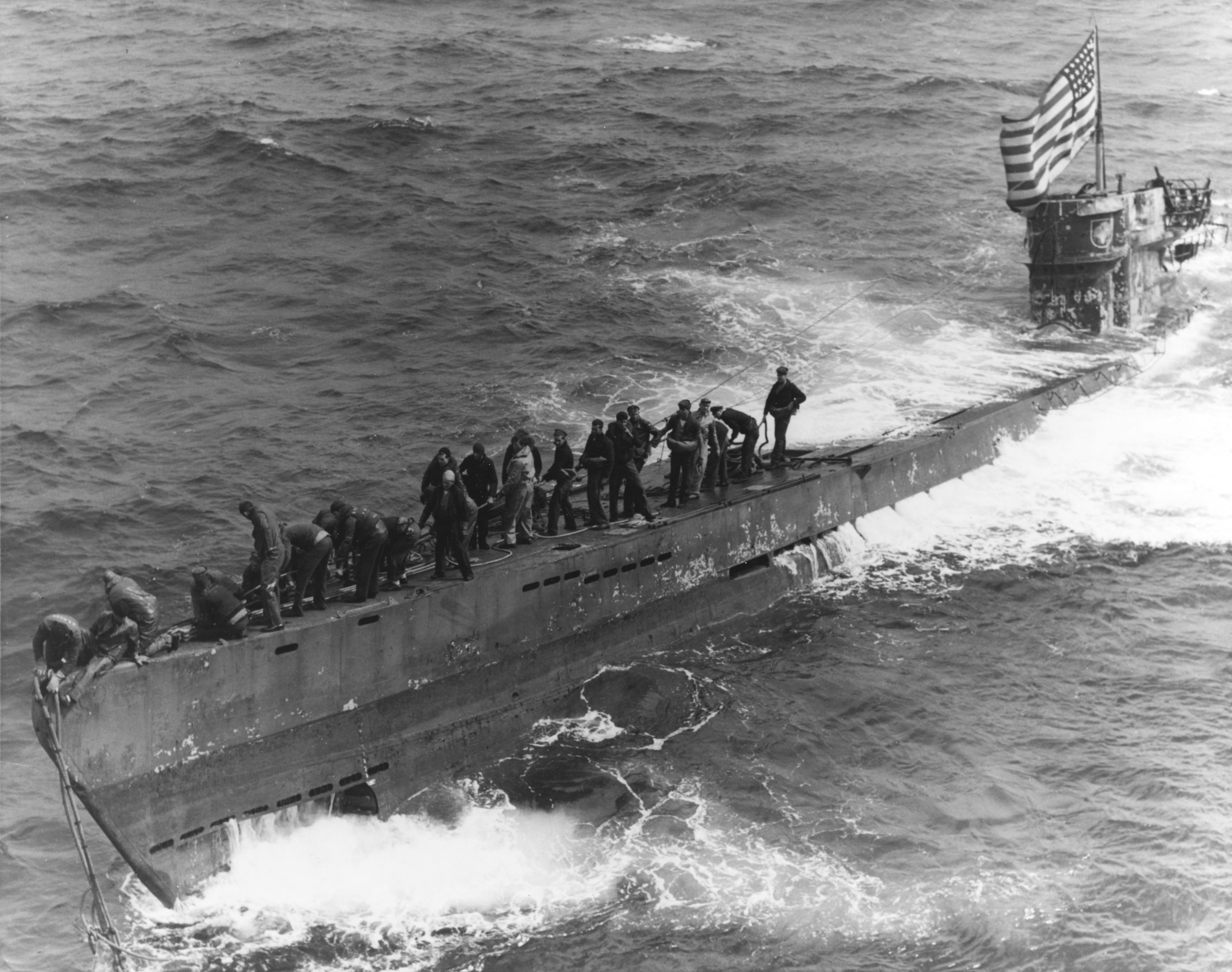
Newly captured U-505, 4 June 1944

After voyage repairs at Norfolk, Guadalcanal and her escorts departed Hampton Roads for sea again on 15 May 1944. Two weeks of cruising brought no contacts, and Gallery decided to head the Task Group for the coast of Africa to refuel. However, on 4 June 1944, ten minutes after reversing course 150 miles West of Cape Blanco in French West Africa, Chatelain detected U-505 as the u-boat was returning to her base after an 80-day patrol in the Gulf of Guinea. The destroyer loosed one depth charge attack; then made a second, more accurate drop, guided in by circling aircraft from Guadalcanal. This pattern blew relief valves all over the U-boat, cracked pipes in her engine room, and rolled her on her beam ends. Shouts of panic from the engine room led Oberleutnant Harald Lange, making his first patrol as her captain, to believe his boat was mortally wounded. To save his crew, he blew his tanks and surfaced, coming up barely 700 yards from Chatelain. The destroyer fired a torpedo, which missed, and the surfaced submarine then came under the combined fire of the escorts and aircraft as her crew abandoned ship.

Captain Gallery had been waiting and planning for such an opportunity, and had trained and equipped boarding parties. He ordered Pillsbury to send a boat with a boarding party to the U-boat. Under the command of Lieutenant, junior grade Albert David, the party leaped onto the slowly circling submarine and found her abandoned. Lt. David and his men quickly seized all important papers, code books, and the boat's Enigma machine while closing valves and stopping leaks. As Pillsbury attempted to get a tow-line on her the party managed to stop her engines. A larger salvage party from Guadalcanal arrived, led by Commander Earl Trosino, Guadalcanal's Chief Engineer, and prepared U-505 for towing. After securing the tow-line and picking up the German survivors from the sea, Guadalcanal started for Bermuda with her priceless prize in tow. The fleet tug USS Abnaki rendezvoused with the task group and took over towing duties. The group arrived in Bermuda on 19 June after a 2,500-mile tow. Trosino, a chief engineer in the civilian Merchant Marine before the war, had figured out the U-boat's engines, and wanted to bring her into port under her own power. Gallery refused permission; he later apologized to Trosino for doubting his skill.

U-505 was the first enemy warship captured on the high seas by the U.S. Navy since 1815. For their daring and skillful teamwork in this remarkable capture, Guadalcanal and her escorts shared in a Presidential Unit Citation. Lieutenant David received the Medal of Honor for leading the boarding party, and Captain Gallery received the Legion of Merit for conceiving the operation that led to U-505's capture. The captured submarine proved to be of inestimable value to American intelligence. For the remainder of the war she was operated by the U.S. Navy as the USS Nemo to learn the secrets of German U-boats. Her true fate was kept secret until the end of the war. U-505 is now an exhibit at the Museum of Science and Industry in Chicago.

Arriving in Norfolk on 22 June 1944, Guadalcanal spent only a short time in port before setting out again on patrol. She departed Norfolk on 15 July and from then until 1 December, she made three anti-submarine cruises in the Western Atlantic. She sailed on 1 December for a training period in waters off Bermuda and Cuba that included refresher landings for pilots of her new squadron, gunnery practice, and anti-submarine warfare drills with the old submarine USS R-9. Guadalcanal arrived at Mayport, Florida on 15 December, and was there employed in carrier qualifications of pilots, She subsequently engaged in further training activities in Cuban waters until 13 February 1945, when she returned to Norfolk. After another short training cruise to the Caribbean Sea, she steamed into Mayport on 15 March for another tour of duty as carrier qualification ship, later moving to Pensacola, Florida for similar operations. After qualifying nearly 4,000 pilots, Guadalcanal returned to Norfolk, and decommissioned there on 15 July 1946.

Guadalcanal entered the Atlantic Reserve Fleet at Norfolk and was redesignated CVU-60 on 15 July 1955, while still in reserve. She was finally stricken from the Naval Vessel Register on 27 May 1958 and she was sold for scrap to Hugo Neu Corp. of New York on 30 April 1959. She was being towed to Japan for scrapping when now-Rear Admiral Gallery made the very last landing and take-off from the ship, using a helicopter, off Guantanamo, Cuba.

== Awards ==
Guadalcanal was awarded three battle stars and a Presidential Unit Citation for service in World War II. Her Presidential Unit Citation was personally ordered by Admiral Ernest J. King, Chief of Naval Operations.

== Bibliography ==
- Adcock, Al (1996), Escort Carriers in Action - Warships No. 9, Carrollton, Texas: Squadron/Signal Publications, ISBN 9780897473569
- Chesneau, Robert; Gardiner, Robert (1980), Conway's All the World's Fighting Ships 1922–1946, London, England: Naval Institute Press, ISBN 9780870219139
- Friedman, Norman (1983), U.S. Aircraft Carriers: An Illustrated Design History, Annapolis, Maryland: Naval Institute Press, ISBN 9780870217395
- Gallery, Daniel V. (1965). Eight Bells and All's Well. New York: W.W. Norton & Company. OCLC 1376721. OL 5946337M.
- Gallery, Daniel V. (1969). "...Nor Dark of Night". Proceedings. Vol. 95, no. 4. United States Naval Institute. pp. 85–90.
- Ross, Al (1993), The Escort Carrier Gambier Bay, Anatomy of the Ship, London, England: Conway Maritime Press, ISBN 9781557502353
- Y'Blood, William (2012), The Little Giants: U.S. Escort Carriers Against Japan, Annapolis, Maryland: Naval Institute Press, ISBN 9781612512471
