= USS Chatelain =

Edsall-class destroyer escort

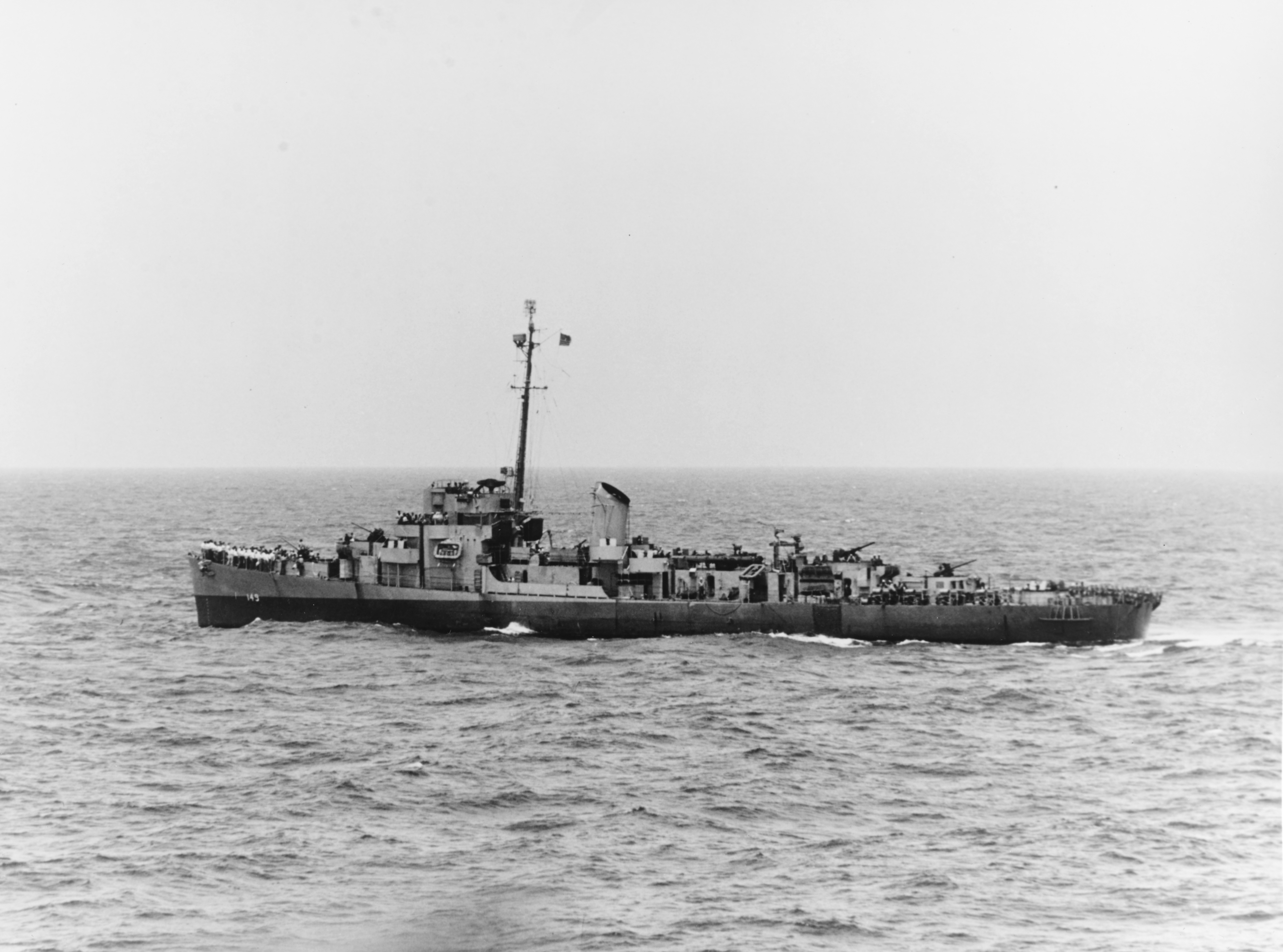
- USS Chatelain (DE-149) on 4 June 1944

History

United States
- Namesake: Hubert Paul Chatelain
- Builder: Consolidated Steel Corporation, Orange, Texas
- Laid down: 25 January 1943
- Launched: 21 April 1943
- Commissioned: 22 September 1943
- Decommissioned: 14 June 1946
- Stricken: 1 August 1973
- Honours and awards: 5 battle stars plus the Presidential Unit Citation
- Fate: Sold for scrapping 24 June 1974

General characteristics
- Class & type: Edsall-class destroyer escort
- Displacement: 1,253 tons standard; 1,590 tons full load
- Length: 306 feet (93.27 m)
- Beam: 36.58 feet (11.15 m)
- Draft: 10.42 full load feet (3.18 m)
- Propulsion: 4 FM diesel engines, 4 diesel-generators, 6,000 shp (4.5 MW), 2 screws
- Speed: 21 knots (39 km/h)
- Range: 9,100 nmi. at 12 knots; (17,000 km at 22 km/h)
- Complement: 8 officers, 201 enlisted
- Armament: 3 × single 3 in (76 mm)/50 guns; 1 × twin 40 mm AA guns; 8 × single 20 mm AA guns; 1 × triple 21 in (533 mm) torpedo tubes; 8 × depth charge projectors; 1 × depth charge projector (hedgehog); 2 × depth charge tracks

USS Chatelain (DE-149) was an Edsall-class destroyer escort in service with the United States Navy from 1943 to 1946. She was finally scrapped in 1974.

== History ==
She was named in honor of Hubert Paul Chatelain who was awarded a Silver Star posthumously for his valiant actions before he was killed in action 26 October 1942 during the Battle of the Santa Cruz Islands.

Chatelain (DE-149) was launched 21 April 1943 by Consolidated Steel Corp. of Orange, Texas; sponsored by Mrs. L. T. Chatelain; commissioned 22 September 1943 and reported to the Atlantic Fleet.

=== Battle of the Atlantic ===
Destined to play an important part in sweeping the Atlantic of German submarines, Chatelain escorted two convoys from east coast ports to Derry and Gibraltar between 20 November 1943 and 7 March 1944, and was then assigned to operate as part of the hunter-killer group formed around USS Guadalcanal (CVE-60). During the last year of the European war, while operating with the Guadalcanal group, Chatelain joined in the sinking of two German submarines, and the capture of a third.

==== Sinking of the German submarine U-515 ====
Her first action took place 9 April 1944, as her group sailed from Casablanca to the United States. U-515 was detected when her radio transmissions were picked up, and planes and ships of the task group pressed home a firm attack. Chatelain forced the enemy submarine to the surface with two depth charge attacks, then joined in the general firing at point-blank range which followed, sending U-515 to the bottom at 34°35′N 19°18′W.

==== Capturing the German submarine U-505 ====
On 4 June 1944, Chatelain had the distinction of initiating one of the most dramatic incidents of the war, when she made a sound contact, and hurled a barrage of hedgehogs at a U-boat. A second attack by Chatelain, this time with depth charges, holed U-505's outer hull and forced her to surface, her crew jumping overboard as she broke water. Now the task group seized its chance to carry out the boarding operation it had been planning for months, for the first capture by Americans of an intact German submarine. Successful in taking control of the submarine and executing the damage control that made its towing practicable, the group was awarded the Presidential Unit Citation for this action.

==== Sinking of German submarine U-546 ====
In one of the last antisubmarine actions of the Atlantic war, Chatelain took part in a 12-hour hunt for the submarine which had torpedoed USS Frederick C. Davis (DE-136) on 24 April 1945. Eight other ships joined her as the group again and again attacked U-546, sinking her finally at 43°53′N 40°07′W.

=== End-of-war decommissioning ===
Chatelain had patrol and convoy escort duty, as well as serving as plane guard during aviation exercises, until 20 November 1945, when she arrived at Charleston, South Carolina. She was decommissioned and placed in reserve at Green Cove Springs, Florida on 14 June 1946.

== Awards ==
In addition to the Presidential Unit Citation, Chatelain received five battle stars for World War II service.
