= USS Frederick C. Davis =

United States Navy destroyer escorter during World War II

Coordinates: 43°52′N 40°15′W

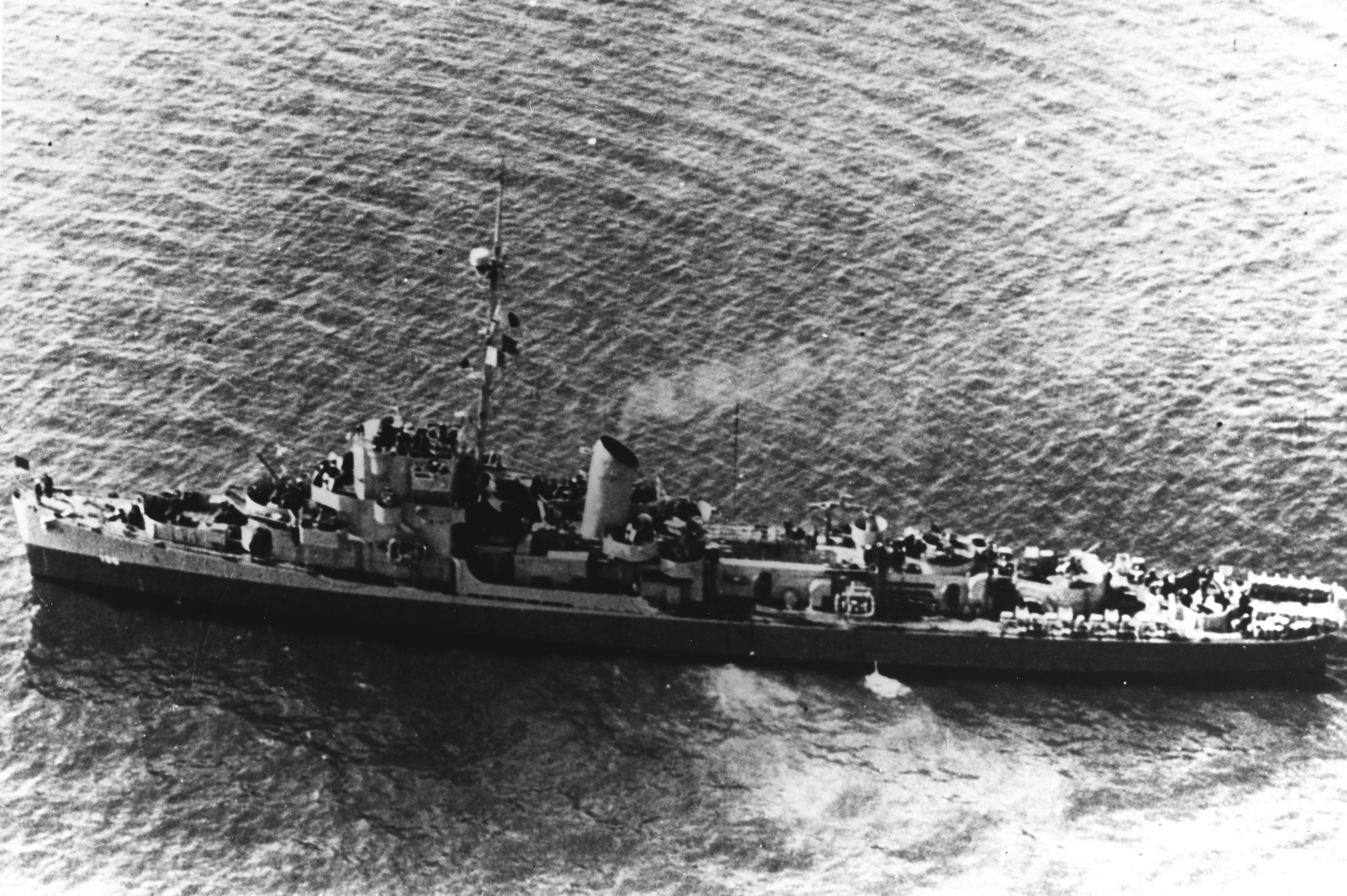
- USS Frederick C. Davis (DE-136) at sea

History

United States
- Name: Frederick C. Davis
- Namesake: Frederick Curtice Davis
- Builder: Consolidated Steel Corporation, Orange, Texas
- Laid down: 9 November 1942
- Launched: 24 January 1943
- Commissioned: 14 July 1943
- Fate: Sunk, 24 April 1945

General characteristics
- Class & type: Edsall-class destroyer escort
- Displacement: 1,253 long tons (1,273 t) standard; 1,590 long tons (1,620 t) full load
- Length: 306 ft (93.3 m)
- Beam: 36.58 ft (11.1 m)
- Draft: 10.42 ft (3.2 m) full load
- Propulsion: 4 FM diesel engines, 4 diesel-generators, 6,000 shp (4,500 kW); 2 screws
- Speed: 21 knots (39 km/h; 24 mph)
- Range: 9,100 nmi (16,900 km; 10,500 mi) at 12 knots (22 km/h; 14 mph)
- Complement: 8 officers, 201 enlisted
- Armament: 3 × single 3 in (76 mm)/50 guns; 1 × twin 40 mm AA guns; 8 × single 20 mm AA guns; 1 × triple 21 in (533 mm) torpedo tubes; 8 × depth charge projectors; 1 × depth charge projector (hedgehog); 2 × depth charge tracks

USS Frederick C. Davis (DE-136) was an Edsall-class destroyer escort built for the United States Navy during World War II. It was the last US Naval vessel lost in the Battle of the Atlantic.

== Namesake ==
Frederick Curtice Davis was born on 21 October 1915 in Rock County, Wisconsin. He graduated from the University of Wisconsin in early 1939. He enlisted in the United States Naval Reserve on 7 July, and began his primary flight training at Long Beach, California. He received his pilot's wings and was commissioned an ensign on 4 September 1940, after successfully completing instruction at the Naval Air Station, Pensacola, Florida.

He was assigned to the battleship USS Nevada, operating out of Pearl Harbor, Hawaii. Reporting to Observation Squadron One (VO-1), Battleship Division One he was board Nevada during the Japanese Attack on Pearl Harbor. With no aircraft on board at the time of attack, Davis ran forward to help load and command an anti-aircraft machine gun battery, until machine gun fire from strafing Japanese aircraft killed him. He was posthumously awarded the Navy Cross.

== History ==
Frederick C. Davis was laid down on 9 November 1942 by the Consolidated Steel Corporation of Orange, Texas that was launched on 24 January 1943, sponsored by Mrs. Dorothy H. Robins. The ship was commissioned on 14 July 1943. Frederick C. Davis sailed from Norfolk on 7 October 1943 to escort a convoy to Algiers. She was assigned to escort duty between North African ports and Naples, and on 6 November first came under enemy air attack. A wave of torpedo and medium bombers damaged three ships in her convoy but were driven off by the escort's anti-aircraft fire before further damage could be done. Again under air attack on 26 November, Frederick C. Davis splashed at least two of the enemy aircraft.

Continuing her escort duty in the western Mediterranean Sea, Frederick C. Davis took part in an attack on 16 December 1943 which resulted in the sinking of U-73 by two of her group. On 21 January 1944 the escort sortied from Naples for the Anzio landings, during which her superlative and courageous performance was to win her a Navy Unit Commendation. After providing protection from submarines and aircraft to ships giving fire support to the assault on 22 January, Frederick C. Davis maintained a patrol off the besieged beachhead for the next six months, leaving only for brief periods of replenishment at Naples. Equipped with special equipment to jam the control frequency of the enemy's rocket-propelled, radio-directed glider bombs, Frederick C. Davis fought off enemy air attacks, protecting shipping in the anchorage and the men enduring the fighting ashore. Particularly during the earlier stages of this bitter operation, Frederick C. Davis came under shellfire from shore batteries. Shrapnel caused slight damage to the ship, but only one man was wounded during this service.

After a return to escort duty in the Mediterranean in June and July 1944, Frederick C. Davis cleared Naples on 9 August for Corsica, her staging point for the assault on southern France. Here again she provided her special jamming services to protect the headquarters ship for the operation, USS Catoctin. She remained off the assault area on anti-submarine patrol and controlling shipping until 19 September, then returned to New York Navy Yard for overhaul.

=== Loss ===
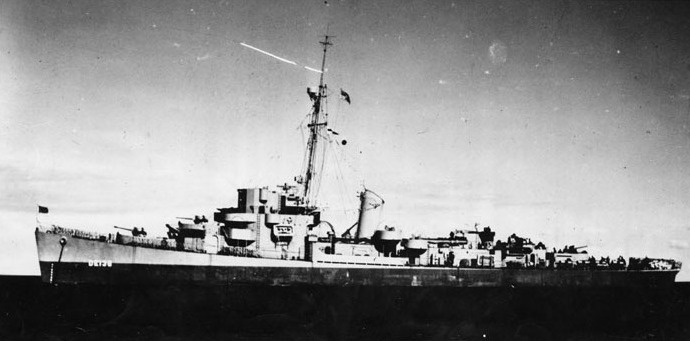
Participating in Operation Teardrop in the spring of 1945

Returning to duty in the western Atlantic early in 1945, Frederick C. Davis served on coastal convoy escort and anti-submarine patrol service and in mid-April joined a special surface barrier force, formed to protect the Atlantic coast from the threat of close penetration by snorkel-equipped German submarines during Operation Teardrop. It was one of these, U-546, which was contacted 24 April by Frederick C. Davis. Within minutes, as the destroyer escort prepared to attack, the submarine torpedoed her, hitting on the port side, forward. Five minutes later, Frederick C. Davis broke in two, and efforts to preserve the buoyancy of the stern, where the damage was less and the majority of survivors were located, failed. Her survivors abandoned the ship and were taken from the water within three hours, while 115 men were lost. The attacking submarine U-546 was sunk by the other US Navy escorts later that day with the surviving German crew being captured.

== Awards ==
- Navy Unit Commendation
- European-African-Middle Eastern Campaign Medal with three battle stars
- American Campaign Medal with one battle star
- World War II Victory Medal

== See also ==
- See List of U.S. Navy losses in World War II for other Navy ships lost in World War II.
- USS Davis for ships with a similar name.
