= Hunter-killer Group =

World War II groups of anti-submarine warships

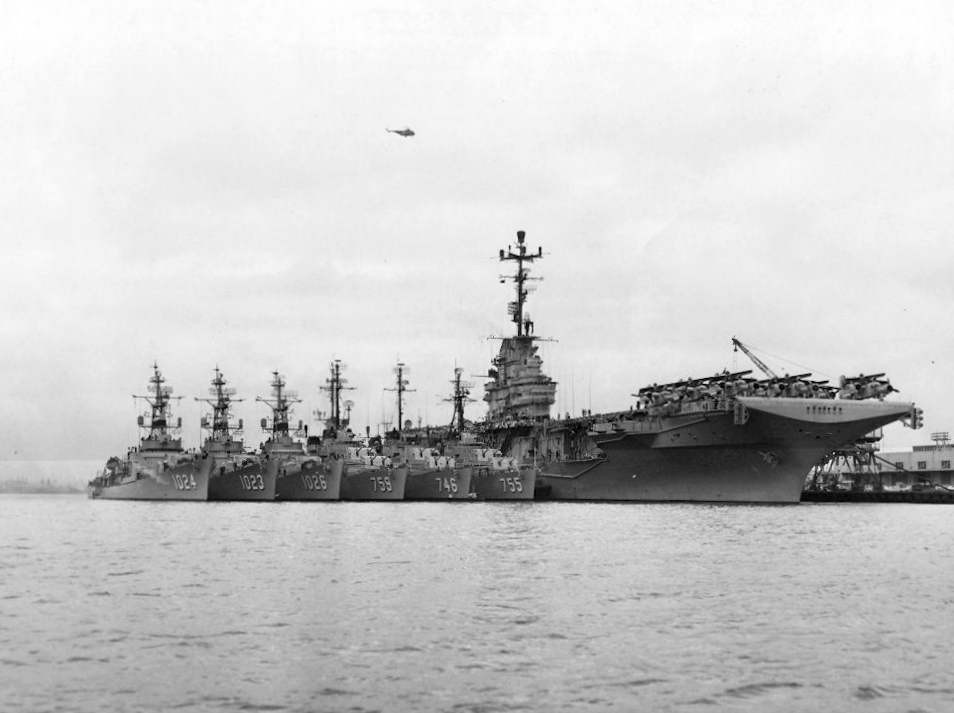
USS Kearsarge with the escorts of her hunter-killer group at San Diego in 1961

Hunter-killer Groups, also known as Convoy Support Groups, were groups of anti-submarine warships that were used to attack submarines during World War II. The advances in signals intelligence such as high-frequency direction finding (Huff−Duff), in cryptological intelligence such as Ultra, and in detection technologies such as radar and sonar/ASDIC enabled the Allied navies to form flotillas to hunt submarines and sink them. Similar groups also existed during the Cold War. A hunter-killer group would typically be formed around an escort carrier to provide aerial reconnaissance and air cover, with a number of corvettes, destroyers, destroyer escorts, frigates, and/or United States Coast Guard Cutters armed with depth charges and Hedgehog anti-submarine mortars.

== Predecessor ==
The Royal Navy initially used fleet carriers escorted by destroyers for hunter-killer groups. After Ark Royal was attacked by U-39 on 14 September, followed by the loss of HMS Courageous to U-29, these incidents prompted the Royal Navy to withdraw its fleet carriers from anti-submarine patrols.

== Origins ==
The concept was proposed in 1942 for the Royal Navy to organize groups of warships to reinforce the Escort Group accompanying a trans-Atlantic convoy. The Allied Atlantic Convoy Conference of early 1943 agreed to set up ten groups of anti-submarine warships with an escort carrier in each. Five Anglo-Canadian groups would cover the North Atlantic convoy routes and five US groups would cover the Middle Atlantic UG convoys. As increasing numbers of suitable ships became available to screen trade convoys, the faster ships were to be formed into mobile support groups which could provide rapid and heavy reinforcement of threatened convoys. These support group ships could focus on holding down and destroying submarines if freed of responsibility for returning to convoy screening stations. In early March, 1943, each Western Approaches escort group was to be reduced in strength by one frigate, sloop, or destroyer to form four support groups; and a half-flotilla of Home Fleet destroyers would form a fifth support group.

== Combat experience ==
In early April 1943 the 2nd Support Group of Black Swan-class sloops began operating along the Gibraltar convoy routes while sloops and River-class frigates of the 1st Support Group and O and P-class destroyers of the 3rd Support Group began responding to HX, SC, and ON convoys coming under attack. The first support groups with escort carriers were the fourth and fifth support groups of destroyers formed around HMS Archer and HMS Biter in late April. The first United States Navy support group was formed around USS Bogue with several Wickes and Clemson-class destroyers. About six ships were assigned to each support group, but damage and mechanical defects limited operational availability so only three or four ships from a group responded to most missions. The slower speed of 1st and 2nd Support Group ships limited their ability to travel with the other groups, but E and F-class, I-class, L and M-class, and O and P-class destroyers moved between the 3rd, 4th and 5th Support Groups from one mission to the next. Support groups without escort carriers were assisted by VLR patrol bombers. These early support groups made a significant contribution to the turning point battles known as Black May (1943). Many more support groups were created as production of anti-submarine warships and escort carriers exceeded the number required for screening convoys. These groups were able to shift Allied focus from defensive support of convoy screens to offensive operations hunting and destroying enemy submarines.

== Cold War preparations ==
As Cold War tensions increased, the United States Navy formed modernized hunter-killer groups in anticipation of potential use of Soviet submarines to intercept North American shipping to European NATO allies. As modern anti-submarine aircraft became too large to operate from escort carriers, Essex-class aircraft carriers were reclassified as anti-submarine warfare carriers (CVS). Some second world war destroyers were reclassified as escort destroyers (DDE) with guns and torpedoes replaced by RUR-4 Weapon Alpha or hedgehog. Operational doctrine anticipated each CVS would be accompanied by eight DDEs. Four DDEs would provide a close screen for the CVS while the other four attacked submarines detected by aircraft. The cost of Vietnam War combat operations prevented replacement of these ASW ships when they reached the end of their design life. Newly operational SOSUS and shore-based Lockheed P-3 Orion maritime patrol aircraft assumed the mid-ocean ASW search and attack role of the disappearing CVS hunter-killer groups.

== See also ==
- Escort Group
