= Karl Dönitz =

German grand admiral (1891–1980)

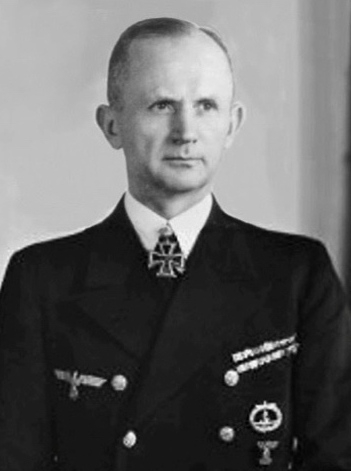
- Dönitz in 1943

President of Germany
- De Jure until 5 June 1945; 30 April 1945 – 23 May 1945
- Chancellor: Joseph Goebbels (Note: Until 1 May 1945)
- Leading Minister: Lutz von Krosigk (Note: From 2 May 1945)
- Preceded by: Adolf Hitler (as Führer)
- Succeeded by: Allied Control Council (as a Condominium) (Note: The Berlin Declaration, signed by the Allies on 5 June 1945, did not recognize Dönitz's civilian government; thus, they assumed supreme authority over Germany through the Allied Control Council.)

Minister of War
- In office 30 April 1945 – 23 May 1945
- Head of Government: Joseph Goebbels (Note: as Chancellor); Lutz von Krosigk (Note: as Leading Minister)

Chief of the German Navy High Command
- In office 30 January 1943 – 1 May 1945
- Deputy: Eberhard Godt
- Preceded by: Erich Raeder
- Succeeded by: Hans-Georg von Friedeburg

Personal details
- Born: 16 September 1891 Grünau, Brandenburg, Kingdom of Prussia, German Empire
- Died: 24 December 1980 (aged 89) Aumühle, Schleswig-Holstein, West Germany
- Resting place: Munich Waldfriedhof, Aumühle
- Party: Nazi Party
- Spouse: Ingeborg Weber (m. 1916; died 1962)
- Children: 3
- Cabinet: Hitler's cabinet; Goebbels cabinet; Flensburg Government
- Nickname(s): Der Löwe (The Lion); Onkel Karl (Uncle Karl)

Military service
- Allegiance: German Empire; Weimar Republic; Nazi Germany
- Branch/service: Imperial German Navy; Reichsmarine; Kriegsmarine
- Years of service: 1910–1918; 1920–1945
- Rank: Großadmiral
- Commands: SM UC-25; SM UB-68; Emden; 1st U-boat Flotilla; Führer der Unterseeboote; Befehlshaber der U-Boote; Oberkommando der Marine; Supreme Commander of the Wehrmacht
- Battles/wars: World War I; World War II; Battle of the Atlantic; Convoy Battles of World War II
- Awards: Knight's Cross of the Iron Cross with Oak Leaves
- Criminal information
- Convictions: Crimes of aggression War crimes
- Trial: Nuremberg trials
- Penalty: 10 years imprisonment

Details
- Imprisoned at: Spandau Prison

Karl Dönitz (German: [ˈdøːnɪts]; 16 September 1891 – 24 December 1980) was a German naval officer and politician who briefly succeeded Adolf Hitler as the head of state of Germany in the Nazi era after Hitler's suicide during the Second World War in April 1945. He held this position until the dissolution of the Flensburg Government, about two weeks after Germany's unconditional surrender to the Allies. As Supreme Commander of the Navy beginning in 1943, he played a major role in the naval history of the war.

He began his career in the Imperial German Navy before the First World War. In 1918, he was commanding UB-68, and was captured as a prisoner of war by British forces. As commander of UB-68, he attacked a convoy in the Mediterranean Sea while on patrol near Malta. Sinking one ship before the rest of the convoy outran his U-boat, Dönitz began to formulate the concept of U-boats operating in attack groups Rudeltaktik (German for "pack tactic", commonly called a "wolfpack") for greater efficiency, rather than operating independently.

By the start of the Second World War, Dönitz was supreme commander of the Kriegsmarine's U-boat arm (Befehlshaber der U-Boote [BdU]). In January 1943, he achieved the rank of Großadmiral (grand admiral) and replaced Grand Admiral Erich Raeder as Commander-in-Chief of the Navy. He was the main enemy of Allied naval forces in the Battle of the Atlantic. From 1939 to 1943, the U-boats fought effectively but lost the initiative from May 1943. He ordered his submarines into battle until 1945 to relieve the pressure on other branches of the Wehrmacht (armed forces). 648 U-boats were lost — 429 with no survivors. Furthermore, of these, 215 were lost on their first patrol. Around 30,000 of the 40,000 men who served in U-boats perished.

On 30 April 1945, following the suicide of Adolf Hitler and in accordance with his last will and testament, Dönitz was named Hitler's successor as head of state in what became known as the Goebbels cabinet after his second-in-command, Joseph Goebbels, until Goebbels's suicide led to Dönitz's cabinet being reformed into the Flensburg Government instead. On 7 May 1945, he ordered Alfred Jodl, Chief of Operations Staff of the Armed Forces High Command (German: Oberkommando der Wehrmacht (OKW)), to sign the German Instrument of Surrender in Reims, France, formally ending the War in Europe. Dönitz remained as head of state with the titles of President of Germany and Supreme Commander of the Armed Forces until his cabinet was dissolved by the Allied powers on 23 May de facto and on 5 June de jure.

By his own admission, Dönitz was a dedicated Nazi and supporter of Hitler. Following the war, he was indicted as a major war criminal at the Nuremberg trials on three counts: conspiracy to commit crimes against peace, war crimes, and crimes against humanity; planning, initiating, and waging wars of aggression; and crimes against the laws of war. He was found not guilty of committing crimes against humanity, but guilty of committing crimes against peace and crimes against the laws of war. He was sentenced to ten years' imprisonment; following his release, he lived in a village near Hamburg until his death in late December 1980.

== Early career and personal life ==
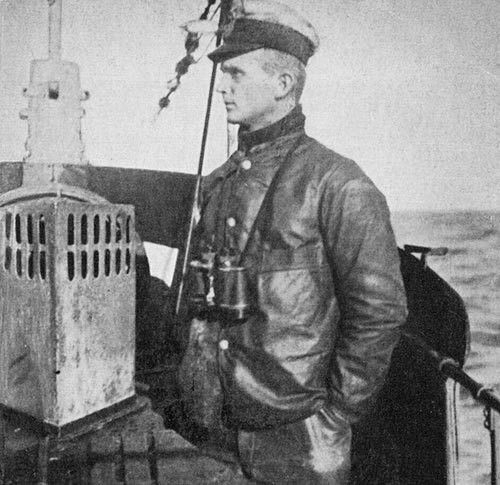
Oberleutnant zur See Karl Dönitz as Watch Officer of U-39 during World War I

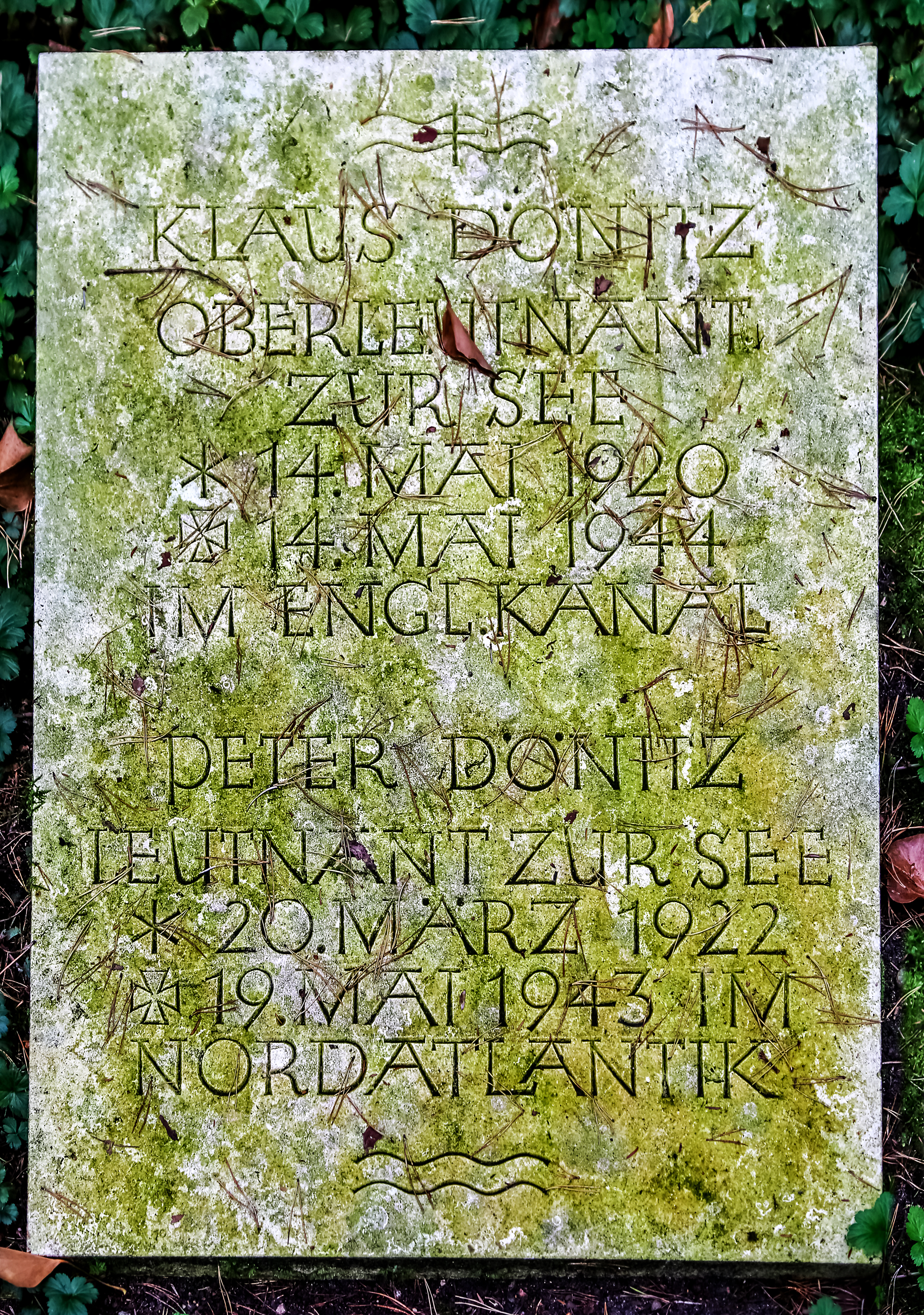
Commemorative plaque for Dönitz's sons, who both died in World War II: Leutnant zur See Peter Dönitz on 19 May 1943, as a watch officer on the U-954, and Oberleutnant zur See Klaus Dönitz on 13 May 1944, on the E-boat S-141

Dönitz was born on 16 September 1891 in Grünau, near Berlin, to Anna Beyer and Emil Dönitz, an engineer. Karl had an older brother. In 1910, Dönitz enlisted in the Kaiserliche Marine ("Imperial Navy").

On 27 September 1913, Dönitz was commissioned as a Leutnant zur See (acting sub-lieutenant). When World War I began, he served on the light cruiser SMS Breslau in the Mediterranean Sea. In August 1914, the Breslau and the battlecruiser SMS Goeben were sold to the Ottoman Navy; the ships were renamed the Midilli and the Yavuz Sultan Selim, respectively. They began operating out of Constantinople, under Rear Admiral Wilhelm Souchon, engaging Russian forces in the Black Sea. On 22 March 1916, Dönitz was promoted to Oberleutnant zur See. He requested a transfer to the submarine forces, which became effective on 1 October 1916. He attended the submariner's school at Flensburg-Mürwik and passed out on 3 January 1917. He served as watch officer on U-39, and from February 1918 onward as commander of UC-25. On 2 July 1918, he became commander of UB-68, operating in the Mediterranean. On 4 October, after suffering technical difficulties, Dönitz was forced to surface and scuttle his boat. He was captured by the British and incarcerated in the Redmires camp near Sheffield. He remained a prisoner of war until 1919 and in 1920, he returned to Germany.

On 27 May 1916, Dönitz married a nurse named Ingeborg Weber (1893–1962), the daughter of the German general Erich Weber (1860–1933). They had three children, whom they raised as Protestant Christians: a daughter named Ursula (1917–1990) and their sons Klaus (1920–1944) and Peter (1922–1943).

Both of Dönitz's sons were killed in action during World War II. Peter was killed on 19 May 1943 when U-954 was sunk in the North Atlantic with all hands. Hitler had issued a policy stating that if a senior officer such as Dönitz lost a son in battle and had other sons in the military, the latter could withdraw from combat and return to civilian life. After Peter's death, Klaus was forbidden to have any combat role and was allowed to leave the military to begin studying to become a naval doctor. However, on 13 May 1944, his 24th birthday, he persuaded his friends to let him go on the E-boat S-141 for a raid on Selsey. The boat was sunk by the French destroyer La Combattante and Klaus was killed.

== Interwar period ==
He continued his naval career in the naval arm of the Weimar Republic's armed forces. On 10 January 1921, he became a Kapitänleutnant (lieutenant) in the new German navy (Vorläufige Reichsmarine). Dönitz commanded torpedo boats, becoming a Korvettenkapitän (lieutenant-commander) on 1 November 1928. On 1 September 1933, he became a Fregattenkapitän (commander) and, in 1934, was put in command of the cruiser Emden, the ship on which cadets and midshipmen took a year-long world cruise as training.

In 1935, the Reichsmarine was renamed Kriegsmarine. Germany was prohibited by the Treaty of Versailles from possessing a submarine fleet. The Anglo-German Naval Agreement of 1935 allowed submarines and he was placed in command of the U-boat flotilla Weddigen, which comprised three boats; U-7; U-8 and U-9. On 1 September 1935, he was promoted to Kapitän zur See (naval captain).

Dönitz opposed Erich Raeder's views that surface ships should be given priority in the Kriegsmarine during the war, but in 1935 Dönitz doubted U-boat suitability in a naval trade war on account of their slow speed. This phenomenal contrast with Dönitz's wartime policy is explained in the 1935 Anglo-German Naval Agreement. The accord was viewed by the navy with optimism, Dönitz included. He remarked, "Britain, in the circumstances, could not possibly be included in the number of potential enemies." The statement, made after June 1935, was uttered at a time when the naval staff were sure France and the Soviet Union were likely to be Germany's only enemies. Dönitz's statement was partially correct. Britain was not foreseen as an immediate enemy, but the navy still held onto a cadre of imperial officers, which, along with its Nazi-instigated intake, understood war would be certain in the distant future, perhaps not until the mid-1940s.

Dönitz came to recognise the need for more of these vessels. Only 26 were in commission or under construction in the summer of 1935. In the time before his command of submarines, he perfected the group tactics that first appealed to him in 1917. At this time, Dönitz first expressed his procurement policies. His preference for the submarine fleet was for the production of large numbers of small craft. In contrast to other warships, the fighting power of the U-boat, in his opinion, was not dependent on its size, as the torpedo, not the gun, was the machine's main weapon. Dönitz had a tendency to be critical of larger submarines and listed a number of disadvantages in their production, operation and tactical use. Dönitz recommended the Type VII submarine as the ideal submarine. The boat was reliable and had a range of 6,200 nautical miles (11,500 kilometres). Modifications lengthened this to 8,700 nautical miles (16,100 kilometres).

Dönitz revived Hermann Bauer's idea of grouping several submarines together into a Rudeltaktik ("pack tactic", commonly called "wolfpack") to overwhelm a merchant convoy's escorts. Implementation of wolfpacks had been difficult in World War I owing to the limitations of available radios. In the interwar years, Germany had developed ultra-high-frequency transmitters, while the Enigma machine was believed to have made communications secure. A 1922 paper written by Kapitänleutnant Wessner of the Wehrabteilung (Defence Ministry) pointed to the success of surface attacks at night and the need to coordinate operations with multiple boats to defeat the escorts. Dönitz knew of the paper and improved the ideas suggested by Wessner. This tactic had the added advantage that a submarine on the surface was undetectable by ASDIC (an early form of sonar). Dönitz claimed after the war he would not allow his service to be intimidated by British disclosures about ASDIC and the course of the war had proven him right. In reality, Dönitz harboured fears stretching back to 1937 that the new technology would render the U-boat impotent. Dönitz published his ideas on night attacks in January 1939 in a booklet called Die U-Bootwaffe, which apparently went unnoticed by the British. The Royal Navy's overconfidence in ASDIC encouraged the Admiralty to suppose it could deal with submarines whatever strategy they adopted — in this they were proven wrong; submarines were difficult to locate and destroy under operational conditions.

In 1939, he expressed his belief that he could win the war with 300 vessels. The Nazi leadership's rearmament programme prioritised land and aerial warfare. From 1933 to 1936, the navy was granted only 13% of the total armament expenditure. The production of U-boats, despite the existing Z Plan, remained low. In 1935, shipyards produced 14 submarines, 21 in 1936 and 1 in 1937. In 1938, nine were commissioned and in 1939, 18 U-boats were built. Dönitz's vision may have been misguided. The British had planned for contingency construction programmes for the summer of 1939. At least 78 small escorts and a crash construction programme of "Whale catchers" had been invoked. The British, according to one historian, had taken all the sensible steps necessary to deal with the U-boat menace as it existed in 1939 and were well placed to deal with large numbers of submarines, prior to events in 1940.

== World War II ==
On 1 September 1939, Germany invaded Poland. Britain and France soon declared war on Germany, and World War II began. On Sunday, 3 September, Dönitz chaired a conference at Wilhelmshaven. At 11:15 am, the British Admiralty sent out a signal "Total Germany". B-Dienst intercepted the message and it was promptly reported to Dönitz. Dönitz paced around the room and his staff purportedly heard him repeatedly say, "My God! So it's war with England again!"

Dönitz abandoned the conference to return within the hour, a far more composed man. He announced to his officers, "We know our enemy. We have today the weapon and a leadership that can face up to this enemy. The war will last a long time, but if each does his duty, we will win." Dönitz had only 57 boats; of those, 27 were capable of reaching the Atlantic Ocean from their German bases. A small building program was already under way, but the number of U-boats did not rise noticeably until the autumn of 1941.

Dönitz's first major action was the cover up of the sinking of the British passenger liner Athenia later the same day. Acutely sensitive to international opinion and relations with the United States, the death of more than a hundred civilians was damaging. Dönitz suppressed the truth that the ship was sunk by a German submarine. He accepted the commander's explanation that he genuinely believed the ship was armed. Dönitz ordered the engagement to be struck from the submarine's logbook. Dönitz did not admit the cover up until 1946.

Hitler's original orders to wage war only in accordance with the Prize Regulations were not issued in any altruistic spirit but in the belief that hostilities with the Western Allies would be brief. On 23 September 1939, Hitler, on the recommendation of Raeder, approved an order that all merchant ships making use of their wireless upon being stopped by U-boats should be sunk or captured. This order marked a considerable step towards unrestricted warfare. Four days later, enforcement of Prize Regulations in the North Sea was withdrawn, and on 2 October, complete freedom was given to attack darkened ships encountered off the British and French coasts. Two days later, the Prize Regulations were cancelled in waters extending as far as 15° West, and on 17 October, the German Naval Staff gave U-boats permission to attack without warning all ships identified as hostile. The zone where darkened ships could be attacked with complete freedom was extended to 20° West on 19 October. Practically the only restrictions now placed on U-boats concerned attacks on passenger liners and on 17 November, they too were allowed to be attacked without warning if clearly identifiable as hostile.

Although the phrase was not used, by November 1939, the Befehlshaber der U-Boote (BdU) was practising unrestricted submarine warfare. Neutral shipping was warned by the Germans against entering the zone, which, by American neutrality legislation, was forbidden to American shipping, and against steaming without lights, zigzagging or taking any defensive precautions. The complete practice of unrestricted warfare was not enforced for fear of antagonising neutral powers, particularly the Americans. Admirals Raeder and Dönitz and the German Naval Staff had always wished and intended to introduce unrestricted warfare as rapidly as Hitler could be persuaded to accept the possible consequences.

Dönitz and Raeder accepted the death of the Z Plan upon the outbreak of war. The U-boat programme would be the only portion of it to survive 1939. Both men lobbied Hitler to increase the planned production of submarines to at least 29 per month. The immediate obstacle to the proposals was Hermann Göring, head of the Four Year Plan, commander-in-chief of the Luftwaffe and future successor to Hitler. Göring would not acquiesce and in March 1940, Raeder was forced to drop the figure from 29 to 25, but even that plan proved illusory. In the first half of 1940, two boats were delivered, increasing to six in the final half of the year. In 1941, the deliveries increased to 13 in June, and then to 20 in December. It was not until late 1941 that the number of vessels began to increase quickly. From September 1939 through to March 1940, 15 U-boats were lost — nine to convoy escorts. The impressive tonnage sunk had little impact on the Allied war effort at that point.

=== Commander of the submarine fleet ===
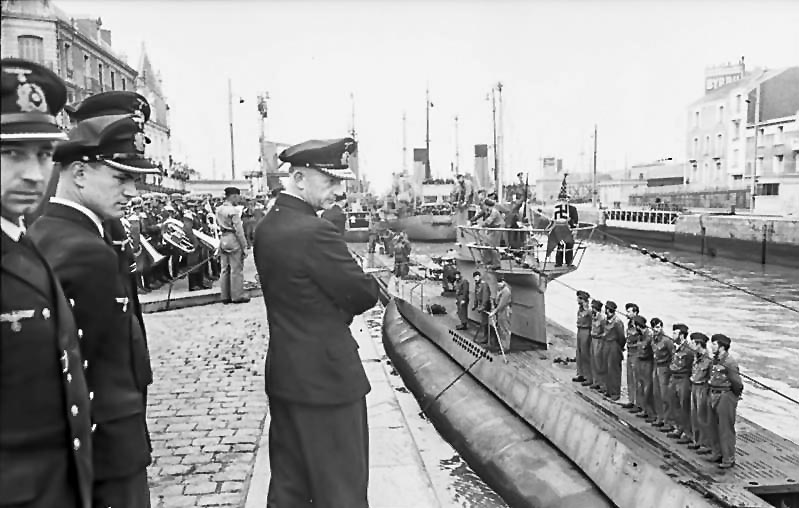
Dönitz observing the arrival of U-94 at Saint-Nazaire in France in June 1941

On 1 October 1939, Dönitz became a Konteradmiral (rear admiral) and "Commander of the Submarines" (Befehlshaber der Unterseeboote, BdU). For the first part of the war, despite disagreements with Raeder on where best to deploy his men, Dönitz was given considerable operational freedom for his junior rank.

From September until December 1939, U-boats sank 221 ships for 755,237 gross tons, at the cost of nine U-boats. Only 47 merchant ships were sunk in the North Atlantic, a tonnage of 249,195. Dönitz had difficulty in organising Wolfpack operations in 1939. A number of his submarines were lost en route to the Atlantic, through either the North Sea or the heavily defended English Channel. Torpedo failures plagued commanders during convoy attacks. Along with successes against single ships, Dönitz authorised the abandonment of pack attacks in the autumn. The Norwegian campaign amplified the defects. Dönitz wrote in May 1940, "I doubt whether men have ever had to rely on such a useless weapon." He ordered the removal of magnetic pistols in favour of contact fuses and their faulty depth control systems. In no fewer than 40 attacks on Allied warships, not a single sinking was achieved. The statistics show that from the outbreak of war to approximately the spring of 1940, faulty German torpedoes saved 50–60 ships equating to 300,000 GRT(Gross register tonnage).

Dönitz was encouraged in operations against warships by the sinking of the aircraft carrier Courageous. On 28 September 1939, he said, "It is not true Britain possesses the means to eliminate the U-boat menace." The first specific operation — named "Special Operation P" — authorised by Dönitz was Günther Prien's attack on Scapa Flow, which sank the battleship Royal Oak. The attack became a propaganda success, though Prien purportedly was unenthusiastic about being used that way. Historian Stephen Roskill wrote, "It is now known that this operation was planned with great care by Admiral Dönitz, who was correctly informed of the weak state of the defences of the eastern entrances. Full credit must also be given to Lieutenant Prien for the nerve and determination with which he put Dönitz's plan into execution."

In May 1940, 101 ships were sunk — but only nine in the Atlantic — followed by 140 in June; 53 of them in the Atlantic for a total of 585,496 GRT that month. The first six months in 1940 cost Dönitz 15 U-boats. Until mid-1940 there remained a chronic problem with the reliability of the G7e torpedo. As the battles of Norway and Western Europe raged, the Luftwaffe sank more ships than the U-boats. In May 1940, German aircraft sank 48 ships (158 GRT), three times that of German submarines. The Allied evacuations from western Europe and Scandinavia in June 1940 attracted Allied warships in large numbers, leaving many of the Atlantic convoys travelling through the Western Approaches unprotected. From June 1940, the German submarines began to exact a heavy toll. In the same month, the Luftwaffe sank just 22 ships (195,193 GRT) in a reversal of the previous months.

Germany's defeat of Norway gave the U-boats new bases much nearer to their main area of operations off the Western Approaches. The U-boats operated in groups or "wolf packs", which were coordinated by radio from land. With the fall of France, Germany acquired U-boat bases at Lorient, Brest, Saint-Nazaire, La Pallice/La Rochelle and Bordeaux. This extended the range of Type VIIs. Regardless, the war with Britain continued. The admiral remained sceptical of Operation Sea Lion, a planned invasion and expected a long war. The destruction of seaborne trade became German strategy against Britain after the defeat of the Luftwaffe in the Battle of Britain. Hitler was content with the Blitz and cutting off Britain's imports. Dönitz gained importance as the prospect of a quick victory faded. Dönitz concentrated groups of U-boats against the convoys and had them attack on the surface at night. In addition the Germans were helped by Italian submarines which in early 1941 actually surpassed the number of German U-boats. Having failed to persuade the Nazi leadership to prioritise U-boat construction, a task made more difficult by military victories in 1940 which convinced many people that Britain would give up the struggle, Dönitz welcomed the deployment of 26 Italian submarines to his force. Dönitz complimented Italian bravery and daring, but was critical of their training and submarine designs. Dönitz remarked they lacked the necessary toughness and discipline and consequently were "of no great assistance to us in the Atlantic."

The establishment of German bases on the French Atlantic coast allowed for the prospect of aerial support. Small numbers of German aircraft, such as the long-range Focke-Wulf Fw 200 Condor, sank a large number of ships in the Atlantic in the last quarter of 1940. In the long term, Göring proved an insurmountable problem in effecting cooperation between the navy and the Luftwaffe. In early 1941, while Göring was on leave, Dönitz approached Hitler and secured from him a single bomber/maritime patrol unit for the navy. Göring succeeded in overturning this decision and both Dönitz and Raeder were forced to settle for a specialist maritime air command under Luftwaffe control. Poorly supplied, Fliegerführer Atlantik achieved modest success in 1941, but thereafter failed to have an impact as British counter-measures evolved. Cooperation between the Kriegsmarine and Luftwaffe remained dysfunctional to the war's end. Göring and his unassailable position at the Reichsluftfahrtministerium (Air Ministry) prevented all but limited collaboration.

The U-boat fleet's successes in 1940 and early 1941 were spearheaded by a small number of highly trained and experienced pre-war commanders. Otto Kretschmer, Joachim Schepke, and Günther Prien were the most famous, but others included Hans Jenisch, Victor Oehrn, Engelbert Endrass, Herbert Schultze and Hans-Rudolf Rösing. Although they were skilled and had impeccable judgement, the shipping lanes they descended upon were poorly defended. The U-boat force did not escape unscathed. Within the space of several days in March 1941, Prien and Schepke were dead and Kretschmer was a prisoner. All of them fell in battle with a convoy system. The number of boats in the Atlantic remained low. Six fewer existed in May 1940 than in September 1939. In January 1941, there were just six on station in the Atlantic — the lowest during the war — while still suffering from unreliable torpedoes. Dönitz insisted that operations continue while "the smallest prospect of hits" remained.

For his part, Dönitz was involved in the daily operations of his boats and all the major operational level decisions. His assistant, Eberhard Godt, was left to manage daily operations as the war continued. Dönitz was debriefed personally by his captains, which helped establish a rapport between leader and led. Dönitz neglected nothing that would make the bond firmer. Often, there would be a distribution of medals or awards. As an ex-submariner, Dönitz did not like to contemplate the thought of a man who had done well heading out to sea, perhaps never to return, without being rewarded or receiving recognition. Dönitz acknowledged that, where decorations were concerned, there was no red tape and that awards were "psychologically important".

=== Intelligence battle ===
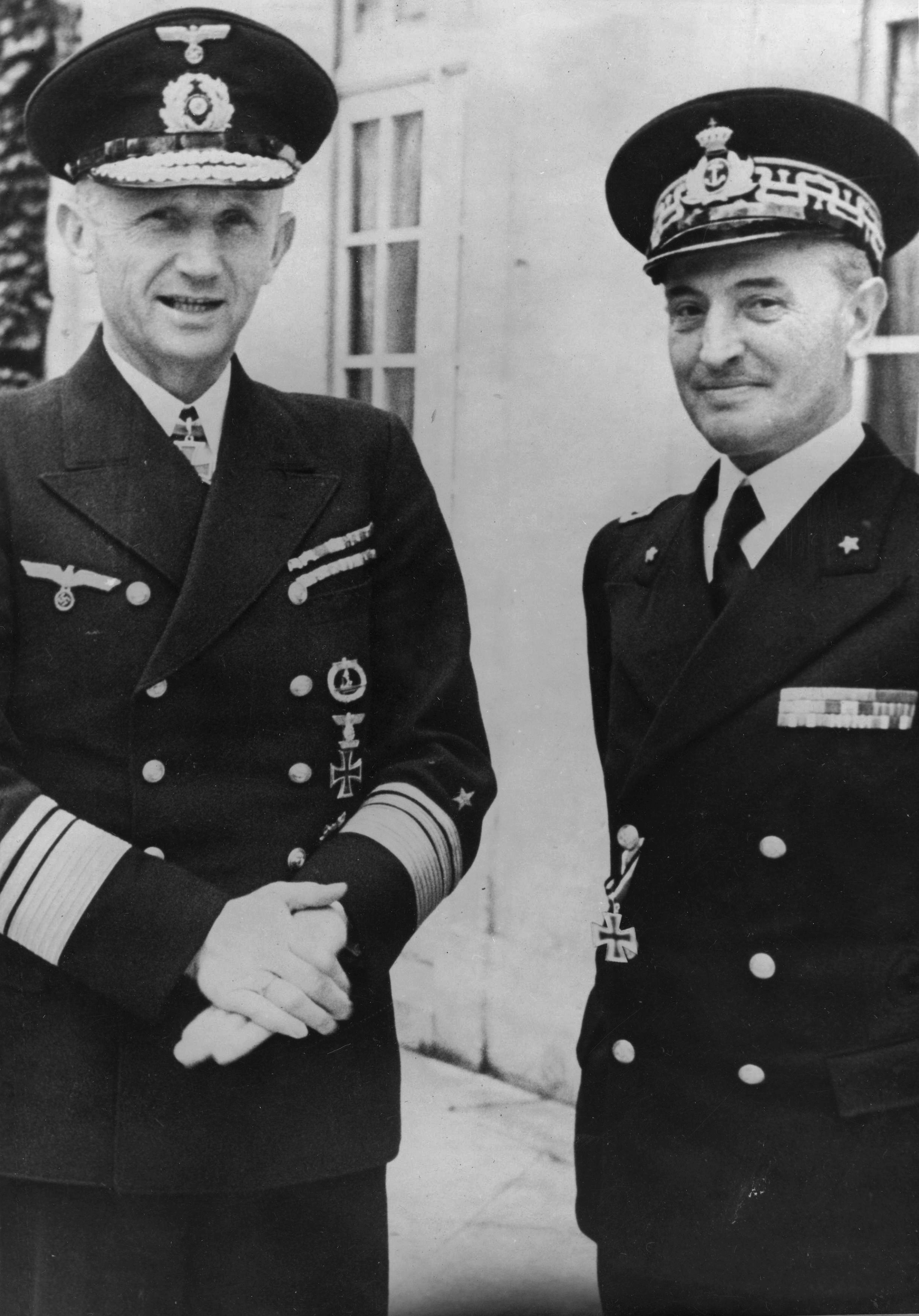
Dönitz and his Italian counterpart Admiral Angelo Parona in 1941

Intelligence played an important role in the Battle of the Atlantic. In general, BdU intelligence was poor. Counter-intelligence was not much better. At the height of the battle in mid-1943, some 2,000 signals were sent from the 110 U-boats at sea. Radio traffic compromised his cyphers by giving the Allies more messages to work with. Furthermore, replies from the boats enabled the Allies to use High-frequency direction finding (HF/DF, called "Huff-Duff") to locate a U-boat using its radio, track it and attack it. The over-centralised command structure of BdU and its insistence on micro-managing every aspect of U-boat operations with endless signals provided the Allied navies with ample intelligence. The enormous "paper chase" [cross-referencing of materials] operations pursued by Allied intelligence agencies were not thought possible by BdU. The Germans did not suspect the Allies had identified the codes broken by B-Dienst. Conversely, when Dönitz suspected the enemy had penetrated his own communications, BdU's response was to suspect internal sabotage and reduce the number of staff officers to the most reliable, exacerbating the problem of over-centralisation. In contrast to the Allies, the Wehrmacht was suspicious of civilian scientific advisors and generally distrusted outsiders. The Germans were never as open to new ideas or thinking of war in intelligence terms. According to one analyst, BdU "lacked imagination and intellectual daring" in the naval war. These Allied advantages failed to avert heavy losses in the June 1940 to May 1941 period, known to U-boat crews as the "First Happy Time". In June 1941, 68 ships were sunk in the North Atlantic (318,740 GRT) at a cost of four U-boats, but the German submarines would not eclipse that number for the remainder of the year. Just 10 transports were sunk in November and December 1941.

On 7 May 1941, the Royal Navy captured the German Arctic meteorological vessel München and took its Enigma machine intact, which allowed the Royal Navy to decode U-boat radio communications in June 1941. Two days later the capture of U-110 was an intelligence coup for the British. The settings for high-level "officer-only" signals, "short-signals" (Kurzsignale) and codes standardising messages to defeat HF/DF fixes by sheer speed were found. Only the Hydra settings for May were missing. The papers were the only stores destroyed by the crew. The capture on 28 June of another weather ship, Lauenburg, enabled British decryption operations to read radio traffic in July 1941. Beginning in August 1941, Bletchley Park operatives could decrypt signals between Dönitz and his U-boats at sea without any restriction. The capture of the U-110 allowed the Admiralty to identify individual boats, their commanders, operational readiness, damage reports, location, type, speed, and endurance from working up in the Baltic to Atlantic patrols. On 1 February 1942, the Germans had introduced the M4 cypher machine, which secured communications until it was cracked in December 1942. Even so, the U-boats achieved their best success against the convoys in March 1943, due to an increase in U-boat numbers, and the protection of the shipping lanes was in jeopardy. Due to the cracked M4 and the use of radar, the Allies began to send air and surface reinforcements to convoys under threat. The shipping lanes were secured, which came as a great surprise to Dönitz. The lack of intelligence and increased numbers of U-boats contributed enormously to Allied losses that year.

Signals security aroused Dönitz's suspicions during the war. On 12 January 1942, German supply submarine U-459 arrived 800 nautical miles west of Freetown, well clear of convoy lanes. It was scheduled to rendezvous with an Italian submarine, but was intercepted by a warship. The German captain's report coincided with reports of a decrease in sightings and a period of tension between Dönitz and Raeder. The number of U-boats in the Atlantic, by logic, should have increased, not lowered the number of sightings and the reasons for this made Dönitz uneasy. Despite several investigations, the conclusion of the BdU staff was that Enigma was impenetrable. His signals officer responded to the U-459 incident with answers ranging from coincidence, direction finding, to Italian treachery. General Erich Fellgiebel, Chief Signal Officer of Army High Command and of Supreme Command of Armed Forces (Chef des Heeresnachrichtenwesens), apparently concurred with Dönitz. He concluded that there was "convincing evidence" that, after an "exhaustive investigation", the Allied codebreakers had been reading high level communications. Other departments in the Navy downplayed or dismissed these concerns. They vaguely implied "some components" of Enigma had been compromised, but there was "no real basis for acute anxiety as regards any compromise of operational security".

=== American entry ===
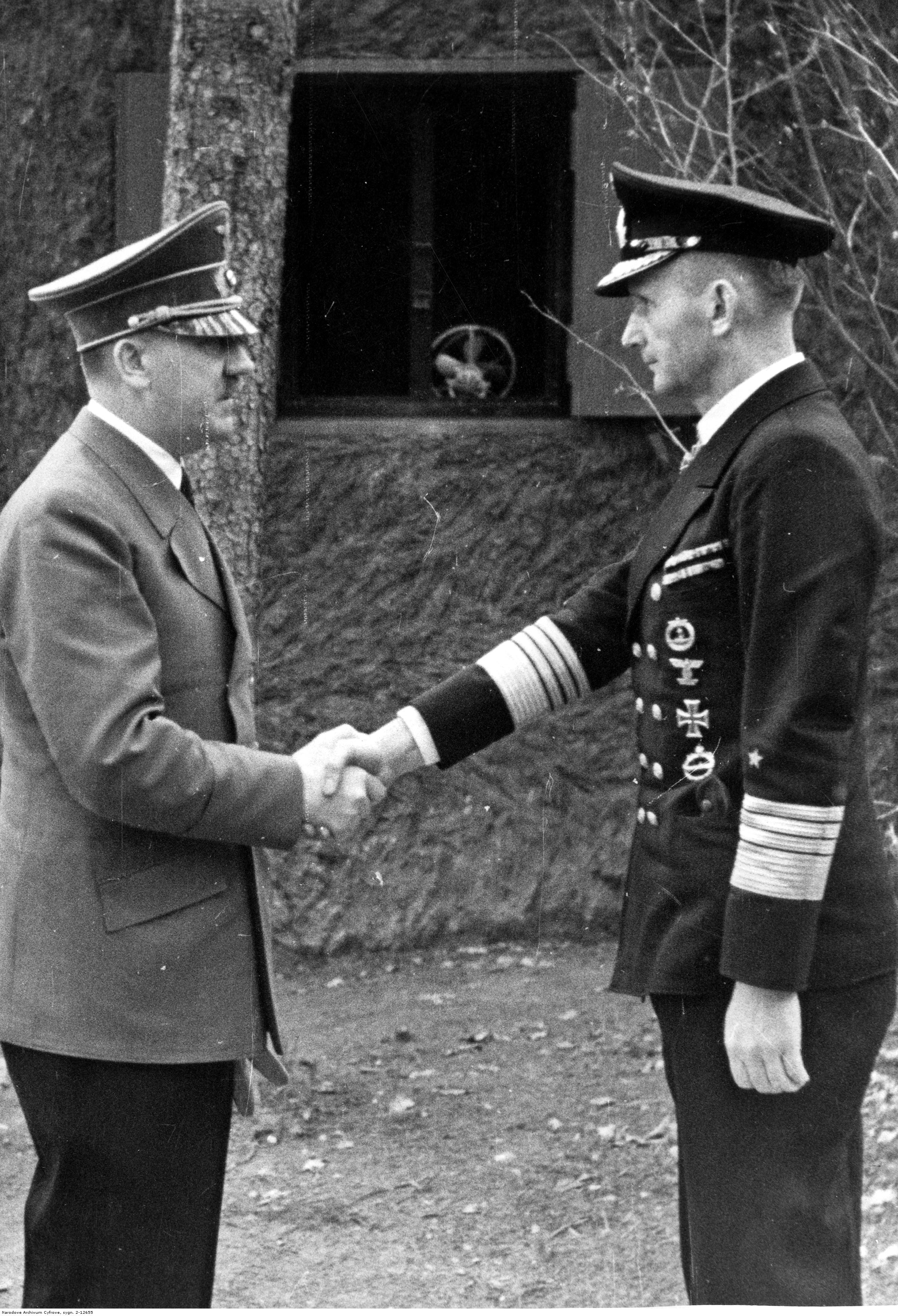
Admiral Karl Doenitz (right) in conversation with the leader of the Third Reich, Adolf Hitler, May 1942

Following Germany's declaration of war on the United States on 11 December 1941, Dönitz implemented Operation Drumbeat (Unternehmen Paukenschlag). The entry of the United States benefited German submarines in the short term. Dönitz intended to strike close to shore in American and Canadian waters and prevent the convoys — the most effective anti–U-boat system — from ever forming. Dönitz was determined to take advantage of Canadian and American unpreparedness before the situation changed.

The problem inhibiting Dönitz's plan was a lack of boats. On paper, he had 259, but in January 1942, 99 were still undergoing sea trials and 59 were assigned to training flotillas, leaving only 101 on war operations. 35 of these were under repair in port, leaving 66 operational, of which 18 were low on fuel and returning to base, 23 were en route to areas where fuel and torpedoes needed to be conserved, and one was heading to the Mediterranean. Therefore, on 1 January, Dönitz had a fighting strength of 16–25 in the Atlantic (six of them close to Iceland on "Norwegian operations"), three in the Arctic Ocean, three in the Mediterranean and three operating west of Gibraltar. Dönitz was severely limited to what he could accomplish in American waters in an initial offensive.

From 13 January 1942, Dönitz planned to begin a surprise offensive from the Gulf of St. Lawrence to Cape Hatteras. Unknown to him, Ultra had read his Enigma signals and knew the position, size, and intentions of his boats, down to the date the operation was scheduled to begin. The attacks, when they came, were not a surprise. Of the 12 U-boats that began the offensive from the Grand Banks southward, just two survived the war. The operation began the Battle of the St. Lawrence, a series of battles which lasted into 1944. It remained possible for a U-boat to operate in the Gulf into 1944, but countermeasures were strong. In 1942, the global ratio of ships-to-U-boats sunk in Canadian waters was 112:1. The global average was 10.3:1. The solitary kill was achieved by the RCAF. Canadian operations, as with American efforts, were a failure during this year.

Along with conventional U-boat operations, Dönitz authorised clandestine activities in Canadian waters, including spying, mine-laying, and recovery of German prisoners of war (as Dönitz wished to extract information from rescued submariners concerning Allied tactics). All of these things tied down Canadian military power and imposed industrial, fiscal, and psychological costs. The impunity with which U-boats carried out these operations in Canadian waters into 1944 provided a propaganda effect. One of these operations was the well-known Operation Kiebitz to rescue Otto Kretschmer.

Even with operational problems, great success was achieved in American waters. From January to July 1942, Dönitz's submarines were able to attack unescorted ships off the United States' east coast and in the Caribbean Sea; U-boats sank more ships and tonnage than at any other time in the war. After a convoy system was introduced to protect shipping, Dönitz shifted his U-boats back to the North Atlantic. The period, known in the U-boat Arm as the "Second Happy Time", represented one of the greatest naval disasters of all time, and the largest defeat suffered by American sea power. The success was achieved with only five U-boats initially which sank 397 ships in waters protected by the United States Navy with an additional 23 sunk at the Panama Sea Frontier. Dönitz put the successes down to the American failure to initialise a blackout along the East Coast of the United States and ship captains' insistence on following peace-time safety procedures. The failure to implement a blackout stemmed from the American government's concern that it would affect the tourism trade. Dönitz wrote in his memoirs that the lighthouses and buoys "shone forth, though perhaps a little less brightly than usually".

By the time improved American air and naval defences had driven German submarines from American shores, 5,000 Allied sailors had been killed for negligible losses in U-boats. Dönitz ordered simultaneous operations in the Caribbean Sea. The ensuing Battle of the Caribbean resulted in immediate dividends for U-boats. In a short time, at least 100 transports had been destroyed or sunk. The sinkings damaged inter-island trade substantially. Operation Neuland was among the most damaging naval campaigns in the region. Oil refinery production in the region declined while the tanker fleet suffered losses of up to ten per cent within twenty-four hours. However, ultimately Dönitz could not hope to sink more ships than American industry could build, so he targeted the tanker fleet in the Caribbean and Gulf of Mexico in the hope that depleting oil transports would paralyse shipyard output. 33 transports were sunk in July before Dönitz lost his first crew. The USN introduced effective convoy systems thereafter, ending the "carnage".

Dönitz maintained his demands for the concentration of all his crews in the Atlantic. As the military situation in North Africa and on the Eastern Front began to deteriorate Hitler diverted a number of submarines to the Battle of the Mediterranean upon the suggestions of Admiral Eberhard Weichold. Raeder and Dönitz resisted the deployment to the Mediterranean to no avail. Hitler felt compelled to act against Allied sea forces, which were having an enormous impact on Axis supply lines to North Africa. The decision defied logic, for a victory in the Atlantic would end the war in the Mediterranean. The U-boat war in the Mediterranean was a costly failure, despite successes against warships. Approximately 60 crews were lost and only one crew managed to withdraw through the Strait of Gibraltar. Albrecht Brandi was one of Dönitz's highest performers but his record is a matter of controversy; post-war records prove systematic over-claiming of sinkings. He survived his boat's sinking and was smuggled to Germany through Spain. Dönitz had met his end as a submarine commander in the Mediterranean two decades earlier.

In 1942, Dönitz summed up his philosophy in one simple paragraph: "The enemy's shipping constitutes one single, great entity. It is therefore immaterial where a ship is sunk. Once it has been destroyed, it has to be replaced by a new ship, and that's that." The remark was the green light to unrestricted submarine warfare and began the tonnage war proper. BdU intelligence concluded the Americans could produce 15,300,000 tons of shipping in 1942 and 1943 — two million tons under actual production figures. Dönitz always calculated the worst-case scenario using the highest figures of enemy production potential. Some 700,000 tons per month needed to be sunk to win the war. The "second happy time" reached a peak in June 1942, with 325,000 tons sunk, up from 311,000 in May, 255,000 in April and the highest since the 327,000 tons sunk in March 1942. With support from the Royal Navy and Royal Canadian Navy, the new convoy systems compelled Dönitz to withdraw his captains to the mid-Atlantic once again. Nevertheless, there was still cause for optimism. B-Dienst had cracked the convoy cyphers and by July 1942, Dönitz could call upon 311 boats, 140 operational, to conduct a renewed assault. By October 1942, he had 196 operational from 365. Dönitz's force finally reached the desired number both he and Raeder had hoped for in 1939. Unaware of it, Dönitz and his men were aided by the Ultra blackout. The addition of a fourth rotor to the Enigma left radio detection the only way to gather intelligence on the dispositions and intentions of the German naval forces. German code breakers had their own success in the capture of the code book to Cypher Code Number 3 from a merchant ship. It was a treble success for the BdU.

Dönitz was content that he now had the naval power to extend U-boat operations to other areas aside from the North Atlantic. The Caribbean, Brazilian waters with the coast of West Africa designated operational theatres. Waters in the southern hemisphere to South Africa could also be attacked with the new Type IX submarine. The strategy was sound and his tactical ideas were effective. The number of boats available allowed him to form Wolfpacks to comb convoy routes from east to west, attacking one when found and pursuing it across the ocean. The pack then refuelled from a U-boat tanker and worked from west to east. Raeder and the operations staff disputed the value in attacking convoys heading westward with empty cargo holds. The tactics were successful but placed great strain on crews who spent up to eight days in constant action.

November 1942 was a new high in the Atlantic. 134 ships were sunk for 807,754 tons. 119 were destroyed by submarines, 83 (508,707 tons) in the Atlantic. The same month, Dönitz suffered strategic defeat. His submarines failed to prevent Operation Torch, even with 196 of them operating in the Atlantic. Dönitz considered it a major self-inflicted defeat. Allied morale radically improved after the victories of Torch, the Second Battle of El Alamein and the Battle of Stalingrad; all occurred within days of one another. The U-boat war was the only military success the Germans enjoyed at the end of the year.

=== Commander-in-chief and Grand Admiral ===
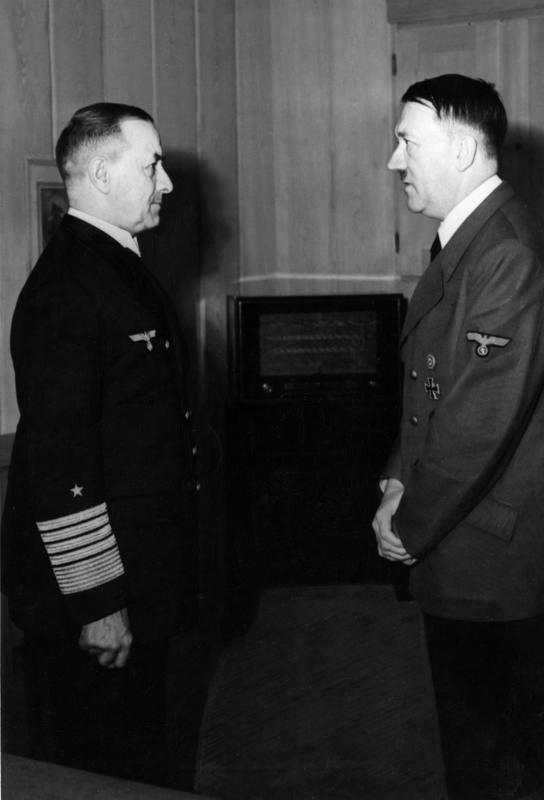
Erich Raeder with Adolf Hitler shortly after he was replaced by Dönitz as Commander-in-chief and Grand Admiral (February 1943)

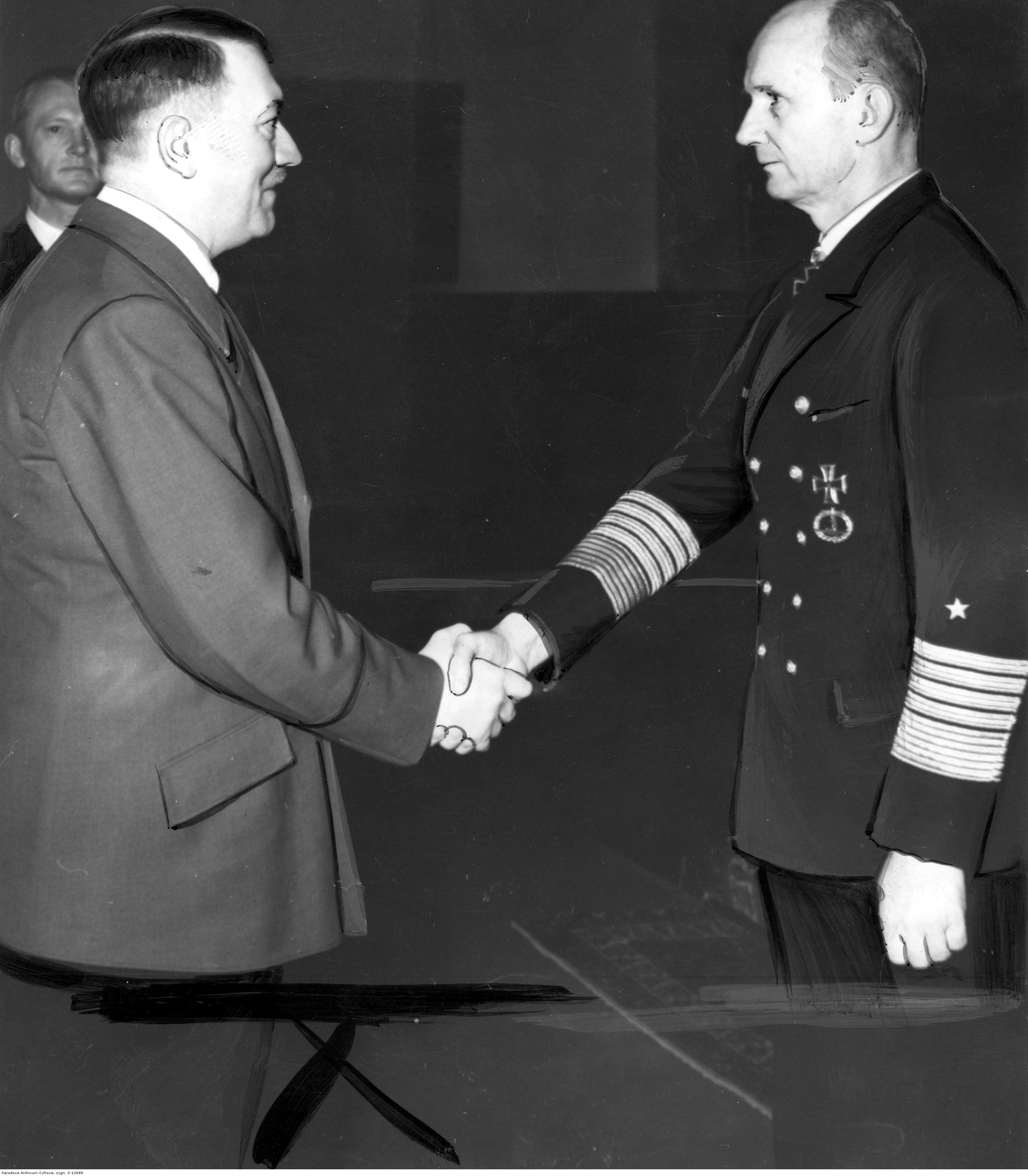
Grand Admiral Karl Doenitz receives the Oak Leaves of the Knight's Cross of the Iron Cross from Third Reich leader Adolf Hitler, April 1943

On 30 January 1943, Dönitz replaced Erich Raeder as Commander-in-chief of the navy (Oberbefehlshaber der Kriegsmarine) and Großadmiral (grand admiral) of the Naval High Command (Oberkommando der Marine). In a communique to the navy he announced his intentions to retain practical control of the U-boats and his desire to fight to the end for Hitler. Dönitz's inability to delegate control of the U-boat service has been construed as a weakness in the U-boat arm, contributing to the perception that Dönitz was an "impatient warrior", preoccupied with fighting battles and tactics rather than a strategist or organiser.

Dönitz's promotion earned Hitler his undying loyalty. For Dönitz, Hitler had given him a "true home-coming at last, to a country in which unemployment appeared to have been abolished, the class war no longer tore the nation apart, and the shame of defeat in 1918 was being expunged." When war came, Dönitz became more firmly wedded to his Nazi faith. Hitler recognised his patriotism, professionalism, but above all, his loyalty. Dönitz remained so long after the war was lost. In so doing, he wilfully ignored the genocidal nature of the regime and claimed ignorance of The Holocaust.

In the last quarter of 1942, 69 submarines had been commissioned, taking the total number to 393, with 212 operational. Dönitz was not satisfied and immediately began a naval construction programme which, in contrast to Raeder's, laid all its emphasis on torpedo boats and submarines. Dönitz's proposed expansion ran into difficulties experienced by all of his predecessors: the lack of steel. The navy had no representation on Albert Speer's armaments ministry, for naval production was the only sphere not under his control. Dönitz understood this worked against the navy because it lacked the elasticity to cope with breakdowns of production at any point, whereas the other services could make good production by compensating one sector at the expense of another. Without any representatives, the battle of priorities was left to Speer and Göring. Dönitz had the sense to place U-boat production under Speer on the condition that 40 per month were completed. Dönitz persuaded Hitler not to scrap the surface fleet capital ships, though they played no role in the Atlantic during his time in command. Dönitz reasoned that the destruction of the surface fleet would provide the British with a victory and heap pressure on the U-boats, for these warships were tying down British air and naval forces that would otherwise be sent into the Atlantic.

New construction procedures, dispensing with prototypes and the abandonment of modifications, reduced construction times from 460,000 man hours to 260–300,000 to meet Speer's quota. In the spring of 1944, the Type XXI submarine was scheduled to reach frontline units. In 1943, the Combined Bomber Offensive undid German plans. Dönitz and Speer were appalled by the destruction of Hamburg, a major construction site. The battles of 1943 and 1944 were fought with the existing Type VII and Type IX submarines. The Type VII remained the backbone of the fleet in 1943.

At the end of 1942, Dönitz was faced with the appearance of escort carriers and long-range aircraft working with convoy escorts. To protect his boats against the latter, he ordered his boats to restrict their operations to the Mid-Atlantic Gap, a stretch of ocean out of the range of land-based aircraft. Allied air forces had few aircraft equipped with ASV radar for U-boat detection into April and May 1943, and such units would not exist in Newfoundland until June. Convoys relied on RAF Coastal Command aircraft operating from Northern Ireland and Iceland. The aircraft imposed restraints on U-boat captains, who feared them for their ability to sink a submarine or alert surface warships to their position. In 1942, Coastal Command began forming units combined with ASV and Leigh Light to attack U-boats at night in transit to the Atlantic via the Bay of Biscay, which continued into 1943. The Command was moderately successful after mid-1942.

1943 began with continued tactical success for Dönitz in battle. In January, Convoy TM 1 was nearly destroyed. The loss of 100,000 tons of fuel in one convoy represented the most devastating loss percentage of the war—only two of nine tankers reached port. The Eighth Army were forced to ration its fuel for a time, earning Dönitz the gratitude of the Afrika Korps. The Casablanca Conference, held that month, identified the Atlantic as the priority. It was agreed that until the defeat of Dönitz and his men, there could be no amphibious landings in continental Europe. Unknown to Dönitz, Bletchley Park had broken the Shark cypher and restored the flow of Enigma information; the Admiralty was able to route convoys around wolfpacks. During January and February 1943 information was decrypted within 24 hours proving operationally useful, although this slipped at the end of the second month contributing to German interceptions. Even so, in appalling weather, the Germans sank only 44 ships during the month, even with 100 U-boats at sea, the majority stationed in the mid-Atlantic gap.

In February 1943, the strength of Allied defences was ominous for Dönitz. The battle of convoy HX 224 ended upon the intervention of air power from Iceland. Dönitz sent 20 boats to attack SC 118 and both sides suffered heavy losses—11 merchant ships for three U-boats, plus four damaged. It was "what both sides considered one of the hardest fought battles of the Atlantic war". Despite sending 20 crews into action, Dönitz was concerned that most captains did not press home attacks. The majority of the ships sunk were by one crew, commanded by Siegfried von Forstner — he sank seven.

In March, Convoy SC 121 was attacked by 31 U-boats in two patrol lines. It was the most successful battle of the war for Dönitz. The battle of Convoys HX 229/SC 122 was the largest convoy battle, with 40 U-boats involved. Each operation was successful, but all were fought in the mid-Atlantic. Allied losses reached a peak in March 1943. The Admiralty later issued a report on the matter: "The Germans never came so near [to] disrupting communications between the new world and the old as in the first twenty days of March 1943." Dönitz later conceded the March battles were to be the U-boats' last victories. New Allied techniques, tactics and technology began to turn the tide. By April 1943, U-boat morale was reaching a crisis point. Ninety-eight new boats were sent into the Atlantic that month and although the training was thorough, the crews were inexperienced and it showed. Fifteen U-boats were destroyed in March 1943 and another 15 in April. Werner Hartenstein and Johann Mohr were notable casualties over the course of these eight weeks; the former's decision to rescue survivors of a sunken ship led to Dönitz's Laconia Order, which later formed part of the criminal case against Dönitz.

Ominous for BdU was the sudden growth of Allied air power. The Allied command accepted that air cover over the mid-Atlantic was inadequate and had drawn attention to the fact that not one VLR (Very Long Range) aircraft was to be found at any Allied air base west of Iceland. The Americans released 255 Liberators for the North Atlantic. At the end of March 1943, 20 VLR aircraft were operational, rising to 41 by mid-April, all of them flown by British crews. Twenty-eight anti-submarine and 11 anti-shipping squadrons were available to RAF Coastal Command, 619 aircraft in all — a striking change since September 1939. The influx of radar equipped aircraft into the mid-Atlantic was matched by air patrols over the Bay of Biscay. Dönitz detected a drop in morale among his captains, as did the British. Dönitz encouraged his commanders to show a "hunter's instinct" and "warrior spirit" in the face of the air–surface support group threat.

Along with air power, the BdU was forced to contend with a large increase in Allied convoy escorts, which fuelled from tankers in the convoys, allowing escorts across the ocean. The escort carrier support groups, protected by destroyers, which, in the words of the official naval historian of the Second World War, proved decisive; "it was the advent of the Support Groups, the Escort Carriers and the Very Long Range Aircraft which turned the tables on the U-boats-and did so with astonishing rapidity".

One hundred eight ships were sunk in the first 20 days of March, and just 15 in the last 10. The official naval historian wrote, "The collapse of the enemy's offensive, when it came, was so sudden that it took him completely by surprise. We now know that, in fact, a downward trend in the U-boats' recent accomplishments could have forewarned him, but was concealed from him by the exaggerated claims made by their commanders." In April, Dönitz lost five crews to the Coastal Command ASV Biscay offensive. Encouraged by the isolated successes of anti-aircraft artillery installed on submarines, he ordered crews to stay on the surface and fight it out with the aircraft. The decision caused casualties — four boats were lost in the first week of May alone, and three more by the end.

For the month of April, Allied losses fell to 56 ships of 327,943 tons. In May 1943, the battle reached a climax with the battles of Convoy ONS 5, Convoy SC 129, Convoy SC 130. Throughout the battles, only two ships were sunk in convoy in the Atlantic while an air anti-submarine escort was present. Dönitz depended on the surface manoeuvrability of his U-boats to locate targets, assemble wolfpacks and the complicated business of positioning his forces ahead of a convoy for an attack. Allied air power determined where and when U-boats could move freely on the surface. It was the combination of convoy escorts and air power that made the Atlantic unsuitable for pack operations. The US Navy introduced the K-class blimp. They forced a commander to dive to prevent the aircraft from marking his position or attacking. From 10 to 24 May 1943, ten convoys passed through the mid-Atlantic. Six of the 370 ships were sunk; three were stragglers. Thirteen U-boats were sunk; four by warships, seven by aircraft, and two shared.

By 24 May, when Dönitz conceded defeat and withdrew the surviving crews from the field of battle, they had already lost 33 U-boats. At the end of May, it had risen to 41. Dönitz tried to limit the damage to morale by declaring that the withdrawal was only temporary "to avoid unnecessary losses in a period when our weapons are shown to be at a disadvantage" and that "the battle in the north Atlantic — the decisive area — will be resumed". Dönitz did make a further attempt to regain the initiative, but the battle never reached the same pitch of intensity or hung in the balance as during the spring of 1943. The Allied success won the Battle of the Atlantic. On 24 May, Dönitz ordered the suspension of Atlantic operations, bringing an end to Black May.

Defeat in the mid-Atlantic left Dönitz in a dilemma. The U-boats had proven unable to elude convoy escorts and attack convoys with success. He was concerned about crew morale suffering from idleness and a loss of experience with the latest Allied developments in anti-submarine warfare. Aside from problems of seaworthiness among machines and crew, there were not enough Submarine pens to store idle boats and they were a target for aircraft in port. Dönitz would not withdraw his submarines from combat operations, for he felt the ships, men and aircraft engaged in suppressing the U-boats could then be turned on Germany directly; the U-boat war was to continue.

=== Hunter-killer era ===
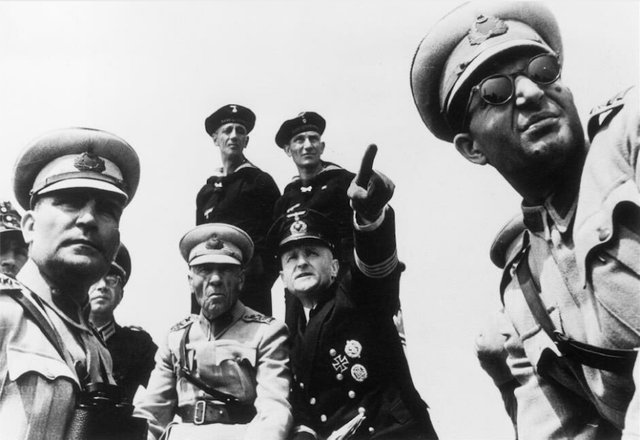
Karl Dönitz and Cemil Cahit Toydemir during a visit to the Eastern Front, July 1943

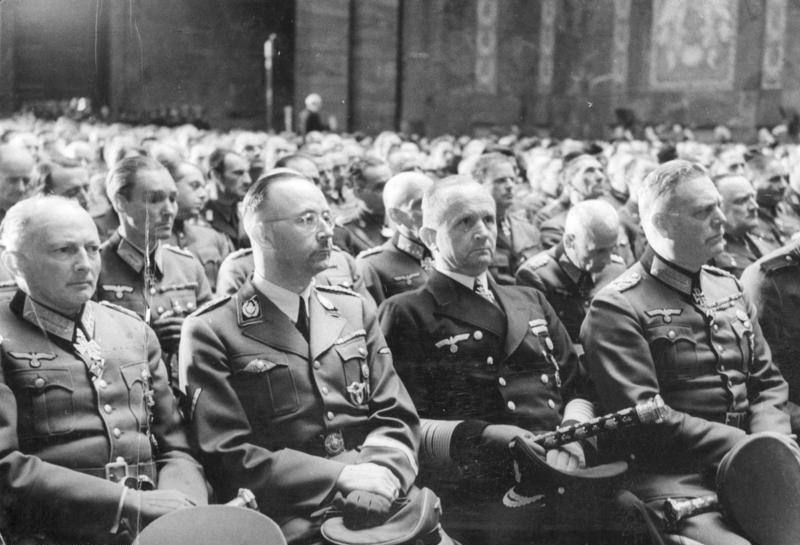
From left to right: Kluge, Himmler, Dönitz (with his grand admiral's baton) and Keitel at Hans Hube's funeral, 1944

From mid-June 1943, the technological and industrial superiority of the Allied navies allowed the Americans, Canadians, and British to form hunter-killer groups consisting of fast anti-submarine escorts and aircraft carriers. The purpose of naval operations changed from avoiding U-boats and safeguarding convoys to seeking them out and destroying them wherever they operated. USN hunter-killer groups operated throughout the Atlantic. Argentia had been an important base for the naval task forces until superseded by the Royal Canadian Navy in early 1943. U-boat operations were "crushed" by these task forces: 14 were sunk and only two of seven crews operating in Brazilian waters returned to Germany.

Dönitz reacted by deploying his U-boats near the Azores where land-based aircraft still had difficulty reaching them. In this region, he hoped to threaten the Gibraltar–Britain convoy route. Dönitz intended to concentrate his power in a rough arc from West Africa to South America and the Caribbean. He hoped to maintain a presence in the western and central Atlantic, reduce losses and await new weapons and anti-detection devices. In this, he failed to "stem the tide of U-boat losses." A large portion of the 39 U-boats deployed on these operations were intercepted. From May 1943, one historian wrote: "U-boats rash enough to close with an Atlantic convoy [...] were simply inviting destruction."

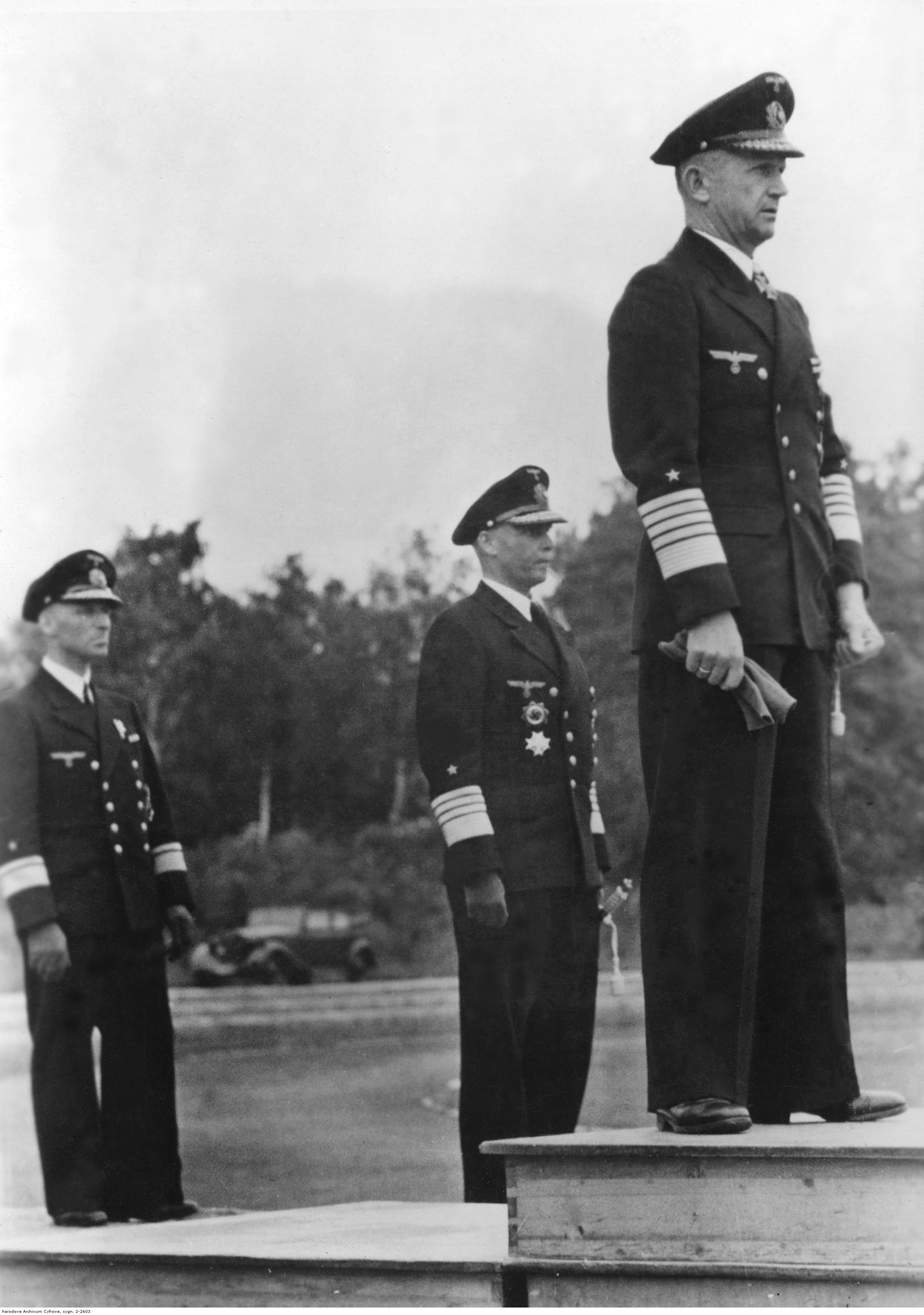
Dönitz speech marines. February 1944

Dönitz's crews faced danger from the outset. The transit routes through the Bay of Biscay were heavily patrolled by aircraft. From May to December 1943, 25 U-boats were sunk by Coastal Command, more were sunk by the USAAF and Royal Navy — five and four, respectively — with one shared by the navy and Coastal Command. To counter radar aircraft, Dönitz ordered his submarines to group together and merge their powerful anti-aircraft armament together while surfaced and recharging their batteries, after initially ordering the groups to remain surfaced throughout the journey and fight off aerial attackers with gunfire. The decision was to cost BdU heavy casualties. A group of U-boats were more likely to attract a radar contact, and Allied pilots soon learned to swarm their targets. Dönitz ordered his captains to traverse the Bay under the lee of the neutral Spanish coast, with a sharply rising coast which shielded U-boats from radar. After 4 August 1943, the number of destroyed U-boats fell from one every four days to one every 27 days until June 1944.

US hunter–killer groups extended their patrols to the central Atlantic in the summer. They sank 15 U-boats from June through to August 1943. A number of supply submarines were destroyed, crippling the Germans' ability to conduct long range operations. At the end of the summer, practically all supply U-boats had been destroyed. In September 1943, Dönitz ordered his submarines back to the North Atlantic. U-boats were equipped with the G7es torpedo, an acoustic torpedo, which the grand admiral hoped would wrest the technological initiative back. The torpedo was the centrepiece of Dönitz's plan. Great faith was also placed in the installation of Wanze radar to detect aircraft. It was intended as a successor to the Metox radar detector. A number of his boats were later retrofitted with the submarine snorkel, permitting the submarine to stay submerged. Dönitz placed much faith in the Type XXI submarine. He accepted that the older submarines were obsolete now that Allied defences in the air were complete. He required a "true submarine", equipped with a snorkel to allow his crews to stay submerged, at least to snorkel depth, and evade radar-equipped aircraft. Dönitz was pleased with the promised top speed of 18 knots.

That month, 21 boats fought a battle with two formations; Convoys ONS 18/ON 202. The battle was a failure. In October, an attack on Convoy SC 143 failed, even with limited air support from the Luftwaffe. The battle with Convoys ONS 20/ON 206 in the same month was a comprehensive defeat. A fourth major battle, Convoy SL 138/MKS 28, developed in the last days of October and ended in another failure for Dönitz. The November battle around Convoy SL 139/MKS 30 ended in the repulse of 29 U-boats with the loss of only a single ship. Intelligence proved its worth. During the battles of convoys ONS 18/ON 202, Dönitz's admonitions to his commanders allowed the Allied intelligence services to uncover German tactical intentions. Dönitz had tried and failed to push his forces through lethal convoy defences. The hunter-killer groups were called in to hunt the remaining members of the wolfpacks, with predictable results. In mid-December 1943, Dönitz finally conceded not only the Atlantic, but the Gibraltar routes as well.

The hunter-killer and convoy escorts brought the wolfpack era to an end at the close of 1943. Dönitz resorted to sending out single submarines to the far reaches of the oceans in a bid to escape Allied naval power. In November 1943, he sent the last U-boat into the Gulf of Mexico just after the blackout restrictions were lifted. U-193 achieved one final success. The end of 1943 ended the attempt of the U-boat arm to achieve a strategic victory in the Atlantic. That left only the Arctic convoys to the Soviet Union. On Christmas Eve, this became the sole preserve of the U-boats after the dispatch of Scharnhorst at the Battle of the North Cape.

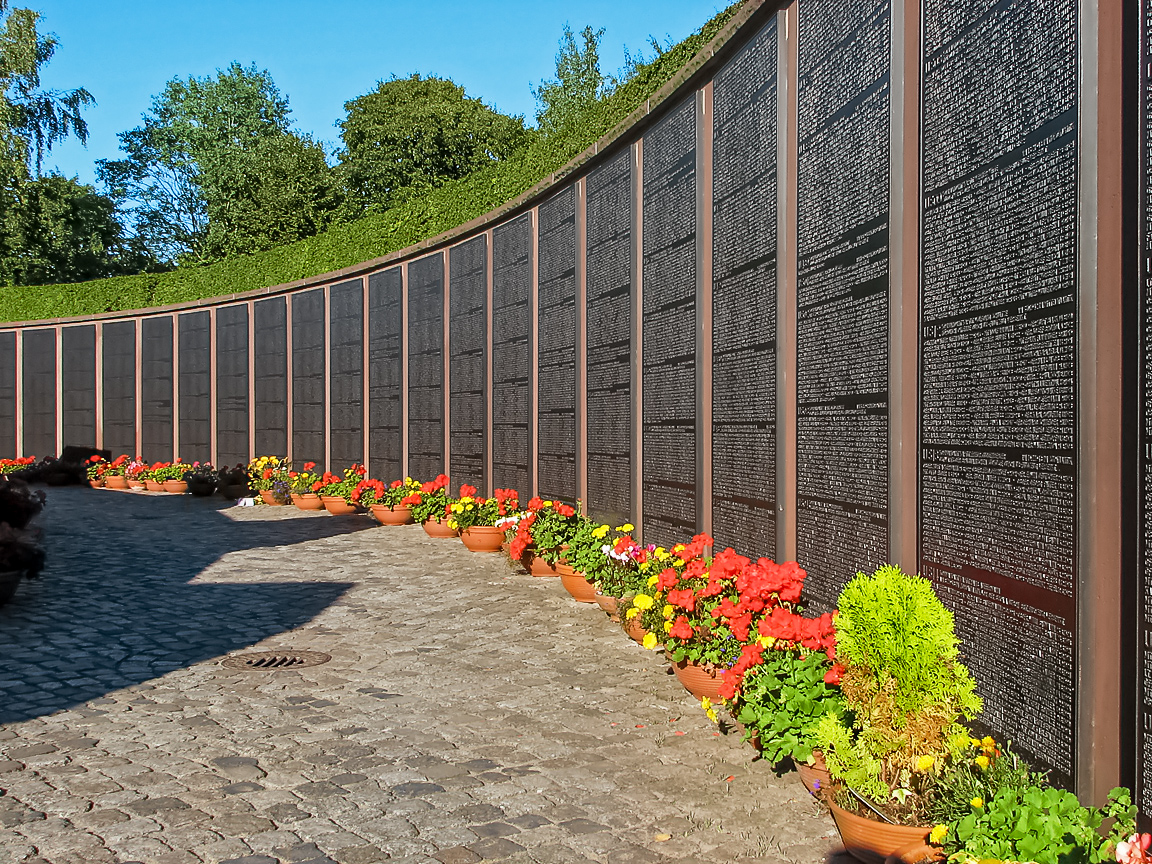
Möltenort U-Boat Memorial near Kiel in northern Germany. Approximately 30,000 men died under Dönitz's command.

Dönitz's plan for 1944 was simply to survive and await the XXI and Type XXIII submarines. New radars were on the horizon and a direction finding antenna for Naxos was scheduled for use. Dönitz established a naval operations scientific staff to focus on more powerful centimetric radars. Production of submarines was streamlined. Parts for eight major sections were fabricated across 60 plants in Europe and assembled at Hamburg, Danzig and Bremen to ease the pressure of bombing and congestion at shipyards. The first of the new generation boats was expected by April 1944. Dönitz hoped for 33 per month by September. In early 1944, Dönitz opted to concentrate west of Ireland, at 15 and 17° west, in the hope convoys would come to them. Single boats were still sent to the Mediterranean and the Indian Ocean. With 66 vessels at sea at any one time, and with 200 boats operational, the BdU was still a viable threat and he believed the force could achieve modest success. The U-boats were painfully slow, strategically, operationally and tactically. Crossing the Atlantic took up to a month compared to a week in 1942. Positioning west of Ireland could take several weeks to be submerged. In the first quarter of 1944, U-boats sank only three of the 3,360 ships that passed south of Ireland. In return, 29 crews were lost. A major concern to Dönitz was Operation Overlord, the long predicted landing in France, and what role the U-boat arm and surface forces could play in the defence. He was sensitive to a landing on the Bay of Biscay but retained boats there only for operational readiness. Dönitz ended reconnaissance operations in the region. In the BdU war diary, he wrote of ending operations since "otherwise the strong enemy air activity will lead to high losses which would only be acceptable if an immediate landing on the Biscay coast were expected. As this is no longer considered an acute danger, the boats will remain at readiness in the concrete shelters."

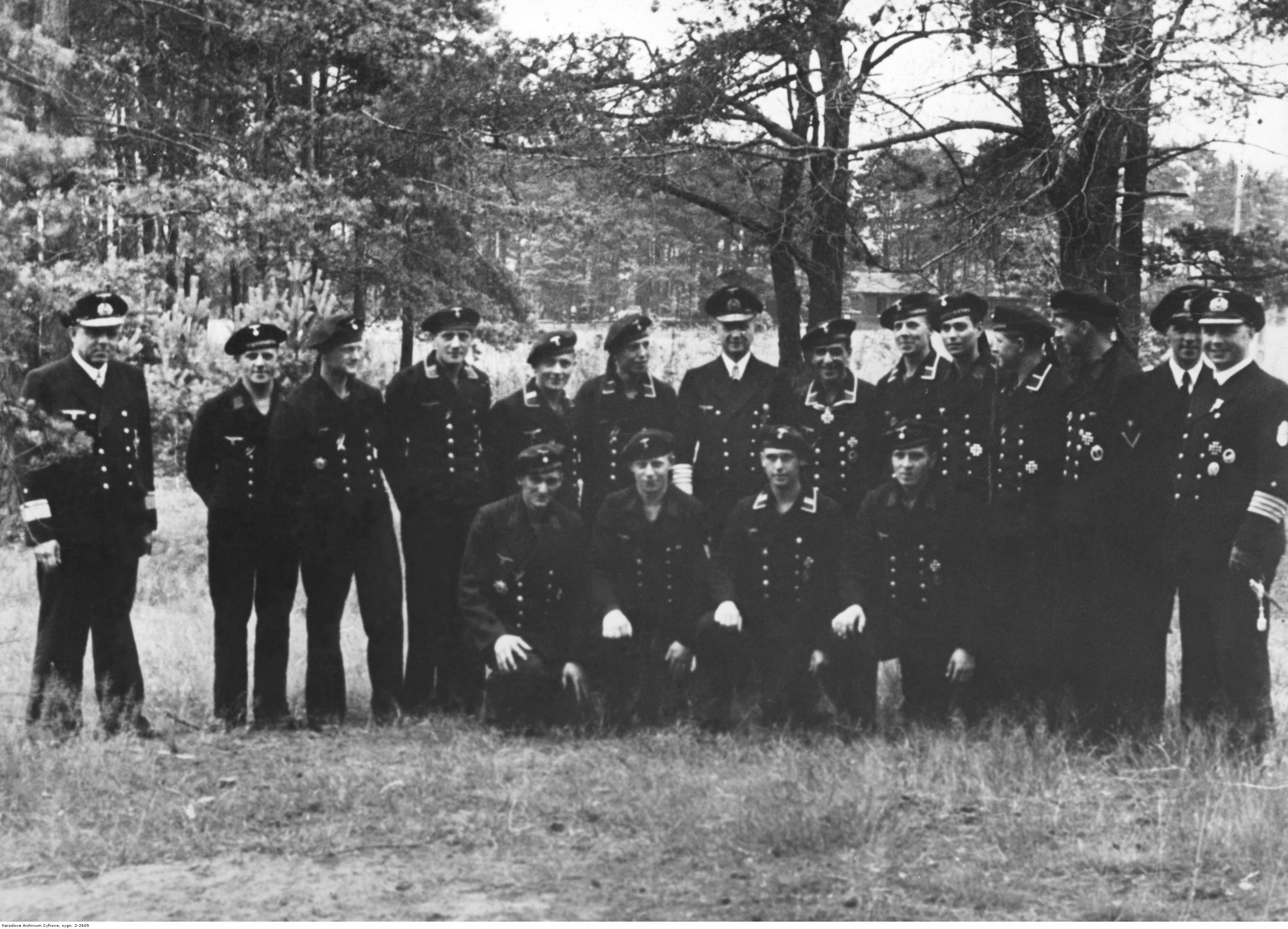
Karl Dönitz with students in July 1944

When the D-day landings took place on 6 June 1944, the U-boats were ordered into action with the awareness that the western flank of the invasion would be well protected at sea. Operational experience with the snorkel was too scant to devise instructions for its use. The narrow, shallow waters of the English Channel provided few opportunities for charging the batteries. Dönitz feared the task was impossible. The Holzbein group based at Brest sent 15 submarines into action against the Cherbourg peninsula landings, part of a 36-strong flotilla. Only eight had snorkels. The seven non-snorkel boats were ordered to attack on the surface. The BdU war diary entry on 6 June 1944 states that "for those boats without schnorchel this means the last operation". Of the 15, only five got near to the invasion fleet. Five of the snorkel boats survived. In exchange for 10 U-boats with the survivors damaged, two frigates, four freighters, and one tank landing ship were sunk. 22 U-boats were sunk from 6 to 30 June 1944. On 5 July 1944, the Allied Operation Dredger permitted hunter-killer groups to roam the Western Approaches and Biscay, making it a "no-go area" for U-boats. U-boat operations against Normandy landings were a fiasco. Dönitz and the high command had been ignorant of the true scale of the naval D-day effort. Dönitz claimed his men sank five escorts, 12 merchant ships and four landing craft for 20 submarines and 1,000 men, of whom 238 were rescued. Dönitz's claims underplayed German losses, which were, in fact, 41 submarines from 82 in France, a 50% loss rate.

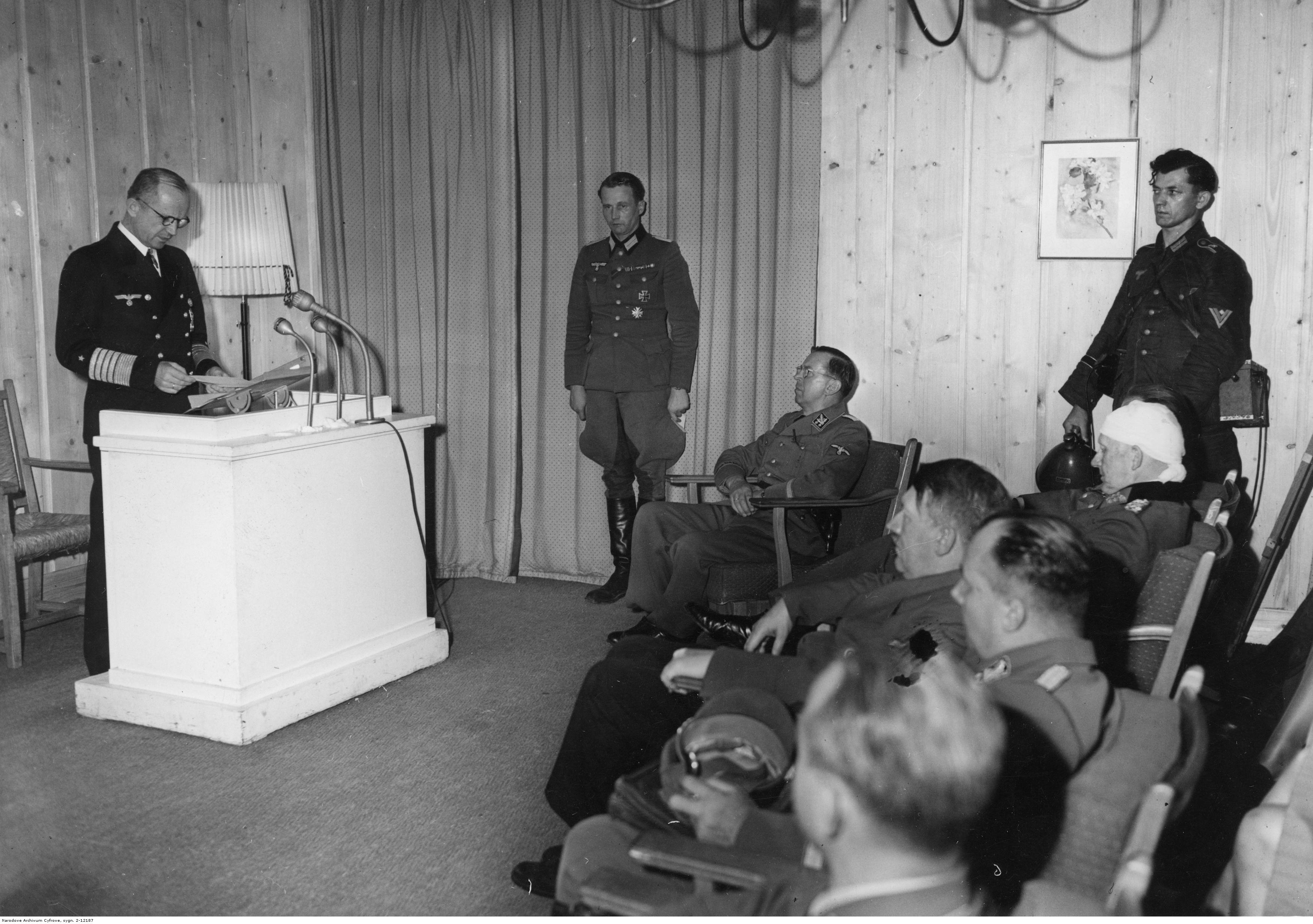
Admiral Karl Dönitz giving a radio speech after the attempt on Adolf Hitler's life, 21 July 1944

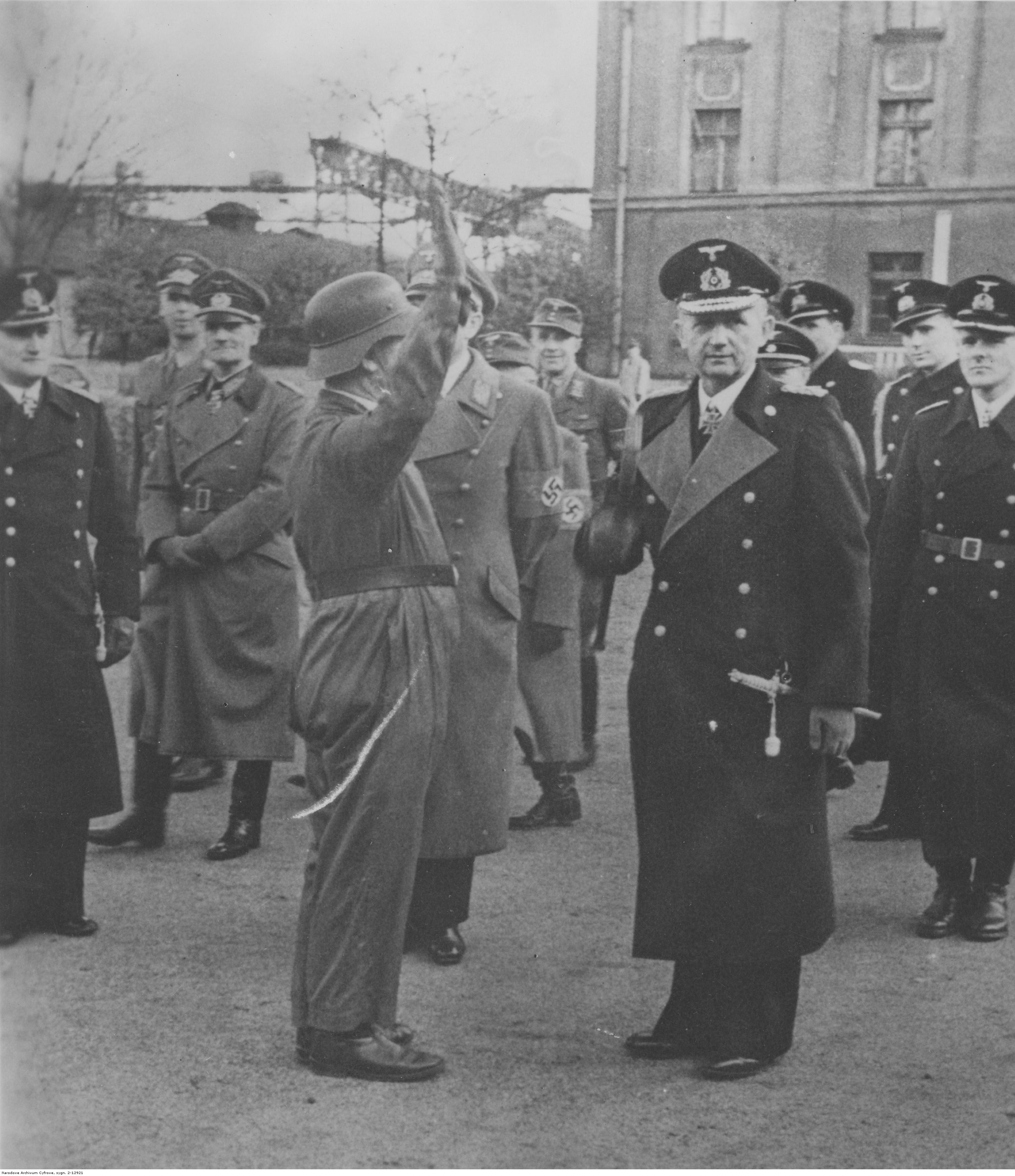
Karl Dönitz among workers at the shipyard, December 1944

The collapse of the German front in Normandy left only the bases in German-occupied Norway nearest to the Atlantic. The newer boats were not forthcoming either. Ninety Type XXI and 31 Type XIII boats were built by the end of 1944. Sixty of the former and 23 of the latter were in service, but none were operational. Dönitz was left with the old VIIs to carry the war into 1945. A large number had snorkels, which enabled them to surface only upon reaching port. Submerged, this meant no radio or Enigma communications and far fewer sightings for the Allied intelligence network to exploit. Dönitz ordered his submarines to British coastal waters with some success in November and December 1944, achieving 85,639 tons. Admiral Andrew Cunningham remarked on the strategy, "We are having a difficult time with the U-boats [...] the air is about 90% out of business and ASDIC is failing us". The inshore waters impeded the use of ASDIC, which became confused with wrecks, rocks, and tidal swirls. The new types could conceivably have capitalised on these developments, but the war was nearly over. On 1 January 1945, Dönitz had 425 submarines; 144 operational. On 1 April 1945, it was 166 from 429. He threw into battle every available weapon as the German Reich collapsed. Dönitz supported the use of Human torpedoes; the Neger, Marder, Seehund and Biber were all used in suicide missions on his orders, perhaps inspired by the Japanese Kamikaze.

On 30 April 1945, Adolf Hitler committed suicide. Dönitz succeeded him as head of state. Admiral Hans-Georg von Friedeburg succeeded Dönitz as commander-in-chief of the Kriegsmarine. On 4 May 1945, the German surrender at Lüneburg Heath took place. Dönitz issued an order to all U-boats to cease combat operations and return to port or surrender to Allied naval vessels. The order was obeyed with a handful of notable exceptions — the actions of 5–6 May 1945 and actions of 7–8 May 1945 occurred after the surrender. The surrendered U-boats numbered in the hundreds and were destroyed in the postwar Operation Deadlight. The U-boat war finally came to an end on 9 May 1945, the date of the German Instrument of Surrender.

=== President of Germany ===
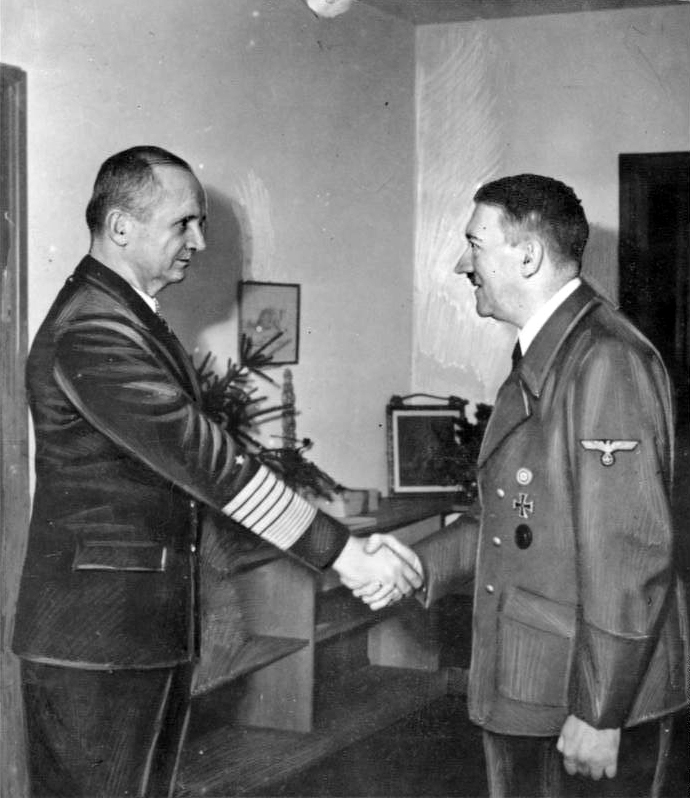
Adolf Hitler (right) meets with Dönitz in Adlerhorst Hessen (1945).

Dönitz admired Hitler and was vocal about the qualities he perceived in Hitler's leadership. In August 1943, he praised his foresightedness and confidence: "Anyone who thinks he can do better than the Führer is stupid." Dönitz's relationship with Hitler strengthened through to the end of the war, particularly after the 20 July plot, for the naval staff officers were not involved; when news of it came, there was indignation in the OKM. Even after the war, Dönitz said he could never have joined the conspirators. Dönitz tried to imbue Nazi ideas among his officers, though the indoctrination of the naval officer corps was not the brainchild of Dönitz, but rather a continuation of the Nazification of the navy begun under his predecessor Raeder. Naval officers were required to attend a five-day education course in Nazi ideology. Dönitz's loyalty to him and the cause was rewarded by Hitler, who, owing to Dönitz's leadership, never felt abandoned by the navy. In gratitude, Hitler appointed the navy's commander as his successor before he committed suicide.

Dönitz's influence on military matters was also evident. Hitler acted on Dönitz's advice in September 1944 to block the Gulf of Finland after Finland abandoned the Axis powers. Operation Tanne Ost was a poorly executed disaster. Dönitz shared Hitler's senseless strategic judgement — with the Courland Pocket on the verge of collapse, and the air and army forces requesting a withdrawal, the two men were preoccupied in planning an attack on an isolated island in the far north. Hitler's willingness to listen to the naval commander was based on his high opinion of the navy's usefulness at this time. It reinforced isolated coastal garrisons along the Baltic and evacuated thousands of German soldiers and civilians in order that they might continue to participate in the war effort into the spring of 1945.

Through 1944 and 1945, the Dönitz-initiated Operation Hannibal had the distinction of being the largest naval evacuation in history. The Baltic Fleet was presented with a mass of targets, and the subsequent Soviet Baltic Sea submarine campaign in 1944 and Soviet Baltic Sea campaign in 1945 inflicted grievous losses during Hannibal. The most notable was the sinking of the MV Wilhelm Gustloff by a Soviet submarine. The liner had nearly 10,000 people on board. The evacuations continued after the surrender. From 3 to 9 May 1945, 81,000 of the 150,000 persons waiting on the Hel Peninsula were evacuated without loss. Albrecht Brandi, commander of the eastern Baltic, initiated a counter operation, the Gulf of Finland campaign, but failed to have an impact.

In the final days of the war, after Hitler had taken refuge in the Führerbunker beneath the Reich Chancellery garden in Berlin, Reichsmarschall Hermann Göring was considered the obvious successor to Hitler, followed by Reichsführer-SS Heinrich Himmler. Göring, however, infuriated Hitler by radioing him in Berlin to ask for permission to assume leadership of the Reich. Himmler also tried to seize power by entering into negotiations with Count Bernadotte. On 28 April 1945, the BBC reported that Himmler had offered surrender to the western Allies and that the offer had been declined.

From mid-April 1945, Dönitz and elements of what remained of the Reich government moved into the buildings of the Stadtheide Barracks in Plön. In his last will and testament, dated 29 April 1945, Hitler named Dönitz his successor as Staatsoberhaupt (Head of state), with the titles of Reichspräsident (President) and Supreme Commander of the Armed Forces. The same document named Propaganda Minister Joseph Goebbels as Head of government with the title of Reichskanzler (Chancellor). Hitler would not name any successors to hold his titles of Führer or leader of the Nazi Party. Furthermore, Hitler declared both Göring and Himmler traitors and expelled them from the party. He committed suicide on 30 April.

On 1 May 1945, the day after Hitler's own suicide, Goebbels committed suicide. Dönitz thus became the sole representative of the collapsing German Reich. On 2 May, the new government of the Reich fled to Flensburg-Mürwik. That night, 2 May, Dönitz made a nationwide radio address in which he announced Hitler's death and said the war would continue in the East "to save Germany from destruction by the advancing Bolshevik enemy." Dönitz remained in Flensburg–Mürwik until his arrest on 23 May 1945.

Dönitz knew that Germany's position was untenable and the Wehrmacht was no longer capable of offering meaningful resistance. During his brief period in office, he devoted most of his effort to ensuring the loyalty of the German armed forces and trying to ensure that German personnel would surrender to the British or Americans and not the Soviets. He feared vengeful Soviet reprisals and hoped to strike a deal with the Western Allies. In the end, Dönitz's tactics were moderately successful, enabling about 1.8 million German soldiers to escape Soviet capture. As many as 2.2 million may have been evacuated.

=== Flensburg Government ===
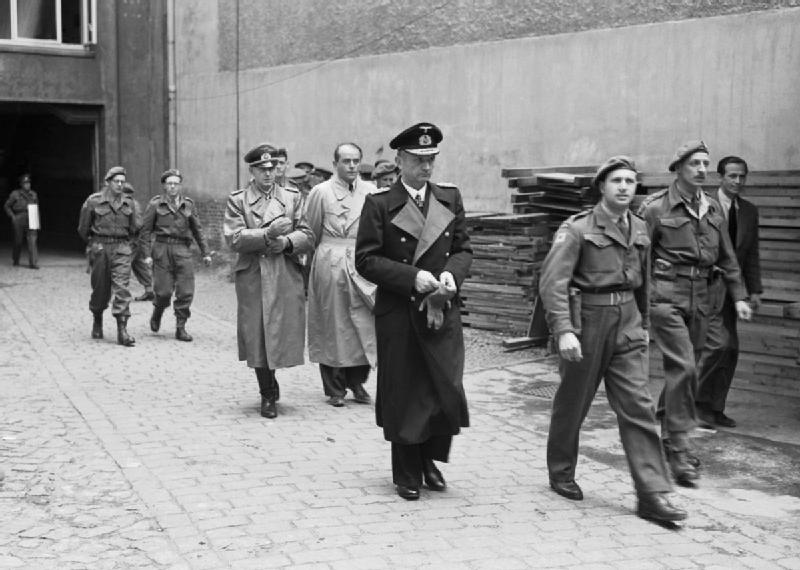
Karl Dönitz (centre, in long, dark coat) followed by Albert Speer (bareheaded) and Alfred Jodl (on Speer's right) during the arrest of the Flensburg Government by British troops

On 4 May, Admiral Hans-Georg von Friedeburg, representing Dönitz, surrendered all German forces in the Netherlands, Denmark, and northwestern Germany to Field Marshal Bernard Montgomery at Lüneburg Heath southeast of Hamburg. A day later, Dönitz sent Friedeburg to US General Dwight D. Eisenhower's headquarters in Reims, France, to negotiate a complete surrender to the Allies.

The Chief of Staff of OKW, Generaloberst (Colonel-General) Alfred Jodl, arrived a day later. Dönitz had instructed them to draw out the negotiations for as long as possible so that German troops and refugees could surrender to the Western powers, but when Eisenhower let it be known he would not tolerate their stalling, Dönitz authorised Jodl to sign the instrument of unconditional surrender at 1:30 on the morning of 7 May. Just over an hour later, Jodl signed the documents. The surrender documents included the phrase, "All forces under German control to cease active operations at 23:01 hours Central European Time on 8 May 1945." At Stalin's insistence, on 8 May, shortly before midnight, (Generalfeldmarschall) Wilhelm Keitel repeated the signing in Berlin at Marshal Georgy Zhukov's headquarters, with General Carl Spaatz of the USAAF present as Eisenhower's representative. At the time specified, World War II in Europe ended.

On 23 May, the Flensburg Government (also known as the "Dönitz government") was dissolved when Dönitz was arrested by an RAF Regiment task force. Generaloberst Jodl, Reichsminister Speer and other members were also handed over to troops of the Herefordshire Regiment at Flensburg.

Dönitz's Großadmiral's ceremonial baton, awarded to him by Hitler, can be seen in the regimental museum of the King's Shropshire Light Infantry in Shrewsbury Castle. His Kriegsmarine flag, which was removed from his headquarters, can be seen at the RAF Regiment Heritage Centre at RAF Honington and his car pennant in the regimental museum of the Herefordshire Light Infantry.

== Nazism and antisemitism ==
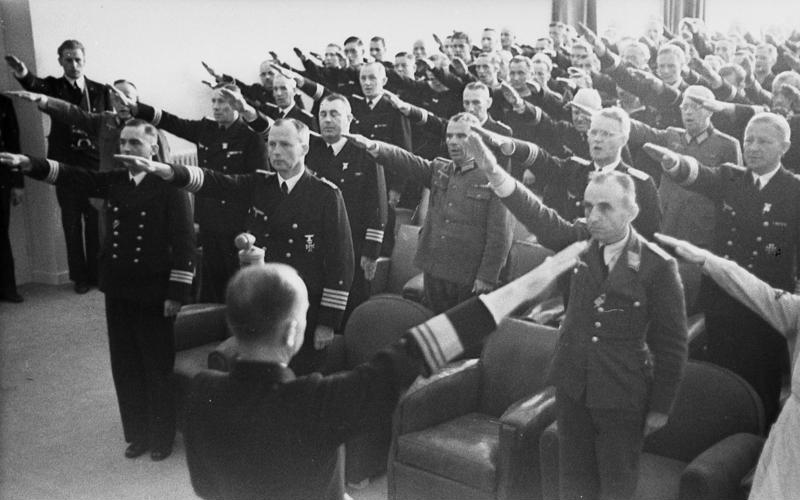
Dönitz and other officers performing the Nazi salute in 1941

Dönitz was a dedicated Nazi and a passionate supporter of Hitler, something he attempted to obscure after the war. Raeder described him as "a picture-book Nazi and confirmed anti-Semite". Several naval officers described him as "closely tied to Hitler and Nazi ideology." On occasion, he spoke of Hitler's humanity. His fervent pro-Hitler attitude led to him being known ironically as "Hitler Youth Quex", after the fictionalised hero of a Nazi novel and feature film. He refused to help Albert Speer stop the scorched earth policy dictated by Hitler and is also noted to have declared, "In comparison to Hitler we are all pipsqueaks. Anyone who believes he can do better than the Führer is stupid."

Dönitz contributed to the spread of Nazism within the Kriegsmarine. He insisted that officers share his political views and, as head of the Kriegsmarine, formally joined the Nazi Party on 1 February 1944, as member 9,664,999. He was awarded the Golden Party Badge for his loyalty to the party later that year. Dönitz's influence over naval officers contributed to none joining the attempts to kill Hitler.

From an ideological standpoint, Dönitz was anti-Marxist and antisemitic and believed that Germany needed to fight the "poison of Jewry". Several antisemitic statements by Dönitz are known. When Sweden closed its international waters to Germany, Dönitz blamed this action on their fear and dependence on "international Jewish capital". In August 1944, he declared, "I would rather eat dirt than see my grandchildren grow up in the filthy, poisonous atmosphere of Jewry."

His fellow officers noted he was under Hitler's influence and closely wedded to Nazi ideology. On German Heroes' Day (12 March) of 1944, Dönitz declared that, without Adolf Hitler, Germany would be beset by "the poison of Jewry", and the country destroyed for lack of the "uncompromising ideology" of Nazism:

What would have become of our country today, if the Führer had not united us under National Socialism? Divided along party lines, beset with the spreading poison of Jewry and vulnerable to it, because we lacked the defence of our present uncompromising ideology, we would have long since succumbed under the burden of this war and delivered ourselves to the enemy who would have mercilessly destroyed us.

At the Nuremberg trials, Dönitz claimed the statement about the "poison of Jewry" was regarding "the endurance, the power to endure, of the people, as it was composed, could be better preserved than if there were Jewish elements in the nation." Later, during the Nuremberg trials, Dönitz claimed to know nothing about the extermination of Jews and declared that "nobody among my men thought about violence against Jews." Dönitz told Leon Goldensohn, an American psychiatrist at Nuremberg, "I never had any idea of the goings-on as far as Jews were concerned. Hitler said each man should take care of his business and mine was U-boats and the Navy." Following the war, Dönitz tried to hide his knowledge of the Holocaust. He was present at the October 1943 Posen Conference where Heinrich Himmler described the mass murder of Jews with the intent of making the audience complicit in this crime. It cannot be proven beyond doubt that he was present during Himmler's segment of the conference, which openly discussed the mass murder of European Jews.

Even after the Nuremberg Trials, with the crimes of the Nazi state well known, Dönitz remained an antisemite. In April 1953, he told Speer that if it were the choice of the Americans and not the Jews, he would have been released.

== Nuremberg war crimes trials ==
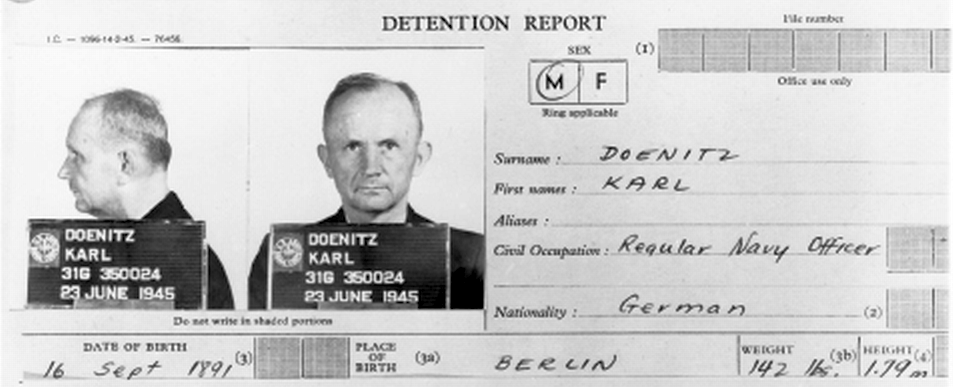
Dönitz's detention report, 1945

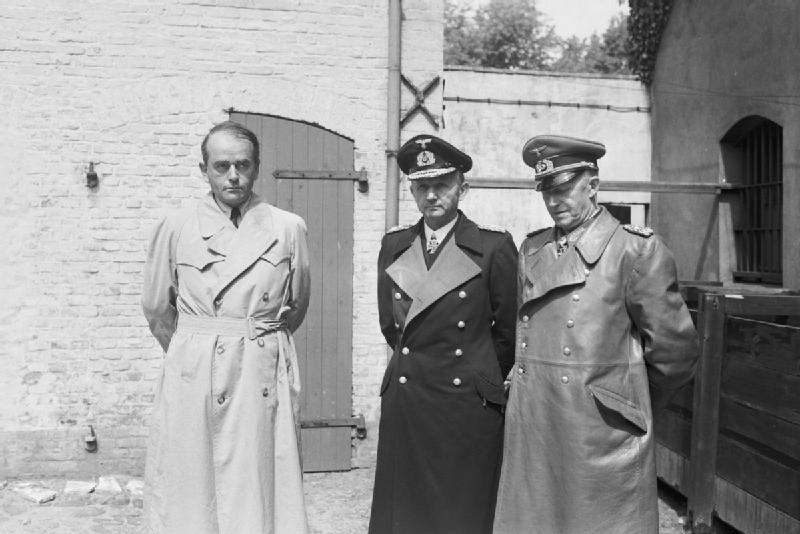
Albert Speer, Dönitz, and Alfred Jodl after their arrest

Following the war, Dönitz was held as a prisoner of war by the Allies. He was indicted as a major war criminal at the Nuremberg trials on three counts. One: conspiracy to commit crimes against peace, war crimes, and crimes against humanity. Two: planning, initiating, and waging wars of aggression. Three: crimes against the laws of war. Dönitz was found not guilty on count one of the indictment, but guilty on counts two and three.

During the trial, the army psychologist Gustave Gilbert was allowed to examine Nazi leaders on trial for war crimes. Among other tests, a German version of the Wechsler–Bellevue IQ test was administered. Dönitz and Hermann Göring scored 138, which made them equally the third-highest among the Nazi leaders tested. Dönitz was also examined by Chief Medical Officer Lt. Col. Rene Juchli, who reported that Dönitz suffered from "a chronic prostate disorder".

At the trial, Dönitz was charged with waging unrestricted submarine warfare against neutral shipping, permitting Hitler's Commando Order of 18 October 1942 to remain in full force when he became commander-in-chief of the Navy, and to that extent, responsibility for that crime. His defence was that the order excluded men captured in naval warfare, and that the order had not been acted upon by any men under his command. Added to that was his knowledge of 12,000 involuntary foreign workers working in the shipyards, and doing nothing to stop it. Dönitz was unable to defend himself on this charge convincingly when cross-examined by prosecutor Sir David Maxwell Fyfe.

On 25 February 1945, Hitler asked Dönitz whether the Geneva Convention should be renounced. Hitler's motives were twofold. The first was that reprisals could be taken against Western Allied prisoners of war; second, it would deter German forces from surrendering to the Western Allies, as was happening on the Eastern Front where the convention was in abeyance. Instead of arguing the conventions should never be renounced, Dönitz suggested it was not expedient to do so, so the court found against him on this issue; but as the convention was not renounced by Germany, and British prisoners in camps under Dönitz's jurisdiction were treated strictly according to the Convention, the Court considered these mitigating circumstances.

Among the war-crimes charges, Dönitz was accused of waging unrestricted submarine warfare for issuing War Order No. 154 in 1939, and another similar order after the Laconia incident in 1942, not to rescue survivors from ships attacked by submarines. By issuing these two orders, he was found guilty of causing Germany to be in breach of the Second London Naval Treaty of 1936. However, as evidence of similar conduct by the Allies was presented at his trial, his sentence was not assessed on the grounds of this breach of international law.

On the specific war crimes charge of ordering unrestricted submarine warfare, Dönitz was found "[not] guilty for his conduct of submarine warfare against British armed merchant ships", because they were often armed and equipped with radios, which they used to notify the admiralty of attack. As stated by the judges:

Dönitz is charged with waging unrestricted submarine warfare contrary to the Naval Protocol of 1936 to which Germany acceded, and which reaffirmed the rules of submarine warfare laid down in the London Naval Agreement of 1930 [...] The order of Dönitz to sink neutral ships without warning when found within these zones was, therefore, in the opinion of the Tribunal, a violation of the Protocol [...] The orders, then, prove Dönitz is guilty of a violation of the Protocol [...] The sentence of Dönitz is not assessed on the grounds of his breaches of the international law of submarine warfare.

His sentence on unrestricted submarine warfare was not assessed because of similar actions by the Allies. In particular, the British Admiralty, on 8 May 1940, had ordered all vessels in the Skagerrak sunk on sight, and Admiral Chester W. Nimitz, wartime commander-in-chief of the United States Pacific Fleet, stated the US Navy had waged unrestricted submarine warfare against Japan in the Pacific from the day the US officially entered the war. Thus, Dönitz was not charged with waging unrestricted submarine warfare against unarmed neutral shipping by ordering all ships in designated areas in international waters to be sunk without warning.

Dönitz was imprisoned for 10 years in Spandau Prison in what was then West Berlin. During his period in prison, he was unrepentant and maintained that he had done nothing wrong. He also rejected Speer's attempts to persuade him to end his devotion to Hitler and accept responsibility for the wrongs the German Government had committed. Conversely, over 100 senior Allied officers sent letters to Dönitz conveying their disappointment over the unfairness and verdict of his trial.

== Later years and death ==
Dönitz was released on 1 October 1956 and retired to the small village of Aumühle in Schleswig-Holstein in northern West Germany. There, he worked on two books. His memoirs, Zehn Jahre, Zwanzig Tage (Memoirs: Ten Years and Twenty Days), were released in Germany in 1958 and became available in an English translation the following year. This book recounted Dönitz's experiences as U-boat commander (10 years) and President of Germany (20 days). In it, Dönitz explains the Nazi regime as a product of its time, but argues he was not a politician and thus not morally responsible for many of the regime's crimes. He likewise criticises dictatorship as a fundamentally flawed form of government and blames it for many of the Nazi era's failings. The historian Alan P. Rems has written that Dönitz's memoirs are unconvincing and that, "unimpeded by a meaningful Nuremberg verdict, Dönitz fashioned a legend that could be embraced by the most unregenerate Nazis as well as credulous Allied officers who accepted his sanitised version of history and showered Dönitz with letters of support as a wronged brother-in-arms".

Dönitz's second book, Mein wechselvolles Leben (My Ever-Changing Life) is less known, perhaps because it deals with the events of his life before 1934. This book was first published in 1968, and a new edition was released in 1998 with the revised title Mein soldatisches Leben (My Martial Life). In 1973, he appeared in the Thames Television production The World at War, in one of his few television appearances.

Dönitz was unrepentant regarding his role in World War II, saying that he had acted at all times out of duty to his nation. In 1976, Dönitz appeared in The Memory of Justice. In the documentary, Dönitz discusses the Nuremberg trials and his experience of 1946 along with Albert Speer. He lived out the rest of his life in relative obscurity in Aumühle, occasionally corresponding with collectors of German naval history. Around 1974, Dönitz was contacted by the neo-Nazi conspiracy theorist and early Reichsbürger Manfred Roeder, who tried to prove that the German Reich still existed. Roeder assumed that Dönitz remained the legal head of state, but the former admiral considered the idea ridiculous and firmly stated that he no longer considered himself President of Germany. Regarding this as a resignation declaration, Roeder subsequently declared himself the new leader of Germany and eventually became active as a terrorist.

Dönitz died in Aumühle of a heart attack on Christmas Eve in 1980 at the age of 89. As the last German officer with the rank of Großadmiral (grand admiral), he was honoured by many former servicemen and foreign naval officers who came to pay their respects at his funeral on 6 January 1981. He was buried in Waldfriedhof Cemetery in Aumühle without military honours, and service members were not allowed to wear uniforms to the funeral. Also in attendance were over 100 holders of the Knight's Cross of the Iron Cross.

== Summary of career ==
=== Promotions ===
Kaiserliche Marine
1 April 1910:	Seekadett (Officer Cadet)
15 April 1911:	Fähnrich zur See (Midshipman)
27 September 1913:	Leutnant zur See (Acting Sub-Lieutenant)
22 March 1916:	Oberleutnant zur See (Sub-Lieutenant)
Reichsmarine
10 January 1921:	Kapitänleutnant (Lieutenant), with date of rank on 1 January 1921
1 November 1928:	Korvettenkapitän (Corvette Captain – Lieutenant Commander)
1 October 1933:	Fregattenkapitän (Frigate Captain – Commander)
Kriegsmarine
1 October 1935:	Kapitän zur See (Captain at Sea – Captain)
28 January 1939:	Kommodore (Commodore)
1 October 1939:	Konteradmiral (Rear Admiral)
1 September 1940:	Vizeadmiral (Vice Admiral)
14 March 1942:	Admiral (Admiral)
30 January 1943:	Großadmiral (Grand Admiral)

=== Decorations and awards ===
==== German ====
- General Honor Decoration (Allgemeines Ehrenzeichen) (7 June 1913)
- Iron Cross (1914)
  - 2nd class (7 September 1914)
  - 1st class (5 May 1916)
- Friedrich Cross of the Duchy of Anhalt, 1st class (17 January 1916)
- Knight of the Royal House Order of Hohenzollern with Swords (10 June 1918)
- Honour Cross of the World War 1914/1918 (30 January 1935)
- U-boat War Badge 1918 Version
- Special U-boat War Badge with diamonds (1939)
- Sudetenland Medal (20 December 1939)
- Clasp to the Iron Cross (1939)
  - 2nd class (18 September 1939)
  - 1st class (20 December 1939)
- Knight's Cross of the Iron Cross with Oak Leaves
  - Knight's Cross on 21 April 1940 as Konteradmiral and Befehlshaber der U-Boote (B.d.U.)
  - 223rd Oak Leaves on 6 April 1943 as Großadmiral and Oberbefehlshaber der Kriegsmarine and Befehlshaber der U-Boote
- Golden Party Badge of the National Socialist German Workers Party (1943)

==== Foreign ====
- Ottoman War Medal (7 November 1916) (Ottoman Empire)
- Order of the Medjidie, 4th class (13 March 1917) (Ottoman Empire)
  - Order of the Medjidie, 1st class (Ottoman Empire)
- Military Order of Savoy Knight Cross (20 April 1940) (Kingdom of Italy)
  - Military Order of Savoy Commander's Cross (7 November 1941) (Kingdom of Italy)
- Order of Naval Merit in white (10 June 1940) (Spanish State)
- Order of Michael the Brave, 2nd and 3rd class (7 April 1943) (Kingdom of Romania)
  - Order of Michael the Brave, 1st class (Kingdom of Romania)
- Order of the Rising Sun, First Class (11 September 1943) (Empire of Japan)
- Order of the Cross of Liberty Grand Cross with Swords (11 April 1944) (Finland)

== See also ==
- B-Dienst
- Glossary of German military terms
- Glossary of Nazi Germany
- List of Nazi Party leaders and officials

== Bibliography ==
- Beevor, Antony (2002). Berlin – The Downfall 1945. Viking-Penguin Books. ISBN 978-0-670-03041-5.
- Beevor, Antony (2011). Berlino 1945 (in Italian). Bur. ISBN 978-88-586-1832-5.
- Blair, Clay (1998). Hitler's U-boat War: Vol. II, The Hunted, 1942–1945. Random House. ISBN 978-0-679-45742-8.
- Boog, Horst; Rahn, Werner; Stumpf, Reinhard; Wegner, Bernd (2001). Germany and the Second World War: Volume 6: The Global War. Oxford University Press. ISBN 978-0-1982-2888-2.
- Buckley, John (1995). The RAF and Trade Defence, 1919–1945: Constant Endeavour. Ryburn Publishing. ISBN 1-85331-069-7.
- Busch, Rainer; Röll, Hans-Joachim (2003). Der U-Boot-Krieg 1939–1945 – Die Ritterkreuzträger der U-Boot-Waffe von September 1939 bis Mai 1945 [The U-Boat War 1939–1945 – The Knight's Cross Bearers of the U-Boat Force from September 1939 to May 1945] (in German). Hamburg, Berlin, Bonn: Verlag E.S. Mittler & Sohn. ISBN 978-3-8132-0515-2.
- Cowley, Robert; Parker, Geoffrey (2005). The Reader's Companion to Military History. Houghton Mifflin Harcourt. ISBN 978-0-547-56146-2.
- Doenitz, Karl (1959). Memoirs: Ten Years and Twenty Days Mass Market. Translated by Stevens, R. H. In collaboration with David Woodward (First Da Capo Press, 1997 ed.). Boston: Da Capo Press.
  - Dönitz, Karl (1997) [1958]. Zehn Jahre und zwanzig Tage: Erinnerungen 1935–1945 [Ten Years and Twenty Days: Memoirs 1935–1945] (in German) (11th ed.). Bernard und Graefe. ISBN 978-376375186-0.
- Dollinger, Hans (1997). The Decline and Fall of Nazi Germany and Imperial Japan. London: Bounty Books. ISBN 978-0-7537-0009-9. LCCN 67-27047.
- Fellgiebel, Walther-Peer (2000) [1986]. Die Träger des Ritterkreuzes des Eisernen Kreuzes 1939–1945 – Die Inhaber der höchsten Auszeichnung des Zweiten Weltkrieges aller Wehrmachtteile [The Bearers of the Knight's Cross of the Iron Cross 1939–1945 – The Owners of the Highest Award of the Second World War of all Wehrmacht Branches] (in German). Friedberg, Germany: Podzun-Pallas. ISBN 978-3-7909-0284-6.
- Frieser, Karl-Heinz; Schmider, Klaus; Schönherr, Klaus; Schreiber, Gerhard; Ungváry, Kristián; Wegner, Bernd (2007). Die Ostfront 1943/44 – Der Krieg im Osten und an den Nebenfronten [The Eastern Front 1943–1944: The War in the East and on the Neighbouring Fronts]. Das Deutsche Reich und der Zweite Weltkrieg [Germany and the Second World War] (in German). Vol. VIII. München: Deutsche Verlags-Anstalt. ISBN 978-3-421-06235-2.
- Gannon, Michael (1990). Operation Drumbeat: The Dramatic True Story of Germany's First U-boat Attacks Along the American Coast in World War II. Washington: Naval Institute Press. ISBN 978-1-59114-302-4.
- Gardner, W. J. R. (1999). Decoding History: The Battle of the Atlantic and Ultra. Palgrave Macmillan. ISBN 978-0-230-51014-2.
- Ginsburg, Tobias (2022) [2019]. Die Reise ins Reich: Unter Rechtsextremisten, Reichsbürgern und anderen Verschwörungstheoretikern [Journey into the Reich: Among far-right extremists, Reich Citizens and other conspiracy theorists] (2nd ed.). Hamburg: Rowohlt Taschenbuch Verlag. ISBN 978-3-499-00456-8.
- Goldensohn, Leon (2004). The Nuremberg Interviews. New York: Knopf. ISBN 978-1-4000-3043-9.
- Grier, Howard D. (2007). Hitler, Dönitz, and the Baltic Sea. The Third Reich's last hope. Naval Institute Press. ISBN 978-1-59114-345-1.
- Haarr, Geirr H. (2012). The Gathering Storm: The Naval War in Northern Europe September 1939 – April 1940. Seaforth Publishing. ISBN 978-1-84832-140-3.
- Hadley, Michael (1985). U-Boats Against Canada: German Submarines in Canadian Waters. Montreal: McGill–Queen's University Press. ISBN 978-0-7735-0811-8.
- Hamilton, Charles (1996). Leaders & Personalities of the Third Reich. Vol. 2. San José, CA: R. James Bender Publishing. ISBN 978-0-912138-66-4.
- Harris, Whitney (1999). Tyranny on Trial: The Trial of the Major German War Criminals at the End of World War II at Nuremberg, Germany, 1945–1946. Southern Methodist University Press. ISBN 978-0-8707-4436-5.
- Haslop, Dennis (2013). Britain, Germany and the Battle of the Atlantic: A Comparative Study. Bloomsbury Publishing. ISBN 978-1-4725-1163-8.
- Hendrie, Andrew (2006). The Cinderella Service: RAF Coastal Command 1939–1945. Pen and Sword Books. ISBN 978-1-84415-346-6.
- Hinsley, Francis (1993). British Intelligence in the Second World War: Volume 3, Part 2: Its Influence on Strategy and Operations [Abridged]. Her Majesty's Stationery Office. ISBN 978-0-670-03041-5.
- Hooton, E. R. (2010). The Luftwaffe: A Study in Air Power, 1933–1945. Classic Publications. ISBN 978-1-906537-18-0.
- Kelshall, Gaylord (1988). The U-Boat War in the Caribbean. Washington: Naval Institute Press. ISBN 978-1-55750-452-4.
- Kershaw, Ian (2008). Hitler: A Biography. New York: W. W. Norton & Company. ISBN 978-0-393-06757-6.
- Kohnen, David (1999). Commanders Winn and Knowles: winning the U-boat war with intelligence, 1939–1943. Enigma Press. ISBN 978-8-3861-1034-6.
- Kraus, Theodor; Dönitz, Karl (1933). Die Kreuzerfahrten der Goeben und Breslau [The Cruises of Goeben and Breslau] (in German). Berlin: Ullstein Verlag. OCLC 251295583.
- Macksey, Kenneth (2000). Without Enigma: The Ultra and Fellgiebel Riddles. London: Ian Allan Publishing. ISBN 978-0-7110-2766-4.
- Madsen, Chris (1998). The Royal Navy and German naval disarmament, 1942–1947. Taylor & Francis. ISBN 978-0-7146-4373-1.
- Matikkala, Antti (2017). Kunnian ruletti: Korkeimmat ulkomaalaisille 1941-1944 annetut suomalaiset kunniamerkit (in Finnish). Helsinki: Suomalaisen Kirjallisuuden Seura. ISBN 978-952-222-847-5.
- McDonald, Gabrielle (2000). Substantive and Procedural Aspects of International Criminal Law: The Experience of International and National Courts: Materials: 002. The Hague: Wolters Kluwer. ISBN 978-90-411-1135-7.
- Miller, David (2000). U-Boats: The Illustrated History of the Raiders of the Deep. Washington, D.C.: Brassey's. ISBN 978-1-57488-246-9.
- Milner, Marc (1994). The U-boat Hunters: The Royal Canadian Navy and the Offensive Against Germany's Submarines, 1943–1945. Naval Institute Press. ISBN 978-1-5575-0854-6.
- Milner, Marc (2011). Battle of the Atlantic. The History Press. ISBN 978-0-7524-6187-8.
- Moore, John Norton; Turner, Robert F. (1995). Readings on International Law from the Naval War College Review, 1978–1994. Vol. 65. Naval War College. ISBN 978-0-385-04961-0 – via Internet Archive.
- Morgan, Daniel; Taylor, Bruce (2011). U-Boat Attack Logs: A Complete Record of Warship Sinkings from Original Sources, 1939–1945. Seaforth Publishing. ISBN 978-1-84832-118-2.
- Mosley, Leonard (1974). The Reich Marshal: A Biography of Hermann Goering. Garden City, NJ: Doubleday (publisher). ISBN 978-0-385-04961-0 – via Internet Archive.
- National Archives (2001). The Rise and Fall of the German Air Force: 1933–1945. London: Public Record Office. ISBN 978-1-905615-30-8.
- Neitzel, Sönke (2003). "Kriegsmarine and Luftwaffe Co-operation in the War against Britain, 1939-1945". War in History. 10 (4): 448–463. doi:10.1191/0968344503wh285oa. ISSN 0968-3445. OCLC 437806787. S2CID 159960697.
- Niestlé, Axel (1998). German U-boat Losses During World War II: Details of Destruction. Naval Institute Press. ISBN 978-1-5575-0641-2.
- Oliver, Kingsley (2002). The RAF Regiment at War 1942–1946. Havertown: Pen and Sword Books. ISBN 978-1-78337-981-1.
- Overy, Richard J. (2002). War and Economy in the Third Reich. New York: Oxford University Press. ISBN 978-0-198-20599-9.
- Paterson, Lawrence (2001). First U-boat Flotilla. Leo Cooper (publisher). ISBN 978-0-8505-2917-3.
- Paterson, Lawrence (2003). Second U-boat Flotilla. Leo Cooper (publisher). ISBN 978-1-78337-967-5.
- Paterson, Lawrence (2007). U-boats in the Mediterranean 1941–1944. Naval Institute Press. ISBN 978-0-8117-1655-0.
- Price, Alfred (1980). Aircraft Versus Submarine: The Evolution of the Anti-submarine Aircraft, 1912 to 1980. Jane. ISBN 978-0-7106-0008-0.
- Rems, Alan P. (December 2015). "Götterdämmerung German Admirals on Trial". Naval History Magazine. Vol. 26, no. 6. Archived from the original on 18 August 2019.
- Rohwer, Jürgen (1996). War at Sea, 1939–1945. Naval Institute Press. ISBN 978-1-5575-0915-4.
- Rohwer, Jürgen (2015). Critical Convoy Battles of WWII: Crisis in the North Atlantic, March 1943. Stackpole Books. ISBN 978-0-8117-1655-0.
- Rohwer, Jürgen; Hümmelchen, Gerhard (2005). Chronology of the War at Sea, 1939–1945: The Naval History of World War Two. Annapolis, MD: United States Naval Institute. ISBN 978-1-59114-119-8.
- Ronzitti, Natalino (1988). The Law of Naval Warfare: A Collection of Agreements and Documents with Commentaries. Martinus Nijhoff. ISBN 978-90-247-3652-2.
- Roskill, Stephen (1954). The War at Sea, 1939–1945: The defensive. Her Majesty's Stationery Office.
- Scherzer, Veit (2007). Die Ritterkreuzträger 1939–1945 Die Inhaber des Ritterkreuzes des Eisernen Kreuzes 1939 von Heer, Luftwaffe, Kriegsmarine, Waffen-SS, Volkssturm sowie mit Deutschland verbündeter Streitkräfte nach den Unterlagen des Bundesarchives [The Knight's Cross Bearers 1939–1945 The Holders of the Knight's Cross of the Iron Cross 1939 by Army, Air Force, Navy, Waffen-SS, Volkssturm and Allied Forces with Germany According to the Documents of the Federal Archives] (in German). Jena, Germany: Scherzers Militaer-Verlag. ISBN 978-3-938845-17-2.
- Shirer, William (1983). The Rise and Fall of the Third Reich. New York: Fawcett Crest. ISBN 978-0-449-21977-5.
- Sprecher, Drexel (1999). Inside the Nuremberg Trial: A Prosecutor's Comprehensive Account. Vol. 2. University Press of America. ISBN 978-0-7618-1284-5.
- Steinweis, Alan E.; Rogers, Daniel E.; Grier, David (2003). The Impact of Nazism: New Perspectives on the Third Reich and its Legacy. Harris Center for Judaic Studies. ISBN 978-0-8032-4299-9.
- Stern, Robert (2003). Battle Beneath the Waves: U-boats at War. Castle Books. ISBN 978-0-7858-1682-9.
- Stetson, Damon (26 December 1980). "Doenitz Dies; Gave Up for Nazis; Admiral Doenitz Is Dead; Surrendered for the Nazis". The New York Times. ISSN 0362-4331.
- Syrett, David (1994). The Defeat of the German U-boats: The Battle of the Atlantic. Columbia: University of South Carolina Press. ISBN 978-1-41022-139-1 – via Internet Archive.
- Tarrant, E. V. (1994). The Last Year of the Kriegsmarine: May 1944 to May 1945. Maryland, MD: Naval Institute Press. ISBN 978-1-5575-0510-1.
- Tennent, Alan J. (2001). British and Commonwealth Merchant Ship Losses to Axis Submarines, 1939–1945. Stoud: Sutton. ISBN 978-0-7509-2760-4.
- Terraine, John (1989). Business in Great Waters: The U-Boat Wars, 1916–1945. London: Leo Cooper (publisher). ISBN 978-0-85052-760-5.
- Thomas, Charles (1990). The Germany Navy in the Nazi Era. London: Routledge. ISBN 978-0-0444-5493-9.
- Thomas, Franz (1997). Die Eichenlaubträger 1939–1945 Band 1: A–K [The Oak Leaves Bearers 1939–1945 Volume 1: A–K] (in German). Osnabrück: Biblio-Verlag. ISBN 978-3-7648-2299-6.
- Tucker, Spencer (2005). World War II: A Student Encyclopedia. ABC-Clio. ISBN 978-1-85109-857-6.
- Vause, Jordan (1997). Wolf: U-boat Commanders in World War II. Washington, D.C.: Naval Institute Press. ISBN 978-1-55750-874-4.
- Vego, Milan (2003). Naval Strategy and Operations in Narrow Seas. London: Frank Cass. ISBN 0-7146-5389-6.
- Vinocur, John (7 January 1981). "War Veterans Come To Bury, And To Praise Doenitz". The New York Times. ISSN 0362-4331.
- Walker, Andrew (2006). The Nazi War Trials. CPD. ISBN 978-1-903047-50-7.
- Westwood, David (2005). The U-Boat War: The German Submarine Service and the Battle of the Atlantic 1935–1945. Conway Publishing. ISBN 978-1-84486-001-2.
- Wette, Wolfram (2007). The Wehrmacht: History, Myth, Reality. Cambridge, MA: Harvard University Press. ISBN 978-0-674-02577-6.
- Wiggins, Melanie (1995). Torpedoes in the Gulf: Galveston and the U-Boats, 1942–1943. Texas: Texas A&M University Press. ISBN 978-0-8909-6627-3.
- Williamson, Gordon (2007). U-Boats vs Destroyer Escorts. U.K.: Osprey Publishing. ISBN 978-1-84603-133-5.
- Zabecki, David T. (2007). Dönitz: A Defense. Merriam-Webster. ISBN 978-1-57638-042-0.
- Zabecki, David T. (2014). Germany at War: 400 Years of Military History [4 volumes]: 400 Years of Military History. ABC-Clio. ISBN 978-1-59884-981-3.
- Zillmer, Eric A. (1995). The Quest for the Nazi Personality: a Psychological Investigation of Nazi War Criminals. Hillsdale, NJ: Lawrence Erlbaum Associates. ISBN 978-0-8058-1898-7 – via Internet Archive.
