= Wolfpack Seewolf =

Seewolf was the name of three separate wolfpacks of German U-boats that operated during the Battle of the Atlantic in World War II.

== 1941 ==
Wolfpack Seewolf 1
- Active: 2–15 September 1941
- Country: Nazi Germany
- Branch: Kriegsmarine
- Size: 17 submarines

The first U-boat group code-named Seewolf operated in the North Atlantic, to intercept Allied convoys to and from Gibraltar, and to and from Sierra Leone in west Africa. The group comprised 17 U-boats, from the dissolved groups Bosemuller and Kurfurst, that had operated in the same area. Due to bad weather, and evasive routing by the British, it had no success against the target convoys, though five independently routed ships were found and sunk; on 6 September U-95 sank Trinidad, a neutral vessel en route from Dublin to Lisbon, and on 15 September U-94 sank three ships that had dispersed from ON 14 the previous day. On 14 September U-95 and U-561 were bombed by aircraft from Coastal Command and forced to return to base.

Seewolf was formed on 2 September, and dissolved two weeks later, on 15 September 1941. It comprised the following boats:-

| U-boat | Commander | Date Joined | Date Left | Comments |
|---|---|---|---|---|
| U-69 | Wilhelm Zahn | 4 September 1941 | 15 September 1941 | |
| U-71 | Walter Flachsenberg | 2 September 1941 | 3 September 1941 | |
| U-77 | Heinrich Schonder | 2 September 1941 | 7 September 1941 | |
| U-83 | Hans-Werner Kraus | 2 September 1941 | 7 September 1941 | |
| U-94 | Otto Ites | 5 September 1941 | 15 September 1941 | Empire Eland; Newbury; Pegasus |
| U-95 | Gerd Schreiber | 2 September 1941 | 14 September 1941 | Trinidad |
| U-96 | Heinrich Lehmann-Willenbrock | 2 September 1941 | 10 September 1941 | |
| U-98 | Robert Gysae | 3 September 1941 | 15 September 1941 | |
| U-206 | Herbert Opitz | 2 September 1941 | 7 September 1941 | |
| U-553 | Karl Thurmann | 2 September 1941 | 13 September 1941 | |
| U-557 | Ottokar Arnold Paulssen | 2 September 1941 | 15 September 1941 | |
| U-558 | Günther Krech | 2 September 1941 | 12 September 1941 | |
| U-561 | Robert Bartels | 2 September 1941 | 15 September 1941 | |
| U-563 | Klaus Bargsten | 2 September 1941 | 7 September 1941 | |
| U-567 | Theodor Fahr | 2 September 1941 | 9 September 1941 | Fort Richepanse |
| U-568 | Joachim Preuss | 2 September 1941 | 8 September 1941 | |
| U-751 | Gerhard Bigalk | 2 September 1941 | 5 September 1941 | |

Five merchant ships were sunk for a total of 20,396 GRT.

== 1943 ==
Wolfpack Seewolf 2
- Active: 21–30 March 1943
- Country: Nazi Germany
- Branch: Kriegsmarine
- Size: 19 submarines

The second Seewolf group operated in the North Atlantic in March 1943 against convoys to and from North America. It comprised 19 U-boats, mostly from groups Sturmer and Dranger, which had attacked convoys HX 229 and SC 122. The group was positioned to intercept the fast HX and slow SC convoys from North America, and was co-incident with group Seeteufel, 16 U-boats positioned to attack outbound ON and ONS convoys. Convoys SC 123 and ONS 1 evaded both groups; several Seewolf boats found HX 230, but all attacks failed in foul weather. With no success to report, the group was dissolved and most boats returned to base, though four remained as a cadre for group Adler.

This Seewolf was formed on 21 March, and dissolved a week later on 30 March. It comprised the following boats:-

| U-boat | Commander | Date Joined | Date Left | Comments |
|---|---|---|---|---|
| U-84 | Horst Uphoff | 24 March 1943 | 30 March 1943 | |
| U-86 | Walter Schug | 21 March 1943 | 30 March 1943 | |
| U-257 | Heinz Rahe | 25 March 1943 | 30 March 1943 | |
| U-305 | Rudolf Bahr | 21 March 1943 | 30 March 1943 | |
| U-333 | Werner Schwaff | 21 March 1943 | 30 March 1943 | |
| U-336 | Hans Hunger | 21 March 1943 | 30 March 1943 | |
| U-373 | Paul-Karl Loeser | 21 March 1943 | 28 March 1943 | |
| U-440 | Hans Geissler | 21 March 1943 | 29 March 1943 | |
| U-441 | Klaus Hartmann | 21 March 1943 | 28 March 1943 | |
| U-527 | Herbert Uhlig | 21 March 1943 | 30 March 1943 | |
| U-530 | Kurt Lange | 21 March 1943 | 30 March 1943 | |
| U-590 | Heinrich Müller-Edzards | 21 March 1943 | 30 March 1943 | |
| U-591 | Hans-Jürgen Zetzsche | 21 March 1943 | 30 March 1943 | |
| U-615 | Ralph Kapitzky | 21 March 1943 | 30 March 1943 | |
| U-618 | Kurt Baberg | 21 March 1943 | 30 March 1943 | |
| U-631 | Jürgen Krüger | 21 March 1943 | 30 March 1943 | |
| U-641 | Horst Rendtel | 21 March 1943 | 30 March 1943 | |
| U-642 | Herbert Brünning | 21 March 1943 | 30 March 1943 | |
| U-666 | Herbert Engel | 21 March 1943 | 30 March 1943 | |

No ships were sunk or damaged

== 1945 ==
Wolfpack Seewolf 3
- Active: 12–23 April 1945
- Country: Nazi Germany
- Branch: Kriegsmarine
- Size: 7 submarines
- Engagements: Operation Teardrop; Actions of 5/6 May 1945

Seewolf was formed in March 1945 in an effort to re-establish the U-boat offensive in American waters; it was the last wolfpack of the Atlantic campaign. Seven of the nine boats that sailed to the Americas were in Seewolf; a further two sailed independently.

Coincidentally, Allied Intelligence formed the view that the Germans were planning to mount a missile attack on the United States, using V-1 or V-2 missiles adapted for launch at sea by submarines. This led to a vigorous response by the United States Navy, code-named Operation Teardrop, to find and destroy the Seewolf boats. This was successful; Of the five boats in American waters by April (two boats had returned to base for repairs, and were still in transit at the end of April) four boats were sunk during the month.

Seewolf boats had one success; U-546 sank USS Frederick C. Davis, shortly before she herself was sunk.

The fifth boat U-881 was detected and destroyed on 6 May 1945, the last boat in American waters to be destroyed. The two boats in transit when Germany surrendered were given up to the USN on 8 May 1945.

| U-boat | Commander | Date Joined | Date Left | Comments |
|---|---|---|---|---|
| U-518 | Hans-Werner Offermann | 14 April 1945 | 22 April 1945 | |
| U-546 | Paul Just | 14 April 1945 | 24 April 1945 | USS Frederick C. Davis sunk 24 Apr 1945 |
| U-805 | Richard Bernardelli | 14 April 1945 | 1 May 1945 | |
| U-858 | Thilo Bode | 14 April 1945 | 1 May 1945 | |
| U-880 | Gerhard Schtözau | 14 April 1945 | 16 April 1945 | |
| U-1235 | Franz Barsch | 14 April 1945 | 15 April 1945 | |

One US warship was sunk by this wolfpack.

== Bibliography ==
- Blair, Clay (1998). Hitler's U-Boat War [Volume 2]: The Hunted 1942–1945. Cassell. ISBN 0-304-35261-6.
- Edwards, Bernard (1996). Dönitz and the Wolf Packs – The U-boats at War. Cassell Military Classics. pp. 117, 119, 123–125. ISBN 0-304-35203-9.
