= German submarine U-881 =

German World War II submarine

History

Nazi Germany
- Name: U-881
- Ordered: 2 April 1942
- Builder: AG Weser, Bremen
- Yard number: 1089
- Laid down: 7 August 1943
- Launched: 4 March 1944
- Commissioned: 27 May 1944
- Fate: Sunk on 6 May 1945

General characteristics
- Class & type: Type IXC/40 submarine
- Displacement: 1,144 t (1,126 long tons) surfaced; 1,257 t (1,237 long tons) submerged
- Length: 76.76 m (251 ft 10 in) o/a; 58.75 m (192 ft 9 in) pressure hull
- Beam: 6.86 m (22 ft 6 in) o/a; 4.44 m (14 ft 7 in) pressure hull
- Height: 9.60 m (31 ft 6 in)
- Draught: 4.67 m (15 ft 4 in)
- Installed power: 4,400 PS (3,200 kW; 4,300 bhp) (diesels); 1,000 PS (740 kW; 990 shp) (electric)
- Propulsion: 2 shafts; 2 × diesel engines; 2 × electric motors
- Speed: 18.3 knots (33.9 km/h; 21.1 mph) surfaced; 7.3 knots (13.5 km/h; 8.4 mph) submerged
- Range: 13,850 nmi (25,650 km; 15,940 mi) at 10 knots (19 km/h; 12 mph) surfaced; 63 nmi (117 km; 72 mi) at 4 knots (7.4 km/h; 4.6 mph) submerged
- Test depth: 230 m (750 ft)
- Complement: 4 officers, 44 enlisted
- Armament: 6 × torpedo tubes (4 bow, 2 stern); 22 × 53.3 cm (21 in) torpedoes; 1 × 3.7 cm (1.5 in) Flak M42 AA gun; 2 x twin 2 cm (0.79 in) C/30 AA guns

Service record
- Part of: 4th U-boat Flotilla; 27 May 1944 – 28 February 1945; 33rd U-boat Flotilla; 1 March – 6 May 1945
- Identification codes: M 19 715
- Commanders: Kptlt. Dr. Karl-Heinz Frischke; 27 May 1944 – 6 May 1945
- Operations: 1 patrol: 7 April – 6 May 1945
- Victories: None

German submarine U-881 was a Type IXC/40 U-boat of Nazi Germany's Kriegsmarine during World War II. The ship was ordered on 2 April 1942, laid down on 7 August 1943, and launched on 4 March 1944. She was commissioned into the Kriegsmarine under the command of Kapitänleutnant Dr. Karl-Heinz Frischke (Crew 36) on 27 May 1944. Initially assigned to the 4th U-boat Flotilla, she was transferred to the 33rd U-boat Flotilla on 1 March 1945.

== Design ==
German Type IXC/40 submarines were slightly larger than the original Type IXCs. U-881 had a displacement of 1,144 tonnes (1,126 long tons) when at the surface and 1,257 tonnes (1,237 long tons) while submerged. The U-boat had a total length of 76.76 m (251 ft 10 in), a pressure hull length of 58.75 m (192 ft 9 in), a beam of 6.86 m (22 ft 6 in), a height of 9.60 m (31 ft 6 in), and a draught of 4.67 m (15 ft 4 in). The submarine was powered by two MAN M 9 V 40/46 supercharged four-stroke, nine-cylinder diesel engines producing a total of 4,400 metric horsepower (3,240 kW; 4,340 shp) for use while surfaced, two Siemens-Schuckert 2 GU 345/34 double-acting electric motors producing a total of 1,000 shaft horsepower (1,010 PS; 750 kW) for use while submerged. She had two shafts and two 1.92 m (6 ft) propellers. The boat was capable of operating at depths of up to 230 metres (750 ft).

The submarine had a maximum surface speed of 18.3 knots (33.9 km/h; 21.1 mph) and a maximum submerged speed of 7.3 knots (13.5 km/h; 8.4 mph). When submerged, the boat could operate for 63 nautical miles (117 km; 72 mi) at 4 knots (7.4 km/h; 4.6 mph); when surfaced, she could travel 13,850 nautical miles (25,650 km; 15,940 mi) at 10 knots (19 km/h; 12 mph). U-881 was fitted with six 53.3 cm (21 in) torpedo tubes (four fitted at the bow and two at the stern), 22 torpedoes, and a 3.7 cm (1.5 in) Flak M42 as well as two twin 2 cm (0.79 in) C/30 anti-aircraft guns. The boat had a complement of forty-eight.

== Service history ==
For her first patrol, U-881 was assigned to operate in US coastal waters with wolfpack Seewolf. During this operation U-881 was depth charged and sunk by the American destroyer escort USS Farquhar on 6 May 1945 in one of the last actions in American waters of the Atlantic campaign. She sank at position 43°18′N 47°44′W with the loss of all 54 men on board.

== Bibliography ==
- Blair, Clay (1998). Hitler's U-Boat War: The Hunted 1942-1945. Cassell. ISBN 0-304-35261-6.
- Busch, Rainer; Röll, Hans-Joachim (1999). German U-boat commanders of World War II : a biographical dictionary. Translated by Brooks, Geoffrey. London, Annapolis, Md: Greenhill Books, Naval Institute Press. ISBN 1-55750-186-6.
- Busch, Rainer; Röll, Hans-Joachim (1999). Der U-Boot-Krieg, 1939-1945: Deutsche U-Boot-Verluste von September 1939 bis Mai 1945 [German U-boat losses from September 1939 to May 1945] (in German). Vol. IV. Hamburg, Berlin, Bonn: Mittler. ISBN 3-8132-0514-2.
- Gröner, Eric; Jung, Dieter; Maass, Martin (1991). German Warships 1815-1945: U-boats and Mine Warfare Vessels. Vol. 2. Translated by Thomas, Keith; Magowan, Rachel. London: Conway Maritime Press. ISBN 0-85177-593-4.
- Tarrant, V. E. (1989). The U-Boat Offensive: 1914–1945. Annapolis, Maryland: Naval Institute Press. ISBN 978-0-87021-764-7. OCLC 20338385.
