= Actions of 5–6 May 1945 =

- Part of the Battle of the Atlantic, World War II
Date	5–6 May 1945
Location	Off Rhode Island and the Atlantic Ocean
Result	American victory

Belligerents
Germany	United States

Strength
Two submarines	Five warships Two blimps

Casualties and losses
Two submarines 109 killed	One merchant ship 12 killed

The last actions of the Battle of the Atlantic in American waters took place on 5–6 May 1945. There were two such actions, against U-853 off the Rhode Island coast and U-881, south of Cape Race, both sunk during the same period.

== Background ==
US involvement in the Battle of the Atlantic began with the deaths of 28 US citizens during the sinking of the Athenia by U-30, on the first day of the war in the west.

Thereafter US ships were attacked, and US warships involved in action against U-boats while protecting US interests, in the two years before America’s entry into the war. Following Nazi Germany’s declaration of war on the US on 11 December 1941, the U-boat Arm of the Kriegsmarine attacked American shipping in earnest in January 1942 with Operation Drumbeat, sinking over 600 ships (representing 3 million tons of shipping) over a six-month period.

Thereafter the U-boat Arm continued to make offensive patrols against US coastal shipping, while German wolf-packs searched for and attacked convoys in mid-ocean. By 1945 U-Boat actions had reduced to pinpricks, but their potential forced the Allies to maintain large naval and air forces, and expend considerable resources, to counter the threat.

During the first five months of 1945, the U-boat Arm dispatched 19 U-boat patrols to American waters, including seven sailings constituting group Seewolf, the last wolf pack of the Battle of the Atlantic. By 5 May 1945, the day U-boat Command (BdU) ordered the U Boat Arm to cease hostilities, just nine were still at large; six off the US coast, and three Seewolf boats in mid-ocean. Of these, two were involved in action with the USN, the last actions in American waters during the Atlantic campaign.

== First action ==
On 5 May, U-853, lying in wait off Point Judith, Rhode Island, sighted and fired on SS Black Point, a collier underway for Boston, Massachusetts. Her torpedoes struck, and within 15 minutes, Black Point had capsized in 95 ft (29 m) of water, the last US-flagged merchant ship sunk in World War II. Twelve men died and 34 were rescued. One of the rescuing ships — SS Kamen — sent a report of the torpedoing that was picked up by the destroyer USS Ericsson, destroyer escorts USS Amick and Atherton, and frigate USS Moberly; they discovered U-853 bottomed in 108 ft (33 m), and dropped more than 100 depth charges through the night. The next morning, two blimps from Lakehurst, New Jersey — K-16 and K-58 — joined the attack, locating oil slicks and marking suspected locations with smoke and dye markers. K-16 also attacked with 7.2 in (180 mm) rocket bombs. Finally, planking, life rafts, a chart tabletop, clothing, and an officer's cap floated to the surface, indicating destruction with all 55 men. U-853 was destroyed at sometime between midnight, when success was first claimed, and 1225, when it was confirmed.

== Second action ==
Also on 6 May, shortly after day-break, the destroyer escort USS Farquhar — assigned to the Mission Bay hunter-killer group — detected U-881, a Seewolf boat running submerged 300 mi (260 nmi; 480 km) south-east of Cape Race. Making a sudden attack, Farquhar closed and dropped 13 depth charges in a single attack, which destroyed U-881 with the loss of all hands.

== Conclusion ==
These were the last U-boats destroyed in action in American waters; on 8 May, the Germans surrendered, and the last active U-boats in American waters gave themselves up to units of the USN and RCN.

== See also ==
- Operation Teardrop
- Actions of 7–8 May 1945
