= USS Wilhoite =

1943 Edsall-class destroyer escort

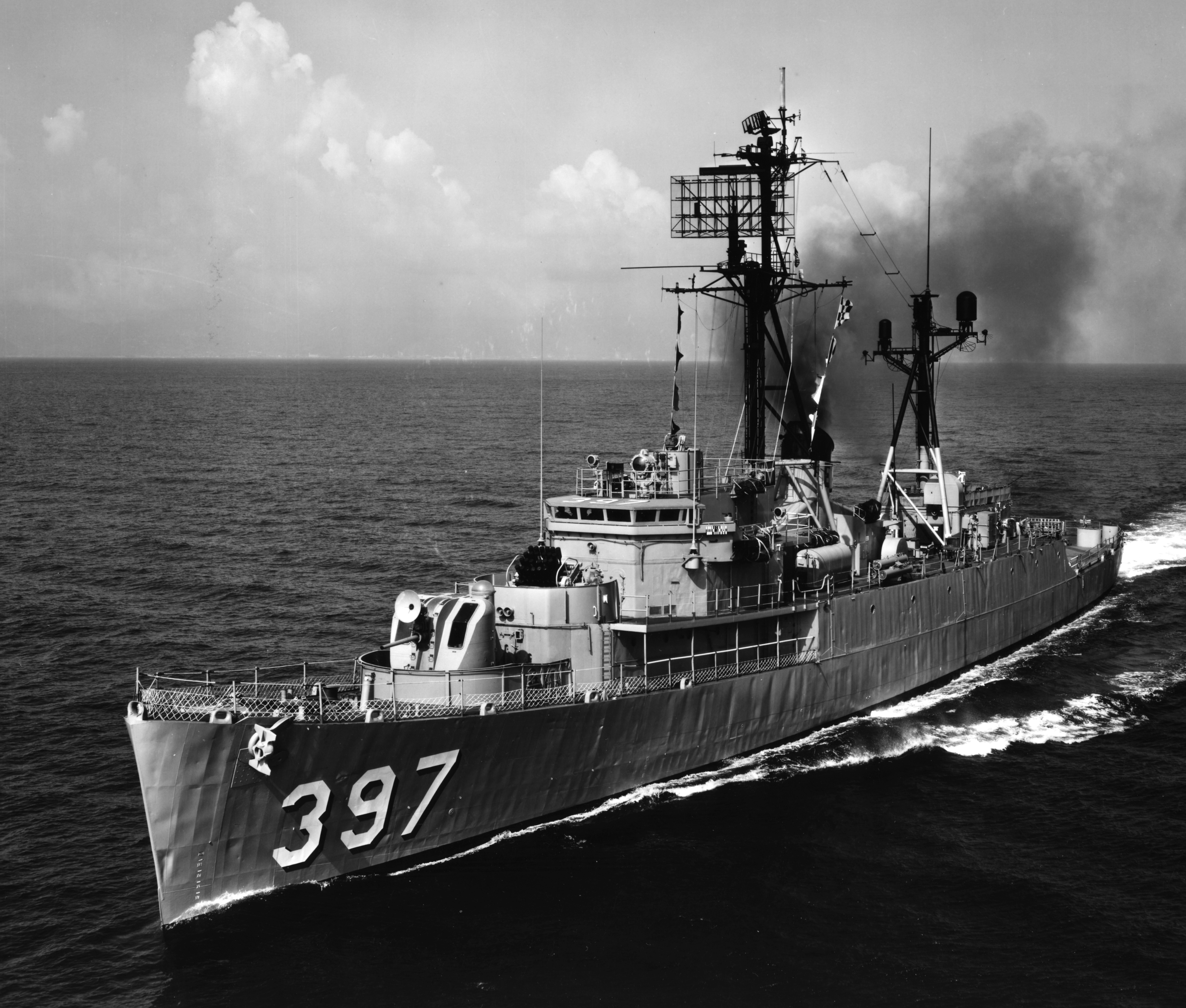

History

United States
- Namesake: Thomas Mack Wilhoite
- Builder: Brown Shipbuilding, Houston, Texas
- Laid down: 4 August 1943
- Launched: 5 October 1943
- Commissioned: 16 December 1943
- Decommissioned: 2 July 1969
- Reclassified: DER-397, 2 September 1954
- Stricken: 2 July 1969
- Fate: Sold for scrapping, 19 July 1972

General characteristics
- Class & type: Edsall-class destroyer escort
- Displacement: 1,253 tons standard; 1,590 tons full load
- Length: 306 feet (93.27 m)
- Beam: 36.58 feet (11.15 m)
- Draft: 10.42 full load feet (3.18 m)
- Propulsion: 4 FM diesel engines, 4 diesel-generators, 6,000 shp (4.5 MW), 2 screws
- Speed: 21 knots (39 km/h)
- Range: 9,100 nmi. at 12 knots; (17,000 km at 22 km/h)
- Complement: 8 officers, 201 enlisted
- Armament: 3 × single 3 in (76 mm)/50 guns; 1 × twin 40 mm AA guns; 8 × single 20 mm AA guns; 1 × triple 21 in (533 mm) torpedo tubes; 8 × depth charge projectors; 1 × depth charge projector (hedgehog); 2 × depth charge tracks

USS Wilhoite (DE-397) was an Edsall-class destroyer escort built for the United States Navy during World War II. She served in the Atlantic Ocean and the Pacific Ocean and provided destroyer escort protection against submarine and air attack for Navy vessels and convoys.

== Namesake ==
Thomas Mack Wilhoite was born on 12 February 1921 in Guthrie, Kentucky. He enlisted in the U.S. Naval Reserve on 16 June 1941 at Atlanta, Georgia, and received his aviation indoctrination training at the Naval Reserve Air Base, Atlanta, Georgia. On 7 August, he reported for flight instruction at the Naval Air Station Pensacola Florida, and was appointed an aviation cadet the following day. Transferred to NAS, Miami, Florida, on 15 January 1942 for further training, he became a naval aviator on 6 February. Three days later, he was commissioned an ensign and, at the end of February, reported to the Advanced Carrier Training Group, Atlantic Fleet, NAS, Norfolk, Virginia. There, he joined Fighting Squadron (VF) 9, then fitting out and, in time, became the assistant navigation officer for that squadron.

Operation Torch, the invasion of French North Africa, saw VF-9 assigned to the carrier USS Ranger. Each section of the squadron drew assigned tasks on 8 November 1942, the first day of the landings; and he flew one of five Grumman F4F Wildcats which attacked the French airdrome at Rabat-Sale, the headquarters of the French air forces in Morocco. Despite heavy antiaircraft fire, he pressed home a determined attack and set three French bombers afire with his guns. In a second strike directed at the Port Lyautey airdrome later that day, he flew as part of the third flight and destroyed one fighter, a Dewoitine 520 by strafing. However his Wildcat took hits from the intense fire and crashed about one mile from Port Lyautey. He was posthumously awarded the Silver Star.

== Construction and commissioning ==
She was laid down on 4 August 1943 at Houston, Texas, by the Brown Shipbuilding Co.; launched on 5 October 1943; sponsored by Mrs. Corinne M. Wilhoite, the mother of Ensign Wilhoite; and commissioned at Houston on 16 December 1943.

== World War II North Atlantic operations ==
After her shakedown out of Great Sound, Bermuda, from 9 January to 10 February 1944, Wilhoite underwent post-shakedown availability at the Charleston Navy Yard from 11 to 21 February. She then got underway for Gibraltar with Convoy UGS (United States to Gibraltar) 34 on 23 February. On two occasions during the voyage, the destroyer escort depth charged presumed submarine contacts with inconclusive results. After turning the convoy over to British escort vessels once she had passed through the Strait of Gibraltar, Wilhoite returned to the United States with Convoy GUS (Gibraltar to the United States) 33 and arrived at New York City on 3 April.

After a 10-day availability at the New York Navy Yard, the destroyer escort operated briefly with submarines and PT boats and conducted antiaircraft firing practice in Block Island Sound, Brooklyn, New York, before shifting south to the Tidewater area to pick up Convoy UGS-40 in Hampton Roads late in April, led by the Campbell.

The transatlantic passage proved largely uneventful; but, as the Allied ships transited the Strait of Gibraltar, the British antiaircraft cruiser HMS Caledon, the destroyer Benson, and two minesweepers equipped with special jamming apparatus, Steady and Sustain, joined the convoy. A recent increase in German air activity had prompted concern over the safety of UGS-40, a large and important convoy consisting of some 80 vessels.

== Attacked by Luftwaffe aircraft ==
At 2106 on 11 May, Wilhoite's search radar picked up "bogeys" some 18 miles (29 km) northeast of UGS-40. Two minutes later, the screening ships commenced their barrage. Observers in Wilhoite saw the attacking planes, torpedo-carrying Junkers Ju 88s, sheer away from the flak, fly aft along the transport screen to the northward, and then cut across the stern of the convoy, circling. Soon, as the Ju 88s came around the stern of the convoy, Wilhoite, coordinating the defense of that sector, sent up several barrages with her 3-inch, 40- and 20-millimeter guns.

About 2123, one Ju. 88 singled out Wilhoite as her target and attacked. The destroyer escort responded by bringing all her guns to bear and fired such a heavy and accurate barrage that the German pilot dropped his torpedo about 2,000 yards (1,800 m) from its target. The plane, apparently damaged by the flak, then banked sharply and disappeared in the ship's smoke screen.

== Heavy Luftwaffe losses ==
The heavy antiaircraft fire from the convoy's escorts and the support by friendly fighters downed an estimated 17 of the enemy torpedo planes. The convoy itself suffered no losses and safely reached its destination, Bizerte, Tunisia. For his part in directing Wilhoite's highly successful sector defense of UGS-40, Lt. Roth, the ship's commanding officer, received a Letter of Commendation.

== Sinking of Block Island ==
Wilhoite rested at Bizerte from 13 to 21 May before getting underway to return to the United States with Convoy GUS-40. At 21:05 on 29 May, however, Wilhoite and Evarts were detached from the screen of GUS-40 to go to the aid of Task Group (TG) 21.11 which the German submarine U-549 had brazenly attacked northwest of the Canary Islands, torpedoing Block Island and Barr. The former sank quickly, but the latter remained afloat while Ahrens and Eugene E. Elmore cooperated in sinking the U-boat. The latter then took the stricken Barr in tow.

Wilhoite and Evarts arrived on the scene at 17:15 on the 30th; soon thereafter, Robert I. Paine and Ahrens sailed for Casablanca, Morocco. The remaining ships then set course for Casablanca as well, avoiding the track of two homeward-bound U-boats reportedly in the area. On the 31st, the small seaplane tender Humboldt arrived and assumed command over the little force.

At 09:30 on 1 June, Eugene E. Elmore cast off the tow of Barr, and Wilhoite picked it up. Moving ahead at eight knots, Wilhoite towed the damaged Barr, despite the letter's cracked hull which made the task of pulling the ship immeasurably more difficult by causing the damaged ship to yaw. Good damage control in Barr later lessened that problem; and, as the convoy neared Casablanca on 5 June, a Dutch tug, HMRT Antic, joined and took the damaged destroyer escort in tow, relieving Wilhoite. PC-480 then relieved Wilhoite and Evarts of screening duties as the ships neared the swept channel at their destination.

== Commended for towing Barr to safety ==
Upon finishing fueling at Casablanca, Wilhoite departed that Moroccan port, her commanding officer, Lt. Roth, having earned a second Letter of Commendation for his ship's performance in towing Barr to safety, and sailed to New York with GUS-41. After her arrival there, the ship received repairs at the New York Navy Yard before she sailed on 24 June for battle practices in Casco Bay, Maine. She later acted as a target in training exercises for submarines operating out of New London, Connecticut, before she once more touched at New York and shifted south to Norfolk, Virginia, where, on 21 July, she joined a hunter-killer task group based around the escort carrier Bogue.

Four days after her assignment to Bogue's group, TG 22.3, Wilhoite sortied with that carrier and the rest of her screen, Haverfield, Swenning, Willis, and Janssen, bound for Bermuda. While exercising in that area on antisubmarine warfare (ASW) exercises and night battle practice, Bogue and her consorts honed their respective and collective skills in those areas for the rest of July and into the following month.

At 06:30 on 3 August, however, a message arrived that abruptly cut short the training. TG 22.3 was to proceed to the vicinity of 46°15′N 21°15′W for offensive operations against a westbound enemy submarine. At 1646 on the next day, Wilhoite picked up a sound contact and attacked at 17:02; listeners picked up seven detonations but could ascertain no positive results. At 14:05 on the 7th, the destroyer escort laid two "hedgehog" projectile patterns and one standard depth charge pattern on a target later evaluated as a school of fish.

Undaunted, the Bogue group pressed on with the hunt. Their vigilance and training ultimately paid off. At 00:43 on 19 August, night-flying aircraft from Bogue attacked a submarine running on the surface. Wilhoite was the first ship to hear the transmission and relayed it to Bogue. Six minutes later, Haverfield, Janssen, and Swenning headed for the scene, detached to take part in the hunt while Wilhoite and Willis remained with Bogue as her screen. Meanwhile, the carrier launched planes, maintaining the start of a continuous air patrol over the area.

Unfortunately, the trio of destroyer escorts returned empty handed at 12:25 on the 20th. However, no sooner had they returned, when carrier aircraft reported attacking a submarine that had just surfaced. Wilhoite, Janssen, Haverfield, and Willis headed for the scene, a spot some 60 nautical miles (110 km) distant, hearing a report at 14:43 that the submarine (which had apparently submerged but had been damaged and brought to the surface) had again surfaced and was under attack.

== Sinking of German Submarine U-1229 ==
Ultimately, the planes from Composite Squadron 42, flying from Bogue, inflicted enough damage on the submarine, later identified as German submarine U-1229, to force the German crew to abandon ship. While Bogue's airmen watched, U-1229's crew went over the side. The submarine, scuttling charges apparently set, exploded and settled into the Atlantic. Later, at 16:10, the destroyer escorts arrived on the scene; Wilhoite picked up one body of a German sailor, who was summarily buried at sea. Janssen picked up U-1229's survivors.

Wilhoite, along with the other units of TG 22.3, later received the Presidential Unit Citation for the group's submarine-hunting activities. Wilhoite had been a part of the powerful and sustained offensive during a period of heavy U-boat activity threatening the uninterrupted flow of supplies to the European theater that, since the Allied invasion of France in June 1944, had assumed great importance. As the citation text concluded: "The gallantry and superb teamwork of the officers and men who fought the embarked planes and who manned Bogue and her escort vessels were largely instrumental in forcing the complete withdrawal of enemy submarines from supply routes essential to the maintenance of our established military supremacy."

But, for ships like Wilhoite, there was little time to rest on her laurels. Germany was not beaten yet; there would still be more U-boats to fight. Proceeding to Argentia after TG 22.3's kill of U-1229, Wilhoite and her consorts again went after enemy submarines reported in that area. Attacks made over a three-day period, 8, 9, and 10 September, were all unsuccessful. Wilhoite then patrolled off the Grand Banks before she sailed for the New York Navy Yard at the end of September for voyage repairs.

Upon completion of her yard period on 7 October, Wilhoite trained off Montauk Point, Long Island, in ASW tactics before she got underway for Norfolk on 14 October with the remainder of CortDiv 51. Joining Bogue at Norfolk and becoming TG 33.3, the ships headed south to Bermuda, arriving there on 23 October. Wilhoite and her consorts subsequently trained in ASW tactics out of Great Sound, Bermuda, into November.

Wilhoite returned to New York with TG 33.3 before the unit put to sea for a "barrier patrol" between Brown's Bank and the Nova Scotia entrance to the Gulf of Maine in early December. Detached from Bogue's screen at 12:35 on 7 December, Wilhoite assisted Cockrill in developing a sonar contact until 11 December, when Wilhoite headed for Norfolk.

Wilhoite rejoined Bogue's screen and departed Norfolk on the day after Christmas 1944, bound for Bermuda. The destroyer escort patrolled with TG 22.3 out of Port Royal Bay before she returned to New York for repairs on 16 January 1945. Wilhoite resumed operations with that illustrious aircraft carrier on 20 January, planeguarding for her as she conducted carrier qualifications (carquals) off Quonset Point, Rhode Island.

Detached from that duty on the 21st, Wilhoite sailed for Casco Bay, Maine, where she exercised in ASW and gunnery for a week. She again screened and plane-guarded for Bogue off Quonset Point into early February, while the carrier once more ran carquals for her embarked air group. The destroyer escort then spent a period of availability at the New York Navy Yard from 8 to 19 February before she engaged in training operations into late March, out of Casco Bay and Portsmouth, New Hampshire.

Wilhoite departed Casco Bay on 28 March and, on the. following day, rendezvoused with TG 22.14—the unit assigned the task of hunting a reported southbound U-boat placed by intelligence information at 46°45′N 41°30′W. At 11:39 on 31 March, Janssen's part of Task Unit (TU) 22.3.1—made a sound contact. Wilhoite picked it up soon thereafter and attacked at 1146, her "hedgehog" hurling a pattern of projectiles six minutes later. She left two deep explosions soon thereafter but could ascertain no evidence of having scored any hits.

== Attacked by an iceberg ==
After another brief period of unsuccessful "barrier patrols" between 1 and 6 April, Wilhoite trained out of New London, Connecticut, in ASW tactics with USS Mackerel and units of Hague's TG 22.3, before she resumed active U-boat hunting activities. At 23:27 on 19 April, Wilhoite went to general quarters to investigate a radar contact and, at 23:43, illuminated the area with star shell. The object of the attention turned out to be a large, drifting iceberg.

Meanwhile, the war on the European continent had been nearing its end; but the Battle of the Atlantic continued. Soon after the encounter with the iceberg, Wilhoite resumed "barrier patrols" with Bogue's TG 22.3. She was screening the carrier when Bogue's planes spotted a U-boat running on the surface at 1300 on 23 April. The aircraft attacked, but the U-boat "pulled the plug" and went deep in time to escape.

== U-546 sinks Frederick C. Davis ==
The next day, U-546 torpedoed and sank Frederick C. Davis, the last American combatant ship loss in the Battle of the Atlantic. However, the U-boat had little time to savor the victory, for the entire scouting line of destroyer escorts moved swiftly to the scene to rescue their sistership's survivors and to commence ASW operations. U-546 was brought to the surface, damaged, and sunk by gunfire from the destroyer escorts, quickly avenging Frederick C. Davis's loss.

Over the next few days, Wilhoite conducted more "barrier patrols" as part of a group of warships carrying out sweeps in scouting line formation. The ships formed around two escort carriers, Bogue and Card, the former patrolling to the south, the latter to the north.

At 20:00 on 7 May, Wilhoite, Haverfield, and Flaherty proceeded to the scene of a "disappearing radar contact" that had been made by Otter. At 2125, Wilhoite reached the point of contact and commenced a search in company with Haverfield, Flaherty, Otter, Swenning and Varian. At 22:02, however, the search was cancelled abruptly, and the ships returned to their previous scouting line stations. While the ships had been engaged in their search, Germany, worn down by pressure from the western Allies on the one hand and the ceaseless heavy pressure by the Russians on the other, surrendered at Reims, France, on 7 May. World War II, as far as the European theater was concerned, was over.

== Stateside repairs ==
Nevertheless, Wilhoite remained at sea on "barrier patrol" until 9 May, when she headed for New York City. The destroyer escort was repaired there from 11 to 19 May before she shifted south for more major repairs and alterations at the Charleston Naval Shipyard in preparation for the ship's upcoming deployment to the Pacific, still very much an active theater of war in the spring of 1945.

== Transfer to Pacific Theatre operations ==
Wilhoite trained at Guantánamo Bay after her refit at Charleston and then headed for the Pacific, transiting the Panama Canal on 16 July. Arriving at San Diego, California, on the 24th, Wilhoite sailed for Hawaii with CortDiv 59 -- Edsall, Stewart, and Moore—arriving there on 5 August. In ensuing days, Wilhoite and her consorts trained in Hawaiian waters.

Wilhoite had arrived too late to participate in active operations, however, because the war in the Pacific ended while she was training in the Hawaiian Islands. On 14 August 1945 (west of the International Date Line), the Japanese capitulated.

Wilhoite departed Pearl Harbor on 20 August bound for Saipan in the Marianas. After her arrival there, she escorted SS Sea Sturgeon to Okinawa in company with the minesweeper Ptarmigan. While engaged in that local escort duty, Wilhoite was forced to reverse course off Okinawa during a typhoon; the ship did not enter Buckner Bay, but proceeded instead back to Saipan.

Meanwhile, the surrender of Japanese garrisons was proceeding apace. In late September, Wilhoite sailed for Marcus Island, relieving Gilmore there as station ship on 27 September. Anchoring off the south shore of the island, Wilhoite supported the small American occupying force in case of any trouble with the garrison of some 2,400 Japanese troops still on the island. By 8 October, the latter was on board the transport Daikai Maru and on its way back to Japan. Wilhoite, herself, in company with LCI-336, departed Marcus on 12 October, bound for Saipan.

Wilhoite subsequently operated on local escort missions to Pagan Island, Agrihan Island, and Iwo Jima and then she supported the American occupation of Japan until 6 January 1946. At that time, the destroyer escort—her task in the Far East completed—sailed for the United States, via Saipan and Pearl Harbor. After touching at San Diego, she proceeded on to New York, via the Panama Canal. Following a complete overhaul at the New York Naval Shipyard, Wilhoite shifted south to Green Cove Springs, Florida, where she was decommissioned on 19 June 1946 and placed in the Atlantic Reserve Fleet.

== Converted to Radar Picket Ship ==
Her sojourn in reserve was to last through the Korean War of 1950 to 1953. Taken out of reserve and reactivated in 1954, Wilhoite underwent an extensive conversion to a radar picket ship, receiving sophisticated radar equipment.

Reclassified to DER-397 on 2 September 1954, Wilhoite was recommissioned on 29 January 1955 at the Charleston Naval Shipyard but remained in dockyard hands at Charleston for final installation of equipment and further tests until 22 March. She then proceeded, via Norfolk, Virginia, to Guantánamo Bay, Cuba, for a rigorous 10-week shakedown. After her post-shakedown availability, Wilhoite sailed for the Pacific on 20 July; she officially became part of the Pacific Fleet's Cruiser-Destroyer Force on the 24th.

Upon her arrival at her new home port, Seattle, Washington, on 12 August, Wilhoite became a unit of CortRon 5 and soon commenced what would become a regular routine of duty as a coastal radar picket ship under the overall direction of Commander, Western Continental Air Defense Command. In the next three years and seven months, Wilhoite conducted a total of 30 picket tours before she sailed for Hawaii and her new home port of Pearl Harbor on 4 March 1959.

== Support North Pacific and Deep Freeze '61 operations ==
For the next four years, Wilhoite operated out of Pearl Harbor on "barrier patrols" and special operations; ranging as far north as Adak, Alaska, where, on one occasion in December 1964, a heavy storm with 50-knot (93 km/h) winds buffeted the ship against a pier, causing some damage. In 1961, Wilhoite took part in Operation "Deep Freeze '61", crossing the Antarctic Circle on 8 February. During that cruise, she visited ports in New Zealand and Australia before she returned to Pearl Harbor via Pago Pago, Samoa.

== Mission of mercy ==
Besides "special operations" on "barrier patrols" from Pearl Harbor, Wilhoite carried out search and rescue (SAR) missions, ready for any eventuality while on station. During her third SAR patrol, in the autumn of 1963, the ship sighted an approaching Japanese fishing vessel, Kayo Maru. Wilhoite subsequently took on board Eichi Nakata, a man who had been bitten by a shark, and carried him to Midway Island, where he received medical treatment. After that mission of mercy, Wilhoite returned to Pearl Harbor on 22 October 1963.

== Supporting Vietnam War operations ==
By the mid-1960s, however, further changes were in store for the veteran warship. The growing pace of incursions by North Vietnamese-backed Viet Cong communist guerrillas against South Vietnam had resulted in escalating American support of the latter. Wilhoite accordingly was deployed to the Western Pacific (WestPac) in the spring of 1965, beginning a cycle of WestPac tours that lasted into 1969.

Wilhoite conducted intermittent WestPac deployments, with corresponding Operation Market Time patrols off the coast of Vietnam, into January 1969. Hers was unsung duty—long hours of ceaseless patrol, aiding the fledgling South Vietnamese Navy in detecting and preventing supplies, weapons, and other materials from being infiltrated into South Vietnam by the Viet Cong and the North Vietnamese. Often assisted by only two small boats, a Coast Guard patrol boat and aircraft, Wilhoite upon occasion had the responsibility for patrol over 2,750 square miles (7,100 km^{2}) of ocean—an ample assignment for a ship with the size and range of a radar picket destroyer escort.

On 19 June 1967, Wilhoite relieved Kretschmer on Operation Market Time station and assumed the duties of "mother ship" to two Navy "Swift" (PCF) boats, providing berthing accommodations for extra crew members and supplying them with food, fuel, and fresh water.

At approximately 20:00 on 11 July, a "Market Time" patrol aircraft detected a steel-hulled trawler running darkened some 55 miles (89 km) from the coast of South Vietnam, on a westerly heading. Wilhoite, notified by radio of the trawler's course, set hers to close and identify the ship, commencing covert surveillance as soon as she picked up radar contact. The next morning, 12 July, Wilhoite closed for identification purposes but later opened the range. By that point, the trawler had changed course, heading away from the coast; Wilhoite accordingly maintained surveillance for three more days. Entering the "Market Time" area, the trawler drew more pursuers – Gallup, Point Orient, and PCF-79. On 15 July, Wilhoite intercepted the unidentified trawler five miles (8 km) from the beach. Ignoring calls to surrender broadcast by a psychological warfare unit embarked in Point Orient, the trawler was soon taken under fire, running aground in flames on a sandbar at the mouth of the River De Say Ky in Quang Ngai province.

Throughout the night, Wilhoite and the other ships intermittently fired into the beached trawler; the following morning, a party went on board the wreck to inspect the damage and learn the nature of her cargo. The holds were found jammed with guns, ammunition, and explosives—the largest arms cache captured during the Vietnam War. Ultimately relieved of her "Market Time" patrol duties on 26 July, Wilhoite sailed for Hong Kong and a period of recreation.

Alternating the tours of duty on Market Time stations with periods in port at Hong Kong, Sasebo, and Yokosuka, Wilhoite periodically returned to such ports as Pearl Harbor and Subic Bay.

On 6 September 1968, Wilhoite was called upon to perform an SAR mission, while she was riding out the tail-end of Typhoon Bess. Assigned to locate a lost Vietnamese Navy PGM, Wilhoite centered her search on a point some 30 miles (48 km) from the port of Da Nang. Although she never sighted the PGM, however, the radar picket destroyer escort maintained contact via voice radio; and ultimately, the PGM was able to reorient herself and continue on her voyage. Later, while returning to her patrol station, Wilhoite came across an Army landing craft, LCU-1481, which had been adrift and lost for some 48 hours. Typhoon "Bess" had proved a nuisance to the LCU, for it had caused damage that had rendered the craft powerless. Wilhoite stood by while another LCU was dispatched from Da Nang to take the stricken LCU-1481 in tow and bring her to port safely.

Later that autumn, Wilhoite received an availability alongside the veteran destroyer tender Dixie at Subic Bay from 25 to 28 September. On the latter day, the radar picket destroyer escort sortied for "Market Time" once more, relieving the Coast Guard cutter USCGC Ingham on station. Wilhoite later saw her first action of that deployment when she was called upon to deliver gunfire support in an area north of An Thoi. There, Wilhoite shelled an area heavily infested with Viet Cong, destroying or damaging several enemy junks that had attempted to infiltrate matériel from the north.

Wilhoite departed Vietnamese waters on 15 January 1969, bound for Hawaii. She stopped for fuel at Subic Bay and at Apra Harbor, Guam, before she continued on, arriving at Pearl Harbor on 1 February. After a period of tender availability alongside Isle Royale, from 17 February to 3 March, Wilhoite underwent a restricted availability at the Pearl Harbor Naval Shipyard before she conducted her sea trials at the end of May. On 2 June, the radar picket destroyer escort departed the Hawaiian Islands for the west coast; and she arrived at Bremerton, Washington, a week later. There, on 2 July, Wilhoite was decommissioned.

== Final deactivation ==
Simultaneously struck from the Navy List, Wilhoite was sold on 19 July 1972 to General Metals Corp., Tacoma, Washington, and subsequently scrapped.

== Awards ==
Wilhoite received the Presidential Unit Citation, a Navy Unit Commendation, and one battle star for World War II service and six battle stars for her duty in Vietnam.
