= USS Willis =

1943 Edsall-class destroyer escort

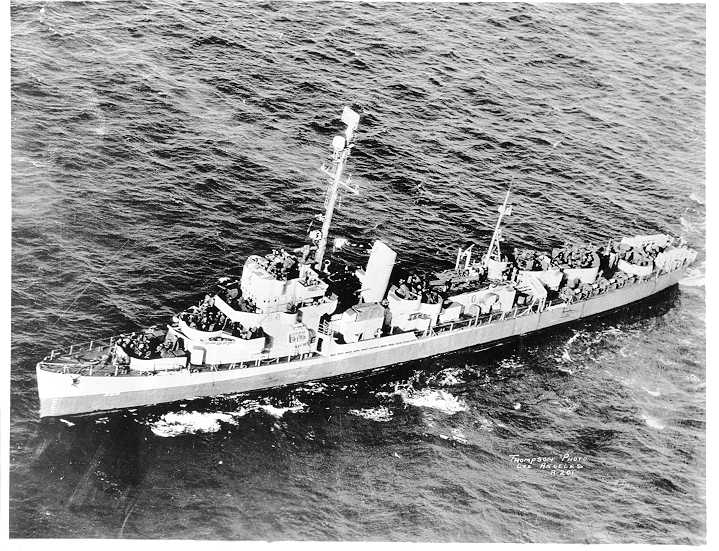

History

United States
- Namesake: Walter Michael Willis
- Builder: Brown Shipbuilding, Houston, Texas
- Laid down: 17 July 1943
- Launched: 14 September 1943
- Commissioned: 10 December 1943
- Decommissioned: 14 June 1946
- Stricken: 1 July 1972
- Fate: Sold and scrapped in 1972

General characteristics
- Class & type: Edsall-class destroyer escort
- Displacement: 1,253 tons standard; 1,590 tons full load
- Length: 306 feet (93.27 m)
- Beam: 36.58 feet (11.15 m)
- Draft: 10.42 full load feet (3.18 m)
- Propulsion: 4 FM diesel engines, 4 diesel-generators, 6,000 shp (4.5 MW), 2 screws
- Speed: 21 knots (39 km/h)
- Range: 9,100 nmi. at 12 knots; (17,000 km at 22 km/h)
- Complement: 8 officers, 201 enlisted
- Armament: 3 × single 3 in (76 mm)/50 guns; 1 × twin 40 mm AA guns; 8 × single 20 mm AA guns; 1 × triple 21 in (533 mm) torpedo tubes; 8 × depth charge projectors; 1 × depth charge projector (hedgehog); 2 × depth charge tracks

USS Willis (DE–395) was an Edsall-class destroyer escort of the United States Navy.

== Namesake ==
Walter Michael Willis was born on 14 January 1917 at Minneapolis, Minnesota. He enlisted in the United States Naval Reserve as a seaman 2nd class at Minneapolis. He received an appointment as reserve aviation cadet on 22 December 1939. Six days later, he reported to Pensacola Naval Air Station for flight instruction and, on 14 August 1940, emerged with his aviator's wings.

Commissioned an ensign on 10 September, he joined Bombing Squadron 6 (VB-6, based on the USS Enterprise (CV-6) and flew Douglas SBD Dauntless dive bombers until early in December 1941. On the morning of 7 December, as Enterprise was returning from Wake Island to Hawaii, the carrier sent up a flight of SBD's to scout the water ahead. Willis took off in one of these bombers for what was intended to be a routine flight to Ford Island, the naval air station at Pearl Harbor. However they arrived almost simultaneously with the start of the Japanese Attack on Pearl Harbor. In the ensuing aerial melee, Willis and his gunner were among the Americans shot down. An eye-witness account from Norman Kleiss describes an argument in the Enterprise ready room three days earlier between Willis, who had unusually good vision, and another officer, with Willis insisting he had sighted ships during a just-completed patrol flight; the other officer stopped Willis from reporting the sighting to then-VADM William Halsey Jr.

== Operational history ==
Willis (DE-395) was laid down on 17 July 1943 at Houston, Texas, by Brown Shipbuilding Co.; launched on 14 September 1943, sponsored by Mrs. Marie E. Willis, the mother of the late Ens. Willis; and commissioned on 10 December 1943. Leaving the shipyard, Willis's steering gear failed, and she ran aground almost immediately in the shipyard channel.

After fitting out at Houston and loading ammunition at the San Jacinto Ordnance Depot, Willis departed Galveston, Texas, on 5 January 1944 in company with USS Kretchmer (DE-329) bound for the British West Indies and reached Bermuda on the 10th.

Following shakedown, Willis departed Bermuda on 3 February—in company with Kretchmer and USS Thomason (DE-203)—and arrived at Charleston, South Carolina, on the 6th. The destroyer escort underwent post-shakedown availability in the navy yard there over the ensuing week and sailed on 15 February for the Chesapeake Bay, escorting the merchantman SS Exanthia to Hampton Roads where she arrived the next day.

Two days later, Willis proceeded—in company with USS Stewart (DE-238)—to Staten Island, New York, and, upon arrival, reported for duty to commander, Escort Division (CortDiv) 51. Subsequently, Willis joined Task Group (TG) 21.11 at Hampton Roads on 26 February, the hunter-killer group formed around the escort carrier USS Bogue (CVE-9).

=== Convoy duty ===
That day, the task group put to sea for operations in the Central Atlantic that took its ships first to Casablanca—visited from 18 to 22 March—and then to the British West Indies in mid-April. Besides Bogue and Willis, the group was composed of USS Haverfield (DE-393), USS Swenning (DE-394), USS Janssen (DE-396), and USS Hobson (DD-464). They scored their first success on 13 March when Hobson teamed with Haverfield, planes from Bogue's Composite Squadron (VC) 95, HMCS Prince Rupert, and British aircraft to sink U-575.

Willis continued to operate in Bogue's screen into the summer, calling at Casablanca for a second time from 29 May to 2 June, before TG 22.2 moved to Bermuda. On 24 June, 800 miles (1,300 km) southwest of the Azores, TG 22.2 destroyed another Axis submersible when planes of Bogue's VC-69 sank the Japanese submarine I-52. The task group completed that stint of hunter-killer operations on 30 June when it arrived at Port Royal Bay, Bermuda. Willis departed Bermuda on 1 July and proceeded to Hampton Roads, where TG 22.2 was dissolved upon its arrival there on the 3rd.

The destroyer escort then underwent repairs at Bayonne, New Jersey, from 4 to 14 July, after which time she joined CortDiv 51 for a period of refresher training out of Casco Bay, Maine. Proceeding back to Hampton Roads upon completion of those training evolutions, Willis moored at the Naval Operating Base (NOB), Norfolk, Va., on 22 July.

The next day, the destroyer escort sailed for Bermuda, again as a unit of TG 22.3 and screening Bogue. Other ships in the escort carrier's screen included Haverfield (with Commander, CortDiv 51 embarked) Swenning, Janssen, and USS Wilhoite (DE-397). The group conducted antisubmarine warfare (ASW) training exercises and gunnery drills en route to Bermuda and arrived there on 29 July.

Bogue and her escorts resumed hunter-killer operations on 2 August. Four days later, Willis obtained a sonar contact at 13:53 and fired a full "hedgehog" pattern which produced no positive results. A little over a week later, the ship participated in a futile search for a lost plane from Bogue.

Four days later, however, Bogue's planes scored again: aircraft from VC-42 found and destroyed U-1229. Willis arrived on the scene in time to take part in the search for possible survivors. She recovered three bodies and obtained oil samples from the extensive slick covering the waters in the area. Soon after, the search for survivors was discontinued at 17:30, she rejoined Bogue's screen.

Four days later, TG 22.3 reached the Naval Air Base at Argentia, Newfoundland, for a brief period of in-port upkeep. The group subsequently resumed hunter-killer operations soon thereafter; and, during the ensuing patrols, Willis obtained a sonar contact at 11:47 on 14 September. She fired a pattern of "hedgehogs" and made two depth charge runs before she laid a sonobuoy pattern. Swenning joined the search at 16:00, and the two destroyer escorts made a coordinated attack. Willis and her sistership then combed the area thoroughly throughout the night but finally gave up the hunt at 19:06 the following day.

The next day, Willis contacted a lost carrier plane and vectored her back to her ship. The radio operator on duty in Willis was subsequently commended for his action that enabled a lost aircraft and her crew to reach home safely.

Willis arrived at the New York Navy Yard on 25 September for repairs and got underway again on 7 October, bound for New London, Conn., in company with most of CortDiv 51. The destroyer escorts conducted ASW exercises out of New London for a week before they moved to Norfolk; whence, on 23 October they joined TG 22.3 and headed for Bermuda, their base for gunnery and ASW exercises from 25 October to 20 November.

Willis proceeded back to New York for an emergency availability period late in November, reaching the navy yard there on the 25th. Shortly before she left the yard to shift to Pier 92, New York, on 28 November 1944, the ship received the Presidential Unit Citation "for outstanding performance in combat as an escort vessel in two task groups with USS Bogue during the periods: 26 February to 19 April 1944, and 4 May to 3 July 1944."

The destroyer escort sailed on 4 December for ASW operations with TG 22.3, again formed around the now famous Bogue. In ensuing days, the group operated off the northeastern seaboard, running into rough weather over a week after their departure from New York. At 10:30 on 13 December, the wheelhouse inclinometer in Willis registered one roll of 62 degrees. The ships did not experience good hunting but investigated numerous sonar and radar contacts with negative results. On 16 December, Willis moored at the convoy escort piers, Norfolk, where she remained through Christmas.

Underway for the British West Indies on 26 December, Willis and the rest of TG 22.3 operated out of Bermuda, conducting ASW exercises from 28 December 1944 to 14 January 1945 before heading north and touching at New York City en route to Casco Bay for gunnery and ASW maneuvers. Willis planeguarded for Bogue in the carrier qualification areas off Quonset Point and Narragansett Bay before the destroyer escort put into the New York Navy Yard for availability. She returned north upon completion of those repairs and alterations and resumed her training out of Casco Bay.

After another brief, unscheduled availability—this time at the Boston Navy Yard—Willis again resumed training in Casco Bay before she shifted south to conduct ASW exercises out of New London. At the end of March, she became part of Task Unit (TU) 22.3.1 to conduct further training exercises before joining TG 22.14 on the last day of the month.

For most of the first week of April, Willis carried out a scouting patrol well off the eastern seaboard before proceeding to Hampton Roads, arriving at Norfolk on 8 April. Underway again two days later, the destroyer escort shifted north, honing her ASW skills in exercises conducted in company with Bogue off the coast of Rhode Island, putting into Melville, R.I., in mid-April.

On 16 April, Willis cleared Melville as part of TG 22.3 to conduct hunter-killer operations—known as Operation "Teardrop"—on "barrier patrol" to prevent the penetration of U-boats to the east coast of the United States. Four days out of Melville, TG 22.3 rendezvoused with TG 22.4. At 08:40 on 24 April, U-546 torpedoed and sank USS Frederick C. Davis (DE-136), one of the other escort destroyers in combined screen. A search immediately began; and a covey of escorts flushed out the enemy submersible and sank her in a determined attack.

Three days later, Willis picked up a sonar contact and decided that it was "a possible enemy submarine." The destroyer escort fired a "hedgehog" pattern and was soon joined by USS Cockrill (DE-398), who likewise fired her "hedgehogs" at 21:38. Both ships then began a retiring search in which they were soon joined by Swenning and Janssen.

At 00:40 the next day, 28 April, USS Hayter (DE-212), USS Hubbard (DE-211), and USS Otter (DE-210) joined forces with the four escorts already searching the area, but none of the ships achieved positive results. On 30 April Willis, in company with Swenning, TU 22.7.1 and TG 22.8, left the screen of the task group to investigate a disappearing radar contact reported by aircraft from USS Core (CVE-13).

Rejoining TG 22.3 on 1 May, Willis suffered minor storm damage when a heavy wave tore loose her number 1 gun shield, ripping a 4-inch (100 mm) hole in the deck; but a damage control party patched the tear as the ship proceeded independently to Bayonne, New Jersey, for permanent repairs. While the destroyer escort was there, Germany surrendered at Reims, France, on 7 May, ending the war in Europe.

Upon completion of the repairs, Willis—now earmarked for service in the Pacific, a theater of war—underwent a month-long availability at the Norfolk Navy Yard before sailing for Guantanamo Bay, Cuba to conduct refresher training. From 2 to 15 July, the ship carried out those evolutions, after which time she sailed in company with most of the ships in CortDiv 7 for the Canal Zone.

=== Transfer to the Pacific ===
Transiting the Panama Canal between 17 and 19 July, Willis reached San Diego, Calif., on 26 July and pushed on toward Hawaii at the end of the month. She arrived at Pearl Harbor on 7 August and reported for duty to the Commander, Destroyers, Pacific Fleet. For Willis, however, there were to be no more active combat operations—because a week later, Japan—reeling under the unexpected power of a pair of atomic bombs—capitulated. World War II was over.

=== Post war activity ===
Willis trained in the Hawaiian Islands until 20 August and then departed Pearl Harbor, bound for the Marianas as part of TU 12.5.1. She reached Saipan on 30 August but got underway again the next day, escorting USS Wharton (AP-7) to the Marshalls. The ships reached Eniwetok Atoll on 3 September.

Willis subsequently escorted the attack transport USS Lycoming (APA-155) to Saipan between 6 and 9 September and, on 13 September, proceeded from Saipan to Guam, reporting for duty upon arrival to Commander, Submarines, Pacific Fleet. She remained on operations out of Guam, probably as a target vessel for submarines, through the end of the year. She ultimately departed Apra Harbor, Guam, on 10 January, bound for home.

Reaching San Pedro on 28 January, via Pearl Harbor, Willis transited the Panama Canal on 19 and 20 February and reached Houston on the 26th. From there, she pushed on to Green Cove Springs, Fla. Decommissioned on 14 June 1946, Willis was placed in reserve and berthed at Mayport, Fla.

== Reserve status, decommissioning, and final status ==
Willis remained inactive for the next decade in Florida waters until transferred to the Philadelphia group of the Reserve Fleet on 29 August 1957. She remained there into the 1970s. Never modernized, Willis was considered "unessential to the defense of the United States" by mid-1972; and, on 1 July of that year, her name was struck from the Navy list. She was stripped and, on 17 August 1973, was sold to Edward O. Sanchez, of New Bedford, Mass., and scrapped.

== Awards and citations ==
Willis was awarded one battle star for her World War II service and three Presidential Unit Citations for her work with Bogue in the Battle of the Atlantic.
