= USS Robert I. Paine =

Buckley-class destroyer escort

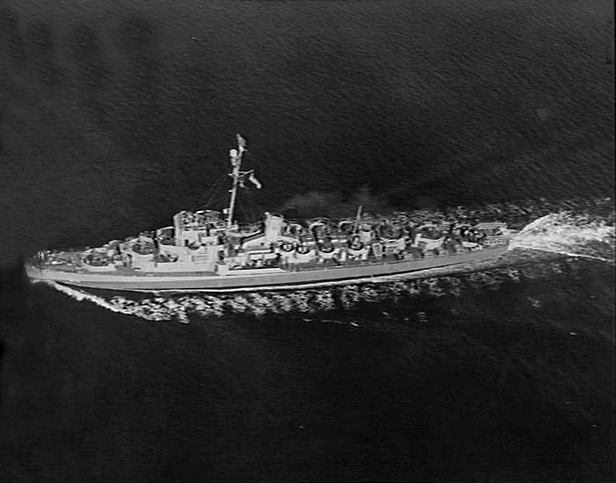

History

United States
- Name: USS Robert I. Paine
- Namesake: Pvt. Robert I. Paine, USMC
- Ordered: 1942
- Builder: Bethlehem Hingham Shipyard
- Laid down: 5 November 1943
- Launched: 30 December 1943
- Commissioned: 26 February 1944
- Decommissioned: 21 November 1947
- Reclassified: DER-578, 18 March 1949; DE-578, 1 December 1954
- Stricken: 1 June 1968
- Honors and awards: 1 battle star (World War II)
- Fate: Sold for scrap, 18 July 1969

General characteristics
- Class & type: Buckley-class destroyer escort
- Displacement: 1,400 long tons (1,422 t) standard; 1,740 long tons (1,768 t) full load
- Length: 306 ft (93 m)
- Beam: 37 ft (11 m)
- Draft: 9 ft 6 in (2.90 m) standard; 11 ft 3 in (3.43 m) full load
- Propulsion: 2 × boilers; General Electric turbo-electric drive; 12,000 shp (8.9 MW); 2 × solid manganese-bronze 3,600 lb (1,600 kg) 3-bladed propellers, 8 ft 6 in (2.59 m) diameter, 7 ft 7 in (2.31 m) pitch; 2 × rudders; 359 tons fuel oil
- Speed: 23 knots (43 km/h; 26 mph)
- Range: 3,700 nmi (6,900 km) at 15 kn (28 km/h; 17 mph); 6,000 nmi (11,000 km) at 12 kn (22 km/h; 14 mph)
- Complement: 15 officers, 198 men
- Armament: 3 × 3"/50 caliber guns; 1 × quad 1.1"/75 caliber gun; 8 × single 20 mm guns; 1 × triple 21 inch (533 mm) torpedo tubes; 1 × Hedgehog anti-submarine mortar; 8 × K-gun depth charge projectors; 2 × depth charge tracks

USS Robert I. Paine (DE/DER-578), a Buckley-class destroyer escort of the United States Navy, was named in honor of Marine Corps Private Robert I. Paine (1923–1942), who was killed in action during the attack on Tulagi on 7 August 1942. He was posthumously awarded the Silver Star.

Robert I. Paine was laid down at the Bethlehem Hingham Shipyards, Hingham, Massachusetts, on 5 November 1943; launched on 30 December 1943; sponsored by Mrs. John Paine, mother of Private Paine; and commissioned on 26 February 1944.

== Service history ==
=== Atlantic Fleet, 1944–1945 ===
Robert I. Paine completed shakedown off Bermuda in mid-April 1944 and joined the Atlantic Fleet on the 24th. She departed Brooklyn the same day to screen the carriers Ranger (CV-4) and Card (CVE-11) as they transported Army aircraft and Allied personnel to Casablanca. Arriving on 4 May, the destroyer escort patrolled off Casablanca until the 7th; then put to sea for the return voyage.

Detached on the 10th, she joined a hunter-killer group centered on the escort carrier Block Island (CVE-21) on the 15th. On the 18th, the group returned to Casablanca, replenished and sortied again on the 23rd for another anti-submarine sweep west of the Canary Islands and south of the Azores. On the 29th, Block Island was sunk and Barr (DE-576) was struck in the stern. Both were victims of torpedoes from U-549. The remaining escorts commenced rescue and search operations, with Robert I. Paine taking on 279 survivors from the CVE, then moving in to cover the crippled DE. Another escort, Eugene E. Elmore (DE-686), made contact with the U-boat, and assisted by Ahrens (DE-575), sank her. The search for survivors was called off the next day and the force retired to Casablanca. On 4 June, Robert I. Paine steamed for Gibraltar. Off Europa Point she rendezvoused with GUF-11 and, as a unit of TF 68, escorted the convoy to New York, arriving on the 14th.

Anti-submarine warfare training in Casco Bay followed, and on 12 July she anchored in Hampton Roads to await the sailing of UGS-48, a slow convoy to Bizerte. Underway on the 13th, her radar picked up enemy aircraft shadowing the convoy on the 31st, and she assisted in beating off a Luftwaffe attack on 1 August. At Boston again at the end of the month, she completed another escort run to Bizerte and back in early November; then, after further training, resumed anti-submarine activities, this time ranging between Casco Bay, Halifax, Nova Scotia and NS Argentia, Newfoundland.

=== Twelfth Fleet, 1945 ===
In February 1945, she shifted to escort work off the southern New England coast and in early March she headed east to join the 12th Fleet for patrol work under the Royal Navy's Western Approaches Command. She arrived at Liverpool on 3 April, and for the remainder of the European War Robert I. Paine guarded convoys on the first or last section of the transatlantic convoy lanes. On 14 May, Robert I. Paine represented the United States at surrender ceremonies of eight U-boats at Lisahally, County Londonderry; then, after a brief return to Liverpool, got underway for the United States.

=== Post-war activities, 1946–1947 ===
On 1 June the destroyer escort arrived at New York, whence she continued on to Houston, Texas and conversion to a radar picket ship. In January 1946, she trained in the Caribbean, then sailed north for exercises off Maine. Back at Norfolk in March, she sailed on the 10th for the Azores and duty as intermediate air-sea rescue ship based at Ponta Delgada. In May she returned to the United States and was laid up for four months because of lack of personnel. In the fall she underwent overhaul and in January 1947 resumed operations along the east Coast and in the Caribbean.

=== Decommissioned and in reserve, 1947–1969 ===
Ordered to join the Reserve Fleet in June 1947, she arrived at Charleston, South Carolina on 4 September, decommissioned on 21 November, and was berthed with the Charleston Group, Atlantic Reserve Fleet where she remained until struck from the Navy List on 1 June 1968. During that time she was re-designated twice; to DER-578 on 18 March 1949; and to DE-578 on 1 December 1954. Robert I. Paine was sold on 18 July 1969 and broken up for scrap.

== Awards ==
Robert I. Paine earned one battle star during World War II.
