= USS Varian =

Buckley-class destroyer escort

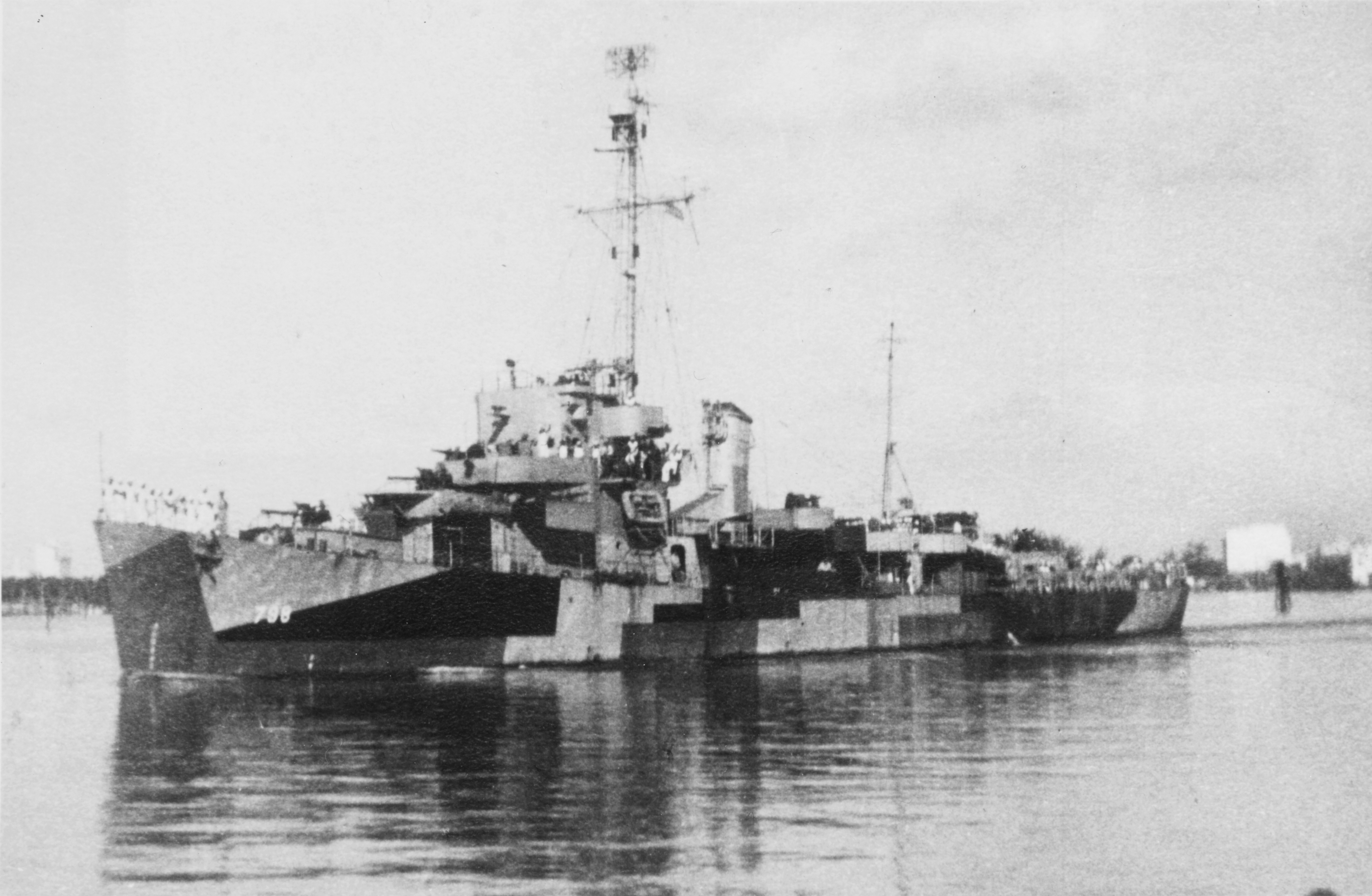
- USS Varian (DE-798), while operating out of Miami, Florida, summer 1945.

History

United States
- Laid down: 27 August 1943
- Launched: 6 November 1943
- Commissioned: 29 February 1944
- Decommissioned: 15 March 1946
- Stricken: 1 December 1972
- Fate: Sold for scrap, 12 January 1974

General characteristics
- Displacement: 1,740 tons full; 1,400 tons, standard
- Length: 306 ft (93 m)
- Beam: 36 ft 10 in (11.23 m)
- Draft: 13 ft 6 in (4.11 m), maximum
- Propulsion: GE turbo-electric drive, 12,000 hp (8.9 MW); two propellers
- Speed: 24 knots (44 km/h)
- Range: 4,940 nautical miles at 12 knots; (9,200 km at 22 km/h)
- Complement: 15 officers, 198 men
- Armament: 3 × 3 in (76 mm) DP guns, 3 × 21 in (53 cm) torpedo tubes, 1 × 1.1 in (28 mm) quad AA gun, 8 × 20 mm cannon, 1 × hedgehog projector, 2 × depth charge tracks, 8 × K-gun depth charge projectors

USS Varian (DE-798) was a Buckley-class destroyer escort of the United States Navy.

== Construction and commissioning ==
Varian was laid down on 27 August 1943 at Orange, Texas, by the Consolidated Steel Corp., named after Bertram Varian, Jr. who was a naval aviator killed during the Battle of Midway in June 1942. The ship was launched on 6 November 1943; sponsored by Mrs. Arnold F. Brunkow, sister of the late Ens. Varian; and commissioned on 29 February 1944.

== History ==
After fitting out, Varian conducted her shakedown cruise out of Bermuda for the last half of the month of March 1944. She then joined the homeward-bound ships of Convoy GUS-33 on 30 March and helped to escort them to Hampton Roads, Virginia. Following repairs at Boston and further training out of Casco Bay, Varian shifted south and rendezvoused with Mediterranean-bound Convoy UGS-44 on 2 June. After subsequently shepherding GUS-44 from Bizerte to Hampton Roads, the destroyer escort arrived at New York on 18 July. She then conducted two more round-trip convoy missions, with UGS/GUS-51 from mid-August to mid-September and with UGS/GUS-58 until mid-November, before she was assigned to the first "hunter-killer" group – formed on 30 November 1944 to track down and destroy enemy submarines.

Varian and her sisters accordingly underwent intensive training for 26 days. They received special instruction, principally in high-frequency direction finding and gunnery; and spent 60 hours perfecting unit tactics for coordinated attacks on maneuvering submarines. Before they put to sea, Escort Division 62 – grouped as Task Unit 27.1.1 (TU 27.1.1) and led by Cmdr. Jack F. Bowling in Otter (DE-210) — practiced every type of known antisubmarine warfare attack, rehearsing them in simulated operating conditions.

In less than a month after TU 27.1.1's departure from Casco Bay on the day after Christmas of 1944, the new unit proved the "hunter-killer" concept valid. On the morning of 16 January 1945, Otter, Varian, Hayter (DE-212), and Hubbard (DE-211) hunted down U-248 and sank her after a dogged two-hour hunt, 500 nautical miles (930 km; 580 mi) north of the Azores, at 47°43′N 26°37′W. A little over three months later, on 24 April, Varian and nine other DEs tracked down the U-boat that had recently torpedoed Frederick C. Davis (DE-136). The 10 American DEs avenged their sister's loss with a punishing depth charge barrage that forced U-546 to the surface, where the DEs then destroyed her with gunfire, at 43°53′N 40°07′W. Varian picked up nine survivors.

The end of the war in Europe on 7 May 1945 saw many of Germany's U-boat fleet still at sea. On 12 May, Varian rendezvoused with one of these, U-805, and a party from the destroyer escort, led by Lt. (jg.) Earle D. Stevenson, USNR, boarded the submarine and brought her to the east coast.

Following upkeep at the Boston Navy Yard, Varian got underway on 23 May and proceeded via New York to Hampton Roads. Shifting to Miami, Florida, soon thereafter, the destroyer escort operated in a training role, providing practical experience for newly commissioned officers until 16 July. The next day, earmarked for conversion to a radar picket ship, Varian arrived at Charleston, S.C. for availability. However, her conversion was cancelled, and the ship soon resumed training operations in the Caribbean.

On 2 September, the ship departed Culebra, Puerto Rico, and she steamed north to New London, Conn., for training duty with Atlantic Fleet submarines. At New Haven, Connecticut, for Navy Day festivities, Varian subsequently sailed south for inactivation at Green Cove Springs near Jacksonville, Florida. Arriving there, via Boston, on 27 November, Varian was decommissioned on 15 March 1946 and placed in reserve. She was later shifted to the Texas group of the Reserve Fleet at Orange. There, she remained through the 1960s. Struck from the Navy list on 1 December 1972, Varian was sold on 12 January 1974 to the Southern Scrap Metal Co., Ltd., of New Orleans, for scrapping. Towed by three tugs, the erstwhile U-boat killer began her final voyage on 31 January.

Varian received two battle stars for her World War II service.
