= USS Barr =

WWII U.S. naval vessel

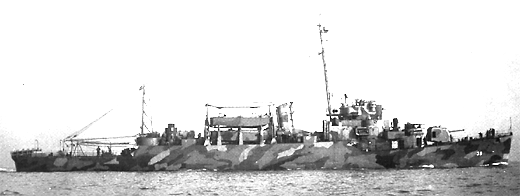
- USS Barr (APD-39) shown after conversion to Auxiliary High Speed Transport

History

United States
- Name: USS Barr
- Namesake: Woodrow Wilson Barr
- Builder: Bethlehem Hingham Shipyard
- Laid down: 4 November 1943
- Launched: 28 December 1943
- Commissioned: 16 February 1944
- Decommissioned: 12 July 1946
- Reclassified: APD-39, 23 October 1944
- Stricken: 1 June 1960
- Honors and awards: 3 battle stars (World War II)
- Fate: Sunk as a target off Puerto Rico, 23 March 1963

General characteristics
- Class & type: Buckley-class destroyer escort
- Displacement: 1,400 long tons (1,422 t) standard; 1,740 long tons (1,768 t) full load
- Length: 306 ft (93 m)
- Beam: 37 ft (11 m)
- Draft: 9 ft 6 in (2.90 m) standard; 11 ft 3 in (3.43 m) full load
- Propulsion: 2 × boilers; General Electric turbo-electric drive; 12,000 shp (8.9 MW); 2 × solid manganese-bronze 3,600 lb (1,600 kg) 3-bladed propellers, 8 ft 6 in (2.59 m) diameter, 7 ft 7 in (2.31 m) pitch; 2 × rudders; 359 tons fuel oil
- Speed: 23 knots (43 km/h; 26 mph)
- Range: 3,700 nmi (6,900 km) at 15 kn (28 km/h; 17 mph); 6,000 nmi (11,000 km) at 12 kn (22 km/h; 14 mph)
- Complement: 15 officers, 198 men
- Armament: 3 × 3-inch/50-caliber guns; 1 × quad 1.1-inch/75-caliber gun; 8 × single 20 mm guns; 1 × triple 21 inch (533 mm) torpedo tubes; 1 × Hedgehog anti-submarine mortar; 8 × K-gun depth charge projectors; 2 × depth charge tracks

USS Barr (DE-576/APD-39), originally a Buckley-class destroyer escort, and later a Charles Lawrence-class fast transport of the United States Navy named for Pvt. Woodrow Wilson Barr of Keyser, West Virginia.

Barr was laid down on 5 November 1943 at Hingham, Massachusetts, by the Bethlehem Shipbuilding Co., named for Woodrow Wilson Barr, a marine private killed during the recapture of Tulagi. The ship was launched on 28 December 1943; sponsored by Mrs. Cora Dell Barr, Pfc. Barr's mother; and commissioned on 16 February 1944.

== Service history ==
=== Atlantic, 1944 ===
Following shakedown off Bermuda and escort training at Casco Bay, Maine, the destroyer escort reported to Norfolk for anti-submarine duty in the Atlantic off the Cape Verde Islands. She operated as part of a hunter-killer group built around the escort carrier Block Island (CVE-21) and also composed of Ahrens (DE-575), Eugene E. Elmore (DE-686), and Buckley (DE-51). Throughout May, this task group followed up submarine reports, chasing down sonar contacts that usually proved to be fish or debris. On 6 May, Buckley rammed and sank an enemy submarine, verifying that the waters of the South Atlantic did hide enemy submarines.

On 29 May, while closing a reported submarine, Block Island suffered a torpedo hit. Barr pursued the U-boat, later identified as U-549, until around 2030 when a torpedo struck Barr as well. The explosion wrecked the ship aft of the No. 2 engine room, killing four of her crew, injuring 14, and leaving 12 missing. Throughout the night, Barr stayed dead in the water while Robert I. Paine (DE-578) patrolled around her. Eugene E. Elmore took Barr's injured and about half of her crew on board, hooked up a towline to the damaged escort and began the journey to Casablanca, French Morocco. Wilhoite (DE-397) relieved Eugene E. Elmore; and the Dutch tug, Antic took over and finally towed Barr into port six days later.

Barr stayed in drydock at Casablanca until 2 July while the wreckage of her damaged stern was burned off, spaces cleared of oil and debris, and stern plates welded on for the trip home. On 3 July, Cherokee (ATF-66) began the long voyage to Boston with Barr in tow. After a brief stop in Bermuda to avoid a major tropical storm, the ships arrived at the Boston Navy Yard on 25 July.

The destroyer escort spent the next three months in drydock being refurbished and converted to a high speed transport. Redesignated APD-39 on 23 October, Barr sailed for Norfolk on 3 November for boat training, and departed that port on the 15th as escort for Teton (AGC-14). After transiting the Panama Canal and stopping in San Francisco to load more cargo, she and Cecil (APA-96) sailed westward and arrived at Pearl Harbor on 9 December.

=== Pacific fleet, 1945 ===
In Hawaii, Barr shuttled between Pearl Harbor and Maui, where she trained with Underwater Demolition Teams (UDTs) for night and day demolitions and shore bombardment. On 10 January 1945, Barr set sail for Ulithi, the main staging area for the invasion of Iwo Jima. From late January to early February, the fast transport loaded supplies, made repairs, and took part in demolition and reconnaissance training on reefs east of Ulithi. On 10 February, Barr and the other APDs stood out of the lagoon at Ulithi with the Iwo Jima invasion force. The transports rehearsed D-Day movements at Tinian on the 12th and 13th. Then, the advance group headed for Iwo Jima on the 14th. Barr arrived off the southern end of the island on 16 February; and, that afternoon, her embarked UDT 13 successfully completed its first mission. The team placed a navigational light on the hazardous Higashi Rocks despite coming under enemy fire. Barr, however, solved the problem, silencing that gunfire with some of her own.

The next morning, following intense shelling by fire support ships and aircraft, the fast transports approached the eastern beaches for reconnaissance by the UDTs. During the afternoon, they made a reconnaissance of the western beaches in the same manner. On 18 February, Barr received orders to land her UDT on the Higashi Rocks again to reposition the light before retiring for the night. As she and Blessman (APD-48) pulled away from the island, a Japanese bomber flew over Barr, crashed Blessman, and caused many casualties.

Barr spent D-Day, 19 February, in transport areas about 6,000 yards (5,000 m) off the eastern beaches. Her boats, manned by UDT frogmen, assisted in guiding marines to the landing beaches. Then, until 3 March, the high speed transport took screening station at night and anchored during the day while UDTs worked with the beachmasters to remove underwater obstacles. On 4 March, Barr departed Iwo Jima and steamed via Saipan and Guam to Ulithi where she anchored on 12 March.

For the next week, the fast transport prepared for the invasion of Okinawa. On the 21st, she stood out of Ulithi as part of the Gun Fire and Covering Force under Rear Admiral Morton L. Deyo. The warships arrived off Okinawa on 25 March and approached Kerama Retto to reconnoiter the southwestern tip of Tokashiki. During the next four days, Barr put UDT 13 ashore on Keise Shima, a group of small sand and coral islands between Kerama Retto and Okinawa, to gather information and blast passages through the reef for the LSTs.

The Japanese maintained an almost constant aerial onslaught in the early days of the invasion. Barr did not close Okinawa on D-Day, 1 April, but remained in the transport area as a part of the anti-submarine screen. She transferred UDT 13 to Wayne (APA-54) on 6 and 7 April and continued screening until 9 April, when she sailed to Saipan for a week of repairs.

Barr got underway again on 23 April to escort a convoy of LSTs and LSMs back to Okinawa. The fast transport remained off the Hagushi anchorage providing anti-air and anti-submarine defense until 27 May, when she headed for Saipan as a convoy escort. Leaving the convoy at Saipan, Barr continued on to the Philippines, visiting Leyte and Manila before joining the screen of an Okinawa-bound convoy at Lingayen Gulf. The fast transport resumed screening duties at Okinawa after her return late in June.

=== Post-war activities ===
After Japan capitulated on 15 August, Barr rendezvoused with HMS King George V and HMS Gambia east of Tokyo, embarked Royal Marines from the two British warships and landed them at Yokosuka. After this mission, she proceeded to the north end of the bay to evacuate Allied prisoners of war from central Honshū. During several trips, the fast transport received on board 1,135 former POWs. After the evacuation was completed, Barr made one mail run to Iwo Jima between 24 and 28 September and then remained in port at Tokyo until 12 October, when she was ordered to Nagasaki for duty with the U.S. Strategic Bombing Survey. She served there as a base of operations and as a barracks ship until 1 December when she began the voyage to the United States.

=== Decommissioned and in reserve ===
The transport arrived at San Diego on 19 December and, after voyage repairs, continued on to the east coast where she was placed out of commission, in reserve, at Green Cove Springs, Florida, on 12 July 1946. Barr remained in the Atlantic Reserve Fleet until the early 1960s. Her name was struck from the Navy List on 1 June 1960, and she was sunk as a target off Vieques Island on 26 March 1963.

== Awards ==
Barr received three battle stars for her World War II service.
