= Operation Cosmos =

Non-combat military operation

Operation Cosmos provided navigational aids for, and was prepared to render emergency assistance to, U.S. President Dwight D. Eisenhower's plane as the Chief Executive crossed the Pacific Ocean on a good will tour in 1960.

== Example of use ==
- USS Haverfield (DE-393)
