= Edward H. Ahrens =

United States Marine (1919–1942)

Edward Henry Ahrens
- Born: November 4, 1919; Dayton, Kentucky, U.S.
- Died: August 8, 1942 (aged 22); DOW at Guadalcanal
- Military career
- Allegiance: United States
- Branch: United States Marine Corps
- Rank: Private First Class
- Service number: 358161
- Unit: 1st Raider Battalion
- Conflicts: World War II; *Battle of Guadalcanal
- Awards: Navy Cross

Private First Class Edward Henry Ahrens (November 4, 1919 – August 8, 1942) served in the Marine Raiders in the Battle of Guadalcanal.

== Biography ==
Ahrens was born on Nov. 4, 1919, in Dayton, Kentucky. He enlisted in the United States Marine Corps on February 3, 1942, in Cincinnati, Ohio, and underwent boot camp training at the Marine Corps Recruit Depot Parris Island, South Carolina. He transferred to the Marine Barracks Quantico, Virginia on March 16, 1942.

Assigned to Company "A", 1st Raider Battalion, Fleet Marine Force, soon thereafter, Ahrens landed with that unit from USS Little (APD-4) at Tulagi, Guadalcanal, British Solomon Islands, in the second assault wave on August 7, 1942. With Company "C", 1st Raider Battalion, securing the right flank on the beachhead, Company "A" moved inland and down the right slope of Tulagi's central ridge. Initially, the Marines were not opposed.

That evening, Company "A" took positions for the night west of a cricket ground on the island, as part of the defensive line extending along the ridge. The Japanese later launched a fierce nocturnal counterattack which drove a wedge between the two Raider companies. Isolating the latter near the beachhead, the enemy concentrated their efforts on Company "A" in an attempt to sweep up the ridge toward the residency, a former British government building serving as a Raider battalion command post. The Raiders, however, stood firm.

During the savage battle that ensued, Ahrens, in a security detachment assigned the task of protecting the Raiders' right flank, singlehandedly engaged a group of Japanese in hand-to-hand combat as they attempted to infiltrate the Raiders' rear. He was found the next morning, mortally wounded, with 13 dead Japanese soldiers around his position. In his Navy Cross citation, he was credited with killing at least three Japanese, including the attacking unit's senior officer, and aiding materially in stopping their infiltration.

His last words, to his commanding officer, were reported to be "The bastards tried to come over me last night-I guess they didn't know I was a Marine." Ahrens, twenty-two, unmarried, from Dayton, Kentucky, died in the arms of (then Major) Lewis William Walt.

== Awards and decorations ==
For his part in stopping the enemy, was posthumously awarded a Navy Cross.

=== Citation ===
The President of the United States takes pride in presenting the Navy Cross (Posthumously) to Edward Henry Ahrens (358161), Private First Class, U.S. Marine Corps (Reserve), for extraordinary heroism and devotion to duty while serving with Company A, FIRST Marine Raider Battalion, during the landing assault and seizure of enemy Japanese-held Tulagi Island, British Solomon Islands, on the night of 7–8 August 1942. While a member of a security detachment protecting the right flank of his battalion, Private First Class Ahrens, with utter disregard for his own personal safety, single-handed engaged in hand-to-hand combat a group of the enemy attempting to infiltrate the rear of the battalion. Although mortally wounded, he succeeded in killing the officer in command of the hostile unit and two other Japanese, thereby breaking up the attack. His great personal valor and indomitable fighting spirit were in keeping with the highest traditions of the United States Naval Service. He gallantly gave his life in the defense of his country.

== Namesake ==
In 1943, the destroyer escort USS Ahrens (DE-575) was named in his honor.
