= USS Ahrens =

Buckley-class destroyer escort

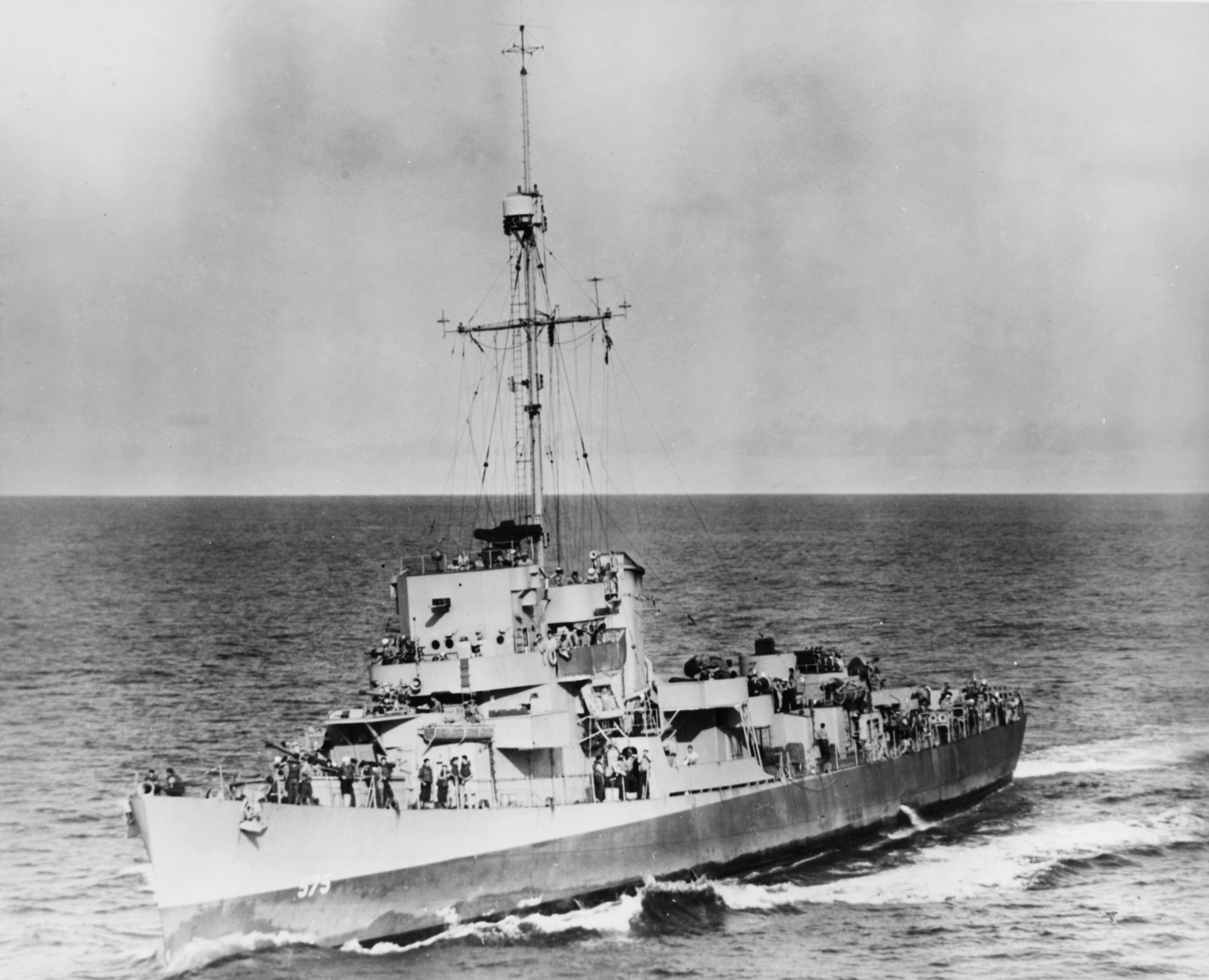
- USS Ahrens (DE-575) in the Atlantic Ocean

History

United States
- Name: USS Ahrens
- Namesake: Edward H. Ahrens
- Ordered: 1942
- Builder: Bethlehem Steel Corporation, Hingham, Massachusetts
- Laid down: 5 November 1943
- Launched: 21 December 1943
- Commissioned: 12 February 1944
- Decommissioned: 24 June 1946
- Stricken: 1 April 1965
- Honors and awards: 2 battle stars (World War II)
- Fate: Sold for scrap, 20 January 1967

General characteristics
- Class & type: Buckley-class destroyer escort
- Displacement: 1,400 long tons (1,422 t) standard; 1,740 long tons (1,768 t) full load
- Length: 306 ft (93 m)
- Beam: 37 ft (11 m)
- Draft: 9 ft 6 in (2.90 m) standard; 11 ft 3 in (3.43 m) full load
- Propulsion: 2 × boilers; General Electric turbo-electric drive; 12,000 shp (8.9 MW); 2 × solid manganese-bronze 3,600 lb (1,600 kg) 3-bladed propellers, 8 ft 6 in (2.59 m) diameter, 7 ft 7 in (2.31 m) pitch; 2 × rudders; 359 tons fuel oil
- Speed: 23 knots (43 km/h; 26 mph)
- Range: 3,700 nmi (6,900 km) at 15 kn (28 km/h; 17 mph); 6,000 nmi (11,000 km) at 12 kn (22 km/h; 14 mph)
- Complement: 15 officers, 198 men
- Armament: 3 × 3"/50 caliber guns; 1 × quad 1.1"/75 caliber gun; 8 × single 20 mm guns; 1 × triple 21 inch (533 mm) torpedo tubes; 1 × Hedgehog anti-submarine mortar; 8 × K-gun depth charge projectors; 2 × depth charge tracks

USS Ahrens (DE-575), a Buckley-class destroyer escort of the United States Navy, was named in honor of Private Edward H. Ahrens (1919–1942), who was killed during the Battle of Tulagi and Gavutu–Tanambogo on 8 August 1942. He was posthumously awarded a Navy Cross.

Ahrens was laid down on 5 November 1943 at Hingham, Massachusetts, by the Bethlehem Steel Corporation; launched on 21 December 1943; sponsored by Mrs. Marie Ahrens, the mother of Private First Class Ahrens; and commissioned on 12 February 1944, Lieutenant Commander Morgan H. Hains in command.

== Service history ==
Late in February 1944, Ahrens proceeded to Bermuda for shakedown training. In early April, she sailed to Casco Bay, Maine, for additional training. On 22 April at Norfolk, Virginia, the destroyer escort joined Task Group (TG) 21.11, a hunter/killer group – built around the escort carrier Block Island – which was operating in the Atlantic and Caribbean. On 29 May, the U-549 torpedoed and sank Block Island and Barr (DE-576). Ahrens rescued 673 survivors in a period of 40 minutes. While carrying out rescue operations, the ship assisted the destroyer escort Eugene E. Elmore in locating the submarine. Eugene E. Elmore made two hedgehog attacks which sank the German submarine.

Following repairs at the New York Navy Yard, the destroyer escort carried out training exercises at Casco Bay and Norfolk, Virginia. On 23 July, Ahrens assumed duty as an escort for transatlantic convoys. The highlight of this period came on 13 October after a merchant ship collided with a gasoline tanker, starting large fires on both ships. Following her rescue of survivors, Ahrens and USS Holton (DE-703) succeeded in putting out the fires.

On 15 December, Ahrens sailed with TG 27.7 to join the 7th Fleet in the Pacific. She proceeded to Manus, Admiralty Islands, via the Panama Canal. On 23 January 1945, the destroyer escort touched at Manus. She continued on to Leyte, Philippines, arriving there on 9 February. The vessel was then attached to TG 75.2 to serve as an ocean escort for the Philippine Sea Frontier.

Ahrens escorted merchant and naval convoys until 25 August 1945, During this period, she operated between such points as Hollandia, New Guinea; Manila and Subic Bay, Philippines; Kossol Roads, Palau Islands; Ulithi; and Okinawa.

In late August 1945, Ahrens was detached from the Philippine Sea Frontier and began supporting occupation forces operating in China and Korea, visiting Jinsen, Korea; Chinwangtao, China; and Hong Kong.

The ship began her long voyage back to the United States on 5 November and stopped at Pearl Harbor; San Diego; and the Panama Canal Zone before finally reaching Boston, Massachusetts, on 15 December. She then commenced pre-inactivation overhaul and sailed to Green Cove Springs, Florida, in early 1946. Ahrens was decommissioned there on 24 June 1946, and her name was struck from the Navy List on 1 April 1965.

== Awards ==
Ahrens won two battle stars for her World War II service.
