= USS Haverfield =

U.S. Navy vessel

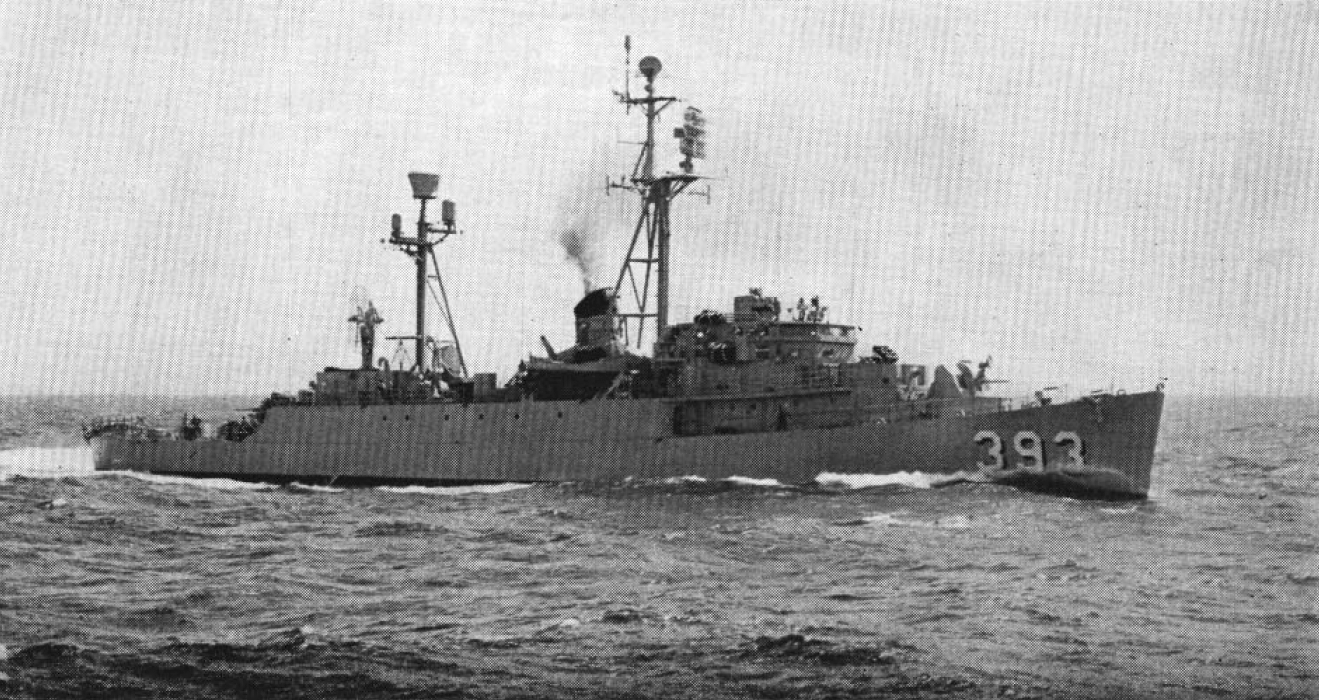
- USS Haverfield (DER-393) in 1960

History

United States
- Name: Haverfield
- Namesake: James Wallace Haverfield
- Builder: Brown Shipbuilding, Houston, Texas
- Laid down: 1 July 1943
- Launched: 30 August 1943
- Commissioned: 29 November 1943
- Decommissioned: 2 June 1969
- Reclassified: DER-393, 2 September 1954
- Stricken: 2 June 1969
- Fate: Sold for scrapping, 15 December 1971

General characteristics
- Class & type: Edsall-class destroyer escort
- Displacement: 1,253 tons standard; 1,590 tons full load
- Length: 306 feet (93.27 m)
- Beam: 36.58 feet (11.15 m)
- Draft: 10.42 full load feet (3.18 m)
- Propulsion: 4 FM diesel engines, 4 diesel-generators, 6,000 shp (4.5 MW), 2 screws
- Speed: 21 knots (39 km/h)
- Range: 9,100 nmi. at 12 knots; (17,000 km at 22 km/h)
- Complement: 8 officers, 201 enlisted
- Armament: 3 × single 3 in (76 mm)/50 guns; 1 × twin 40 mm AA guns; 8 × single 20 mm AA guns; 1 × triple 21 in (533 mm) torpedo tubes; 8 × depth charge projectors; 1 × depth charge projector (hedgehog); 2 × depth charge tracks

USS Haverfield (DE-393) was an Edsall-class destroyer escort built for the U.S. Navy during World War II. She served in the Atlantic Ocean and the Pacific Ocean and provided destroyer escort protection against submarine and air attack for Navy vessels and convoys.

== Namesake ==
James Wallace Haverfield was born 11 April 1917 in Urichsville, Ohio. He attended Ohio State University where he was a member of Beta Theta Pi. After receiving his B.A. degree in 1939, he enlisted in the United States Naval Reserve as an apprentice seaman on 11 September 1940. He accepted an appointment as a midshipman on 16 March 1941 and after completing V-7 Midshipman Program training at Northwestern University, was commissioned as an ensign in the unrestricted line of the U.S. Naval Reserve on 12 June 1941. He then reported to his first assignment aboard the battleship USS Arizona at Naval Base Pearl Harbor, Hawaii on 28 June 1941. He was killed aboard the Arizona during the Japanese Attack on Pearl Harbor on 7 December 1941.

== Construction and commissioning ==
She was launched 30 August 1943 by Brown Shipbuilding Co., Houston, Texas; sponsored by Mrs. George Tracy (Bessie) Haverfield, mother of Ensign Haverfield; and commissioned 29 November.

== World War II North Atlantic operations ==
After shakedown in the Caribbean, Haverfield joined the escort aircraft carrier USS Bogue's hunter-killer (HUK) group in patrolling Atlantic convoy lanes in search of German U-boats. Departing Norfolk, Virginia, 26 February 1944, the hunter-killer group, aided by a Canadian corvette and British aircraft, sank the German submarine U-575 on 23 March. With some seven survivors of the U-boat aboard, Haverfield continued her patrol to Casablanca, where she reported to Commander Moroccan Sea Frontier and turned over the German prisoners 18 March. After returning to Norfolk, Haverfield sailed on her second offensive combat cruise with the Bogue HUK group on 5 May. Operating with another HUK group under the escort carrier USS Block Island, the Bogue force sank the Japanese submarine RO-501, ex-U-1224, at 18°08′N 33°13′W on 13 May as the former German ship was heading for her new home in Japan.

== Sinking of the Block Island ==
Reaching Casablanca 29 May, Haverfield was ordered out that same night to render emergency assistance to survivors of carrier Block Island, sunk by a German torpedo off the Canary Islands. Haverfield rescued one of six Block Island fighter pilots who had been aloft when the carrier sank, but a long search failed to locate the remaining five men.

== End-of-European-war activity ==
After this, Haverfield continued to operate until the European War ended in May 1945 on transatlantic antisubmarine hunter-killer missions as well as on patrol along the icy Great Barrier. When all German U-boats still at sea had been accounted for, the destroyer escort underwent an overhaul at Boston, Massachusetts, and, after intensive training in Cuban waters, sailed for the Pacific via the Panama Canal on 19 July 1945 to be ready for the invasion of Japan.

== Transfer to the Pacific Fleet ==
Reaching Pearl Harbor via the Panama Canal and San Diego, California on 1 August 1945, Haverfield was in port at Pearl Harbor when the war ended in mid-August and at the end of the month assumed convoy escort duty from Saipan to Okinawa. She patrolled the China coast and then streamed her homeward-bound pennant, reaching Boston on 15 February 1946. Haverfield then sailed to Naval Station Green Cove Springs, Florida, 25 March 1946, was decommissioned and went into reserve with that installation's reserve fleet located on the St. Johns River on 30 June 1947.

== Converted to radar picket ship ==
Reclassified DER-393 in September 1954, Haverfield was relocated from the Green Cove Springs Reserve Fleet to the Philadelphia Navy Yard, converted to a radar picket ship, and recommissioned there on 4 January 1955. Fitted with the latest electronic detection equipment and with 50 tons of ballast in her keel to compensate for the topside weight of the new radar antennae, Haverfield trained off the East Coast of the United States and then reported to her new home port, Seattle, Washington, via the Panama Canal and San Diego, California on 23 July 1955. Haverfield served as flagship of the newly created Escort Squadron FIVE (CORTON 5) in addition to regular radar picket patrol off the Pacific coast. After five years of this duty, she reported to Pearl Harbor on 10 April 1959 for similar employment along the Pacific Barrier. Departing Pearl Harbor on 16 May 1960, Haverfleld sailed to a new homeport of Apra Harbor, Guam, to conduct surveillance in the vicinity of the Trust Territory Islands and to ensure the safety and welfare of the islanders.

== Supporting President Eisenhower and bathyscaphe Trieste ==
After participating in Operation Cosmos, which provided navigational aids for and was prepared to render emergency assistance to President Dwight D. Eisenhower's plane as the Chief Executive crossed the Pacific Ocean on a goodwill tour, Haverfield operated with the famed bathyscaphe Trieste as it descended the Mariana Trench to a near-record dive, of 19,300 feet (5,900 m) on 30 June 1960.

== Supporting various causes ==
Following her support of this scientific endeavor, Haverfield conducted antisubmarine and search and rescue patrols among the Bonins, the Marianas, and the Caroline Islands. For almost five years she served primarily in the Trust Territory of the Pacific, though twice she deployed to the Far East. Steaming to Japan in October 1960, she became the first radar picket escort ship to operate with the U.S. 7th Fleet in the Western Pacific. In mid-October 1961 she returned to the Far East; and, upon relieving USS John R. Craig on patrol in the Formosa Strait, she became the first of her type to join in this important peace-keeping operation. She continued intermittent patrols off Taiwan until 10 January 1962 when she steamed via Japan to resume patrol duty out of Guam. In November 1962, Typhoon Karen left widespread destruction on Guam and Haverfield, the first ship to return to storm-wracked Apra Harbor, provided valuable supplies and services in the relief and recovery effort.

== Vietnam operations ==
Haverfield returned to Pearl Harbor March 1965 and, after joining Escort Squadron 5, sailed on 19 June 1965 for duty off of South Vietnam. There she participated in Operation Market Time patrols to guard against the infiltration of North Vietnamese troops and supplies to Viet Cong irregulars in South Vietnam by sea. She served on "Market Time" station for seven months, then returned to Pearl Harbor on 2 February 1966. Departing for the Far East 23 May, she resumed "Market Time" operations on 9 June. Eleven days later, she participated in the most significant action of the operation up to that time.

A 100-foot (30 m), steel-hulled North Vietnamese trawler C-187, attempting to infiltrate "Market Time" patrols with a large cargo of arms and ammunition for the Viet Cong, was detected by USCGC Point League near the mouth of the Cổ Chiên River in the Mekong Delta. A chase and fire fight followed, during which the Coast Guard cutter forced the enemy trawler aground and the enemy abandoned the burning ship. After wiping out enemy shore resistance, "Market Time" units, including Haverfield, sent volunteers on board to fight fires and salvage the captured cargo. While American and South Vietnamese teams extinguished the fires, other volunteers offloaded almost 80 tons of ammunition and arms, including mortars, recoilless rifles, machine guns, and antitank weapons. This represented the largest seizure of the "Market Time" operation and thwarted a determined attempt by the North Vietnamese to supply the Viet Cong.

Haverfield continued "Market Time" patrols during the next five months. In addition, she provided naval gunfire support on 6 September against an enemy on Phu Quoc Island, South Vietnam. She returned to Pearl Harbor on 6 December 1966, remained there until late April 1967, and then resumed patrol duty off South Vietnam.

== Final Decommissioning ==
Haverfield was decommissioned on 2 June 1969 at Naval Base Pearl Harbor. On 2 June 1969 she was struck from the Navy list and on sold for scrapping 15 December 1971 to Chi Shun Hua Steel Co. Ltd. of Kaoshiung, Taiwan for $35,000.00.

== Awards ==
For her participation in World War II, Haverfield was awarded one battle star as well as the Presidential Unit Citation, the American Campaign Medal, the European-African-Middle East Campaign Medal with 1 bronze star (2 awards) and the World War II Victory Medal for her antisubmarine work in the Atlantic. She was also awarded the National Defense Service Medal, the Vietnam Service Medal with one silver star (6 awards), the Republic of Vietnam Gallantry Cross (palm) Unit Citation (2 awards), and the Republic of Vietnam Campaign Medal for her Cold War and Vietnam War service.
