= USS Hubbard =

Buckley-class destroyer escort

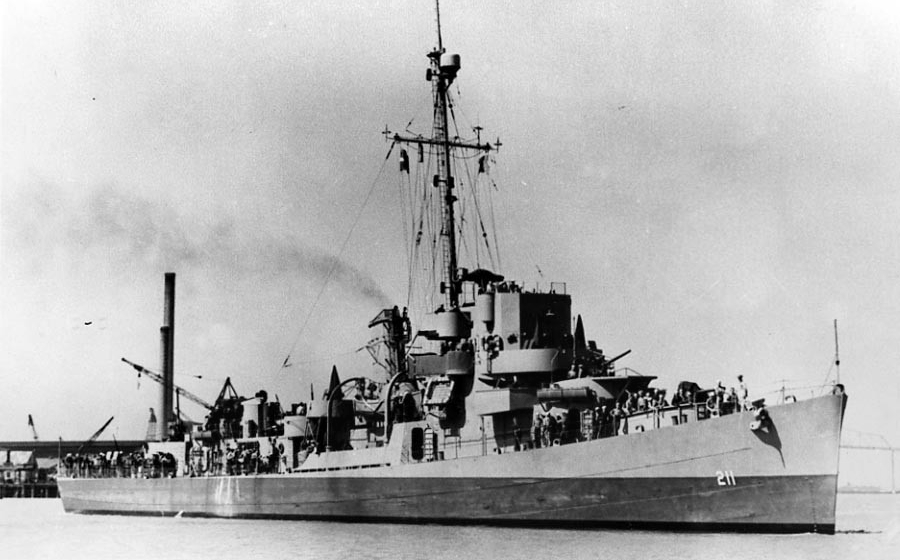

History

United States
- Name: USS Hubbard
- Namesake: Joseph C. Hubbard
- Ordered: 1942
- Builder: Charleston Navy Yard
- Laid down: 11 August 1943
- Launched: 11 November 1943
- Commissioned: 6 March 1944
- Decommissioned: 15 March 1946
- Reclassified: APD-53, 1 June 1945
- Stricken: 1 May 1966
- Honors and awards: 2 battle stars (World War II)
- Fate: Sold for scrap, 1 July 1966

General characteristics
- Class & type: Buckley-class destroyer escort
- Displacement: 1,400 long tons (1,422 t) light; 1,740 long tons (1,768 t) standard
- Length: 306 ft (93 m)
- Beam: 37 ft (11 m)
- Draft: 9 ft 6 in (2.90 m) standard; 11 ft 3 in (3.43 m) full load
- Propulsion: 2 × boilers; General Electric turbo-electric drive; 12,000 shp (8.9 MW); 2 × solid manganese-bronze 3,600 lb (1,600 kg) 3-bladed propellers, 8 ft 6 in (2.59 m) diameter, 7 ft 7 in (2.31 m) pitch; 2 × rudders; 359 tons fuel oil
- Speed: 23 knots (43 km/h; 26 mph)
- Range: 3,700 nmi (6,900 km) at 15 kn (28 km/h; 17 mph); 6,000 nmi (11,000 km) at 12 kn (22 km/h; 14 mph)
- Complement: 15 officers, 198 men
- Armament: 3 × 3"/50 caliber guns; 1 × quad 1.1"/75 caliber gun; 8 × single 20 mm guns; 1 × triple 21 inch (533 mm) torpedo tubes; 1 × Hedgehog anti-submarine mortar; 8 × K-gun depth charge projectors; 2 × depth charge tracks

USS Hubbard (DE-211/APD-53) was a Buckley-class destroyer escort in service with the United States Navy from 1944 to 1946. She was scrapped in 1966.

== History ==
Hubbard was named in honor of Commander Joseph C. Hubbard (1900–1942), who was killed in action, while serving aboard the heavy cruiser USS San Francisco (CA-38) during the Naval Battle of Guadalcanal on 13 November 1942. She was launched by the Charleston Navy Yard on 11 November 1943; sponsored by Mrs. Helen L. Hubbard, widow of Commander Hubbard; and commissioned on 6 March 1944.

Following shakedown training out of Bermuda, the new destroyer escort returned to Norfolk, Virginia on 7 May 1944. She then escorted the oiler Manatee (AO-58) to the Caribbean, returning to Norfolk on 23 May for armament changes. Armed with 40 mm guns in lieu of torpedo tubes, Hubbard sailed with her first convoy on 1 June, seeing the transports safely to Bizerte, Tunisia and returning to New York on 19 July 1944. She subsequently made two more convoy crossings in 1944, and underwent anti-submarine training at Casco Bay, Maine, between voyages.

Hubbard sailed on 26 December 1944 with other destroyer escorts to hunt down weather-reporting U-boats in the Atlantic. Equipped with the latest direction-finding gear, the ships scouted the suspected area until they came upon U-248 on 16 January 1945. Depth charge attacks sank the German marauder late that morning. The ships arrived New York on 6 February and, after additional training in Casco Bay, sailed again to search for submarines 4 April from NS Argentia, Newfoundland. As part of "Operation Teardrop", she took part in the destruction of the last desperate U-boat group to sortie, with escort carriers Bogue (CVE-9), Core (CVE-13), and many sister ships. Frederick C. Davis (DE-136) was torpedoed and sunk suddenly on 24 April, and Hubbard joined in hunting the attacker. After many depth charge attacks, four by Hubbard alone, U-546 surfaced. The destroyer escorts' guns quickly sank the submarine.

Hubbard returned to Boston on 10 May 1945 and began her conversion to a Charles Lawrence-class high speed transport, suitable for the still-active Pacific War. She was reclassified APD-53 on 1 June 1945 and emerged from Sullivans Dry Dock, Brooklyn, on 14 August, the day before the surrender of Japan.

Following three months of training operations in the Caribbean and Casco Bay, Hubbard arrived Green Cove Springs, Florida, on 12 November 1945. She decommissioned on 15 March 1946 and entered the Reserve Fleet, where she remained being struck from the Navy List on 1 May 1966 and scrapped.

== Awards ==
Hubbard received two battle stars for World War II service.
