= USS Hayter =

Buckley-class destroyer escort

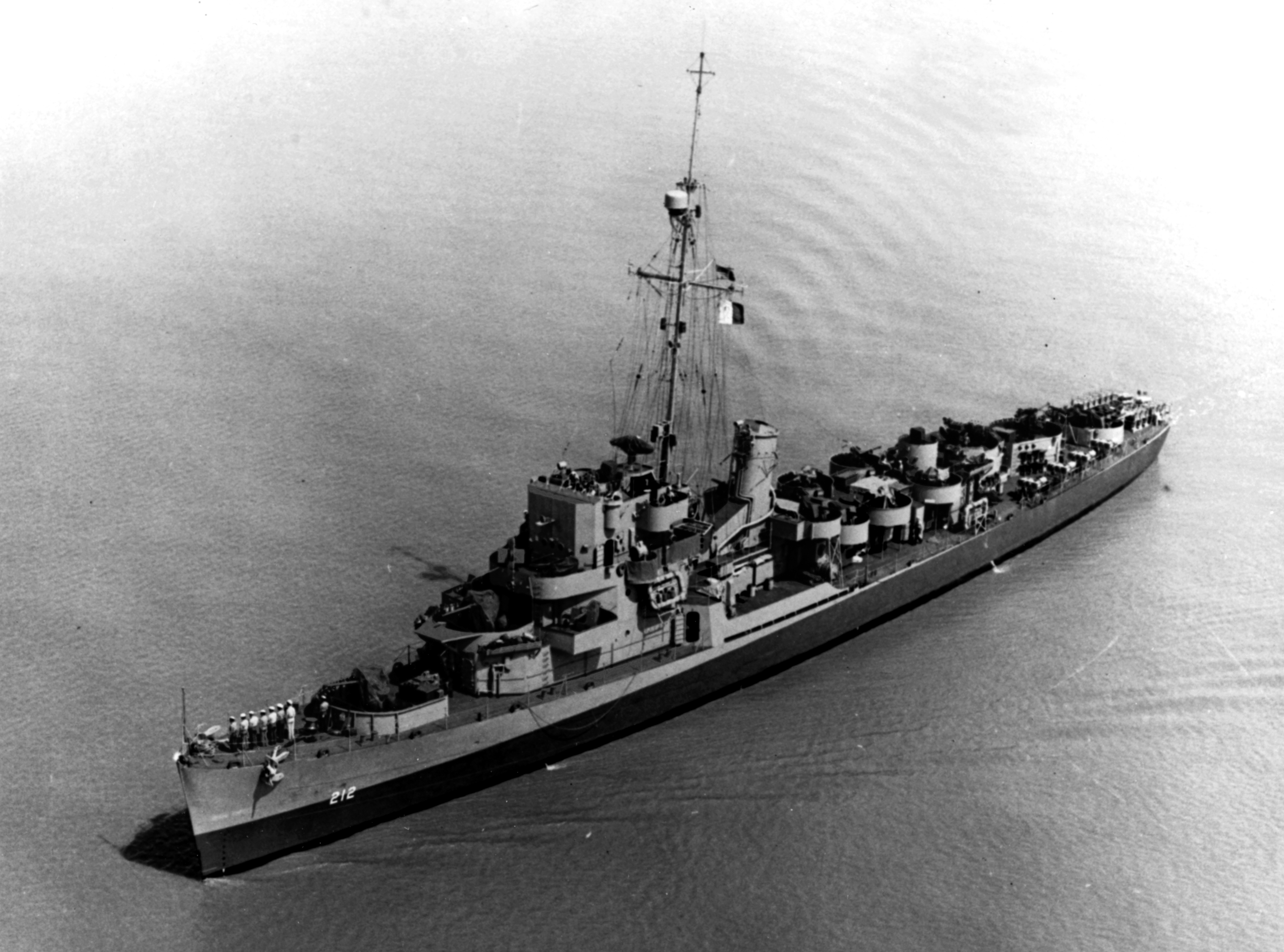

History

United States
- Name: USS Hayter
- Namesake: Hubert M. Hayter
- Ordered: 1942
- Builder: Charleston Navy Yard
- Laid down: 11 August 1943
- Launched: 11 November 1943
- Commissioned: 16 March 1944
- Decommissioned: 19 March 1946
- Reclassified: APD-80, 1 June 1945
- Stricken: 1 December 1966
- Fate: Loaned to South Korea, 23 July 1967; Sold to South Korea, 15 November 1974

South Korea
- Name: ROKS Jon Nam (PG-86)
- Acquired: 23 July 1967
- Commissioned: August 1967
- Reclassified: APD-86, 1972; APD-827, 1980; DE-827, 1982
- Fate: Stricken and scrapped, 1986

General characteristics
- Class & type: Buckley-class destroyer escort
- Displacement: 1,400 long tons (1,422 t) light; 1,740 long tons (1,768 t) standard
- Length: 306 ft (93 m)
- Beam: 37 ft (11 m)
- Draft: 9 ft 6 in (2.90 m) standard; 11 ft 3 in (3.43 m) full load
- Propulsion: 2 × boilers; General Electric turbo-electric drive; 12,000 shp (8.9 MW); 2 × solid manganese-bronze 3,600 lb (1,600 kg) 3-bladed propellers, 8 ft 6 in (2.59 m) diameter, 7 ft 7 in (2.31 m) pitch; 2 × rudders; 359 tons fuel oil
- Speed: 23 knots (43 km/h; 26 mph)
- Range: 3,700 nmi (6,900 km) at 15 kn (28 km/h; 17 mph); 6,000 nmi (11,000 km) at 12 kn (22 km/h; 14 mph)
- Complement: 15 officers, 198 men
- Armament: 3 × 3"/50 caliber guns; 1 × quad 1.1"/75 caliber gun; 8 × single 20 mm guns; 1 × triple 21 inch (533 mm) torpedo tubes; 1 × Hedgehog anti-submarine mortar; 8 × K-gun depth charge projectors; 2 × depth charge tracks

USS Hayter (DE-212/APD-80) was a Buckley-class destroyer escort in service with the United States Navy from 1943 to 1946. In 1967, she was transferred to South Korea where she served as ROKS Jonnam until 1986.

== History ==
=== United States Navy (1943–1967) ===
Hayter was launched by Charleston Navy Yard, con 11 November 1943; sponsored by Mrs. Maurine K. Hayter, widow of the namesake; and commissioned at Charleston on 16 March 1944.

Hayter departed Charleston on 1 April 1944 for shakedown training off Bermuda, and subsequently was assigned to an escort division for Atlantic duty. Between 1 June and 30 November 1944, she made three voyages to Europe, two from Norfolk, Virginia to Bizerte and one from Casco, Maine, to Bizerte. During the voyages Hayter provided anti-submarine protection and transferred the division doctor to many merchant ships in the convoy needing medical assistance.

Hayter sailed on 2 January 1945 on a special duty in the Atlantic, with other units of Escort Division 62. Their assignment to find and sink U-248, which had been sending vital weather reports to Axis units from the Azores area. The ships conducted several search sweeps before Hayter made contact with the submarine on 16 January, and after a series of depth charge attacks lasting two hours the submarine was sunk. Hayter patrolled the Azores for a time, then joined a convoy screen for the voyage back to Norfolk, arriving on 5 February 1945.

Departing Casco Bay on 17 March, Hayter and her escorts proceeded into the north Atlantic for anti-submarine sweeps in the Iceland area. The ships made a depth charge attack on 10 April, but did not score a definite kill. The group returned to NS Argentia, Newfoundland, on 14 April, and departed four days later for anti-submarine barrier patrol, cruising between escort carriers Bogue (CVE-9) to the south, and Core (CVE-13), to the north. Contact was made on 23 April and all ships searched without avail until the next day, when escort Frederick C. Davis (DE-136) reported contact on her starboard bow.

As Hayter maneuvered to attack, Frederick C. Davis was struck by a torpedo on her port side amidships, breaking her in two. As the stricken ship settled and sank, Hayter began rescue operations, and despite rough seas, sharks, and the threat of further attacks, managed to save 65 survivors and recover 12 of the dead from the sea. Three of the survivors were revived by artificial respiration given by members of Hayter's crew. In the meantime, the other escorts had closed in on the submarine, U-546, and forced it to the surface. Guns quickly sank the U-boat and her captain was later made prisoner.

Hayter arrived Argentia on 6 May and sailed two days later for Philadelphia Navy Yard via Boston. She arrived on 22 May and began her conversion to a Charles Lawrence-class high speed transport, her designation becoming APD-80 on 1 June 1945.

Emerging as a high speed transport, Hayter departed Philadelphia on 13 August 1945 for her refresher training off Guantanamo Bay. She subsequently operated out of Norfolk and Newport in training operations until 30 October, when she departed Norfolk for Jacksonville, Florida.

At Jacksonville, Hayter was placed in the Reserve Fleet at Green Cove Springs, Florida, decommissioned on 19 March 1946 and was later moved to the Texas group, where she remained until struck on 1 December 1966.

=== Republic of Korea Navy (1967–1986) ===
Transferred to South Korea on 23 July 1967, the ex-Hayter was commissioned into the South Korean Navy in August of that year as gunboat ROKS Jonnam (PG-86) (also spelled Jon Nam). Reclassified as escort transport APD-86 in 1972, Jonnam was purchased outright by South Korea on 15 November 1974, redesignated APD-827 in 1980, and again to DE-827 in 1982. She was stricken in 1986.

== Namesake ==
USS Hayter was named in honor of Lieutenant Commander Hubert M. Hayter (1901–1942), who was killed in action, while serving aboard the cruiser USS New Orleans during the Battle of Tassafaronga on 30 November 1942. Lieutenant Commander Hayter was serving as damage control officer when New Orleans received a torpedo hit, and as Central Station, his battle post, filled with asphyxiating gas he ordered all men without masks to leave the compartment giving his own to a partially stricken seaman. After clearing the compartment of all personnel, Lt. Cmdr. Hayter was finally overcome by the fumes. For this extraordinary act of heroism he was posthumously awarded the Navy Cross.
