= German submarine U-549 =

German World War II submarine

History

Nazi Germany
- Name: U-549
- Ordered: 5 June 1941
- Builder: Deutsche Werft, Hamburg
- Yard number: 370
- Laid down: 28 September 1942
- Launched: 28 April 1943
- Commissioned: 14 July 1943
- Fate: Sunk on 29 May 1944

General characteristics
- Class & type: Type IXC/40 submarine
- Displacement: 1,144 t (1,126 long tons) surfaced; 1,257 t (1,237 long tons) submerged
- Length: 76.76 m (251 ft 10 in) o/a; 58.75 m (192 ft 9 in) pressure hull
- Beam: 6.86 m (22 ft 6 in) o/a; 4.44 m (14 ft 7 in) pressure hull
- Height: 9.60 m (31 ft 6 in)
- Draught: 4.67 m (15 ft 4 in)
- Installed power: 4,400 PS (3,200 kW; 4,300 bhp) (diesels); 1,000 PS (740 kW; 990 shp) (electric)
- Propulsion: 2 shafts; 2 × diesel engines; 2 × electric motors
- Speed: 18.3 knots (33.9 km/h; 21.1 mph) surfaced; 7.3 knots (13.5 km/h; 8.4 mph) submerged
- Range: 13,850 nmi (25,650 km; 15,940 mi) at 10 knots (19 km/h; 12 mph) surfaced; 63 nmi (117 km; 72 mi) at 4 knots (7.4 km/h; 4.6 mph) submerged
- Test depth: 230 m (750 ft)
- Complement: 4 officers, 44 enlisted
- Armament: 6 × torpedo tubes (4 bow, 2 stern); 22 × 53.3 cm (21 in) torpedoes; 1 × 10.5 cm (4.1 in) SK C/32 deck gun (180 rounds); 1 × 3.7 cm (1.5 in) SK C/30 AA gun; 1 × twin 2 cm FlaK 30 AA guns

Service record
- Part of: 4th U-boat Flotilla; 14 July – 31 December 1943; 10th U-boat Flotilla; 1 January – 29 May 1944
- Identification codes: M 53 434
- Commanders: Kptlt. Detlev Krankenhagen; 14 July 1943 – 29 May 1944
- Operations: 2 patrols: 1st patrol: 11 January – 26 March 1944; 2nd patrol: 14 – 29 May 1944
- Victories: 1 warship sunk (9,393 tons); 1 warship damaged (1,300 tons)

German submarine U-549 was a Type IXC/40 U-boat of Nazi Germany's Kriegsmarine during World War II. The submarine was laid down on 28 September 1942 at the Deutsche Werft yard in Hamburg, launched on 28 April 1943, and commissioned on 14 July 1943 under the command of Kapitänleutnant Detlev Krankenhagen. After training with the 4th U-boat Flotilla at Stettin, the U-boat was transferred to the 10th U-boat Flotilla for front-line service on 1 January 1944.

== Design ==
German Type IXC/40 submarines were slightly larger than the original Type IXCs. U-549 had a displacement of 1,144 tonnes (1,126 long tons) when at the surface and 1,257 tonnes (1,237 long tons) while submerged. The U-boat had a total length of 76.76 m (251 ft 10 in), a pressure hull length of 58.75 m (192 ft 9 in), a beam of 6.86 m (22 ft 6 in), a height of 9.60 m (31 ft 6 in), and a draught of 4.67 m (15 ft 4 in). The submarine was powered by two MAN M 9 V 40/46 supercharged four-stroke, nine-cylinder diesel engines producing a total of 4,400 metric horsepower (3,240 kW; 4,340 shp) for use while surfaced, two Siemens-Schuckert 2 GU 345/34 double-acting electric motors producing a total of 1,000 shaft horsepower (1,010 PS; 750 kW) for use while submerged. She had two shafts and two 1.92 m (6 ft) propellers. The boat was capable of operating at depths of up to 230 metres (750 ft).

The submarine had a maximum surface speed of 18.3 knots (33.9 km/h; 21.1 mph) and a maximum submerged speed of 7.3 knots (13.5 km/h; 8.4 mph). When submerged, the boat could operate for 63 nautical miles (117 km; 72 mi) at 4 knots (7.4 km/h; 4.6 mph); when surfaced, she could travel 13,850 nautical miles (25,650 km; 15,940 mi) at 10 knots (19 km/h; 12 mph). U-549 was fitted with six 53.3 cm (21 in) torpedo tubes (four fitted at the bow and two at the stern), 22 torpedoes, one 10.5 cm (4.13 in) SK C/32 naval gun, 180 rounds, and a 3.7 cm (1.5 in) SK C/30 as well as a 2 cm (0.79 in) C/30 anti-aircraft gun. The boat had a complement of forty-eight.

== Service history ==
=== First patrol ===
U-549 departed Kiel on 11 January 1944, and sailed out into the mid-Atlantic, via the gap between Iceland and the Faroe Islands, but had no success. The U-boat arrived at Lorient in occupied France on 26 March after 76 days at sea.

=== Second patrol and loss ===
The U-boat left Lorient on 14 May 1944 and sailed to the waters north-west of the Canary Islands. At 20:13 on 29 May 1944, U-549 slipped through the anti-submarine screen of the hunter-killer group TG 21.11, and fired three T-3 torpedoes at the escort carrier USS Block Island, hitting her with two, and severely damaging the ship which later sank. At 20.40 hours the U-boat fired a salvo of T-5 acoustic torpedoes, badly damaging the destroyer escort Barr (DE-576), and missing the Eugene E. Elmore (DE-686). A counter-attack with depth charges was launched by Ahrens (DE-575) and Eugene E. Elmore which sank the U-boat, in position 31°13′N 23°03′W. All 57 hands were lost.

=== Wolfpacks ===
U-549 took part in three wolfpacks, namely:

- Igel 1 (3 – 17 February 1944)
- Hai 1 (17 – 22 February 1944)
- Preussen (22 February – 22 March 1944)

== Summary of raiding history ==
Date	Ship Name	Nationality	Tonnage (Note: Merchant ship tonnages are in gross register tons. Military vessels are listed by tons displacement.)	Fate
29 May 1944	USS Barr	United States Navy	1,300	Damaged
29 May 1944	USS Block Island	United States Navy	9,393	Sunk

== Bibliography ==
- Busch, Rainer; Röll, Hans-Joachim (1999). German U-boat commanders of World War II : a biographical dictionary. Translated by Brooks, Geoffrey. London, Annapolis, Md: Greenhill Books, Naval Institute Press. ISBN 1-55750-186-6.
- Busch, Rainer; Röll, Hans-Joachim (1999). Deutsche U-Boot-Verluste von September 1939 bis Mai 1945 [German U-boat losses from September 1939 to May 1945]. Der U-Boot-Krieg (in German). Vol. IV. Hamburg, Berlin, Bonn: Mittler. ISBN 3-8132-0514-2.
- Gröner, Erich; Jung, Dieter; Maass, Martin (1991). U-boats and Mine Warfare Vessels. German Warships 1815–1945. Vol. 2. Translated by Thomas, Keith; Magowan, Rachel. London: Conway Maritime Press. ISBN 0-85177-593-4.
- Kemp, Paul (1999). U-Boats Destroyed - German Submarine Losses in the World Wars. London: Arms & Armour. ISBN 1-85409-515-3.
