= USS Eugene E. Elmore =

American Rudderow-class destroyer escort

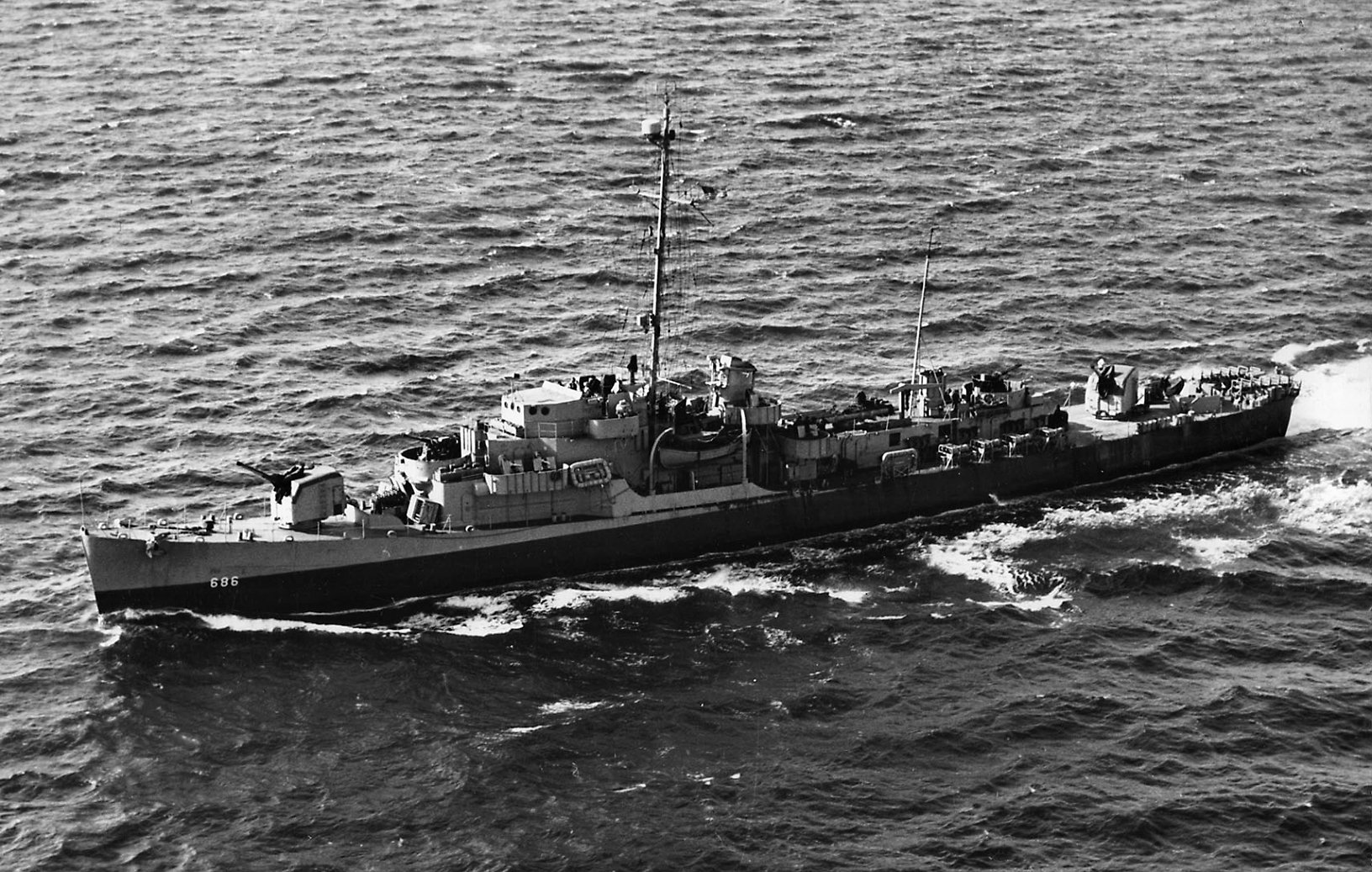

History

United States
- Name: USS Eugene E. Elmore
- Namesake: Eugene E. Elmore
- Builder: Bethlehem-Hingham Shipyard
- Laid down: 27 November 1943
- Launched: 23 December 1943
- Sponsored by: Mrs. Marie Link Elmore, widow of Lieutenant Commander Elmore
- Commissioned: 4 February 1944
- Decommissioned: 31 May 1946
- Fate: Sold for scrap, 1969

General characteristics
- Class & type: Rudderow
- Type: Destroyer escort
- Displacement: 1,450 tons
- Length: 306 feet
- Beam: 36 feet, 10 inches
- Draft: 9 feet 8 inches
- Speed: 24 knots
- Complement: 186
- Armament: 2 × 5 in/38 cal (127 mm) (2x1); 4 × 40-mm/70 (2x2); 10 × 20 mm (10x1); 3 × 21 inch (533 mm) torpedo tubes (1x3); 1 Hedgehog depth bomb thrower; 8 depth charge projectors (8x1); 2 depth charge racks

USS Eugene E. Elmore (DE-686) was a Rudderow-class destroyer escort in the United States Navy during World War II.

== Namesake ==
Eugene Evans Elmore was born on 30 June 1900 in Americus, Georgia. He graduated from the United States Naval Academy in 1922, and served on a number of ships as well as ashore before reporting 25 October 1940 to USS Quincy. Lieutenant Commander Elmore was killed in action when Quincy was sunk 9 August 1942 in the Battle of Savo Island.

== Service ==
Eugene E. Elmore was launched 23 December 1943 by Bethlehem Steel Co., Quincy, Massachusetts, sponsored by Mrs. Marie Link Elmore, widow of the ship's namesake and commissioned 4 February 1944.

On 22 April 1944 at Norfolk, Virginia, Eugene E. Elmore joined a hunter-killer group formed around the Bogue-class escort carrier, USS Block Island (CVE-21) and sailed for Casablanca to provide cover for Atlantic convoys. On 29 May, during the return passage, Block Island and one of her escorts USS Barr (DE-576) were torpedoed by U-549. Block Island sunk a few hours later, although most of her crew was rescued. USS Ahrens (DE-575) who was rescuing survivors, made a submarine contact and directed Eugene E. Elmore toward the target. Eugene E. Elmore used her hedgehog spigot mortar system and depth charges to sank U-549 in position 31°13′N 23°03′W using, which went down with all 57 crew. Eugene E. Elmore then assisted Barr and took her in tow for Casablanca, being relieved on 2 June, a day before reaching port.

Eugene E. Elmore returned to New York City 13 June 1944, and during the next 4½ months made two voyages escorting convoys to the Mediterranean. On 3 November she got underway from New York for the South Pacific, arriving at Hollandia 11 December to join the 7th Fleet. She cleared Hollandia 30 December and at Biak, joined the convoy escort for operations around Lingayen Gulf. Arriving on 12 January 1945, Eugene E. Elmore joined the ships providing antiaircraft fire to protect the assault shipping for 2 days then sailed to San Pedro Bay to prepare for the landings at Subic Bay 29 January.

The escort vessel continued to operate out of San Pedro Bay, supporting the battles of the Philippines by escorting convoys from Biak, the Palaus, Ulithi and New Guinea. Between 13 July 1945 and 22 August, she twice escorted convoys from the Philippines to Okinawa and on 3 September arrived off Okinawa for occupation duty. In October she escorted transports carrying men to Jinsen, Korea and on 15 October, sailed from Okinawa for San Diego, arriving 5 November. There she was decommissioned and placed in reserve on 31 May 1946.

Eugene E. Elmore received four battle stars for World War II service.

== See also ==
- List of destroyer escorts of the United States Navy
