= USS Otter =

Buckley-class destroyer escort

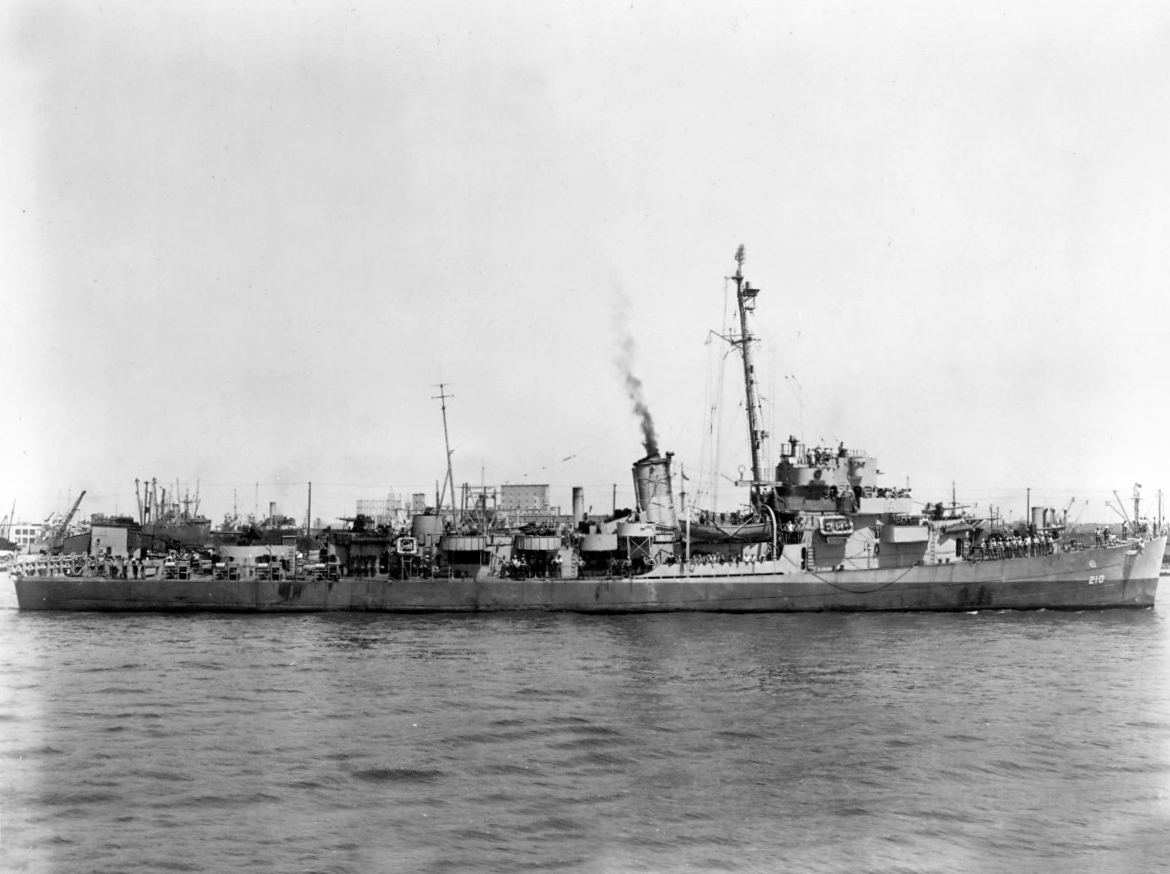

History

United States
- Name: USS Otter (DE-210)
- Namesake: Lt. Bethel V. Otter
- Ordered: 1942
- Builder: Charleston Navy Yard
- Laid down: 26 July 1943
- Launched: 23 October 1943
- Commissioned: 21 February 1944
- Decommissioned: January 1947
- Honors and awards: 1 battle star (World War II)
- Fate: Sunk as target off Puerto Rico, 10 July 1970

General characteristics
- Class & type: Buckley-class destroyer escort
- Displacement: 1,400 long tons (1,422 t) light; 1,740 long tons (1,768 t) standard
- Length: 306 ft (93 m)
- Beam: 37 ft (11 m)
- Draft: 9 ft 6 in (2.90 m) standard; 11 ft 3 in (3.43 m) full load
- Propulsion: 2 × boilers; General Electric turbo-electric drive; 12,000 shp (8.9 MW); 2 × solid manganese-bronze 3,600 lb (1,600 kg) 3-bladed propellers, 8 ft 6 in (2.59 m) diameter, 7 ft 7 in (2.31 m) pitch; 2 × rudders; 359 tons fuel oil
- Speed: 23 knots (43 km/h; 26 mph)
- Range: 3,700 nmi (6,900 km) at 15 kn (28 km/h; 17 mph); 6,000 nmi (11,000 km) at 12 kn (22 km/h; 14 mph)
- Complement: 15 officers, 198 men
- Armament: 3 × 3"/50 caliber guns; 1 × quad 1.1"/75 caliber gun; 8 × single 20 mm guns; 1 × triple 21 inch (533 mm) torpedo tubes; 1 × Hedgehog anti-submarine mortar; 8 × K-gun depth charge projectors; 2 × depth charge tracks

USS Otter (DE-210), a Buckley-class destroyer escort of the United States Navy, in service from 1944 to 1947. She was finally sunk as a target in 1970.

== History ==
USS Otter was named in honor of Lieutenant Bethel V. Otter (1914-1942), who was killed in action on Corregidor on 6 May 1942. She was laid down on 26 July 1943 by the Charleston Navy Yard; launched on 23 October 1943; sponsored by Mrs. William M. Otter, the mother of Lieutenant Otter; commissioned on 21 February 1944.

=== Battle of the Atlantic ===
Following a Bermuda shakedown, Otter joined the Atlantic Fleet and escorted two carriers to Casablanca, then, for the remainder of the year, she helped protect convoys shuttling from the United States to various Mediterranean ports. Throughout these operations not a single ship was lost.

In December 1944, Otter and three of her sister ships formed a task group to hunt and destroy German U-boats in the middle and north Atlantic. On 16 January 1945, without assistance from aircraft, the group located and sank U-248. Otter, after playing a crucial role in the depth charge attack, proudly displayed a submarine silhouette on her bridge.

In April, this task group joined a large task force of destroyer escorts and escort carriers patrolling the shipping lanes of the North Atlantic and searching for submarines. During these operations, destroyer escort Frederick C. Davis (DE-136) was torpedoed and sunk, and while other ships of the group engaged and sank U-546, Otter assisted in the rescue of survivors.

Upon the end of the war in Europe, Otter was one of the ships assigned to accept the surrender of German submarines. She intercepted a U-boat east of Newfoundland, put a boarding party on board, and escorted the submarine, the second to surrender, over a thousand miles to the East Coast of the United States.

Otter then began to refit for the Pacific War. The end of hostilities changed plans and Otter was assigned to the Naval Submarine Base New London, Connecticut, to assist in submarine training.

=== Fate ===
By directive dated January 1947, Otter was placed out of commission, in reserve, attached to the United States Atlantic Reserve Fleet and berthed in Florida. She was finally sunk as target off Puerto Rico on 10 July 1970.

== Awards ==
Otter received one battle star for service in World War II.
