= USS Block Island (CVE-21) =

Aircraft carrier of the United States Navy which was sunk in World War II

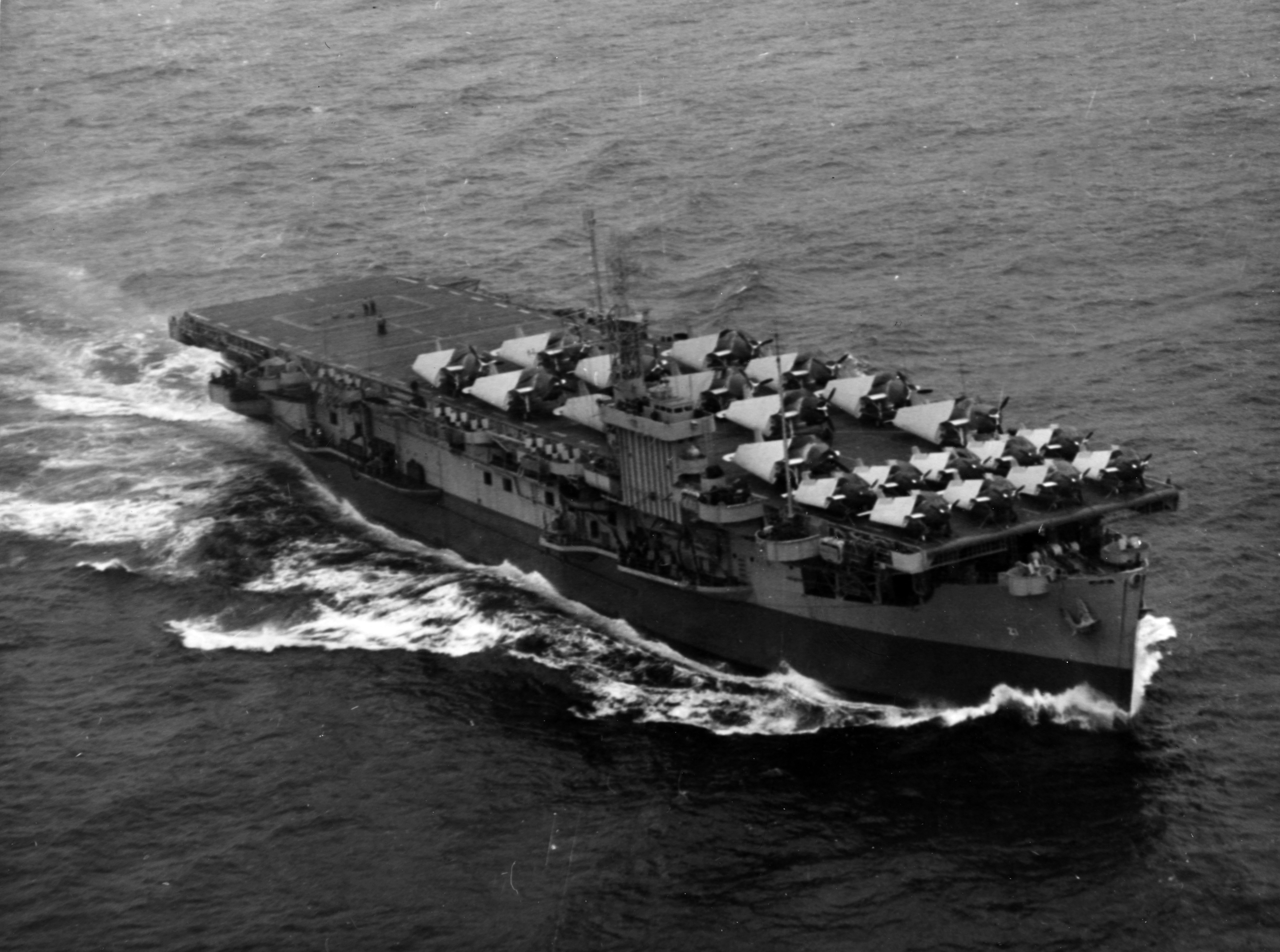
- USS Block Island underway with a deckload of aircraft, 15 October 1943.

History

United States
- Name: USS Block Island
- Namesake: Block Island Sound
- Builder: Seattle-Tacoma Shipbuilding Corporation
- Laid down: 19 January 1942
- Launched: 1 May 1942
- Sponsored by: Mrs. H. B. Hutchinson
- Commissioned: 8 March 1943
- Honors and awards: 2 Battle Stars
- Fate: Torpedoed and scuttled by escort screen, 29 May 1944

General characteristics
- Class & type: Bogue-class escort carrier
- Displacement: 16,620 long tons (16,887 t)
- Length: 495.66 ft (151.08 m)
- Beam: 111 ft 6 in (33.99 m)
- Draft: 26 ft (7.9 m)
- Installed power: 8,500 shp (6,300 kW)
- Propulsion: 1 × Allis-Chalmers geared steam turbine; 1 × shaft
- Speed: 18 knots (33 km/h; 21 mph)
- Complement: 890 officers and enlisted
- Armament: 2 × 4-inch/50, 5-inch/38 or 5-inch/51/38 cal dual purpose guns
- Aircraft carried: 24
- Aviation facilities: 2 × elevators

USS Block Island (CVE-21/AVG-21/ACV-21) was a Bogue-class escort carrier for the United States Navy during World War II. She was the first of two escort carriers named after Block Island Sound off Rhode Island and was the only American carrier sunk in the Atlantic during the war.

Originally classified AVG-21, she became ACV-21 on 20 August 1942, and CVE-21 on 15 July 1943. She was named after Block Island, an island in Rhode Island east of New York.

== Construction and commissioning ==
Block Island was launched on 6 June 1942 by Seattle-Tacoma Shipbuilding Corporation in Tacoma, Washington, under a Maritime Commission contract; sponsored by Mrs H. B. Hutchinson, wife of Commander Hutchinson. She transferred to the United States Navy on 1 May 1942 and commissioned on 8 March 1943, with Captain Logan C Ramsey in command.

== Aircraft carried ==
Block Island had capacity for up to 24 fighter and anti-submarine aircraft normally a mixture of Grumman Wildcat and Avengers with composition dependent upon the mission. The squadron had the callsign VC-25 USN (Composite Squadron Twenty Five).

When she was utilized in a ferry role, she could carry up to 90 aircraft depending on aircraft type.

== Service history ==
Departing San Diego, California in May 1943, Block Island steamed to Norfolk, Virginia, to join the Atlantic Fleet. She then made two trips from New York City to Belfast, Northern Ireland, carrying Republic P-47 Thunderbolt fighters.

USS Bogue and USS Card had pioneered new anti-submarine warfare (ASW) techniques in the Battle of the Atlantic, forming hunter-killer groups to destroy German submarines. Block Island formed another group with four veteran flush-deck destroyers, Paul Jones, Parrott, Barker, and Bulmer as Task Group (TG) 21.1. During her four anti-submarine cruises, Block Island's aircraft sank two submarines and shared another two with her escorts.

On 28 October 1943, her Avenger and Wildcat aircraft sank U-220 with depth charges at 48°53′N 33°30′W. The German submarine's entire crew was killed.

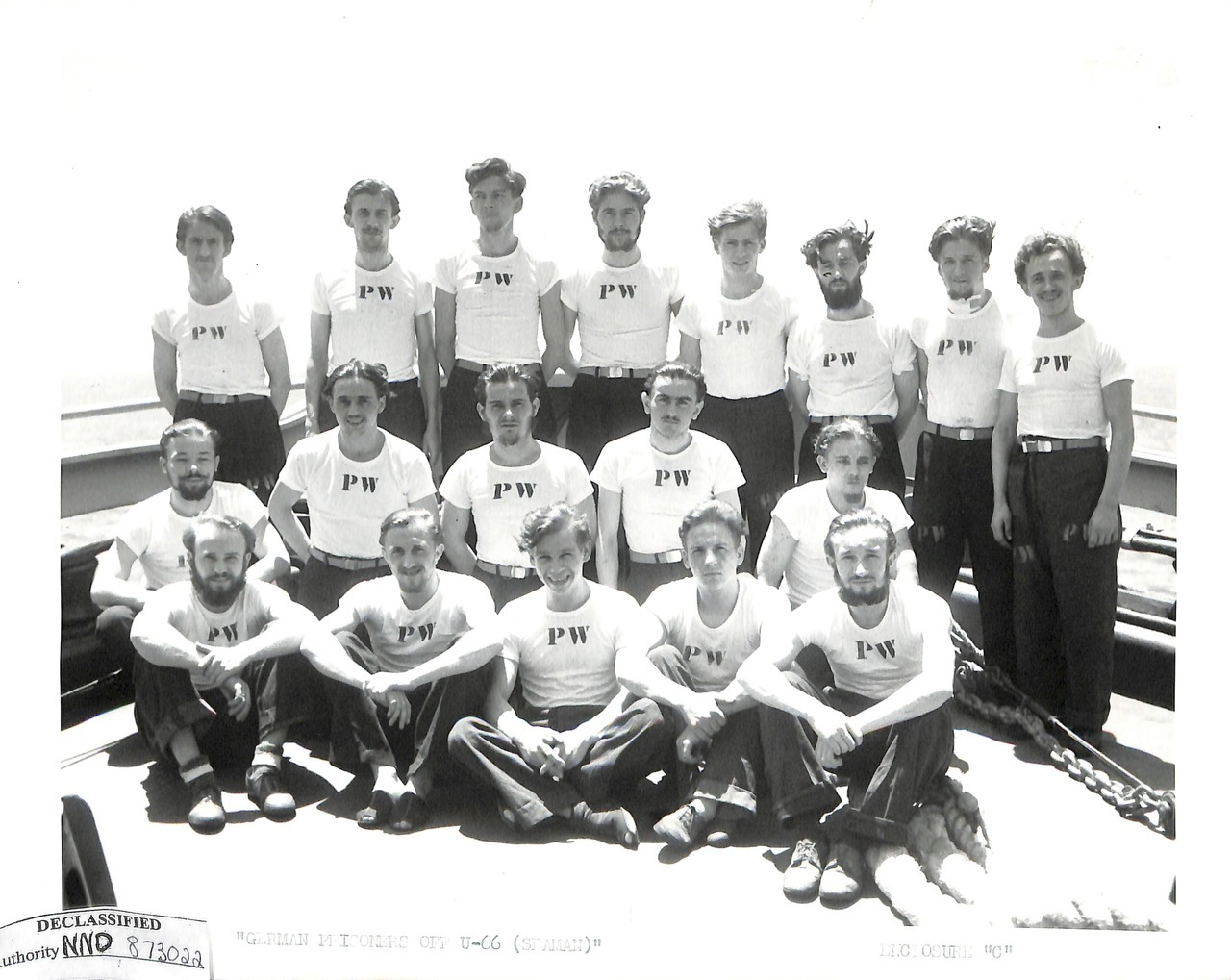
Survivors from U-66 aboard Block Island

On 17 March 1944, Block Island, the destroyer Corry, and destroyer escort Bronstein sank U-801 at 16°42′N 30°20′W. Nine of the boat's crew were killed and 47 taken prisoner.

On 19 March 1944, her aircraft sank U-1059 in 13°10′N 33°44′W southwest of the Cape Verde Islands. U-1059 was transporting torpedoes to the Monsun Gruppe ("Monsoon Group"), a group of U-boats that operated in the Pacific and Indian Oceans. Of U-1059's crew, 47 were killed and 8 captured.

On 6 May 1944, Block Island and the destroyer escort Buckley sank U-66 at 17°17′N 32°29′W. The boat lost 24 killed and there were 36 survivors, later transferred to Block Island.

=== Sinking ===
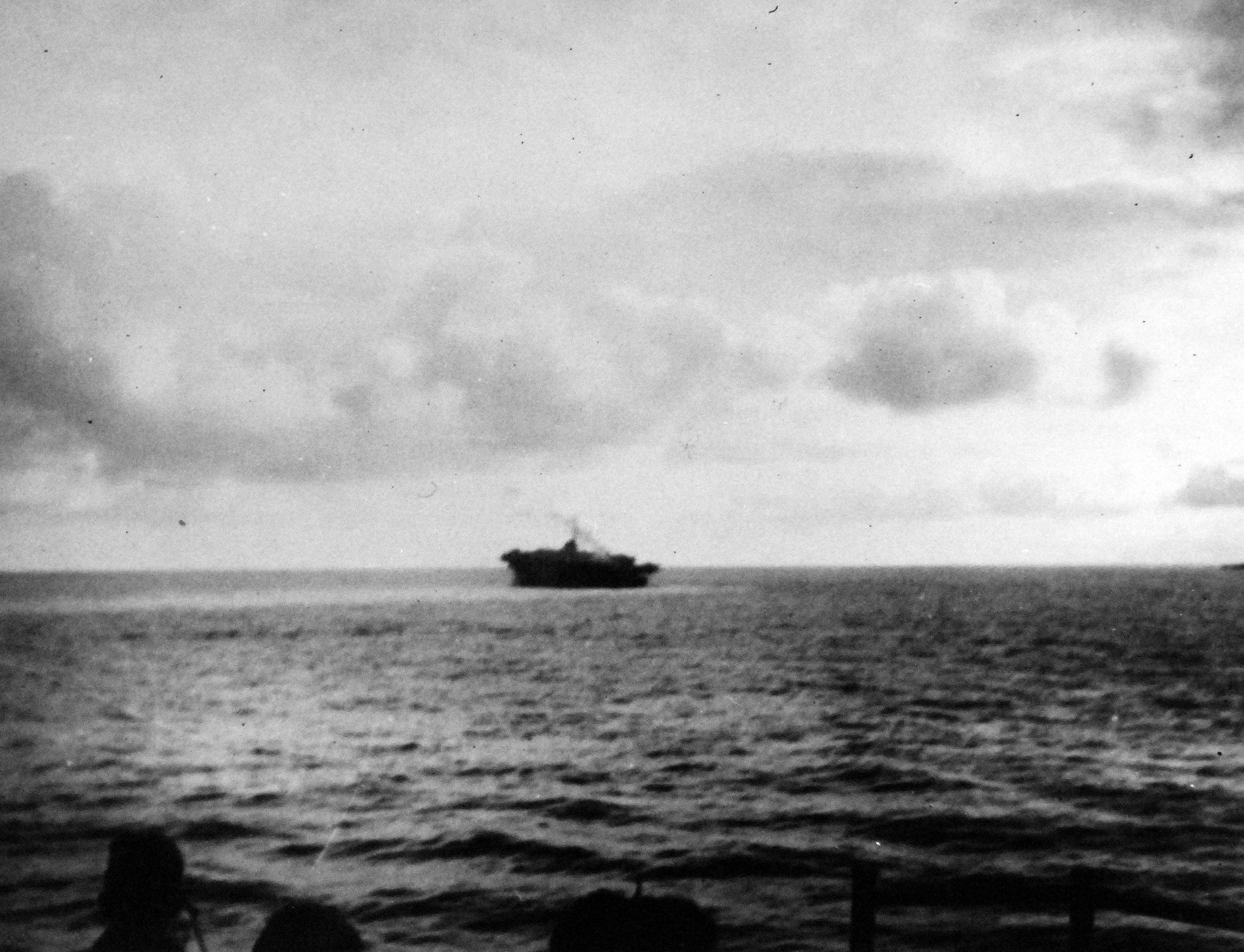
Block Island down by the stern after being torpedoed by the German submarine U-549 in the Atlantic Ocean, 29 May 1944.

Block Island was torpedoed off the Canary Islands at 20:13 on 29 May 1944 by U-549 which had slipped through her screen of escorts. U-549 fired three T-3 torpedoes, scoring two hits that fatally crippled Block Island which sank an hour and a half later. Six crewmen were killed in the attack; the remaining 951 were rescued by the escorting ships.

Eugene E. Elmore attacked and sank U-549 using her hedgehog spigot mortar system and depth charges in 31°13′N 23°03′W.

When Block Island was torpedoed, six of her Wildcats (VC-55) were in the air and had no place to land. They headed for the Canary Islands but all had to ditch at night after running out of fuel and only two of the pilots were rescued.

== Awards ==
Block Island received two battle stars for her service.

== See also ==
- List of U.S. Navy losses in World War II
