= James Blackwood (disambiguation) =

James Blackwood (1919–2002) was an American Gospel music singer.

James Blackwood may also refer to:

- James Blackwood, 2nd Baron Dufferin and Claneboye (1755–1836)
- James Blackwood, prisoner on the St. Michael of Scarborough
- James Douglas Blackwood (1881–1942), doctor and officer in the United States Navy, namesake of the USS J. Douglas Blackwood
