= USS Major =

Buckley-class destroyer escort

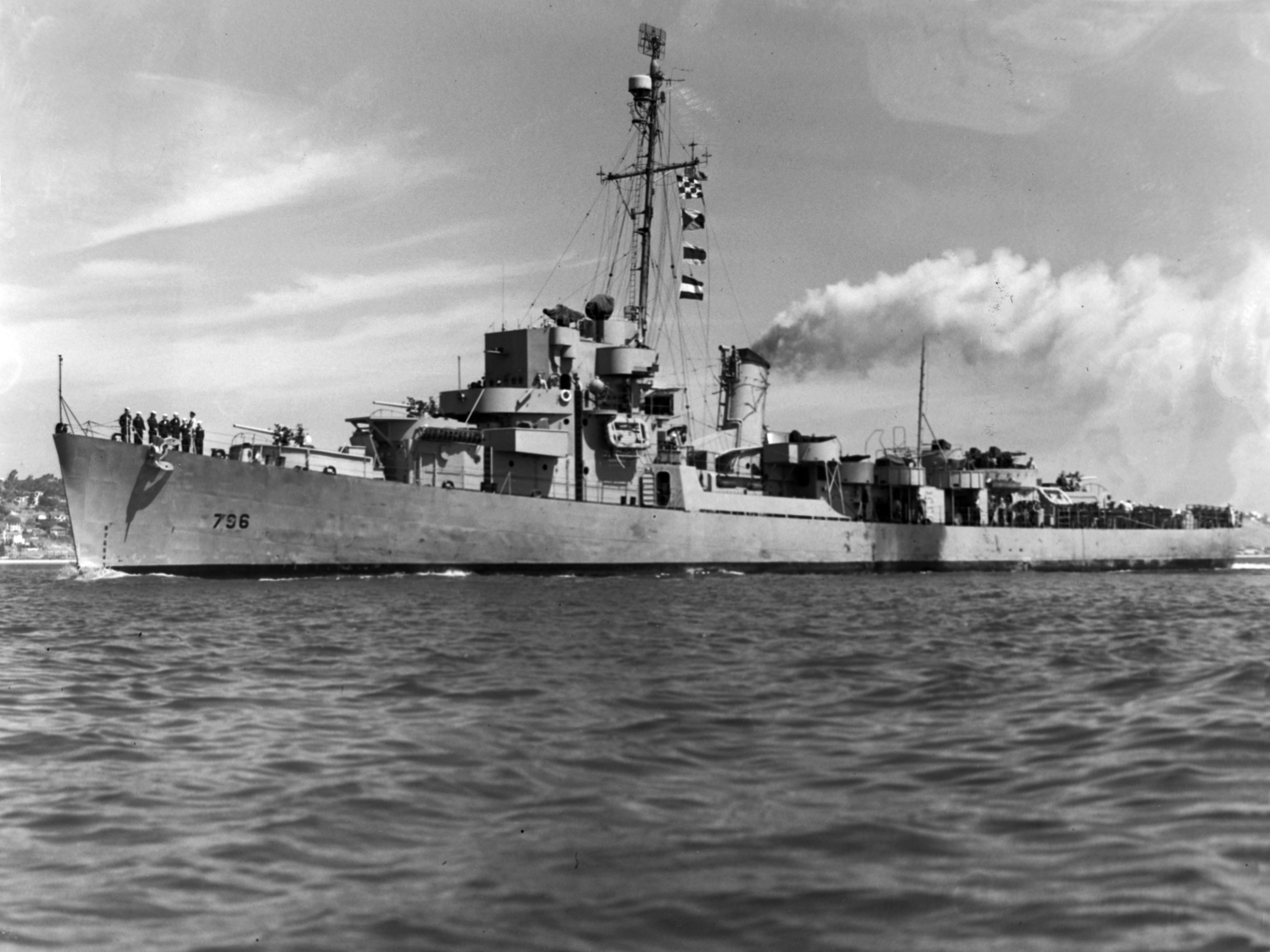

History
- Builder: Consolidated Steel Corp., Orange, Texas
- Laid down: 16 August 1943
- Launched: 23 October 1943
- Sponsored by: Margaret Roper Major
- Commissioned: 12 February 1944
- Decommissioned: 13 March 1948
- Stricken: 1 December 1972
- Fate: Sold for scrapping, 27 November 1973

General characteristics
- Type: Buckley-class destroyer escort
- Displacement: 1,400 tons
- Length: 306 ft (93 m)
- Beam: 36 ft 10 in (11.23 m)
- Draft: 9 ft 5 in (2.87 m)
- Propulsion: 2 "D" Express boilers, G.E. turbines with electric drive, 12000 shp, 2 screws
- Speed: 24 kn
- Range: 4,940 nmi (9,150 km)
- Complement: 186 officers and enlisted
- Armament: 3 × 3 in (76 mm) Mk22 (1×3), 1 × 1.1"/75 caliber gun Mk2 quad AA (4×1), 8 × 20 mm Mk 4 AA, 3 × 21 inch (533 mm) Mk15 TT (3×1), 1 Hedgehog Projector Mk10 (144 rounds), 8 Mk6 K-gun depth charge projectors, 2 Mk9 depth charge tracks

USS Major (DE-796) was a Buckley-class destroyer escort in service with the United States Navy from 1944 to 1948. She was scrapped in 1973.

== History ==
USS Major was named after Charles Nance Major, who died when the ship on which he was serving as armed guard, the SS R. P. Resor, was torpedoed off Manasquan, New Jersey, by U-578 late 26 February 1942.

Major (DE-796) was laid down by Consolidated Steel Corp., Orange, Texas, 16 August 1943; launched 23 October 1943; sponsored by Ens. Margaret Roper Major, Ensign Major's widow; and was commissioned at Orange, Texas, 12 February 1944.

=== Battle of the Atlantic ===
Following her shakedown cruise off Bermuda, Major served in the Caribbean Sea frontier and escorted convoys between Cuba and Trinidad until she arrived at Boston, Massachusetts on 11 June. She underwent training out of Casco Bay, Maine, with ships of Escort Division 56 before she subsequently arrived at Yorktown, Virginia on 2 July for convoy escort duty. On 4 July, she sailed as part of Task Force 61 and escorted UGS-47, a 68 ship convoy, to Bizerte, Tunisia, where she arrived 23 July. Between 30 July and 18 August she escorted a westbound convoy back to the United States.

Major again sailed with Task Force 61 as convoy escort 12 September, but on the 25th she left UGS-54 and steamed to Plymouth, England, where she arrived on 29 September. There she met a convoy of 18 LSTs and 20 LCIs, and between 5 and 24 October she sailed as escort to Charleston, South Carolina. During the next 2 months Major made another convoy run to North Africa and back; and, after she returned to Boston 29 December, she served as a submarine training target ship out of New London, Connecticut. Thence she sailed 21 February 1945 for duty in the Pacific.

=== Pacific War ===
After she arrived at Manus, Admiralties, 1 April, Major escorted a convoy from Hollandia, New Guinea, to Leyte Gulf, Philippines, where she reported for duty with the Philippine Sea frontier. During the remainder of the war she operated out of Leyte Gulf, where she patrolled for enemy submarines, provided passenger and mail service to islands in the southern Philippines, and conducted periodic convoy escort duty, including a run to New Guinea and back. Late in July she reached Okinawa as an escort for an LST convoy, thence she departed 1 August guarding LSTs bound for Leyte. Three days later, as Earl V. Johnson (DE-702) dueled with a Japanese submarine, Major protected the convoy, which arrived at Leyte Gulf 7 August.

Following the cessation of hostilities 15 August, Major steamed to Manila 18 August and escorted LSTs to Japan. She anchored near mighty Missouri (BB-63) in Tokyo Bay 1 September and the following day witnessed the Japanese surrender on board the giant battleship. After returning to the Philippines later that month, she operated out of Leyte.

=== Decommissioning and fate ===
Late in 1945 she steamed to the U.S. West Coast. Major decommissioned at Long Beach, California, 13 March 1948 and entered the Pacific Reserve Fleet berthed with the Pacific Inactive Fleet at Stockton, California. Major was sold for scrapping 27 November 1973.
