= USS Jordan =

Buckley-class destroyer escort

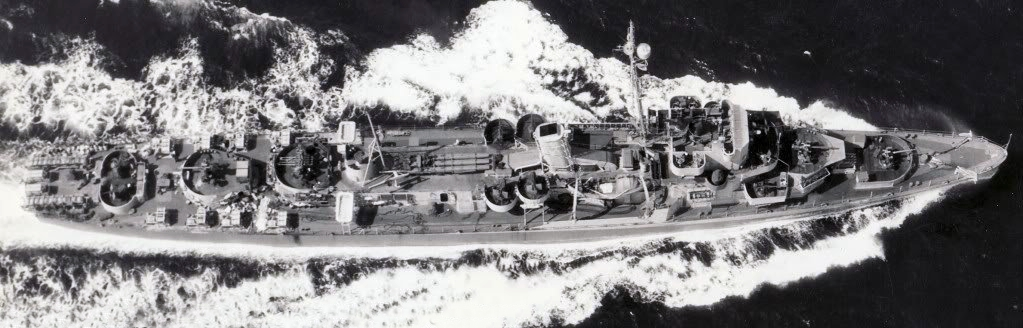

History

United States
- Name: USS Jordan
- Namesake: Julian Bethune Jordan
- Ordered: 1942
- Builder: Charleston Navy Yard
- Laid down: 5 June 1943
- Launched: 23 August 1943
- Commissioned: 17 December 1943
- Decommissioned: 19 December 1945
- Stricken: 8 January 1946
- Honors and awards: 4 battle stars (World War II)
- Fate: Sold for scrap, July 1947

General characteristics
- Class & type: Buckley-class destroyer escort
- Displacement: 1,400 long tons (1,422 t) light; 1,740 long tons (1,768 t) standard
- Length: 306 ft (93 m)
- Beam: 37 ft (11 m)
- Draft: 9 ft 6 in (2.90 m) standard; 11 ft 3 in (3.43 m) full load
- Propulsion: 2 × boilers; General Electric turbo-electric drive; 12,000 shp (8.9 MW); 2 × solid manganese-bronze 3,600 lb (1,600 kg) 3-bladed propellers, 8 ft 6 in (2.59 m) diameter, 7 ft 7 in (2.31 m) pitch; 2 × rudders; 359 tons fuel oil
- Speed: 23 knots (43 km/h; 26 mph)
- Range: 3,700 nmi (6,900 km) at 15 kn (28 km/h; 17 mph); 6,000 nmi (11,000 km) at 12 kn (22 km/h; 14 mph)
- Complement: 15 officers, 198 men
- Armament: 3 × 3-inch/50-caliber guns; 1 × quad 1.1-inch/75-caliber gun; 8 × single 20 mm guns; 1 × triple 21 inch (533 mm) torpedo tubes; 1 × Hedgehog anti-submarine mortar; 8 × K-gun depth charge projectors; 2 × depth charge tracks

USS Jordan (DE-204) was a Buckley-class destroyer escort in service with the United States Navy from 1943 to 1945. Following a collision with a merchant vessel, she was not repaired and scrapped in 1947.

== History ==
USS Jordan was named in honor of Lieutenant Julian Bethune Jordan (1904–1941), who was killed in action aboard USS Oklahoma during the Japanese attack on Pearl Harbor on 7 December 1941.

Jordan was laid down on 5 June 1943 by the Charleston Navy Yard; launched on 23 August 1943; sponsored by Mrs. Lucy H. Jordan, widow of Lieutenant Jordan; commissioned on 17 December 1943.

After shakedown, Jordan arrived New York in mid-March 1944 for duty as convoy escort. She sailed on 17 April with a convoy bound for Gibraltar, arriving there on 1 May with transports carrying vital cargo for the operations in the Mediterranean area. She returned to New York later that month and made one more European voyage in June before beginning duty as a training ship. During July and August, she engaged in training exercises at Quonset Point, Rhode Island, and arrived Port Everglades, Florida, on 17 September to commence experimental exercises in that area.

After a yard period at Charleston Navy Yard, Jordan resumed sound experiments out of Port Everglades in early 1945. During May, she was deployed on another cruise to the Mediterranean as convoy escort, returning to New York on 10 June. She engaged in submarine operations out of New London, Connecticut, and training exercises in Cuba, throughout the summer. It was through these experiments that new technological advancements in anti-submarine warfare were adopted, leading to a more powerful navy and a shorter war.

While on a training mission on 18 September, Jordan collided with a merchant vessel, SS John Sherman, necessitating immediate repairs. She arrived Charleston on 4 October and remained there until she decommissioned on 19 December 1945. The ship was scrapped in 1947.
