= USS Jack W. Wilke =

Buckley-class destroyer escort of the United States Navy

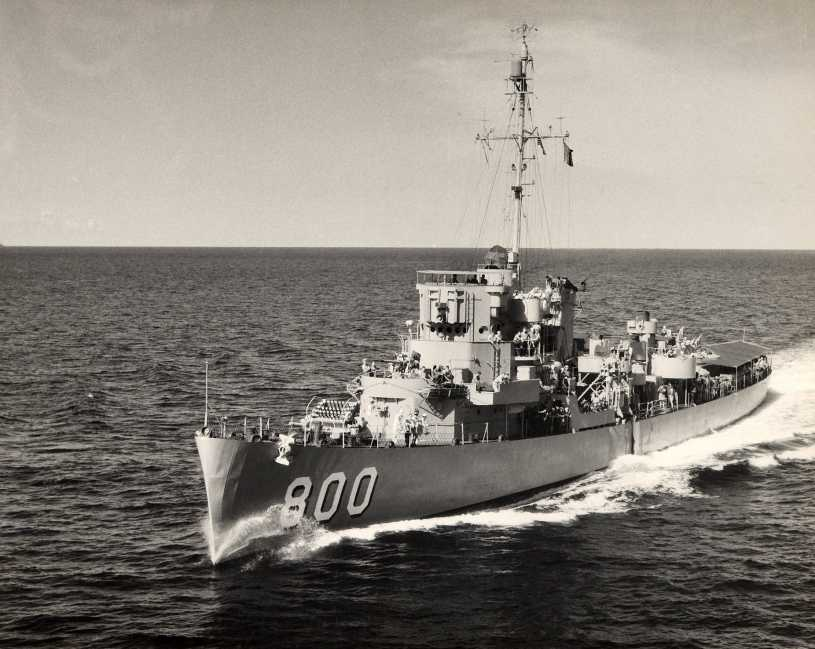

History

United States
- Laid down: 18 October 1943
- Launched: 18 December 1943
- Commissioned: 7 March 1944
- Decommissioned: 24 May 1960
- Stricken: 1 August 1972
- Fate: Sold for scrap, 4 March 1974

General characteristics
- Displacement: 1,740 tons full; 1,400 tons, standard
- Length: 306 ft 0 in (93 m)
- Beam: 36 ft 9 in (11.20 m)
- Draft: 13 ft 6 in (4.11 m)
- Propulsion: GE turbo-electric drive; 12,000 shp (8.9 MW); two propellers
- Speed: 24 knots (44 km/h)
- Range: 4,940 nautical miles (9,150 km) at 12 knots (22 km/h)
- Complement: 15 officers, 198 men
- Armament: 3 × 3 in (76 mm) DP guns; 3 × 21 in (53 cm) torpedo tubes; 1 × 1.1 in (28 mm) quad AA gun; 8 × 20 mm cannon; 1 × hedgehog projector; 2 × depth charge tracks; 8 × K-gun depth charge projectors

USS Jack W. Wilke (DE-800) was a Buckley-class destroyer escort of the United States Navy.

== Construction and commissioning ==
Named for Jack W. Wilke, a naval aviator killed at the Battle of Midway in May 1942, the new destroyer escort was built at the Consolidated Steel Corp. shipyard in Orange, Texas. She was launched on, 18 December 1943, sponsored by Mrs. Joe H. Wilke, mother of Wilke. Jack W. Wilke was commissioned 7 March 1944.

After a shakedown to the West Indies and antisubmarine warfare (ASW) training at Bermuda, Jack W. Wilke spent six months on Atlantic convoy escort duty. The escort covered several convoys from American ports to the Mediterranean in the summer of 1944, making stops at Oran, Algeria; Bizerte, Tunis; Palermo, Sicily; and Naples, Italy. Later in the year, the warship escorted a convoy directly to Cherbourg, France. That last convoy escort mission was particularly nerve-racking owing to the late war German U-boat offensive in British waters. Following intelligence indications that next generation U-boats were planning to return to the western Atlantic, Wilke operated with a hunter-killer group in the Newfoundland–Nova Scotia area from December 1944 to May 1945. Upon the surrender of Germany, she moved to Norfolk to serve as a weather reporting and air-sea rescue vessel.

Jack W. Wilke sailed 4 June 1945 for Miami and operated as a sonar training ship there until 18 July. The warship then shifted to Philadelphia for an overhaul (and the installation of more anti-aircraft guns and improved sonar gear) in preparation for operations in the Pacific. With that mission cancelled by the end of the war in August 1945, the escort sailed to Port Everglades, Florida for three weeks of experimental ASW exercises. In September, she underwent a three-month overhaul at New York Navy Yard in preparation for her new role as an experimental antisubmarine ship. Jack W. Wilke sailed back to Florida on 7 January 1946 to commence operations out of Key West. During the years that followed, she carried out experiments in both tactics and sound equipment off Key West and during occasional cruises in the West Indies.

The ship's schedule of experimental operations was interrupted on New Year's Day 1959 by the triumph of Fidel Castro's forces in Cuba; and Jack W. Wilke steamed to Havana with other ships to help stabilize the situation and to protect American lives and property. During the remainder of the year, she operated off Key West and Norfolk on training operations, and took part in a special good-will cruise to Panama in October during a Caribbean training period.

Returning to Key West, the ship decommissioned 24 May 1960, and entered the Atlantic Reserve Fleet at Philadelphia. The old escort was struck from the Navy list on 1 August 1972 and later sold for scrap to Union Metals & Alloys Corp., New York, on 4 March 1974.
