= USS Greenwood =

Buckley-class destroyer escort

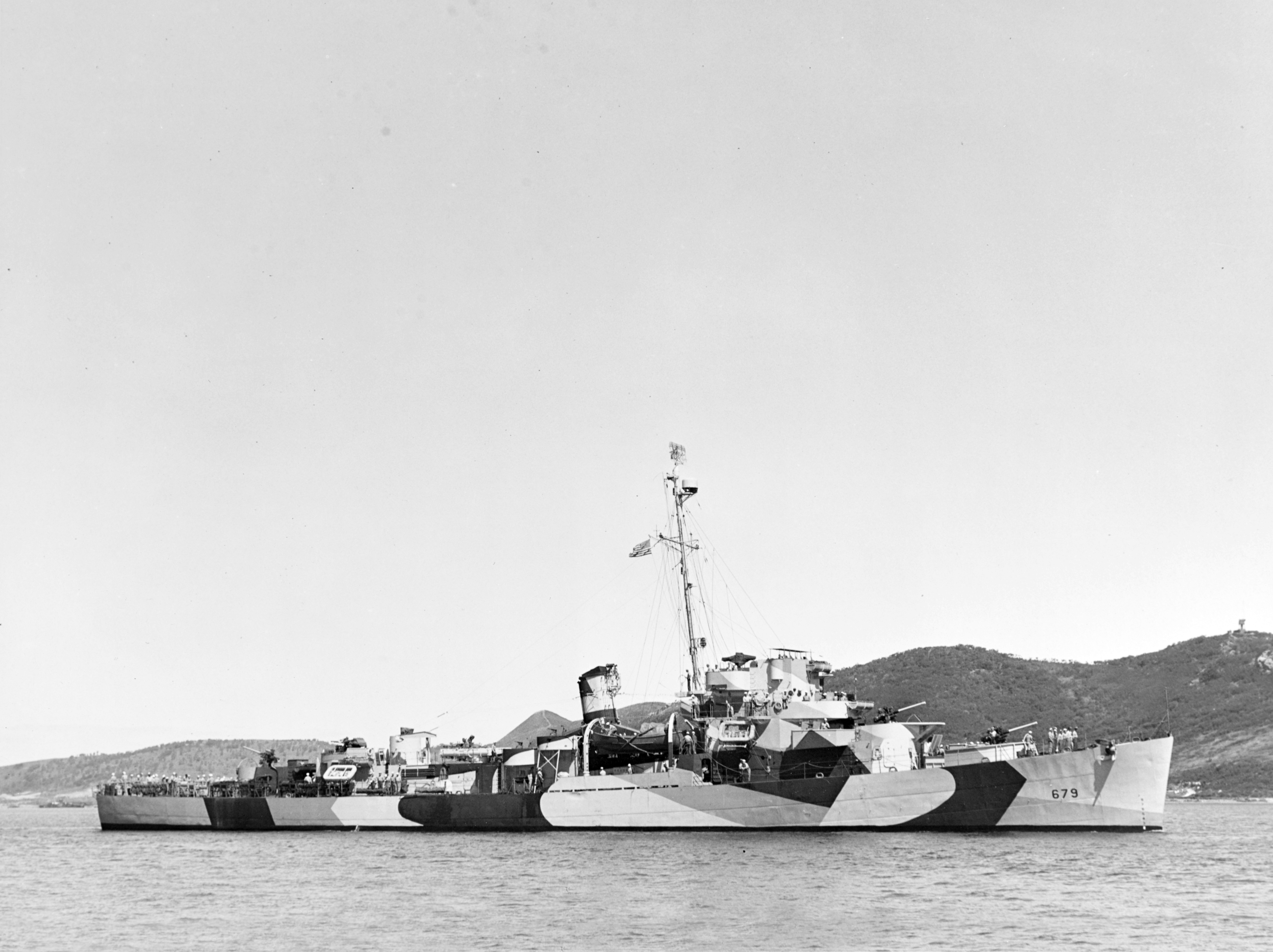

History

United States
- Builder: Fore River Shipyard, Quincy, Massachusetts
- Laid down: 29 June 1943
- Launched: 21 August 1943
- Commissioned: 25 September 1943
- Decommissioned: 1 August 1962
- Stricken: 20 February 1967
- Fate: Sold for scrap, 6 September 1967

General characteristics
- Displacement: 1,740 tons full; 1,400 tons, standard
- Length: 306 ft 0 in (93 m)
- Beam: 36 ft 9 in (11.20 m)
- Draft: 13 ft 6 in (4.11 m)
- Propulsion: GE turbo-electric drive; 12,000 shp (8.9 MW); two propellers
- Speed: 24 knots (44 km/h)
- Range: 4,940 nautical miles (9,150 km) at 12 knots (22 km/h)
- Complement: 15 officers, 198 men
- Armament: 3 × 3 in (76 mm) DP guns; 3 × 21 in (53 cm) torpedo tubes; 1 × 1.1 in (28 mm) quad AA gun; 8 × 20 mm cannon; 1 × hedgehog projector; 2 × depth charge tracks; 8 × K-gun depth charge projectors

USS Greenwood (DE-679) was a Buckley-class destroyer escort in service with the United States Navy from 1943 to 1962. She was scrapped in 1968.

Frank Greenwood, the ship's namesake, was a naval officer killed aboard the gunboat USS Erie when it was torpedoed while on convoy duty in the Caribbean.

== History ==
=== World War II ===
Greenwood was launched by the Fore River Shipyard, Quincy, Massachusetts, on 21 August 1943; sponsored by Mrs. Laura Greenwood, mother of Lt. (j.g.) Greenwood; and commissioned on 25 September 1943.

Greenwood sailed for the Pacific 29 November 1943, reaching Samoa, via the Panama Canal 26 December. She spent nearly a year in the South Pacific escorting transports and cargo ships through the New Hebrides and the Solomons, with side trips to Australia. On 30 December 1944 Greenwood sailed from New Guinea to join Admiral Thomas C. Kinkaid's 7th Fleet at Leyte Gulf. After escorting 26 merchantmen and LSTs to the Philippines and screening them while there, Greenwood sailed for Ulithi. There she picked up a convoy of supply and troop ships bound for Iwo Jima, still the scene of bloody battle, and sailed 5 March. Departing the Iwo Jima area 27 March, Greenwood sailed to Eniwetok, where she conducted submarine and anti-submarine training exercises.

After war's end, Greenwood sailed for a much-needed overhaul at Mare Island Naval Shipyard, and on 4 September 1945 steamed under the Golden Gate Bridge to end 22 months continuous service in the Pacific.

=== Cold War ===
Following overhaul, Greenwood sailed for the East Coast via Panama on 2 January 1946. After exercises with the Atlantic Fleet at Panama, she continued to New London, Conn., arriving 10 April. The following three years saw Greenwood functioning as an escort along the East Coast from Maine to Key West. On 2 May 1949 she reported at Key West for duty as school ship for the Fleet Sonar School, and remained in that useful service for nearly six years. After tours of escort duty at Norfolk, Va. and Newport, R.I., 1954 through 1957, Greenwood returned to Key West in July 1957. Six months later she was designated Selected Reserve Training Ship for the 6th Naval District, based at Charleston, S.C.

Placed out of commission in service 2 September 1958, Greenwood served as a reserve training ship until 2 October 1961, when she recommissioned in response to the renewed Berlin crisis. After training along the coast, she reported to Key West for further duty with the Fleet Sonar School on 7 January 1962. As world tension eased, Greenwood decommissioned again 1 August 1962 but again stayed in service. Operating out of St. Petersburg, Florida, she continued to conduct reserve training cruises designed to keep the Navy's fighting strength and potential at their peak through the next five years.

=== Decommissioning and fate ===
Greenwood was placed out of service and struck from the Navy List on 20 February 1967. She was sold for scrapping on 6 September 1967 to the Lipsett Company (New York City) and was broken up at Kearny, New Jersey (USA).

== Awards ==
Greenwood received 2 battle stars for World War II service.
