= USS Lloyd =

Buckley-class destroyer escort

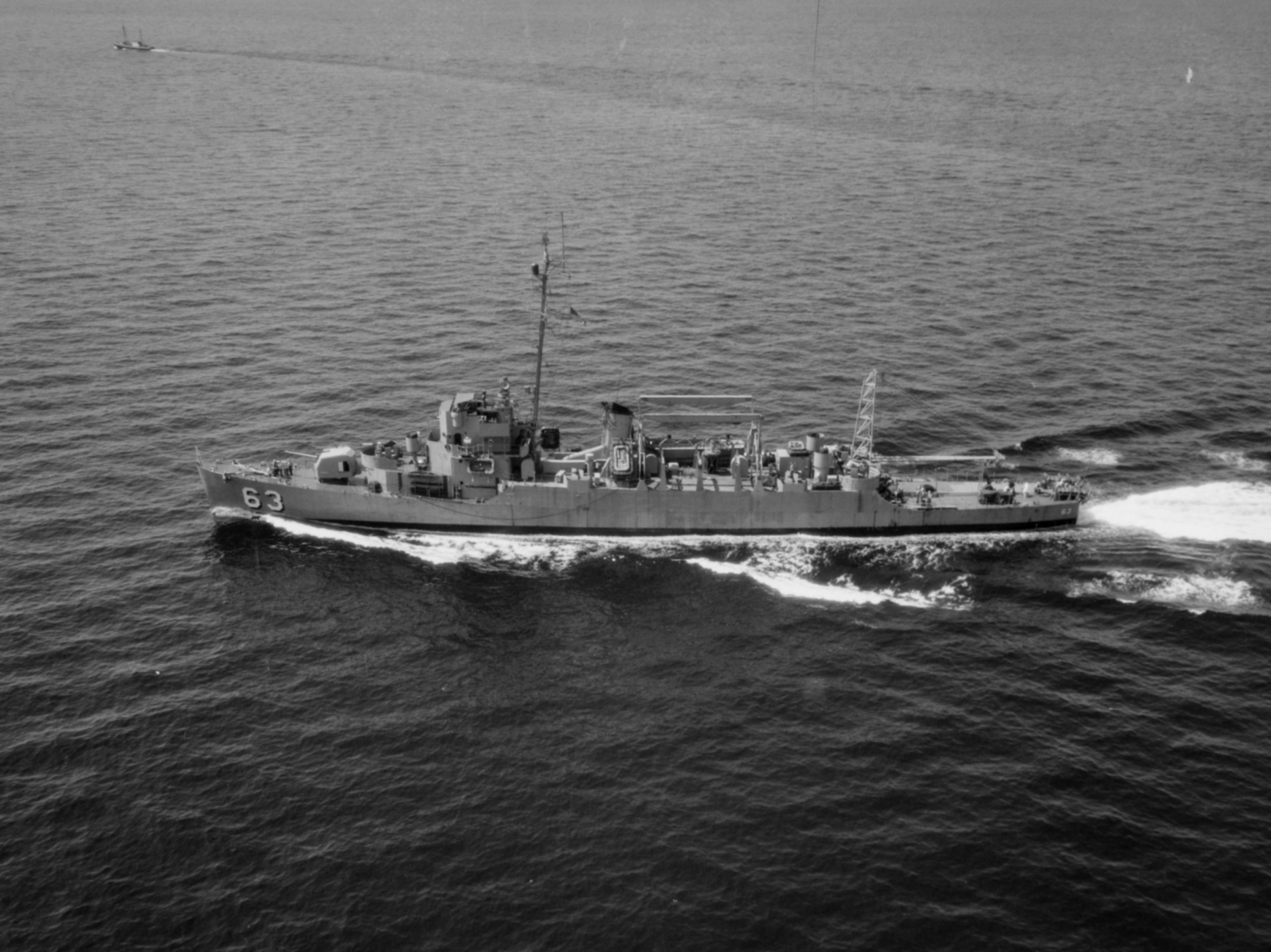
- USS Lloyd on 5 July 1951

History

United States
- Name: USS Lloyd
- Namesake: William R. Lloyd
- Ordered: 1942
- Builder: Charleston Navy Yard
- Laid down: 26 July 1943
- Launched: 23 October 1943
- Commissioned: 11 February 1944
- Decommissioned: 1 July 1946
- Reclassified: APD-63, 5 July 1944
- Recommissioned: 3 January 1951
- Decommissioned: 18 February 1958
- Stricken: 1 June 1966
- Honors and awards: 8 battle stars (World War II)
- Fate: Sold for scrap, 5 March 1968

General characteristics
- Class & type: Buckley-class destroyer escort
- Displacement: 1,400 long tons (1,422 t) light; 1,740 long tons (1,768 t) standard
- Length: 306 ft (93 m)
- Beam: 37 ft (11 m)
- Draft: 9 ft 6 in (2.90 m) standard; 11 ft 3 in (3.43 m) full load
- Propulsion: 2 × boilers; General Electric turbo-electric drive; 12,000 shp (8.9 MW); 2 × solid manganese-bronze 3,600 lb (1,600 kg) 3-bladed propellers, 8 ft 6 in (2.59 m) diameter, 7 ft 7 in (2.31 m) pitch; 2 × rudders; 359 tons fuel oil
- Speed: 23 knots (43 km/h; 26 mph)
- Range: 3,700 nmi (6,900 km) at 15 kn (28 km/h; 17 mph); 6,000 nmi (11,000 km) at 12 kn (22 km/h; 14 mph)
- Complement: 15 officers, 198 men
- Armament: 3 × 3"/50 caliber guns; 1 × quad 1.1"/75 caliber gun; 8 × single 20 mm guns; 1 × triple 21 inch (533 mm) torpedo tubes; 1 × Hedgehog anti-submarine mortar; 8 × K-gun depth charge projectors; 2 × depth charge tracks

USS Lloyd (DE-209/APD-63), a Buckley-class destroyer escort of the United States Navy, was named in honor of Ensign William R. Lloyd (1916–1942).

== Namesake ==
William Rees Lloyd was born on 23 September 1916 in Monticello, Florida. He enlisted in the United States Navy on 9 October 1940. He was appointed midshipman on 15 December 1940 and commissioned Ensign on 14 March 1941. He served briefly aboard USS Luzon, then reported to USS Oahu on 26 September 1941. He was killed in action on 6 May 1942 when Oahu was sunk at Corregidor at the close of the Battle of Corregidor. He was posthumously awarded the Navy Cross.

== Construction and commissioning ==
Lloyd was laid down on 26 July 1943 by the Charleston Navy Yard, launched on 23 November 1943; sponsored by Mrs. Ella Lee Lloyd, mother of Ensign Lloyd; and commissioned on 11 February 1944.

== Service history ==
=== World War II, 1944–1946 ===
After shakedown off Bermuda, the new destroyer escort left Norfolk, Virginia on 12 May 1944 with 13 other destroyer escorts and a convoy of 100 transport ships bound for North Africa. The British relieved the escort ships at Bizerte, Tunisia, on 1 June; nine days later Lloyd and her sister ships departed to escort another convoy on the westward passage home. While en route, Lloyd was reclassified APD-63 on 5 July 1944 and ordered to report to the Philadelphia Navy Yard on 29 June for conversion to a Charles Lawrence-class high speed transport.

Three months later, after conversion and shakedown, Lloyd steamed for the Pacific War zones, touched Bora Bora, Society Islands, on 20 October, and arrived Hollandia, New Guinea, on 4 November. Soon thereafter she became the permanent flagship for Transport Division 103.

Moving to Leyte on 23 November, for the next five months Lloyd transported invasion troops, as the Allies completed the Philippine liberation. In her first action on 7 December, the new transport ship landed troops at Ormoc on the western coast of Leyte. Ten days later he took part in the daring strike at Mindoro, the Japanese held island 500 miles northwest of Leyte. After Mindoro, she steamed via Lingayen to Hollandia to embark troops for the assault at Lingayen Gulf in northern Luzon. Departing New Guinea on 4 January 1945, she landed her troops at Lingayen a week later. That afternoon, the transport's guns knocked out an enemy shore battery. The next day Lloyd departed and fought her way back to Leyte, splashing four enemy suicide planes during the three-day passage.

During February the ship took part in the assaults on San Felipe and Subic Bay. On the 28th, she brought troops from Mindoro to help liberate the Island of Palawan, a vital stepping stone to Borneo. Another gateway to Borneo, Mindanao, ignored as the Navy leapfrogged to Leyte and Luzon, now had to be secured. Jumping off from Mindoro 8 March, two days later, Lloyd put troops ashore to liberate Zamboanga on the westernmost tip of Mindanao, then steamed to Leyte that evening.

Following repairs and patrol duty off Leyte during April, the ship shifted operations to Morotai on 7 May to participate in the liberation of Borneo. From 28 May to 19 June, she assisted the amphibious forces landing at Brunei Bay on the western coast of Borneo. During early July, Lloyd twice ferried reinforcements from Morotai to the landings at Balikpapan on the eastern coast.

In the last weeks of the war, the ship trained Army troops in amphibious warfare, then after V-J Day, transported occupation units from Okinawa to Korea. She departed Okinawa for Pearl Harbor on 26 November 1945, en route to the east coast to join the Atlantic Reserve Fleet. She reached the Brooklyn Navy Yard on 2 January 1946. Following a month in drydock, she steamed to Green Cove Springs, Florida, and decommissioned there on 1 July 1946.

=== Korean War, 1951–1953 ===
Under the demands of the Korean War, Lloyd recommissioned on 3 January 1951. After shakedown in Chesapeake Bay and availability at the Boston Naval Shipyard, she reported to the Naval Amphibious Base Little Creek, Virginia, on 26 September for local training duty. From April through October she operated with the 6th Fleet in the Mediterranean.

=== Atlantic coast, 1953–1958 ===
From 1953 through 1957 the high speed transport continued to operate with the Marines out of Little Creek, VA. During this period she often operated in the Caribbean and visited most of the ports along the eastern seaboard. During this same period she also carried UDT (Underwater Demolition Teams) on demolition and retrieval exercises. She also participated in many ASW (Anti-Submarine Warfare) exercises in concert with U.S. submarines; during these exercises she operated as a team with U.S. Coast Guard ships during the submarine chasing. The Lloyd was also deployed with a small group of other ships to the Suez Canal during the Suez crisis – the group was recalled back to port after about 2 days at sea and never got to the Canal.

=== Decommissioning and sale ===
Lloyd decommissioned on 18 February 1958 at Charleston, South Carolina, and rejoined the Atlantic Reserve Fleet. She was struck from the Navy List on 1 June 1966 and sold for scrap.
