= USS Henry R. Kenyon =

Buckley-class destroyer escort

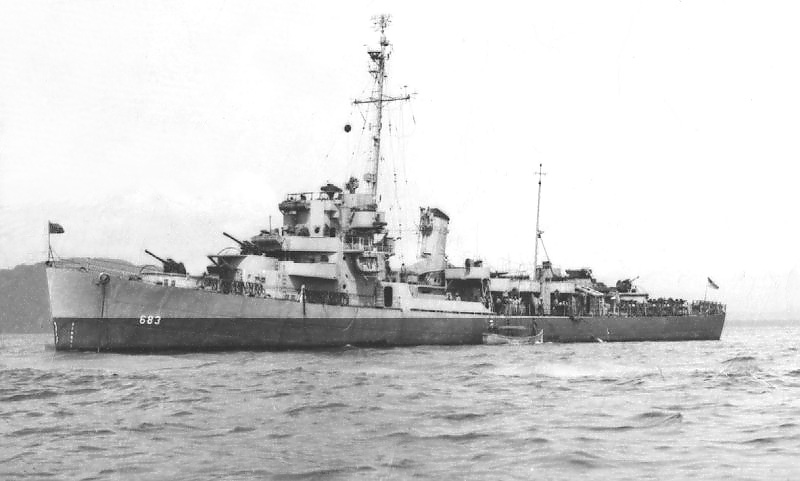
- USS Henry R. Kenyon (DE-683)

History

United States
- Name: USS Henry R. Kenyon
- Builder: Fore River Shipyard, Quincy, Massachusetts
- Laid down: 29 September 1943
- Launched: 30 October 1943
- Commissioned: 30 November 1943
- Decommissioned: 3 February 1947
- Stricken: 1 December 1969
- Fate: Sold for scrap, 22 October 1970

General characteristics
- Displacement: 1,740 tons full; 1,400 tons, standard
- Length: 306 ft (93 m)
- Beam: 36 ft 9 in (11.20 m)
- Draft: 13 ft 6 in (4.11 m)
- Propulsion: GE turbo-electric drive, 12,000 hp (8.9 MW); two propellers
- Speed: 23 knots (43 km/h)
- Range: 4,940 nautical miles at 12 knots; (9,200 km at 22 km/h)
- Complement: 15 officers, 198 men
- Armament: 3 × 3 in (76 mm) DP guns, 3 × 21 in (53 cm) torpedo tubes, 1 × 1.1 in (28 mm) quad AA gun, 8 × 20 mm AA cannon, 1 × hedgehog projector, 2 × depth charge tracks, 8 × K-gun depth charge projectors

USS Henry R. Kenyon (DE-683) was a Buckley-class destroyer escort in service with the United States Navy from 1943 to 1947. She was sold for scrap in 1970.

The ship was named in honor of Ensign Henry R. Kenyon Jr. (1916–1942), a naval aviator in Torpedo Squadron 8 (VT-8) who was killed in action in the Battle of Midway.

== History ==
Henry R. Kenyon was launched by Bethlehem Steel Co.'s Fore River Shipyard, Quincy, Massachusetts, on 30 October 1943; sponsored by Mrs. Verna Markham Kenyon, widow; and commissioned on 30 November 1943.

=== Battle of the Atlantic ===
After her shakedown cruise off Bermuda, Henry R. Kenyon returned to Boston. She was underway on 26 January 1944 on a tour of convoy escort duty in the Caribbean, a fertile field for German submarines. Returning to Boston again on 6 June, the ship underwent training in Casco Bay, Maine, and had her torpedo tubes replaced by additional antiaircraft guns. Assigned to an Atlantic escort group, she made five transatlantic voyages between 4 July 1944 and 30 August 1945, providing antisubmarine and antiaircraft protection in the Atlantic and eastern Mediterranean.

=== Pacific War ===
With the Battle of the Atlantic won, the destroyer escort proceeded on 15 May from Norfolk, Virginia through the Panama Canal and into the western Pacific theater. Arriving off Leyte on 7 July, she spent the remainder of the war escorting ships in the Philippines and to New Guinea and Okinawa. After the surrender of Japan in August, Henry R. Kenyon continued to operate in the Philippines and off the coast of Japan until departing Manila for the United States on 26 November.

Arriving at San Diego, California on 17 December, she remained in that port except for periodic training cruises until decommissioning on 3 February 1947. She joined the Pacific Reserve Fleet and berthed at Mare Island, Calif., later to be moved to Stockton, Calif.

=== Fate ===
Henry R. Kenyon was stricken from the Navy Register on 1 December 1969. The ship was sold for scrap on 22 October 1970.
