= USS Gunason =

Buckley-class destroyer escort

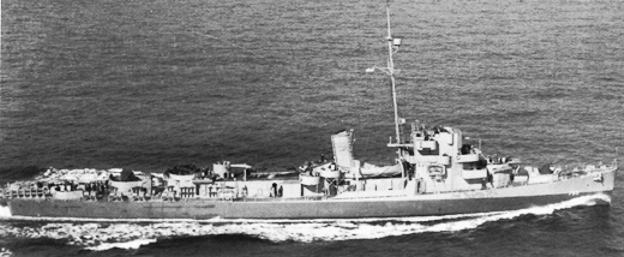

History

United States
- Name: USS Gunason
- Namesake: Lt. Robert W. Gunason
- Builder: Consolidated Steel Corporation
- Laid down: 9 August 1943
- Launched: 16 October 1943
- Commissioned: 1 February 1944
- Decommissioned: 13 November 1948
- Stricken: 1 September 1973
- Identification: Hull symbol:DE-795; Code letters:NZCC
- Fate: Sunk as target 28 July 1973

General characteristics
- Class & type: Buckley-class destroyer escort
- Displacement: 1,400 to 1,740 tons full load
- Length: 306 ft (93 m) oa
- Beam: 36 ft (11 m)
- Draft: 9.6 ft (2.9 m)
- Propulsion: 2 × "D" Express boilers; 2 × Electric turbines; 2 × Screws; 12,000 shp (8,900 kW)
- Speed: 24 + Knots (44.4 km/h)
- Range: 4,940 nm
- Complement: Officers: 15; Enlisted: 198
- Armament: 1 × 1.1"/75 caliber gun Mk2 quad AA; 3 × 3 in (76 mm) Mk22; 8 × 20 mm Mk 4 AA; 3 × 21-inch (533 mm) Mk15 TT; 1 × Hedgehog Projector Mk10; 8 × Mk6 depth charge projectors; 2 × Mk9 depth charge tracks

USS Gunason (DE-795) a Buckley-class destroyer escort of the United States Navy, was named in honor of Lieutenant Robert W. Gunason who was killed in action while serving on USS Astoria during the Battle of Savo Island.

Gunason was launched 16 October 1943 by the Consolidated Steel Corp., Orange, Texas; sponsored by Mrs. Mabel Meneley, the namesake's mother; and commissioned 1 February 1944.

== History ==
After shakedown, Gunason sailed from Boston 6 April 1944 for the Caribbean, reaching Trinidad four days later, and began inter-island escort duties. Until June she made frequent escort voyages between Trinidad and Guantanamo Bay, Cuba, delivering her convoys safely. Departing Trinidad on 2 June, she rendezvoused at Barbados with a merchantman carrying one of the first loads of Barbadians to the United States to relieve the wartime farm labor shortage, and escorted the ship safely to Miami.

Subsequently, following repairs at Boston, Gunason reached Casco Bay, Maine on 25 June and joined sister destroyer escorts bound for Hampton Roads, where all arrived 2 July to form Task Force 61. Gunason served with this task force until early 1945, making three transatlantic escort voyages out of Hampton Roads to Bizerte, Plymouth, and Oran respectively from 4 July 1944 to 8 January 1945. Highlights included herding a stricken slow tow convoy which had been attacked by U-boats. Gunason spent Christmas and New Year's standing by this convoy as it steamed into winter seas at 4 knots (7.4 km/h; 4.6 mph).

Gunason was soon to change her theater of operations. She sailed from Boston on 27 January 1945 for the South Pacific Ocean via the Panama Canal, arriving at Manus on 4 March. A round trip escort voyage thence to Leyte in March set the pattern she was to follow for the next three months—escorting convoys entering and departing Philippine waters—supporting the United States' efforts in the Pacific. In June, Gunason escorted troopships from Hollandia to Manila and after visiting Ulithi, put in at Manila again early in July.

The ship departed Subic Bay on 26 July in company with three destroyer escorts and a flotilla of landing craft bound for Okinawa, arriving nine days later. A pre-dawn air attack on 5 August sent all ships off Hagushi Beach to General Quarters, but Gunason and her charges escaped damage. She returned to Leyte on 8 August and, following an escort voyage thence to Ulithi and return, got underway on 30 August with one of the first Leyte-Tokyo convoys, a flotilla of LCIs that entered Tokyo Bay on 7 September. Gunason sailed the next day for Manila, arriving on 17 September, and remained in the Philippines until November. Duties included a trip to Batan Island with a War Crimes Investigating Detail in which facts, later brought forth in the Yamashita War Crimes Trial, were gleaned. A search mission for a downed plane and a training exercise with submarines in Subic Bay occupied Gunason until 26 November when she stood out of Subic Bay for the United States, arriving at San Diego, California on 17 December 1945. She operated out of there until 10 February 1947 when she sailed for the Far East via Pearl Harbor and Guam. Gunason arrived at Sasebo, Japan on 10 March. She sailed three days later for patrol off the eastern coast of Korea. Gunason remained in this service, with calls at Qingdao and Yokosuka, until 10 September 1947, when she departed for California.

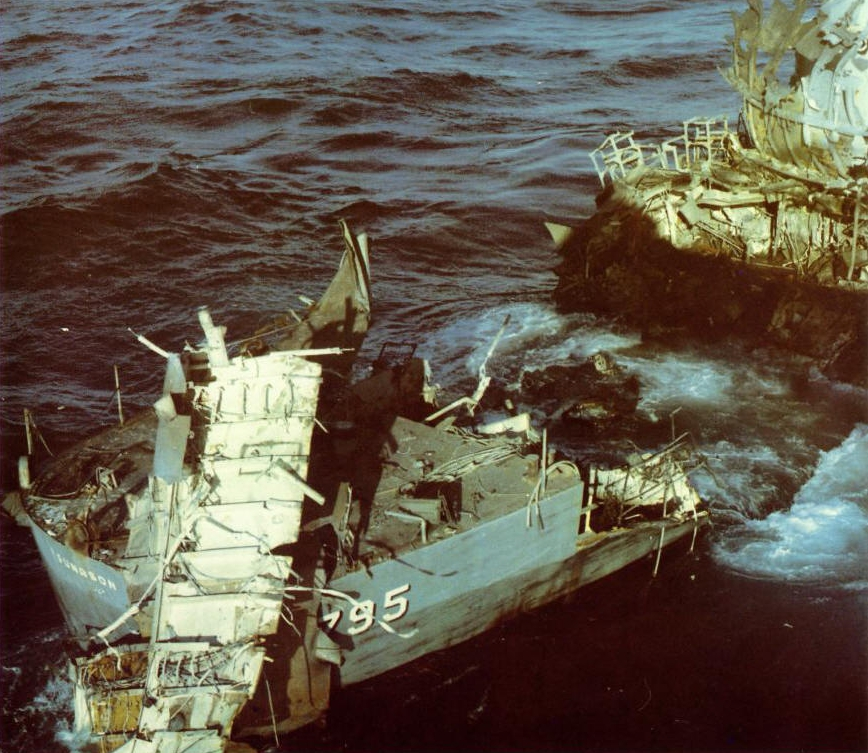
Gunason after being hit by a Harpoon missile, 1973.

Arriving at San Diego on 19 September, Gunason conducted coastal operations until 12 December 1947, when she entered Long Beach for inactivation. Gunason decommissioned on 13 March 1948 and was placed in reserve at Mare Island. In 1969 she was berthed at Stockton, California. In 1973 she was sunk as a target.
