= USS Osmus =

Buckley-class destroyer escort

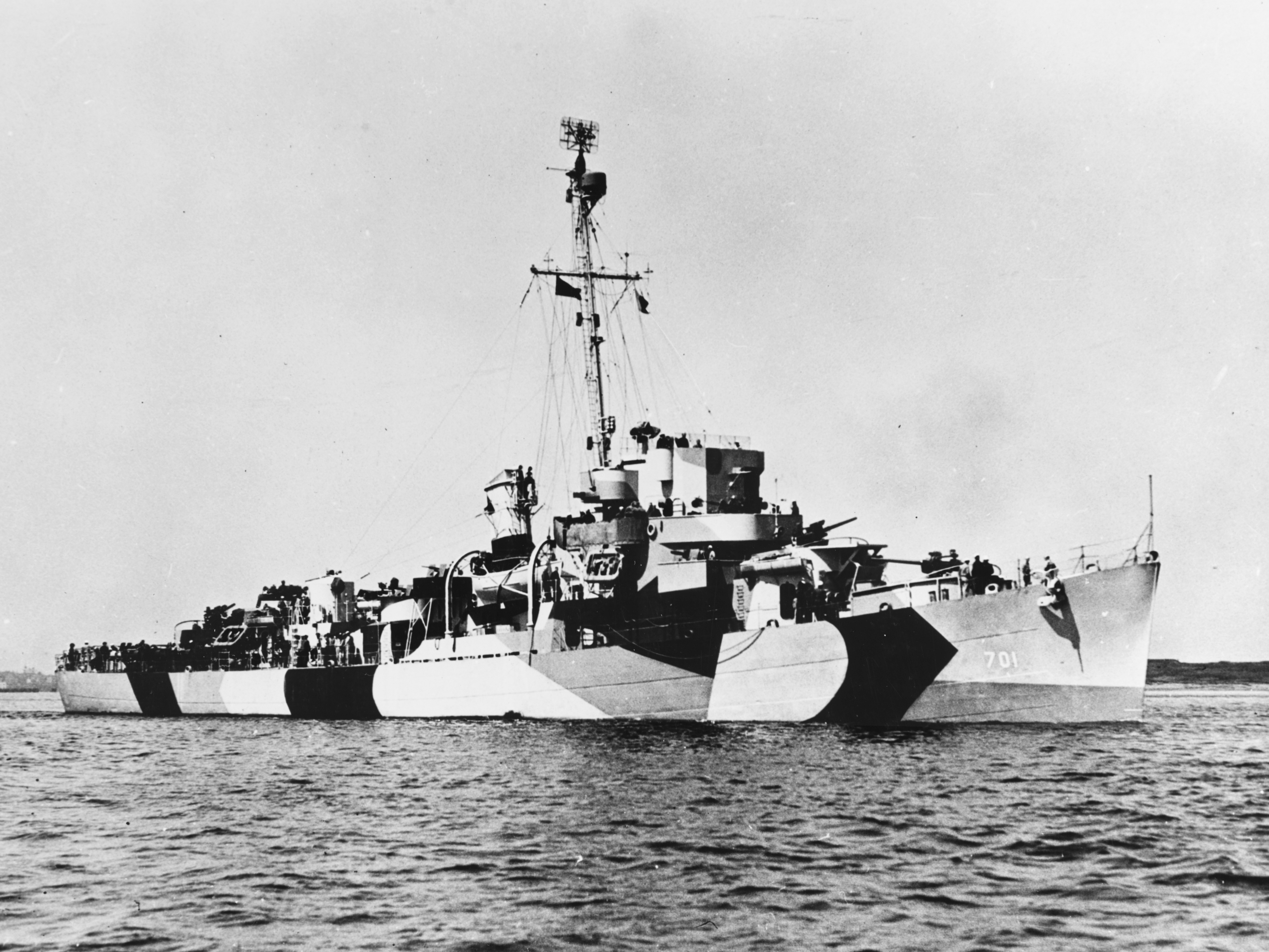
- No Photo Available

History

United States
- Name: USS Osmus
- Ordered: 1942
- Builder: Defoe Shipbuilding Company, Bay City, Michigan
- Laid down: 17 August 1943
- Launched: 4 November 1943
- Commissioned: 23 February 1944
- Decommissioned: 15 March 1947
- Honors and awards: 1 battle star (World War II)
- Fate: Scrapped 1973

General characteristics
- Class & type: Buckley-class destroyer escort
- Displacement: 1,400 long tons (1,422 t) standard; 1,740 long tons (1,768 t) full load
- Length: 306 ft (93 m)
- Beam: 37 ft (11 m)
- Draft: 9 ft 6 in (2.90 m) standard; 11 ft 3 in (3.43 m) full load
- Propulsion: 2 × boilers; General Electric turbo-electric drive; 12,000 shp (8.9 MW); 2 × solid manganese-bronze 3,600 lb (1,600 kg) 3-bladed propellers, 8 ft 6 in (2.59 m) diameter, 7 ft 7 in (2.31 m) pitch; 2 × rudders; 359 tons fuel oil
- Speed: 23 knots (43 km/h; 26 mph)
- Range: 3,700 nmi (6,900 km) at 15 kn (28 km/h; 17 mph); 6,000 nmi (11,000 km) at 12 kn (22 km/h; 14 mph)
- Complement: 15 officers, 198 men
- Armament: 3 × 3"/50 caliber guns; 1 × quad 1.1"/75 caliber gun; 8 × single 20 mm guns; 1 × triple 21-inch (533 mm) torpedo tubes; 1 × Hedgehog anti-submarine mortar; 8 × K-gun depth charge projectors; 2 × depth charge tracks

USS Osmus (DE-701) was a Buckley-class destroyer escort of the United States Navy, named for Wesley Frank Osmus, a Navy aviator posthumously awarded the Navy Cross after his TBD Devastator from USS Yorktown was shot down during the Battle of Midway on 4 June 1942. Research many years later indicated Ensign Osmus survived his plane's ditching but was captured, tortured and executed by the Japanese later that same day.

The ship was laid down at the Defoe Shipbuilding Company, Bay City, Michigan, on 17 August 1943, and launched on 4 November 1943, sponsored by Mrs. Louisa Osmus, mother of Ensign Osmus; and commissioned on 23 February 1944.

== Service history ==
=== World War II, 1944–1945 ===
Following shakedown off Bermuda, Osmus departed the east coast, transited the Panama Canal, and sailed into the Pacific. She arrived at Espiritu Santo on 1 June; and after availability and further training, undertook her first escort mission, to Guadalcanal, on 13 June. On 18 June, she rendezvoused with TU 11.1A, joining CortDiv 39 at the same time. The ships then sailed northwest to the Admiralties. A week later, Osmus was back in the Solomons-New Hebrides area, where she operated as an escort vessel until 10 November.

From the Solomons, Osmus shifted her base of operations to Ulithi and through January 1945, performing escort assignments between the Western Carolines, Admiralties, and Palaus. In early February, she reported to Commander, Guam Patrol and Escort Unit, and for the remainder of the war, escorted vessels amongst the Marianas and to Okinawa, and conducted air-sea rescue missions and anti-submarine warfare patrols in the Marianas. At the end of August, the destroyer escort steamed to Rota for preliminary surrender conferences, and then when to Truk for the official surrender there, on 2 September. Osmus remained as communications vessel at Truk for a week, then sailed back to Guam. On 18 September, she stood out of Apra Harbor for San Pedro, Los Angeles.

=== Post-war activities, 1946–1947 ===
She remained on the west coast until 22 June 1946, when she set a course for the Far East. A month later, she arrived at Tsingtao for a month's China service. At the end of August, she shifted operations to Okinawa, and in October steamed to Korea for customs patrol duty off the American Occupation Zone. Another tour in China followed, and in February 1947, Osmus got underway for the United States. On 2 March, she arrived at San Diego, and on 15 March, she decommissioned and joined the Pacific Reserve Fleet. Into 1970, she remained a unit of that fleet, berthed at Mare Island.

== Awards ==
Osmus received one battle star for her World War II service.
