= USS Alexander J. Luke =

Buckley-class destroyer escort

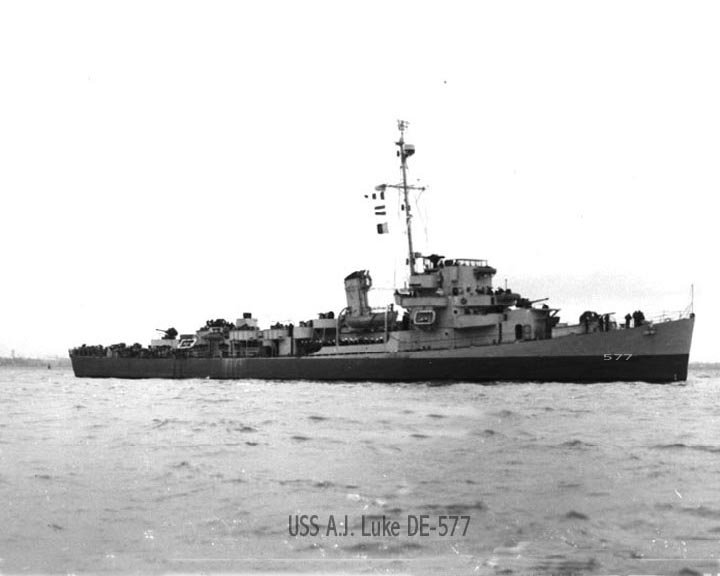
- USS Alexander J. Luke (DE-577)

History

United States
- Ordered: 1942
- Builder: Bethlehem Hingham Shipyard
- Laid down: 5 November 1943
- Launched: 28 December 1943
- Commissioned: 19 February 1944
- Decommissioned: 18 October 1947
- Stricken: 1 May 1970
- Fate: Sunk as target 22 October 1970

General characteristics
- Displacement: 1400 tons standard, 1740 tons full load
- Length: 306 ft (93 m)
- Beam: 37 ft (11.3 m)
- Draft: 9.5 ft (4.1 m) standard, 11.25 ft full load
- Propulsion: 2 boilers, General Electric Turbo-electric drive; 2 solid manganese-bronze 3600 lb 3-bladed propellers; 8.5 ft. diameter, 7 ft 7-inch pitch; 12,000 hp (8.9 MW); 2 rudders
- Speed: 23 knots (43 km/h)
- Range: 359 tons oil; 3700 nm. at 15 knots; 6000 nmi. at 12 knots
- Complement: 15 officers, 198 men
- Armament: 3 × 3 in (76 mm) guns; 4 × 1.1"/75 caliber Anti-Aircraft guns (1x4); 8 × 20 mm; 3 × 21-inch (533 mm) torpedo tubes (1x3); 1 × Hedgehog projector; 8 × depth charge projectors (K-guns); 2 × depth charge tracks

USS Alexander J. Luke (DE/DER-577), a Buckley-class destroyer escort of the United States Navy, was named in honor of Sergeant Alexander J. Luke (1916–1942), who was killed in action during the attack on Tulagi on 6 August 1942. He was posthumously awarded the Silver Star.

== Commissioning and Shakedown ==
Alexander J. Luke was laid down on 5 November 1943 by the Bethlehem Hingham Shipyard, Hingham, Massachusetts; launched on 28 December 1943; sponsored by Catherine B. Luke, mother of Sgt. Luke; and commissioned on 19 February 1944.

== Service history ==
While returning to Boston on 2 March, the destroyer escort ran aground and suffered minor damage. After a period of drydocking for repairs, she got underway on 16 April for a shakedown cruise to Bermuda and returned to Boston on 15 May for post-shakedown availability.

=== 1944 ===
The ship reported to Norfolk, Virginia, in early June and began conducting exercises as a training ship for precommissioning details. On 13 July, Alexander J. Luke sailed as a unit of Escort Division 66 in company with a convoy bound for Bizerte, Tunisia. The ship returned to the Virginia Capes area on 27 August. Following an availability period and training exercises at Boston and Casco Bay, Maine, Alexander J. Luke joined Task Group 62.7 for another voyage to the Mediterranean. She sailed with a convoy to Algeria on 27 September and returned to Boston on 4 November. Upon arriving in Boston, Alexander J. Luke entered drydock. She got underway on 23 November for a period of anti-submarine warfare exercises and tactical maneuvers conducted at Casco Bay; NS Argentia, Newfoundland; Halifax, Nova Scotia; and New London, Connecticut.

=== 1945 ===
On 21 March 1945, the ship returned to convoy duty, sailing for Great Britain. She made port calls at Derry, Northern Ireland; Liverpool and Falmouth, England; and Loch Alsh, Scotland. Having completed this mission, she reported to the Brown Shipbuilding Corp., Houston, Texas, on 22 June for conversion to a radar picket escort ship. The yard work was completed on 7 December, and the ship received the new designation DER-577 .

=== 1946 ===
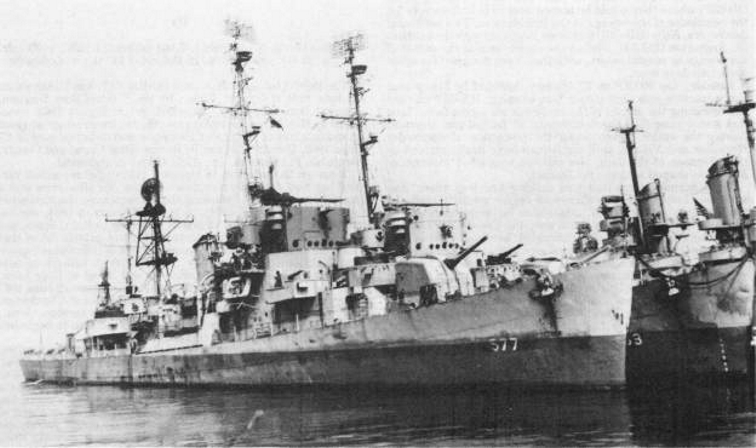
1 June 1946: New York City - Alexander J. Luke (DE 577) following her conversion to a radar picket ship. Naval History and Heritage Command Photo #NH 79724

Alexander J. Luke departed Houston on 8 January 1946. She headed to Guantánamo Bay, Cuba, for shakedown and refresher training. On 1 February, the destroyer escort sailed to Casco Bay for further training and inspections. She reported to Norfolk on 17 February and began preparations for rejoining the active fleet. In late March, the destroyer escort was involved in maneuvers with the escort carrier USS Mindoro. On 17 April, she steamed from Hampton Roads for spring maneuvers in the Caribbean and arrived in Trinidad on the 24th. In early May, Alexander J. Luke planeguarded USS Salerno Bay. She later took part in landing exercises at Culebra Island, Puerto Rico. The vessel departed the Caribbean and arrived in New York City on 26 May.

Alexander J. Luke remained in New York through 10 June, then shifted operations to Casco Bay. From 1 to 26 July, the destroyer escort was in availability. Following this, the ship remained dockside and was used for training personnel. On 6 September, she moved to the New York Naval Shipyard for hull repairs.

=== 1947 ===
The destroyer escort sailed on 7 January 1947 for Norfolk. She joined the carrier USS Sicily and her screen and sailed on 18 January for Guantánamo Bay. Upon their arrival, the ships began three weeks of hunter/killer exercises. On 10 February, Alexander J. Luke touched back at Norfolk. She continued her routine of anti-submarine warfare exercises and tactical maneuvers held along the East Coast through 18 October 1947. On that date, Alexander J. Luke was placed out of commission, in reserve, at Charleston, South Carolina.

== Re-designation and disposition ==
Alexander J. Luke was re-designated DE-577 in August 1954. The ship was never modernized, and an inspection found her unfit for further service. Alexander J. Luke was struck from the Navy List on 1 May 1970 and was expended as a target off Newport, RI, on 22 October 1970.
