= USS Holton =

Buckley-class destroyer escort

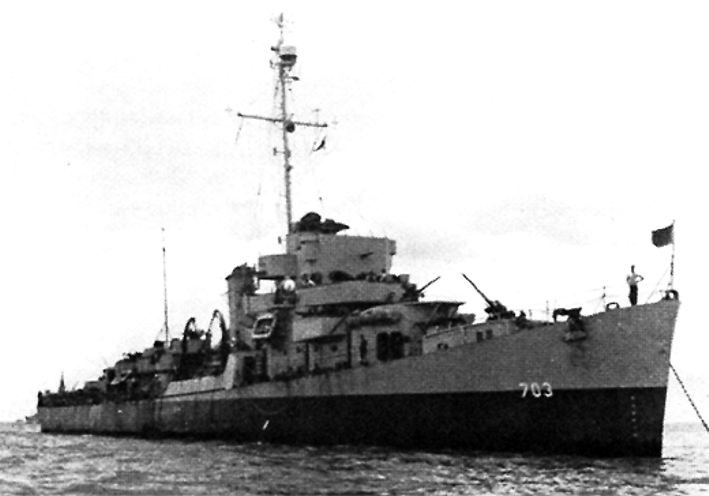

History

United States
- Name: Holton
- Ordered: 1942
- Builder: Defoe Shipbuilding Company, Bay City, Michigan
- Launched: 15 December 1943
- Commissioned: 1 May 1944
- Decommissioned: 31 May 1946
- Identification: DE-703
- Fate: Sold for scrap, 30 May 1974

General characteristics
- Class & type: Buckley-class destroyer escort
- Displacement: 1,400 long tons (1,422 t) standard; 1,740 long tons (1,768 t) full load
- Length: 306 ft (93 m)
- Beam: 37 ft (11 m)
- Draft: 9.5 ft (2.9 m) standard; 11.25 ft (3.43 m) full load
- Propulsion: 2 boilers, General Electric turbo-electric drive; 2 propellers; 12,000 hp (8,900 kW)
- Speed: 23 knots (43 km/h; 26 mph)
- Range: 6,000 nautical miles (11,000 km) at 12 knots (22 km/h).
- Endurance: 359 tons oil
- Armament: 3 × 3"/50 caliber guns 1 × quadruple 1.1"/75 caliber anti-aircraft guns 8 × 20 mm 1 × triple 21-inch (533 mm) torpedo tubes 1 × Hedgehog projector 8 × K-gun depth charge projectors 2 × depth charge tracks

USS Holton (DE-703) was a Buckley-class destroyer escort in service with the United States Navy from 1944 to 1946. She was scrapped in 1974.

== History ==
Holton was launched on 15 December 1943 at Defoe Shipbuilding Company, Bay City, Michigan, sponsored by Edith Holton, mother of Ensign Holton. The new destroyer escort was commissioned on 1 May 1944 at New Orleans, Louisiana.

=== Battle of the Atlantic ===
After shakedown, she sailed on 24 July on the Norfolk – Bizerte convoy run, returning without incident to Boston, Massachusetts, on 9 September. On her second trans-atlantic convoy, begun on 2 October, Holton went into action on 14 October as two ships, a cargo vessel and a tanker loaded with high octane gasoline, collided about 400 miles (640 km) off the African coast and burst into flames. After picking up the crew of the Liberty ship carrying cargo, Holton remained close aboard and sent over a repair party to salvage the fiercely burning ship. Although her hull was being crushed from rolling against the other ship, Holton lay alongside through a long night with six hose lines running to the stricken ship and by morning had succeeded in getting the fire under control. The next day, the ship's crew was transferred back on board and with Holton as escort she proceeded to Dakar, two-thirds of the cargo as well as the ship having been saved.

=== Pacific War ===
Ordered to the Pacific, Holton departed Norfolk on Christmas Day 1944, and arrived at Manus, Admiralty Islands, on 5 February 1945 for duty in the Philippines. From then through the end of the war some six months later, her principal duty was escorting convoys within the Philippine Sea Frontier boundaries. After escorting two Navy ships to Tokyo Bay on 31 August, Holton shepherded a convoy from Okinawa to Korea from 11 to 13 September, and then made two similar voyages to the Chinese coast. Departing Okinawa on 8 November, the destroyer escort streamed her homeward-bound pennant and reached Boston via Pearl Harbor, San Diego, and the Panama Canal on 15 December. Proceeding down the coast,

=== Decommissioning and fate ===
Holton berthed at Green Cove Springs, Florida, on 20 January 1946, and remained there until decommissioning and going into reserve on 31 May 1946. Holton was moved in January 1947 to Orange, Texas. She was sold for scrap on 30 May 1974.

== Namesake ==
Holton was named after Ralph Lee Holton, who was born on 19 September 1918, and graduated from the Naval Academy in December 1941. He was awarded the Navy Cross for his valiant rescue work aiding survivors of the stricken aircraft carrier Lexington on 8 May 1942 in the Battle of the Coral Sea. As officer-in-charge of a boat detailed to rescue survivors from the burning carrier, Ensign Holton, under a hail of flaming debris from bombs, ammunition, and gasoline exploding on Lexington, persistently returned to the stricken ship and thus effected a series of daring rescues in which he saved the lives of many members of the ship's crew who otherwise would have been lost. Less than a month later, on 6 June, Ensign Holton was reported missing and presumed dead as his ship, the destroyer Hammann, was sunk by a Japanese submarine during the Battle of Midway while assisting the aircraft carrier Yorktown.
