= USS Foreman =

Buckley-class destroyer escort

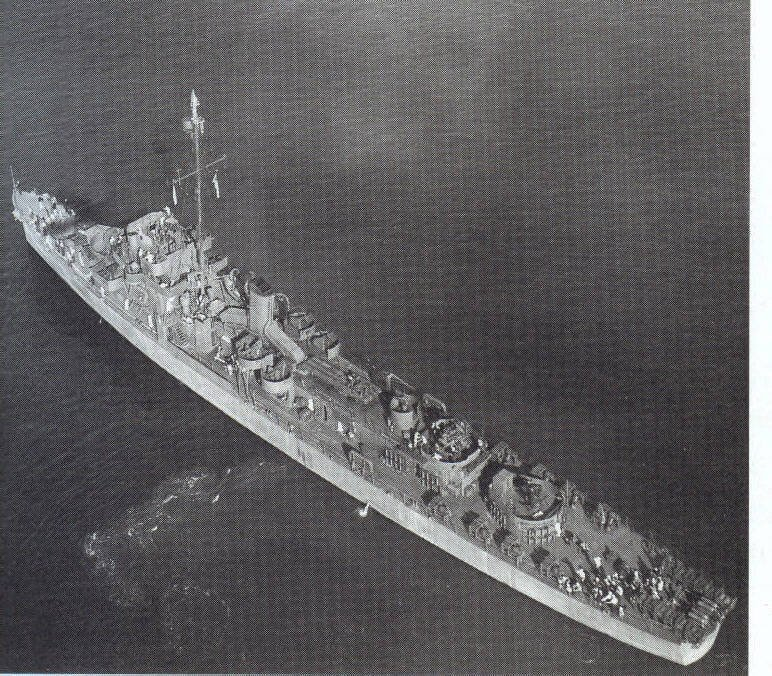
- USS Foreman

History

United States
- Name: USS Foreman
- Namesake: Andrew L. Foreman
- Ordered: 1942
- Builder: Bethlehem Shipbuilding Corporation, San Francisco, California
- Laid down: 9 March 1943
- Launched: 1 August 1943
- Commissioned: 22 October 1943
- Decommissioned: 28 June 1946
- Stricken: 1 April 1965
- Honors and awards: 5 battle stars (World War II)
- Fate: Sold and broken up 1966

General characteristics
- Class & type: Buckley-class destroyer escort
- Displacement: 1,400 long tons (1,422 t) (standard); 1,740 long tons (1,768 t) (full load)
- Length: 306 ft (93 m)
- Beam: 37 ft (11 m)
- Draft: 9 ft 6 in (2.90 m) (standard); 11 ft 3 in (3.43 m) (full load)
- Installed power: 12,000 shp (8,900 kW)
- Propulsion: 2-boiler General Electric turbo-electric drive; 2 × solid manganese-bronze 3,600 lb (1,600 kg) 3-bladed propellers, 8 ft 6 in (2.59 m) diameter, 7 ft 7 in (2.31 m) pitch
- Speed: 23 kn (26 mph; 43 km/h)
- Range: 3,700 nmi (4,300 mi; 6,900 km) at 15 kn (17 mph; 28 km/h); 6,000 nmi (6,900 mi; 11,000 km) at 12 kn (14 mph; 22 km/h)
- Capacity: 359 short tons (326 t) fuel oil
- Complement: 15 officers, 198 men
- Armament: 3 × 3"/50 caliber guns; 4 × 1.1"/75 caliber gun (1×4); 8 × 20 mm anti-aircraft guns; 3 × 21 inch (533 mm) torpedo tubes (1×3); 1 × Hedgehog anti-submarine mortar; 8 × K-gun depth charge projectors; 2 × depth charge tracks

USS Foreman (DE-633), a Buckley-class destroyer escort of the United States Navy, was named in honor of Ensign Andrew L. Foreman (1920–1942), who was killed in action aboard the heavy cruiser USS New Orleans during the Battle of Tassafaronga on 30 November 1942. Ensign Foreman remained at his station to help in saving his ship until asphyxiated by gas generated by the explosion. He was posthumously awarded the Navy Cross for his heroic self-sacrifice.

Foreman was launched on 1 August 1943 at the Bethlehem Steel Company, in San Francisco, California, sponsored by Miss Nadine Foreman, sister of Ensign Foreman; and commissioned on 22 October 1943.

== Service history ==
Foreman arrived at Funafuti, Ellice Islands on 28 January 1944 to begin nine months of convoy escort duty in the southwest Pacific. She guarded the movement of men and supplies as well as of larger combatant ships in the lengthy series of operations necessary to consolidate Allied control of the northern Solomon Islands and western New Guinea. Several times she also served on anti-submarine patrol. Sailing for Sydney, Australia, for upkeep on 29 September, Foreman returned to Hollandia on 18 October, and put to sea on 26 October to escort two hospital transports to newly assaulted Leyte, arriving on 30 October. One of the transports was completely loaded that day, and before midnight, Foreman and this transport sailed for Kossol Roads.

After escorting a resupply convoy to San Pedro Bay in the first week of November 1944, Foreman began duty escorting combatant ships, auxiliaries, and merchantmen between the Manus base and Hollandia, Eniwetok, Majuro, and Ulithi. From 9–19 March 1945, the escort served as station ship at Kossol Roads, then sailed to Ulithi, where she was assigned to Task Force 54 (TF 54) for the invasion of Okinawa.

Foreman sortied from Ulithi on 21 March, and arrived off Okinawa on 25 March. She spent the next five days with a fire support unit bombarding the island in anticipation of the landings on 1 April. On 27 March, when her task force first came under air attack, she fired on a Japanese plane which crashed close aboard on her bow, inflicting no casualties. After the landings, Foreman was assigned to anti-submarine patrol off the entrance to the transport anchorage at Kerama Retto. Here on 3 April, she suffered a direct hit when a lone enemy bomber attacked her. The bomb passed through her bottom to explode about 30 ft (9.1 m) below. All power and light were lost, and one of her firerooms flooded to the waterline, two sailors were killed. Within 30 minutes, damage was under control, and repairs had been made to allow her to make her way under her own power into Kerama Retto for emergency repairs.

Fully repaired at Ulithi between 17 April and 29 May 1945, Foreman returned to patrol off Okinawa on 3 June. As the Japanese air arm had been decimated by this point in the war, the lack of trained and experienced pilots led to its most extensive deployment of kamikaze attacks during this battle. On 11 June, Foreman shot down a kamikaze with the aid of a sister destroyer escort before it could crash her. On 29 June, she was assigned to escort duty with a force covering minesweeping operations in the East China Sea and flying air strikes on Chinese targets, serving with this task force until returning to Okinawa on 16 August for brief overhaul. Escort duty from Buckner Bay followed until 26 September, when she sailed from Wakayama, Japan, with homeward bound servicemen. Arriving at San Diego on 17 October, she disembarked her passengers and sailed on to the east coast. Foreman was decommissioned at Green Cove Springs, Florida on 28 June 1946.

== Awards ==
Foreman received five battle stars for World War II service.
