= Buckley-class destroyer escort =

Class of American destroyer escorts

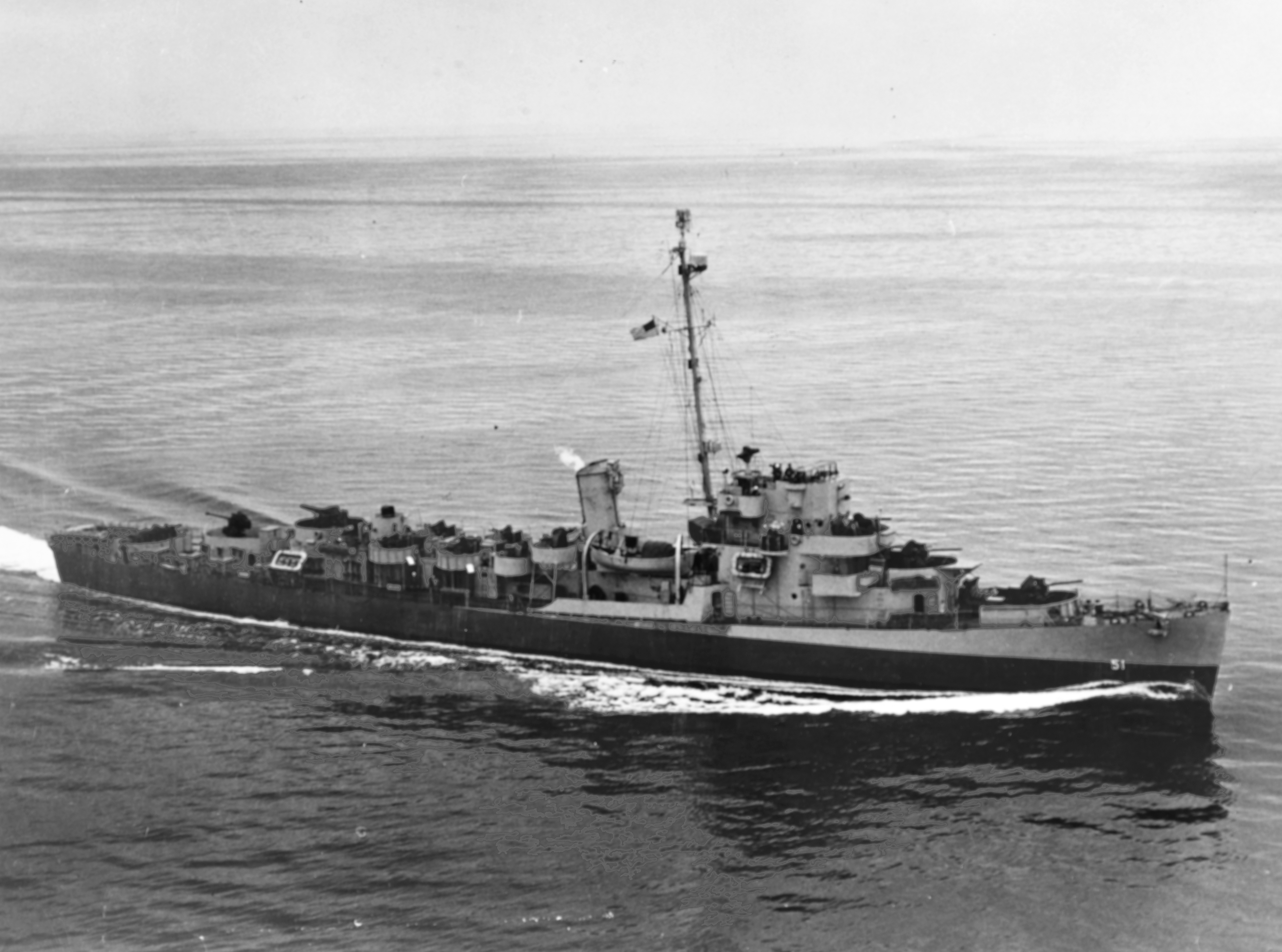
- USS Buckley (DE-51)

Class overview
- Name: Buckley class
- Builders: Bethlehem Steel; Hingham Shipyard, MA; Fore River Shipyard, MA; San Francisco Shipyard, CA; Charleston Navy Yard, SC; Consolidated Steel, TX; Defoe Shipbuilding, MI; Dravo Corporation, PA; Norfolk Navy Yard, VA; Philadelphia Navy Yard, PA
- Operators: World War II; United States Navy; Royal Navy; Post-War; Chilean Navy; Republic of China Navy; Colombian National Navy; Ecuadorian Navy; Republic of Korea Navy; Mexican Navy; Philippine Navy; Royal Navy; United States Navy
- Preceded by: Evarts class
- Succeeded by: Cannon class
- Planned: 154
- Completed: 154

General characteristics
- Type: Destroyer escort
- Displacement: 1,740 tons (fully loaded)
- Length: 306 ft (93.3 m)
- Beam: 36 ft 6 in (11.1 m)
- Draft: 11 ft (3.4 m) (fully loaded)
- Propulsion: Two Foster-Wheeler Express "D"-type water-tube boilers, two GE steam turbines of 13,500 horsepower (10,100 kW) total, two generators (9,200 kilowatts (12,300 hp) total), 12,000 horsepower (8,900 kW) of electric motors drove the two propeller shafts
- Speed: 24 knots (44 km/h; 28 mph) (most ships could attain 26/27 knots)
- Range: 5,500 nautical miles (10,190 km) at 15 knots (28 km/h)
- Capacity: 350 tons oil (fuel)
- Sensors & processing systems: Radar: Type SL surface search fixed to mast above yard arm, type SC and SA air search only fitted to certain ships; Sonar: Type 128D or Type 144 both in retractable dome.; Direction Finding: MF direction finding antenna fitted in front of the bridge and HF/DF Type FH 4 antenna fitted on top of mast
- Armament: Main guns: 3 × 3 inch /50 Mk 22 dual-purpose open mount; Anti-aircraft guns: 4 × 1.1 inch/75 (28mm) guns or 2 × 40 mm Bofors guns (not included on Captain-class ships); 8 × Oerlikon 20 mm cannon Some of the ships had an extra one or two Oerlikons fitted on top of the superstructure amidships; Captain-Class units had additional 20 mm guns; Torpedo tubes: 3 21-inch (533 mm) torpedo tubes in a triple mount; Hedgehog mortar; Up to 200 depth charges

The Buckley-class destroyer escorts were 108 destroyer escorts launched in the United States in 1943–44. They served in World War II as convoy escorts and antisubmarine warfare ships. The lead ship was USS Buckley which was launched on 9 January 1943. The ships had General Electric steam turbo-electric transmission. The ships were prefabricated at various factories in the United States, and the units brought together in the shipyards, where they were welded together on the slipways.

The Buckley class was the second class of destroyer escorts, succeeding the Evarts-class destroyer escorts. One of the main design differences was that the hull was significantly lengthened on the Buckley class; this long-hull design proved so successful that it was used for all further destroyer escort classes. The class was also known as the TE type, from Turbo Electric drive. The TE was replaced with a diesel-electric plant to yield the design of the successor Cannon class ("DET").

In total, 154 were ordered with six being completed as high-speed transport ("APD"). A further 37 were later converted after completion, while 46 of the Buckleys were delivered to the Royal Navy under the Lend-Lease agreement. These 46 were classed as frigates and named after Royal Navy captains of the Napoleonic Wars, forming part of the Captain-class frigate along with 32 Lend-Lease ships of the Evarts class.

After World War II, most of the surviving units of this class were transferred to Taiwan, South Korea, Chile, Mexico, or other countries. The rest were retained by the US Navy's reserve fleet until they were decommissioned.

== Armament ==
The Buckley-class' main armament was three 3-inch/50-caliber guns in Mk 22 dual-purpose open mounts. They fired fixed-type ammunition (antiaircraft, armor-piercing, or star shell) and had a range of 14,600 yards (13,400 m) at 45°, and an antiaircraft ceiling of 28,000 feet (8,500 m)

For antiaircraft defense, the Buckley-class carried four 1.1 inch/75 (28mm) guns or two Bofors 40 mm L/60 guns fitted in the 'X' position. These were not included in the Captain-class units. Eight Oerlikon 20 mm cannons were positioned two in front of the bridge behind and above B gun mount, one on each side of the B gun mount in sponsons, and two on each side of the ship in sponsons just abaft the funnel. Some of the ships had extra Oerlikons fitted on top of the superstructure amidships. The Captain-class units had additional 20 mm guns fitted in 'X' position, and on the director stand for 'X' position.

For antisubmarine weapons, the Buckley class carried a Hedgehog, a British designed spigot mortar that fired 24 bombs ahead of the ship. This was situated on the main deck just aft of 'A' mount. They also carried up to 200 depth charges. Two sets of double rails mounted on each side of the ship at the stern, each holding 24 charges and eight (two on Captain-class units) K-gun depth-charge throwers each holding five charges were on each side of the ship forward of the stern rails. On Captain-class ships, just forward of these, double sets of ready racks were fitted along each side of the ship extending to midships, each set holding 60 depth charges (these ready rails were added after the ships first arrived in the UK).

They also carried three 21-inch (533 mm) torpedo tubes in a triple mount mounted just aft of the stack.

== Ships in class ==
List of Buckley-class destroyer escorts
Ship name	Hull no.	Builder	Laid down	Launched	Comm.	Decomm.	Fate	
Buckley	DE-51	Bethlehem Shipbuilding Corporation, Bethlehem Hingham Shipyard, Hingham, Massachusetts	21 Jul 1942	9 Jan 1943	30 Apr 1943	3 Jul 1946	Reclassified DER-51 26 Apr 1949, reclassified DE-51 29 Sep 1954. Struck from Navy List 1 Jun 1968; sold for scrap July 1969	
Charles Lawrence	DE-53	Bethlehem Shipbuilding Corporation, Bethlehem Hingham Shipyard, Hingham, Massachusetts	1 Aug 1942	16 Feb 1943	31 May 1943	23 Oct 1944	Converted to High Speed Transport, reclassified APD-37 23 Oct 1944	
Charles Lawrence	APD-37	Bethlehem Shipbuilding Corporation, Bethlehem Hingham Shipyard, Hingham, Massachusetts	1 Aug 1942	16 Feb 1943		21 Jun 1946	Converted to High Speed Transport, reclassified APD-37 23 Oct 1944	
Daniel T. Griffin	DE-54	Bethlehem Shipbuilding Corporation, Bethlehem Hingham Shipyard, Hingham, Massachusetts	7 Sep 1942	25 Feb 1943	9 Jun 1943	23 Oct 1944	Converted to High Speed Transport, reclassified APD-38 23 Oct 1944	
Daniel T. Griffin	APD-38	Bethlehem Shipbuilding Corporation, Bethlehem Hingham Shipyard, Hingham, Massachusetts	7 Sep 1942	25 Feb 1943		30 May 1946	Converted to High Speed Transport, reclassified APD-38 23 Oct 1944	
Donnell	DE-56	Bethlehem Shipbuilding Corporation, Bethlehem Hingham Shipyard, Hingham, Massachusetts	27 Nov 1942	13 Mar 1943	26 Jun 1943	23 Oct 1945	Torpedoed by U-473 in North Atlantic 3 May 1944; reclassified IX-182 15 Jul 1944; served as a floating power plant at Cherbourg, France. Struck from the Navy List 10 Nov 1945; sold 29 Apr 1946	
Fogg	DE-57	Bethlehem Shipbuilding Corporation, Bethlehem Hingham Shipyard, Hingham, Massachusetts	4 Dec 1942	20 Mar 1943	7 Jul 1943	27 Oct 1947	Reclassified DER-57 18 Mar 1949, reclassified DE-57 28 Oct 1954. Struck from Navy List 1 Apr 1965; sold for scrap 4 Jan 1966	
Foss	DE-59	Bethlehem Shipbuilding Corporation, Bethlehem Hingham Shipyard, Hingham, Massachusetts	31 Dec 1942	10 Apr 1943	23 Jul 1943	30 Oct 1957	Struck from Navy List 1 Nov 1965 and sold for scrap	
Gantner	DE-60	Bethlehem Shipbuilding Corporation, Bethlehem Hingham Shipyard, Hingham, Massachusetts	31 Dec 1942	17 Apr 1943	29 Jul 1943	23 Feb 1945	Converted to High Speed Transport, reclassified APD-42 23 Feb 1945	
Gantner	APD-42	Bethlehem Shipbuilding Corporation, Bethlehem Hingham Shipyard, Hingham, Massachusetts	31 Dec 1942	17 Apr 1943		2 Aug 1949	Converted to High Speed Transport, reclassified APD-42 23 Feb 1945	
George W. Ingram	DE-62	Bethlehem Shipbuilding Corporation, Bethlehem Hingham Shipyard, Hingham, Massachusetts	6 Feb 1943	8 May 1943	11 Aug 1943	23 Feb 1945	Converted to High Speed Transport, reclassified APD-43 23 Feb 1945	
George W. Ingram	APD-43	Bethlehem Shipbuilding Corporation, Bethlehem Hingham Shipyard, Hingham, Massachusetts	6 Feb 1943	8 May 1943		15 Jan 1947	Converted to High Speed Transport, reclassified APD-43 23 Feb 1945	
Ira Jeffery (ex-Jeffery)	DE-63	Bethlehem Shipbuilding Corporation, Bethlehem Hingham Shipyard, Hingham, Massachusetts	13 Feb 1943	15 May 1943	15 Aug 1943	23 Feb 1945	Converted to High Speed Transport, reclassified APD-44 23 Feb 1945	
Ira Jeffery (ex-Jeffery)	APD-44	Bethlehem Shipbuilding Corporation, Bethlehem Hingham Shipyard, Hingham, Massachusetts	13 Feb 1943	15 May 1943		18 Jun 1946	Converted to High Speed Transport, reclassified APD-44 23 Feb 1945	
Lee Fox	DE-65	Bethlehem Shipbuilding Corporation, Bethlehem Hingham Shipyard, Hingham, Massachusetts	1 Mar 1943	29 May 1943	30 Aug 1943	31 Jul 1944	Converted to High Speed Transport, reclassified APD-45 31 Jul 1944	
Lee Fox	APD-45	Bethlehem Shipbuilding Corporation, Bethlehem Hingham Shipyard, Hingham, Massachusetts	1 Mar 1943	29 May 1943		13 May 1946	Converted to High Speed Transport, reclassified APD-45 31 Jul 1944	
Amesbury	DE-66	Bethlehem Shipbuilding Corporation, Bethlehem Hingham Shipyard, Hingham, Massachusetts	8 Mar 1943	6 Jun 1943	31 Aug 1943	31 Jul 1944	Converted to High Speed Transport, reclassified APD-46 31 Jul 1944	
Amesbury	APD-46	Bethlehem Shipbuilding Corporation, Bethlehem Hingham Shipyard, Hingham, Massachusetts	8 Mar 1943	6 Jun 1943		3 Jul 1946	Converted to High Speed Transport, reclassified APD-46 31 Jul 1944	
Bates	DE-68	Bethlehem Shipbuilding Corporation, Bethlehem Hingham Shipyard, Hingham, Massachusetts	29 Mar 1943	6 Jun 1943	12 Sep 1943	31 Jul 1944	Converted to High Speed Transport, reclassified APD-47 31 Jul 1944; sunk by kamikazes and bombs off Okinawa 25 May 1945	
Bates	APD-47	Bethlehem Shipbuilding Corporation, Bethlehem Hingham Shipyard, Hingham, Massachusetts	29 Mar 1943	6 Jun 1943			Converted to High Speed Transport, reclassified APD-47 31 Jul 1944; sunk by kamikazes and bombs off Okinawa 25 May 1945	
Blessman	DE-69	Bethlehem Shipbuilding Corporation, Bethlehem Hingham Shipyard, Hingham, Massachusetts	22 Mar 1943	19 Jun 1943	19 Sep 1943	31 Jul 1944	Converted to High Speed Transport, reclassified APD-48 31 Jul 1944	
Blessman	APD-48	Bethlehem Shipbuilding Corporation, Bethlehem Hingham Shipyard, Hingham, Massachusetts	22 Mar 1943	19 Jun 1943		15 Jan 1946	Converted to High Speed Transport, reclassified APD-48 31 Jul 1944	
Joseph E. Campbell (ex-Campbell)	DE-70	Bethlehem Shipbuilding Corporation, Bethlehem Hingham Shipyard, Hingham, Massachusetts	29 Mar 1943	26 Jun 1943	23 Sep 1943	24 Nov 1944	Converted to High Speed Transport, reclassified APD-49 24 Nov 1944	
Joseph E. Campbell (ex-Campbell)	APD-49	Bethlehem Shipbuilding Corporation, Bethlehem Hingham Shipyard, Hingham, Massachusetts	29 Mar 1943	26 Jun 1943		15 Nov 1946	Converted to High Speed Transport, reclassified APD-49 24 Nov 1944	
Reuben James	DE-153	Bethlehem Shipbuilding Corporation, Bethlehem Hingham Shipyard, Hingham, Massachusetts	Norfolk Navy Yard	7 Sep 1942	6 Feb 1943	1 Apr 1943	11 Oct 1947	Struck from Navy List 30 Jun 1968, sunk as a target 1 Mar 1971
Sims	DE-154	Bethlehem Shipbuilding Corporation, Bethlehem Hingham Shipyard, Hingham, Massachusetts	Norfolk Navy Yard	7 Sep 1942	6 Feb 1943	24 Apr 1943	25 Sep 1944	Converted to High Speed Transport, reclassified APD-50 25 Sep 1944
Sims	APD-50	Bethlehem Shipbuilding Corporation, Bethlehem Hingham Shipyard, Hingham, Massachusetts	Norfolk Navy Yard	7 Sep 1942	6 Feb 1943		24 Apr 1946	Converted to High Speed Transport, reclassified APD-50 25 Sep 1944
Hopping	DE-155	Bethlehem Shipbuilding Corporation, Bethlehem Hingham Shipyard, Hingham, Massachusetts	Norfolk Navy Yard	15 Dec 1942	10 Mar 1943	21 May 1943	25 Sep 1944	Converted to High Speed Transport, reclassified APD-51 25 Sep 1944
Hopping	APD-51		Norfolk Navy Yard	15 Dec 1942	10 Mar 1943	5 May 1947		Converted to High Speed Transport, reclassified APD-51 25 Sep 1944
Reeves	DE-156	7 Feb 1943	Norfolk Navy Yard	22 Apr 1943	9 May 1943	25 Sep 1944	Converted to High Speed Transport, reclassified APD-52 25 Sep 1944	
Reeves	APD-52	7 Feb 1943	Norfolk Navy Yard	22 Apr 1943		30 Jul 1946	Converted to High Speed Transport, reclassified APD-52 25 Sep 1944	
Fechteler	DE-157	7 Feb 1943	Norfolk Navy Yard	22 Apr 1943	1 Jul 1943	—N/a	Torpedoed and sunk by U-967 northwest of Oran, Algeria 5 May 1944	
Chase	DE-158	16 Mar 1943	Norfolk Navy Yard	24 Apr 1943	18 Jul 1943	28 Nov 1944	Converted to High Speed Transport, reclassified APD-54 28 Nov 1944	
Chase	APD-54	16 Mar 1943	Norfolk Navy Yard	24 Apr 1943		15 Jan 1946	Converted to High Speed Transport, reclassified APD-54 28 Nov 1944	
Laning	DE-159	23 Apr 1943	Norfolk Navy Yard	4 Jul 1943	1 Aug 1943	8 Nov 1944	Converted to High Speed Transport, reclassified APD-55 28 Nov 1944	
Laning	APD-55	23 Apr 1943	Norfolk Navy Yard	4 Jul 1943		28 Jun 1946	Converted to High Speed Transport, reclassified APD-55 28 Nov 1944	
Loy	DE-160	23 Apr 1943	Norfolk Navy Yard	4 Jul 1943	12 Sep 1943	23 Oct 1944	Converted to High Speed Transport, reclassified APD-56 23 Oct 1944	
Loy	APD-56	23 Apr 1943	Norfolk Navy Yard	4 Jul 1943		21 Feb 1947	Converted to High Speed Transport, reclassified APD-56 23 Oct 1944	
Barber	DE-161	27 Apr 1943	Norfolk Navy Yard	20 May 1943	10 Oct 1943	23 Oct 1944	Converted to High Speed Transport, reclassified APD-57 23 Oct 1944. Sold to Mexico on 17 Feb 1969	
Barber	APD-57	27 Apr 1943	Norfolk Navy Yard	20 May 1943		22 Mar 1946	Converted to High Speed Transport, reclassified APD-57 23 Oct 1944. Sold to Mexico on 17 Feb 1969	
Lovelace	DE-198	22 May 1943	Norfolk Navy Yard	4 Jul 1943	7 Nov 1943	22 May 1946	Sunk as target off California, 25 Apr 1968	
Manning	DE-199	Charleston Navy Yard	15 Feb 1943	1 Jun 1943	1 Oct 1943	15 Jan 1947	Struck from Navy List 31 Jul 1968; sold for scrap 27 Oct 1969	
Neuendorf	DE-200	Charleston Navy Yard	15 Feb 1943	1 Jun 1943	18 Oct 1943	14 May 1946	Struck from Navy List 1 Jul 1967	
James E. Craig	DE-201	Charleston Navy Yard	15 Apr 1943	22 Jul 1943	1 Nov 1943	2 Jul 1946	Struck from Navy List 30 Jul 1968; sunk as target off California February 1969	
Eichenberger	DE-202	Charleston Navy Yard	15 Apr 1943	22 Jul 1943	17 Nov 1943	14 May 1946	Struck from Navy List 1 Dec 1972; sold for scrap 1 Nov 1973	
Thomason	DE-203	Charleston Navy Yard	5 Jun 1943	23 Aug 1943	10 Dec 1943	22 May 1946	Struck from Navy List 30 Jun 1968; sold for scrap 30 Jun 1969	
Jordan	DE-204	Charleston Navy Yard	5 Jun 1943	23 Aug 1943	17 Dec 1943	19 Dec 1945	Struck from Navy List 8 Jan 1946; sold for scrap 10 Jul 1947	
Newman	DE-205	Charleston Navy Yard	8 Jun 1943	9 Aug 1943	26 Nov 1943	5 Jul 1944	Converted to High Speed Transport, reclassified APD-59 5 Jul 1944	
Newman	APD-59	Charleston Navy Yard	8 Jun 1943	9 Aug 1943		18 Feb 1946	Converted to High Speed Transport, reclassified APD-59 5 Jul 1944	
Liddle	DE-206	Charleston Navy Yard	12 Jun 1943	9 Aug 1943	6 Dec 1943	5 Jul 1944	Converted to High Speed Transport, reclassified APD-60 5 Jul 1944	
Liddle	APD-60	Charleston Navy Yard	12 Jun 1943	9 Aug 1943			Converted to High Speed Transport, reclassified APD-60 5 Jul 1944	
Kephart	DE-207	Charleston Navy Yard	12 May 1943	6 Sep 1943	7 Jan 1944	5 Jul 1944	Converted to High Speed Transport, reclassified APD-61 5 Jul 1944	
Kephart	APD-61	Charleston Navy Yard	12 May 1943	6 Sep 1943		21 Jun 1946	Converted to High Speed Transport, reclassified APD-61 5 Jul 1944	
Cofer	DE-208	Charleston Navy Yard	12 May 1943	6 Sep 1943	19 Jan 1944	5 Jul 1944	Converted to High Speed Transport, reclassified APD-62 5 Jul 1944	
Cofer	APD-62	Charleston Navy Yard	12 May 1943	6 Sep 1943		28 Jun 1946	Converted to High Speed Transport, reclassified APD-62 5 Jul 1944	
Lloyd	DE-209	Charleston Navy Yard	26 Jul 1943	23 Oct 1943	11 Feb 1944	5 Jul 1944	Converted to High Speed Transport, reclassified APD-63 5 Jul 1944	
Lloyd	APD-63	Charleston Navy Yard	26 Jul 1943	23 Oct 1943			Converted to High Speed Transport, reclassified APD-63 5 Jul 1944	
Otter	DE-210	Charleston Navy Yard	26 Jul 1943	23 Oct 1943	21 Feb 1944	January 1947	Sunk as target off Puerto Rico 10 Jul 1970	
Hubbard	DE-211	Charleston Navy Yard	11 Aug 1943	11 Nov 1943	6 Mar 1944	1 Jun 1945	Converted to High Speed Transport, reclassified APD-53 1 Jun 1945	
Hubbard	APD-53	Charleston Navy Yard	11 Aug 1943	11 Nov 1943		15 Mar 1946	Converted to High Speed Transport, reclassified APD-53 1 Jun 1945	
Hayter	DE-212	Charleston Navy Yard	11 Aug 1943	11 Nov 1943	16 Mar 1944	1 Jun 1945	Converted to High Speed Transport, reclassified APD-80 1 Jun 1945	
Hayter	APD-80	Charleston Navy Yard	11 Aug 1943	11 Nov 1943		19 Mar 1946	Converted to High Speed Transport, reclassified APD-80 1 Jun 1945	
William T. Powell	DE-213	Charleston Navy Yard	26 Aug 1943	27 Nov 1943	28 Mar 1944	9 Dec 1949	Reclassified DER-213 18 Mar 1949, reclassified DE-213 1 Dec 1954. Struck from Navy List 1 Nov 1965, sold for scrap 3 Oct 1966	
William T. Powell	DE-213	Charleston Navy Yard	26 Aug 1943	27 Nov 1943	28 Nov 1950	17 Jan 1958	Reclassified DER-213 18 Mar 1949, reclassified DE-213 1 Dec 1954. Struck from Navy List 1 Nov 1965, sold for scrap 3 Oct 1966	
Scott	DE-214	Philadelphia Navy Yard	1 Jan 1943	3 Apr 1943	20 Jul 1943	3 Mar 1947	Conversion to High Speed Transport and reclassification as APD-64 canceled 10 Sep 1945. Struck from Navy List 1 Jul 1965, sold for scrap 20 Jan 1967	
Burke	DE-215	Philadelphia Navy Yard	1 Jan 1943	3 Apr 1943	20 Aug 1943	24 Jan 1945	Converted to High Speed Transport, reclassified APD-65 24 Jan 1945	
Burke	APD-65	Philadelphia Navy Yard	1 Jan 1943	3 Apr 1943		22 Jun 1949	Converted to High Speed Transport, reclassified APD-65 24 Jan 1945	
Enright	DE-216	Philadelphia Navy Yard	22 Feb 1943	29 May 1943	21 Sep 1943	24 Jan 1945	Converted to High Speed Transport, reclassified APD-66 24 Jan 1945	
Enright	APD-66	Philadelphia Navy Yard	22 Feb 1943	29 May 1943		21 Jun 1946	Converted to High Speed Transport, reclassified APD-66 24 Jan 1945	
Coolbaugh	DE-217	Philadelphia Navy Yard	22 Feb 1943	29 May 1943	15 Oct 1943	21 Feb 1960	Struck from Navy List 1 Jul 1972, sold for scrap 17 Aug 1973	
Darby	DE-218	Philadelphia Navy Yard	22 Feb 1943	29 May 1943	15 Nov 1943	28 Apr 1947	Struck from Navy List 23 Sep 1968, sunk as a target 24 May 1970	
Darby	DE-218	Philadelphia Navy Yard	22 Feb 1943	29 May 1943	24 Oct 1950	23 Sep 1968	Struck from Navy List 23 Sep 1968, sunk as a target 24 May 1970	
J. Douglas Blackwood	DE-219	Philadelphia Navy Yard	22 Feb 1943	29 May 1943	15 Dec 1943	20 Apr 1946	Struck from Navy List 30 Jan 1970, sunk as a target 20 Jul 1970	
J. Douglas Blackwood	DE-219	Philadelphia Navy Yard	22 Feb 1943	29 May 1943	5 Feb 1951	30 Jan 1970	Struck from Navy List 30 Jan 1970, sunk as a target 20 Jul 1970	
Francis M. Robinson	DE-220	Philadelphia Navy Yard	22 Feb 1943	29 May 1943	15 Jan 1944	20 Jun 1960	Struck from Navy List 1 Jul 1972, sold for scrap 12 Jul 1973	
Solar	DE-221	Philadelphia Navy Yard	22 Feb 1943	29 May 1943	15 Feb 1944	21 May 1946	Destroyed by ammunition explosion at Earle, New Jersey 30 Apr 1946. Hulk sunk at sea 9 Jun 1946	
Fowler	DE-222	Philadelphia Navy Yard	5 Apr 1943	3 Jul 1943	15 Mar 1944	28 Jun 1946	Struck from Navy List 1 Jul 1965, sold for scrap 29 Dec 1966	
Spangenberg	DE-223	Philadelphia Navy Yard	5 Apr 1943	3 Jul 1943	15 Apr 1943	18 Jul 1947	Reclassified DER-223 in March 1949, reclassified DE-223 1 Dec 1954. Struck from Navy List 1 Nov 1965, sold for scrap 3 Oct 1966	
Ahrens	DE-575	Bethlehem Shipbuilding Corporation, Bethlehem Hingham Shipyard, Hingham, Massachusetts	5 Nov 1943	21 Dec 1943	12 Feb 1944	24 Jun 1946	Struck from Navy List 1 Apr 1965, sold for scrap 20 Jan 1967	
Barr	DE-576	Bethlehem Shipbuilding Corporation, Bethlehem Hingham Shipyard, Hingham, Massachusetts	5 Nov 1943	28 Dec 1943	16 Feb 1944	31 Jul 1944	Converted to High Speed Transport, reclassified APD-39 31 Jul 1944	
Barr	APD-39	Bethlehem Shipbuilding Corporation, Bethlehem Hingham Shipyard, Hingham, Massachusetts	5 Nov 1943	28 Dec 1943		12 Jul 1946	Converted to High Speed Transport, reclassified APD-39 31 Jul 1944	
Alexander J. Luke	DE-577	Bethlehem Shipbuilding Corporation, Bethlehem Hingham Shipyard, Hingham, Massachusetts	5 Nov 1943	28 Dec 1943	19 Feb 1944	18 Oct 1947	Reclassified DER-577 7 Dec 1945, reclassified DE-577 in August 1954. Struck from Navy List 1 May 1970, sunk as a target 22 Oct 1970	
Robert I. Paine	DE-578	Bethlehem Shipbuilding Corporation, Bethlehem Hingham Shipyard, Hingham, Massachusetts	5 Nov 1943	30 Dec 1943	26 Feb 1944	21 Nov 1947	Reclassified DER-578 18 Mar 1949, reclassified DE-578 1 Dec 1954. Struck from Navy List 1 Jun 1968, sold for scrap 18 Jul 1969	
Foreman	DE-633	Bethlehem Shipbuilding Corporation, San Francisco aka Union Iron Works	9 Mar 1943	1 Aug 1943	22 Oct 1943	28 Jun 1946	Struck from Navy List 1 Apr 1965, sold for scrap 1966	
Whitehurst	DE-634	Bethlehem Shipbuilding Corporation, San Francisco aka Union Iron Works	21 Mar 1943	5 Sep 1943	19 Nov 1943	27 Nov 1946	Struck from Navy List 12 Jul 1969, sunk as target by Trigger (SS-564) 28 Apr 1971	
Whitehurst	DE-634	Bethlehem Shipbuilding Corporation, San Francisco aka Union Iron Works	21 Mar 1943	5 Sep 1943	1 Sep 1950	6 Dec 1958	Struck from Navy List 12 Jul 1969, sunk as target by Trigger (SS-564) 28 Apr 1971	
Whitehurst	DE-634	Bethlehem Shipbuilding Corporation, San Francisco aka Union Iron Works	21 Mar 1943	5 Sep 1943	2 Oct 1961	1 Aug 1962	Struck from Navy List 12 Jul 1969, sunk as target by Trigger (SS-564) 28 Apr 1971	
England	DE-635	Bethlehem Shipbuilding Corporation, San Francisco aka Union Iron Works	4 Apr 1943	26 Sep 1943	10 Dec 1943	15 Oct 1945	Reclassified APD-41 in mid-1945 but conversion to High Speed Transport was canceled 10 Sep 1945. Struck from Navy List 1 Nov 1945, sold and broken up 26 Nov 1946	
Witter	DE-636	Bethlehem Shipbuilding Corporation, San Francisco aka Union Iron Works	28 Apr 1943	17 Oct 1943	29 Dec 1943	22 Oct 1945	Reclassified APD-58 in mid-1945 but conversion to High Speed Transport was canceled 15 Aug 1945. Struck from Navy List 16 Nov 1945, sold and broken up 2 Dec 1946	
Bowers	DE-637	Bethlehem Shipbuilding Corporation, San Francisco aka Union Iron Works	28 May 1943	31 Oct 1943	27 Jan 1944	25 Jun 1945	Converted to High Speed Transport, reclassified APD-40 25 Jun 1945	
Bowers	APD-40	Bethlehem Shipbuilding Corporation, San Francisco aka Union Iron Works	28 May 1943	31 Oct 1943			Converted to High Speed Transport, reclassified APD-40 25 Jun 1945	
Willmarth	DE-638	Bethlehem Shipbuilding Corporation, San Francisco aka Union Iron Works	25 Jun 1943	21 Nov 1943	13 Mar 1944	26 Apr 1946	Struck from Navy List 1 Dec 1966, sold for scrap 1 Jul 1968	
Gendreau	DE-639	Bethlehem Shipbuilding Corporation, San Francisco aka Union Iron Works	1 Aug 1943	12 Dec 1943	17 Mar 1944	13 Mar 1948	Struck from Navy List 1 Dec 1972, sold for scrap 11 Sep 1973	
Fieberling	DE-640	Bethlehem Shipbuilding Corporation, San Francisco aka Union Iron Works	19 Mar 1944	2 Apr 1944	11 Apr 1944	13 Mar 1948	Struck from Navy List 1 Mar 1972, sold for scrap 20 Nov 1972	
William C. Cole	DE-641	Bethlehem Shipbuilding Corporation, San Francisco aka Union Iron Works	5 Sep 1943	29 Dec 1943	12 May 1944	13 Mar 1948	Struck from Navy List 1 Mar 1972, sold for scrap 20 Nov 1972	
Paul G. Baker	DE-642	Bethlehem Shipbuilding Corporation, San Francisco aka Union Iron Works	26 Sep 1943	12 Mar 1944	25 May 1944	3 Feb 1947	Struck from Navy List 1 Dec 1969, sold for scrap October 1970	
Damon M. Cummings	DE-643	Bethlehem Shipbuilding Corporation, San Francisco aka Union Iron Works	17 Oct 1943	18 Apr 1944	29 Jun 1944	3 Feb 1947	Struck from Navy List 1 Mar 1972, sold for scrap 18 May 1973	
Vammen	DE-644	Bethlehem Shipbuilding Corporation, San Francisco aka Union Iron Works	1 Aug 1943	21 May 1944	27 Jul 1944	12 Jul 1969	Struck from Navy List 12 Jul 1969, sunk as target 18 Feb 1971	
Jenks	DE-665	Dravo Corporation, Pittsburgh, Pennsylvania	12 May 1943	11 Sep 1943	19 Jan 1944	26 Jun 1946	Conversion to High Speed Transport and reclassification as APD-67 canceled 1944. Struck from Navy List 1 Feb 1966, sold for scrap 5 Mar 1968	
Durik	DE-666	Dravo Corporation, Pittsburgh, Pennsylvania	22 Jun 1943	9 Oct 1943	24 Mar 1944	15 Jun 1946	Conversion to High Speed Transport and reclassification as APD-68 canceled 1944. Struck from Navy List 1 Jun 1965, sold for scrap 30 Jan 1967	
Wiseman	DE-667	Dravo Corporation, Pittsburgh, Pennsylvania	26 Jul 1943	6 Nov 1943	4 Apr 1944	31 May 1946	Struck from Navy List 15 Apr 1973, sold for scrap 29 Apr 1974	
Wiseman	DE-667	Dravo Corporation, Pittsburgh, Pennsylvania	26 Jul 1943	6 Nov 1943	11 Sep 1950	15 Apr 1973	Struck from Navy List 15 Apr 1973, sold for scrap 29 Apr 1974	
Weber	DE-675	Bethlehem Shipbuilding Corporation, Fore River Shipyard, Quincy, Massachusetts	22 Feb 1943	1 May 1943	30 Jun 1943	—N/a	Converted to High Speed Transport, reclassified APD-75 15 Dec 1944	
Schmitt	DE-676	Bethlehem Shipbuilding Corporation, Fore River Shipyard, Quincy, Massachusetts	22 Feb 1943	29 May 1943	24 Jul 1943	—N/a	Converted to High Speed Transport, reclassified APD-76 24 Jan 1945	
Frament	DE-677	Bethlehem Shipbuilding Corporation, Fore River Shipyard, Quincy, Massachusetts	1 May 1943	28 Jun 1943	15 Aug 1943	—N/a	Converted to High Speed Transport, reclassified APD-77 15 Dec 1944	
Harmon	DE-678	Bethlehem Shipbuilding Corporation, Fore River Shipyard, Quincy, Massachusetts	31 May 1943	25 Jul 1943	31 Aug 1943	25 Mar 1947	Struck from Navy List 1 Aug 1965, sold for scrap 30 Jan 1967	
Greenwood	DE-679	Bethlehem Shipbuilding Corporation, Fore River Shipyard, Quincy, Massachusetts	29 Jun 1943	21 Aug 1943	25 Sep 1943	20 Feb 1967	Struck from Navy List 20 Feb 1967, sold for scrap 6 Sep 1967	
Loeser	DE-680	Bethlehem Shipbuilding Corporation, Fore River Shipyard, Quincy, Massachusetts	27 Jul 1943	11 Sep 1943	10 Oct 1943	28 Mar 1947	Struck from Navy List 23 Aug 1968, sunk as a target 1969	
Loeser	DE-680	Bethlehem Shipbuilding Corporation, Fore River Shipyard, Quincy, Massachusetts	27 Jul 1943	11 Sep 1943	9 Mar 1951	23 Aug 1968	Struck from Navy List 23 Aug 1968, sunk as a target 1969	
Gillette	DE-681	Bethlehem Shipbuilding Corporation, Fore River Shipyard, Quincy, Massachusetts	24 Aug 1943	25 Sep 1943	27 Oct 1943	3 Feb 1947	Struck from Navy List 1 Dec 1972, sold for scrap 11 Sep 1973	
Underhill	DE-682	Bethlehem Shipbuilding Corporation, Fore River Shipyard, Quincy, Massachusetts	16 Sep 1943	15 Oct 1943	15 Nov 1943	—N/a	Sunk by Japanese Kaiten human torpedo northeast of Luzon 24 Jul 1945	
Henry R. Kenyon	DE-683	Bethlehem Shipbuilding Corporation, Fore River Shipyard, Quincy, Massachusetts	29 Sep 1943	30 Oct 1943	30 Nov 1943	3 Feb 1947	Struck from Navy List 1 Dec 1969, sold for scrap 22 Oct 1970	
Bull	DE-693	Defoe Shipbuilding Company, Bay City, Michigan	15 Dec 1942	25 Mar 1943	12 Aug 1943	—N/a	Converted to High Speed Transport, reclassified APD-78 31 Jul 1944	
Bunch	DE-694	Defoe Shipbuilding Company, Bay City, Michigan	22 Feb 1943	29 May 1943	21 Aug 1943	—N/a	Converted to High Speed Transport, reclassified APD-79 31 Jul 1944	
Rich	DE-695	Defoe Shipbuilding Company, Bay City, Michigan	27 Mar 1943	22 Jun 1943	1 Oct 1943	—N/a	Sunk by three mines off Utah Beach, Normandy 8 Jun 1944	
Spangler	DE-696	Defoe Shipbuilding Company, Bay City, Michigan	28 Apr 1943	15 Jul 1943	31 Oct 1943	8 Oct 1958	Struck from Navy List 1 Mar 1972, sold for scrap 20 Nov 1972	
George	DE-697	Defoe Shipbuilding Company, Bay City, Michigan	22 May 1943	14 Aug 1943	20 Nov 1943	8 Oct 1958	Struck from Navy List 1 Nov 1969, sold for scrap 12 Oct 1970	
Raby	DE-698	Defoe Shipbuilding Company, Bay City, Michigan	7 Jun 1943	4 Sep 1943	7 Dec 1943	22 Dec 1953	Reclassified DEC-698 2 Nov 1949, reclassified DE-698 27 Dec 1957. Struck from Navy List 1 Jun 1968, sold for scrap	
Marsh	DE-699	Defoe Shipbuilding Company, Bay City, Michigan	23 Jun 1943	25 Sep 1943	12 Jan 1944	1 Aug 1962	Struck from Navy List 15 Apr 1973, sold for scrap 20 Feb 1974	
Currier	DE-700	Defoe Shipbuilding Company, Bay City, Michigan	21 Jul 1943	14 Oct 1943	1 Feb 1944	4 Apr 1960	Sunk as a target off California 11 Jul 1967	
Osmus	DE-701	Defoe Shipbuilding Company, Bay City, Michigan	17 Aug 1943	4 Nov 1943	23 Feb 1944	15 Mar 1947	Struck from Navy List 1 Dec 1972, sold for scrap 27 Nov 1973	
Earl V. Johnson	DE-702	Defoe Shipbuilding Company, Bay City, Michigan	7 Sep 1943	24 Nov 1943	18 Mar 1944	18 Jun 1946	Struck from Navy List 1 May 1967, sold for scrap 3 Sep 1968	
Holton	DE-703	Defoe Shipbuilding Company, Bay City, Michigan	28 Sep 1943	15 Dec 1943	1 May 1944	31 May 1946	Scrapped	
Cronin	DE-704	Defoe Shipbuilding Company, Bay City, Michigan	19 Oct 1943	5 Jan 1944	5 May 1944	31 May 1946	Reclassified DEC-704 13 Sep 1950, reclassified DE-704 27 Dec 1957. Struck from Navy List 1 Jun 1970, sunk as target 16 Dec 1971	
Cronin	DE-704	Defoe Shipbuilding Company, Bay City, Michigan	19 Oct 1943	5 Jan 1944	9 Feb 1951	4 Dec 1953	Reclassified DEC-704 13 Sep 1950, reclassified DE-704 27 Dec 1957. Struck from Navy List 1 Jun 1970, sunk as target 16 Dec 1971	
Frybarger	DE-705	Defoe Shipbuilding Company, Bay City, Michigan	8 Nov 1943	25 Jan 1944	18 May 1944	30 Jun 1947	Reclassified DEC-705 13 Sep 1950, reclassified DE-705 27 Dec 1957. Struck from Navy List 1 Dec 1972, sold for scrap 27 Nov 1973	
Frybarger	DE-705	Defoe Shipbuilding Company, Bay City, Michigan	8 Nov 1943	25 Jan 1944	6 Oct 1950	9 Dec 1954	Reclassified DEC-705 13 Sep 1950, reclassified DE-705 27 Dec 1957. Struck from Navy List 1 Dec 1972, sold for scrap 27 Nov 1973	
Tatum	DE-789	Consolidated Steel Corporation, Orange, Texas	22 Apr 1943	7 Aug 1943	22 Nov 1943	—N/a	Converted to High Speed Transport, reclassified APD-81 15 Dec 1944	
Borum	DE-790	Consolidated Steel Corporation, Orange, Texas	28 Apr 1943	14 Aug 1943	30 Nov 1943	15 Jun 1946	Conversion to High Speed Transport and reclassification as APD-82 canceled September 1945. Struck from Navy List 1 Aug 1965, sold for scrap 1966	
Maloy	DE-791	Consolidated Steel Corporation, Orange, Texas	10 May 1943	18 Aug 1943	13 Dec 1943	28 May 1965	Conversion to High Speed Transport and reclassification as APD-83 canceled September 1945. Reclassified EDE-791 14 Aug 1946. Struck from Navy List 1 Jun 1965, sold for scrap 11 Mar 1966	
Haines	DE-792	Consolidated Steel Corporation, Orange, Texas	17 May 1943	26 Aug 1943	27 Dec 1943	—N/a	Converted to High Speed Transport, reclassified APD-84 15 Dec 1944	
Runels	DE-793	Consolidated Steel Corporation, Orange, Texas	7 Jun 1943	4 Sep 1943	3 Jan 1944	—N/a	Converted to High Speed Transport, reclassified APD-85 24 Jan 1945	
Hollis	DE-794	Consolidated Steel Corporation, Orange, Texas	5 Jul 1943	11 Sep 1943	24 Jan 1944	—N/a	Converted to High Speed Transport, reclassified APD-86 24 Jan 1945	
Gunason	DE-795	Consolidated Steel Corporation, Orange, Texas	9 Aug 1943	16 Oct 1943	1 Feb 1944	13 Mar 1948	Sunk as target 28 Jul 1973, struck from Navy List 1 Sep 1973	
Major	DE-796	Consolidated Steel Corporation, Orange, Texas	16 Aug 1943	23 Oct 1943	12 Feb 1944	13 Mar 1948	Struck from Navy List 1 Dec 1972, sold for scrap 27 Nov 1973	
Weeden	DE-797	Consolidated Steel Corporation, Orange, Texas	18 Aug 1943	27 Oct 1943	19 Feb 1944	9 May 1946	Struck from Navy List 30 Jun 1968, sold for scrap 27 Oct 1969	
Weeden	DE-797	Consolidated Steel Corporation, Orange, Texas	18 Aug 1943	27 Oct 1943	20 Nov 1946	26 Feb 1958	Struck from Navy List 30 Jun 1968, sold for scrap 27 Oct 1969	
Varian	DE-798	Consolidated Steel Corporation, Orange, Texas	27 Aug 1943	6 Nov 1943	29 Feb 1944	15 Mar 1946	Struck from Navy List 1 Dec 1972, sold for scrap 12 Jan 1974	
Scroggins	DE-799	Consolidated Steel Corporation, Orange, Texas	4 Sep 1943	6 Nov 1943	30 Mar 1944	15 Jun 1946	Struck from Navy List 1 Jul 1965, sold for scrap 5 Apr 1967	
Jack W. Wilke	DE-800	Consolidated Steel Corporation, Orange, Texas	18 Oct 1943	18 Dec 1943	7 Mar 1944	24 May 1960	Struck from Navy List 1 Aug 1972, sold for scrap 4 Mar 1974	

== See also ==
- Escorteur
- List of frigates of World War II
- List of destroyer escorts of the United States Navy
- List of frigates of the United States Navy subset of above with hull numbers DE/FF 1037 and higher plus all DEG/FFGs because of the United States Navy 1975 ship reclassification
- List of frigate classes of the Royal Navy
- List of Captain-class frigates
