= USS Lee Fox =

Buckley-class destroyer escort

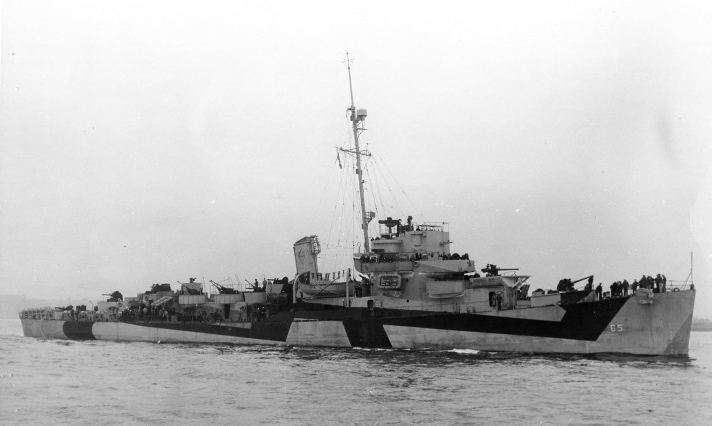
- USS Lee Fox

History

United States
- Name: USS Lee Fox
- Ordered: 1942
- Builder: Bethlehem Hingham Shipyard
- Laid down: 1 March 1943
- Launched: 29 May 1943
- Commissioned: 30 August 1943
- Decommissioned: 13 May 1946
- Reclassified: APD-45, 23 February 1945
- Stricken: 1 September 1964
- Fate: Sold for scrap, 31 January 1966

General characteristics
- Class & type: Buckley-class destroyer escort
- Displacement: 1,400 long tons (1,422 t) light; 1,740 long tons (1,768 t) standard
- Length: 306 ft (93 m)
- Beam: 37 ft (11 m)
- Draft: 9 ft 6 in (2.90 m) standard; 11 ft 3 in (3.43 m) full load
- Propulsion: 2 × boilers; General Electric turbo-electric drive; 12,000 shp (8.9 MW); 2 × solid manganese-bronze 3,600 lb (1,600 kg) 3-bladed propellers, 8 ft 6 in (2.59 m) diameter, 7 ft 7 in (2.31 m) pitch; 2 × rudders; 359 tons fuel oil
- Speed: 23 knots (43 km/h; 26 mph)
- Range: 3,700 nmi (6,900 km) at 15 kn (28 km/h; 17 mph); 6,000 nmi (11,000 km) at 12 kn (22 km/h; 14 mph)
- Complement: 15 officers, 198 men
- Armament: 3 × 3"/50 caliber guns; 1 × quad 1.1"/75 caliber gun; 8 × single 20 mm guns; 1 × triple 21 inch (533 mm) torpedo tubes; 1 × Hedgehog anti-submarine mortar; 8 × K-gun depth charge projectors; 2 × depth charge tracks

USS Lee Fox (DE-65/APD-45), a Buckley-class destroyer escort of the United States Navy, was named in honor of Ensign Lee Fox (1920–1941), who was killed in action during the Japanese attack on Pearl Harbor, on 7 December 1941.

Lee Fox was laid down on 1 March 1943 at the Bethlehem-Hingham Shipyard, Inc., in Hingham, Massachusetts; launched on 29 May 1943, sponsored by Mrs. Lee Fox, mother of Ensign Fox; and commissioned on 30 August 1943.

== Service history ==
Built with dispatch, Lee Fox helped to overcome the German submarine menace in the Atlantic. Her greatest enemy, however, turned out to be the buffeting storms of the North Atlantic. Returning from her Bermuda shakedown voyage on 17 October 1943, she was overtaken by a hurricane that almost capsized the vessel and caused a fire in the aft engine room. On 11 December off Cape Cod, during a storm, a projectile exploded on her forecastle, causing more fire damage and further yard repairs.

Overcoming her early misfortunes, Lee Fox completed 18 Atlantic crossings between 6 November 1943 and 7 January 1945. Derry, Northern Ireland, became her port away from home as she helped escort the invasion troops and supplies to England for "Operation Overlord", the invasion of Normandy. The last round-trip voyage required 30 days to convoy heavy equipment, such as floating cranes and powerplants, being towed to Plymouth, England, for use in the captured ports on the continent. Her only sure contact with enemy submarines occurred on 20 December 1944 when two ships in the return convoy were torpedoed.

Beginning on 21 February 1945, Lee Fox was converted to a Charles Lawrence-class high-speed transport and reclassified APD-45 two days later. On 7 May, she sortied from Norfolk, Virginia, with TU 29.6.1 bound for the war in the Pacific. Lee Fox arrived at Pearl Harbor on 31 May, having transited the Panama Canal on 13 May and spent three days at San Diego, California.

After she had additional training with Naval Combat Demolition Teams, 120 passengers were embarked on 18 June for Guam. Continuing westward from Guam with a new list of passengers, Lee Fox next dropped anchor in San Pedro Bay, Philippines, on 6 July. Here, the end of the war overtook her, but on 9 September the first of a series of escort assignments ended at Tokyo Bay. As a member of TU 53.7.1, she sailed for Yokohama on 23 October to see that the northern Japanese islands of Ōshima and others nearby were complying with the terms of surrender.

Released from this duty on 15 November, she sailed for home before the end of the month and disembarked 123 veterans at San Diego on 15 December. Departing New Year's Day 1946, she reached her home port of Boston on 17 January. Following a period in dry dock, she arrived at Green Cove Springs, Florida, on 14 February 1946 and decommissioned there on 13 May and entered the Atlantic Reserve Fleet.

Struck from the Navy List on 1 September 1964, Lee Fox was sold on 31 January 1966 for scrapping to the Southern Scrap Material Company, New Orleans, Louisiana.
