= USS Francis M. Robinson =

Buckley-class destroyer escort

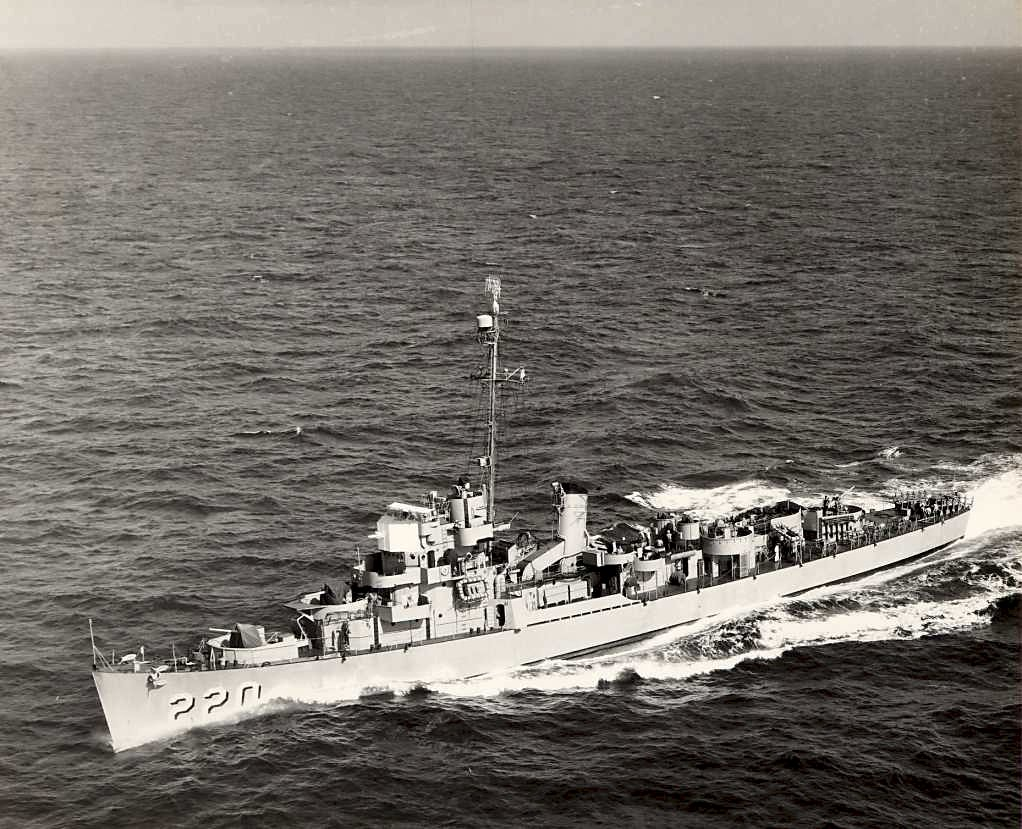

History

United States
- Name: USS Francis M. Robinson
- Namesake: Francis M. Robinson
- Ordered: 1942
- Builder: Philadelphia Navy Yard, Philadelphia, Pennsylvania
- Laid down: 22 February 1943
- Launched: 29 May 1943
- Commissioned: 15 January 1944
- Decommissioned: 20 June 1960
- Stricken: 1 July 1972
- Honors and awards: 1 battle star & Presidential Unit Citation (World War II)
- Fate: Sold for scrap, 12 July 1973

General characteristics
- Class & type: Buckley-class destroyer escort
- Displacement: 1,400 long tons (1,422 t) standard; 1,740 long tons (1,768 t) full load
- Length: 306 ft (93 m)
- Beam: 37 ft (11 m)
- Draft: 9 ft 6 in (2.90 m) standard; 11 ft 3 in (3.43 m) full load
- Propulsion: 2 × boilers; General Electric turbo-electric drive; 12,000 shp (8.9 MW); 2 × solid manganese-bronze 3,600 lb (1,600 kg) 3-bladed propellers, 8 ft 6 in (2.59 m) diameter, 7 ft 7 in (2.31 m) pitch; 2 × rudders; 359 tons fuel oil
- Speed: 23 knots (43 km/h; 26 mph)
- Range: 3,700 nmi (6,900 km) at 15 kn (28 km/h; 17 mph); 6,000 nmi (11,000 km) at 12 kn (22 km/h; 14 mph)
- Complement: 15 officers, 198 men
- Armament: 3 × 3"/50 caliber guns; 1 × quad 1.1"/75 caliber gun; 8 × single 20 mm guns; 1 × triple 21 inch (533 mm) torpedo tubes; 1 × Hedgehog anti-submarine mortar; 8 × K-gun depth charge projectors; 2 × depth charge tracks

USS Francis M. Robinson (DE-220), a Buckley-class destroyer escort of the United States Navy, was named in honor of Commander Francis M. Robinson (1883–1942), who was a recipient of the Navy Cross.

Francis M. Robinson was launched on 1 May 1943 by Philadelphia Navy Yard; sponsored by Mrs. Francis M. Robinson, widow of Commander Robinson; and commissioned on 15 January 1944.

== Service history ==
After a period of service as escort along the east coast, Francis M. Robinson arrived at Norfolk, Virginia on 2 May 1944 to join the Bogue (CVE-9) hunter-killer group, an outstandingly successful anti-submarine force in whose Presidential Unit Citation Francis M. Robinson was to share. Patrolling off the Cape Verde Islands on 13 May, she made a sound contact, and mounted a deliberate attack with depth charges and hedgehogs which sank the RO-501, the former U-1224.

Upon the return of the Bogue group to New York on 4 July, Francis M. Robinson was detached. She served briefly to aid submarines in training out of New London, Connecticut, and on 2 August sailed from New York on the first of five convoy escort voyages to north African ports. During the fourth such voyage, on 17 February as the convoy formed up to pass eastward through the Strait of Gibraltar, two of the merchantmen were torpedoed. Francis M. Robinson saw one sail off to port under her own power, and remained with the other, sending a damage control party on board to assist in stopping flooding, until a tug came out of Gibraltar.

Completing her convoy duty on 15 May 1945, Francis M. Robinson aided submarines training out of New London, and was school ship at the Naval Training Center at Miami, and from November through February 1946 served as plane guard for carriers training in Chesapeake Bay.

She first arrived at Key West, her base for the remainder of her naval career, on 6 February 1947, and from that time conducted development operations in anti-submarine warfare. Her activities took her on cruises along the east coast and throughout the Caribbean and Gulf of Mexico, and were varied with participation in exercises of many types. Francis M. Robinson was placed out of commission in reserve at Philadelphia on 20 June 1960.

Francis M. Robinson was struck from the Naval Vessel Register on 1 July 1972, and sold for scrap on 12 July 1973.

== Awards ==
In addition to the Presidential Unit Citation, Francis M. Robinson received one battle star for World War II service.
