= USS J. Douglas Blackwood =

Buckley-class destroyer escort

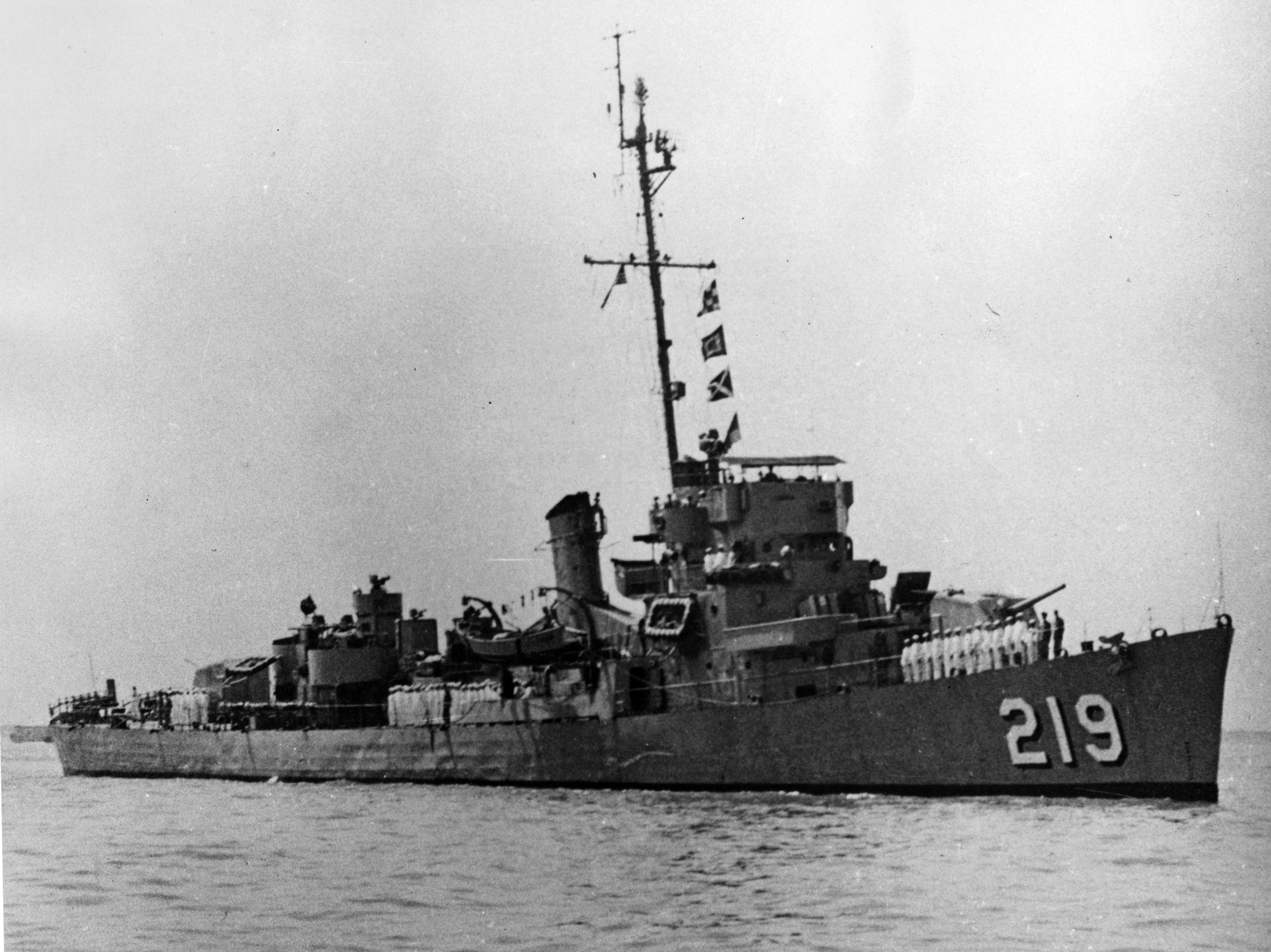

History

United States
- Name: USS J. Douglas Blackwood
- Namesake: J. Douglas Blackwood
- Ordered: 1942
- Builder: Philadelphia Navy Yard, Philadelphia, Pennsylvania
- Laid down: 22 February 1943
- Launched: 29 May 1943
- Commissioned: 15 December 1943
- Decommissioned: 20 April 1946
- Commissioned: 5 February 1951
- Decommissioned: 1 August 1958
- In service: 1 August 1958
- Out of service: 2 October 1961
- Recommissioned: 2 October 1961
- Decommissioned: 1 August 1962
- In service: 1 August 1962
- Out of service: 30 January 1970
- Stricken: 30 January 1970
- Honors and awards: 3 battle stars (World War II)
- Fate: Sunk as a target, 20 July 1970

General characteristics
- Class & type: Buckley-class destroyer escort
- Displacement: 1,400 long tons (1,422 t) standard; 1,740 long tons (1,768 t) full load
- Length: 306 ft (93 m)
- Beam: 37 ft (11 m)
- Draft: 9 ft 6 in (2.90 m) standard; 11 ft 3 in (3.43 m) full load
- Propulsion: 2 × boilers; General Electric turbo-electric drive; 12,000 shp (8.9 MW); 2 × solid manganese-bronze 3,600 lb (1,600 kg) 3-bladed propellers, 8 ft 6 in (2.59 m) diameter, 7 ft 7 in (2.31 m) pitch; 2 × rudders; 359 tons fuel oil
- Speed: 23 knots (43 km/h; 26 mph)
- Range: 3,700 nmi (6,900 km) at 15 kn (28 km/h; 17 mph); 6,000 nmi (11,000 km) at 12 kn (22 km/h; 14 mph)
- Complement: 15 officers, 198 men
- Armament: 2 × 5"/38 caliber guns; 1 × quad 1.1"/75 caliber gun; 8 × single 20 mm guns; 1 × triple 21-inch (533 mm) torpedo tubes; 1 × Hedgehog anti-submarine mortar; 8 × K-gun depth charge projectors; 2 × depth charge tracks

USS J. Douglas Blackwood (DE-219), was a Buckley-class destroyer escort in service with the United States Navy from 1943 to 1946 and from 1951 to 1961. She was sunk as a target in 1970.

The ship's namesake, James Douglas Blackwood, was killed aboard USS Vincennes during the Battle of Savo Island.

== Construction and commissioning ==
J. Douglas Blackwood was launched on 29 May 1943, by Philadelphia Navy Yard; sponsored by Mrs. J. Douglas Blackwood, widow of Comdr. Blackwood; and commissioned on 15 December 1943.

== Service history ==
=== 1943–1946 ===
After shakedown off Bermuda, J. Douglas Blackwood rendezvoused with carrier Hornet (CV-12) off Hampton Roads on 14 February 1944, to escort her to the Panama Canal. The escort ship then returned to the East Coast for duty as training ship and coastal escort until departing Norfolk, Virginia on 18 March for the Pacific. Sailing via the Panama Canal and Pearl Harbor, J. Douglas Blackwood, arrived at Majuro on 18 April 1944, to begin vital convoy screening work between America's far-flung island bases. The ship operated mainly in the Solomons and Admiralties, returning to Pearl Harbor in October 1944 for anti-submarine training.

J. Douglas Blackwood, steamed to Eniwetok on 2 November, and resumed convoy escort work, this time between the Solomons and the Philippines. As that great archipelago was liberated, island by island, the escort ship helped bring supplies and men from advance bases. She remained on this duty until arriving at Pearl Harbor on 12 April 1945, and for the remainder of the war operated in Hawaiian waters training with newly commissioned carriers and Pacific Fleet submarines.

The war over, J. Douglas Blackwood steamed into Mare Island Navy Yard on 4 September 1945, and after repairs made the long voyage through the Canal to the East Coast. She arrived at New London on 9 January 1946, decommissioned on 20 April 1946, and entered the Atlantic Reserve Fleet.

=== 1950–1958 ===
With the outbreak of fighting in Korea in 1950, the Navy's need of fighting ships once again increased. J. Douglas Blackwood, recommissioned on 5 February 1951. Based at Norfolk, the ship alternated between duty there and the Fleet Sonar School at Key West, Florida. She also engaged in at sea training for midshipmen, cruising to the Caribbean and Brazil in the summer of 1953. She remained on this duty until arriving at Philadelphia on 15 November 1957. There she began her new assignment as Reserve Training Ship. J. Douglas Blackwood decommissioned on 1 August 1958, and was placed "in service." For the next three years, she acted as training ship for naval reservists in the Philadelphia area.

=== 1961–1970 ===
During the 1961 Berlin Crisis, the ship was again recalled to active service, commissioning on 2 October 1961. After refresher training in the Caribbean, she served on escort and patrol duty in the Atlantic through the summer of 1962. She decommissioned on 1 August 1962, reverted to her "in-service" status, and resumed reserve training duty at Philadelphia. J. Douglas Blackwood remained on this important duty into 1967, always ready to serve the Navy in time of need.

From January 1969 to January 1970 the Blackwood was assigned to the Naval Reserve Training Facility 3rd Naval District in Whitestone, N.Y.

J. Douglas Blackwood was struck from the Naval Vessel Register on 30 January 1970, and was sunk as a target on 20 July 1970.

== Awards ==
J. Douglas Blackwood received three battle stars for World War II service.
