= USS Earl V. Johnson =

Buckley-class destroyer escort

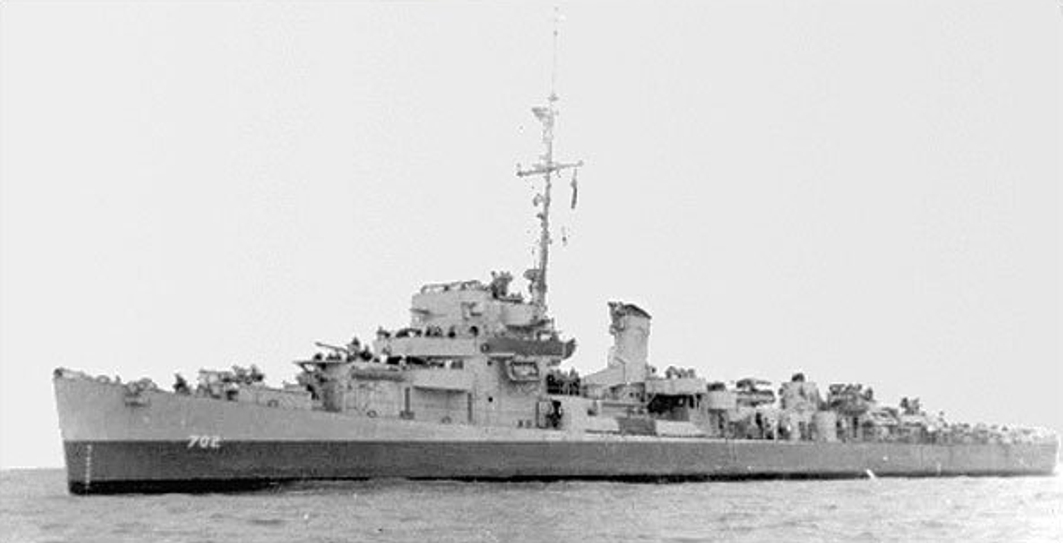

History

United States
- Ordered: 1942
- Builder: Defoe Shipbuilding Company, Bay City, Michigan
- Laid down: 7 September 1943
- Launched: 24 November 1943
- Commissioned: 18 March 1944
- Decommissioned: 18 June 1946
- Stricken: 1 May 1967
- Fate: Sold for scrap, 3 September 1968

General characteristics
- Displacement: 1,740 long tons (1,770 t) full; 1,400 long tons (1,400 t), standard
- Length: 306 ft 0 in (93.27 m)
- Beam: 36 ft 9 in (11.20 m)
- Draft: 9 ft 6 in (2.90 m)
- Propulsion: 2 boilers, General Electric Turbo-electric drive; 2 solid manganese-bronze 3,600 lb 3-bladed propellers, 8.5 ft (2.6 m) diameter, 7 ft 7 in (2.31 m) pitch; 12,000 hp (8.9 MW)
- Speed: 23 knots (43 km/h)
- Range: 359 tons oil; 3,700 nautical miles (6,900 km) at 15 knots (28 km/h); 6,000 nautical miles (11,000 km) at 12 knots (22 km/h)
- Complement: 15 officers, 210 men
- Armament: 3 × 3 in (76 mm) DP guns; 3 × 21 in (53 cm) torpedo tubes; 1 × 1.1 in (28 mm) quad AA gun; 8 × 20 mm cannon; 1 × hedgehog projector; 2 × depth charge tracks; 8 × K-gun depth charge projectors

USS Earl V. Johnson (DE-702) was a Buckley-class destroyer escort in service with the United States Navy from 1944 to 1946. She was scrapped in 1968.

The ship was named for Earl Vincent Johnson, a naval aviator killed during the Battle of the Coral Sea on 8 May 1942

== Construction and commissioning ==
Earl V. Johnson was launched on 24 November 1943 at the Defoe Shipbuilding Company, in Bay City, Michigan, sponsored by Mrs. Selma E. Johnson, mother of Lt.(j.g.) Johnson, and commissioned on 18 March 1944, with Lieutenant Commander J. J. Jordy, USNR, in command.

== History ==
Between 23 May and 19 November 1944, Earl V. Johnson made three voyages as convoy escort, guarding vital troops and supplies travelling from Norfolk to Casablanca and Bizerte. After training at Boston, Massachusetts, she joined the Pacific Fleet, calling at New York, Norfolk, the Panama Canal, Bora Bora in the Society Islands, and arriving at the giant fleet base at Manus, Admiralty Islands, on 22 January 1945.

Earl V. Johnson was assigned patrol duties in the Philippines, and guarded convoys plying between New Guinea and Leyte Gulf until 17 April 1945. Supporting the invasion of Okinawa, now in full swing, and air strikes on Japan, she became invaluable in moving men and supplies to the advance bases at Kossol Roads and Ulithi. She departed Leyte on 25 July with an LST convoy bound for Okinawa. As she returned, on 7 August, a sonar contact developed into a 3-hour duel with a submarine, which damaged Earl V. Johnson but ended favorably with an underwater explosion and a plume of white smoke. Japanese records show this was the submarine I-53 which survived the attack.

With hostilities ended, Earl V. Johnson arrived at Okinawa on 4 September, and a week later, began the occupation of Jinsen and Taku, piloting vessels, guarding against submarines, and spotting and destroying mines. She departed Buckner Bay, Okinawa, on 8 November 1945, arriving at Boston on 15 December.

She was placed out of commission in reserve at Jacksonville, Florida, on 18 June 1946.

Earl V. Johnson was stricken from the Navy Register on 1 May 1967, and sold on 3 September 1968.
