= USS Jones =

USS Jones may refer to various United States Navy ships:

- USS Jones (1814), a brig launched in 1814 and sold in 1821
- USS Bessie Jones (SP-1476) Maryland State Oyster Police Force schooner in Navy service 1917-1919
- USS Claud Jones (DE-1033), a destroyer escort commissioned in 1959 and stricken in 1974
- USS Commodore Jones, an armed sidewheel ferry purchased in 1863 and sunk in 1864
- USS Hilary P. Jones (DD-427), a destroyer in commission from 1940 to 1947
- USS Jacob Jones, the name of more than one ship
- USS John Paul Jones, the name of more than one ship
- USS Paul Jones, the name of more than one ship
- USS Paul Jones Jr. (1863), a steam launch launched in 1863 and sold in 1865
- USS William Jones (DD-308), a destroyer in commission from 1920 to 1930
