= William Lansing =

William Lansing is the name of:

- William E. Lansing (1821–1883), U.S. Representative from New York
- William Henry Lansing (1914–1942), American plane captain who was killed in action in World War II
