= USS Strickland =

US naval vessel (1943–1959)

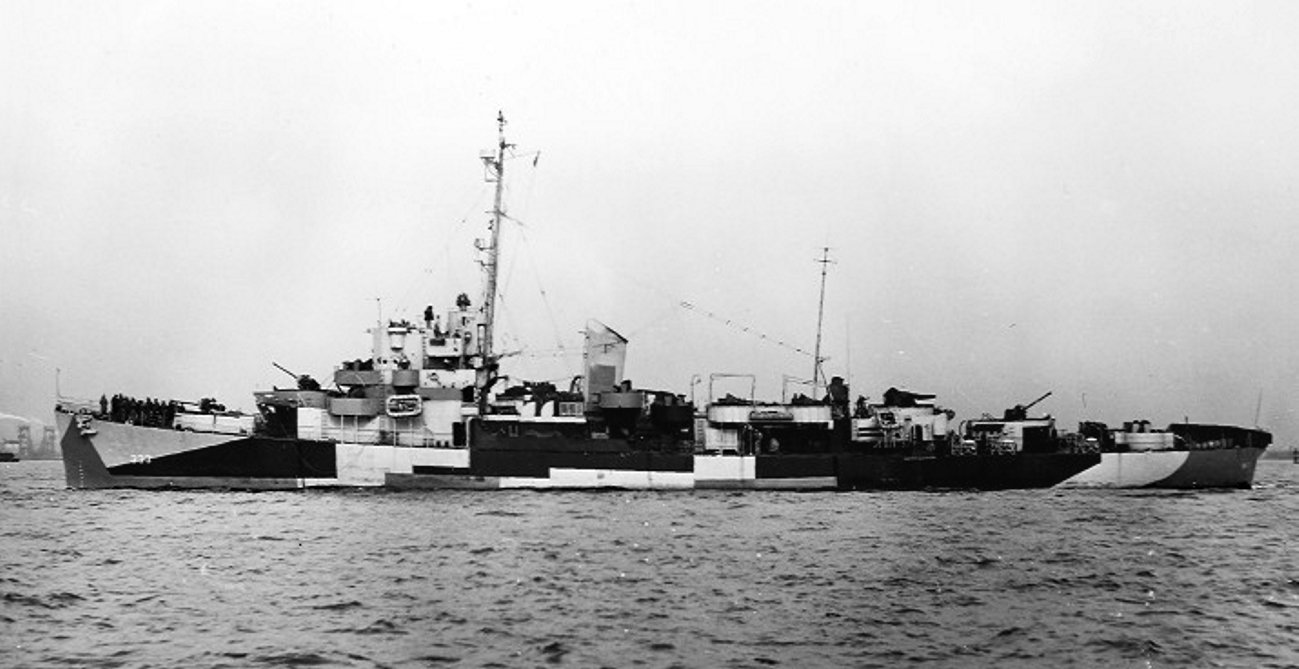

History

United States
- Namesake: Everett C. Strickland
- Builder: Consolidated Steel Corporation, Orange, Texas
- Laid down: 23 August 1943
- Launched: 2 November 1943
- Commissioned: 10 January 1944
- Decommissioned: 17 June 1959
- Reclassified: DER-333, 1 October 1951
- Stricken: 1 December 1972
- Fate: Sold for scrapping 13 August 1974

General characteristics
- Class & type: Edsall-class destroyer escort
- Displacement: 1,253 tons standard; 1,590 tons full load
- Length: 306 feet (93.27 m)
- Beam: 36.58 feet (11.15 m)
- Draft: 10.42 full load feet (3.18 m)
- Propulsion: 4 FM diesel engines, 4 diesel-generators, 6,000 shp (4.5 MW), 2 screws
- Speed: 21 knots (39 km/h)
- Range: 9,100 nmi. at 12 knots; (17,000 km at 22 km/h)
- Complement: 8 officers, 201 enlisted
- Armament: 3 × single 3 in (76 mm)/50 guns; 1 × twin 40 mm AA guns; 8 × single 20 mm AA guns; 1 × triple 21 in (533 mm) torpedo tubes; 8 × depth charge projectors; 1 × depth charge projector (hedgehog); 2 × depth charge tracks

USS Strickland (DE-333) was an Edsall-class destroyer escort in service with the United States Navy from 1944 to 1946 and from 1952 to 1959. She was sold for scrapping in 1974.

== Namesake ==
Everett C. Strickland was born on 6 July 1918 in Waterport, New York. He enlisted in the United States Naval Reserve as a seaman second class on 17 February 1941. He attended elimination flight training at Brooklyn, N.Y., and was then assigned to flight training at Naval Air Station Jacksonville, Florida. He was promoted to Ensign and assigned to active duty on 13 January 1942. He served on USS Astoria and participated in the Battle of the Coral Sea and the Battle of Midway before he was killed on 9 August 1942 when Astoria was sunk in the Battle of Savo Island.

== History ==
Strickland was laid down on 23 August 1943 by the Consolidated Steel Corp., Orange, Texas; launched on 2 November 1943; sponsored by Mrs. Everett Strickland; and commissioned on 10 January 1944.

=== World War II ===
==== Battle of the Atlantic ====
Strickland sailed for Bermuda on her shakedown cruise and thence to Norfolk, Virginia. She stood out of that port on 24 March in the screen of convoy UGS-37, consisting of 60 merchant ships and six LSTs, en route to Bizerte. The voyage to Gibraltar was uneventful; but, once the Allied ships entered the Mediterranean, they were trailed by German planes. The Luftwaffe struck late in the evening of 11 April when the convoy was off Cape Bengut, Algeria, with a force of approximately 25 Dornier 217s and Junker 88s making bombing and torpedo runs. Strickland, on the starboard flank of the convoy, splashed a Junker that was making a strafing run on her. During the action, USS Holder was torpedoed and badly damaged. The ship's return trip to the United States was uneventful, and she arrived at New York on 11 May.

Strickland continued on the Norfolk-to-Bizerte run for five months and, in October, shifted to the North Atlantic lanes, escorting tankers and troop transports to England and France. She continued these runs until mid-May 1945 when she returned to New York to be refitted for duty in the Pacific. She stood out of New York on 20 June for a 10-day training period at Guantanamo Bay, Cuba, and onward routing via the Panama Canal to Hawaii.

==== Pacific War ====
Strickland arrived at Pearl Harbor on 25 July and was conducting training exercises when Japan capitulated. She escorted an aircraft carrier to Eniwetok, Marshall Islands, on 29 August, and accompanied three merchant ships from there to Japan, arriving in Tokyo Bay on 2 October. She sailed from there to Guam and, until January 1946, visited Iwo Jima, Truk, and Okinawa. She returned to San Diego, California, on 25 January 1946 and was routed to the East Coast for inactivation. Strickland arrived at Philadelphia, Pennsylvania, on 11 February and moved down to Charleston, South Carolina, the following month. She remained at Charleston from 10 March to 5 December when she was towed to Green Cove Springs, Florida. The destroyer was decommissioned on 15 June and placed in reserve with the Atlantic Fleet.

=== Cold War ===
In December 1950, the Navy decided to reactivate the ship and convert her into a radar picket escort ship. Strickland was towed to Norfolk, Virginia, on 29 March 1951 for conversion. She was recommissioned as DER-333 on 2 February 1952. After shakedown off Guantánamo Bay, the destroyer returned to Norfolk for availability from 1 to 27 June; and then reported to Escort Squadron 16 at Newport, Rhode Island, where she began duty with the Eastern Air Defense Command.

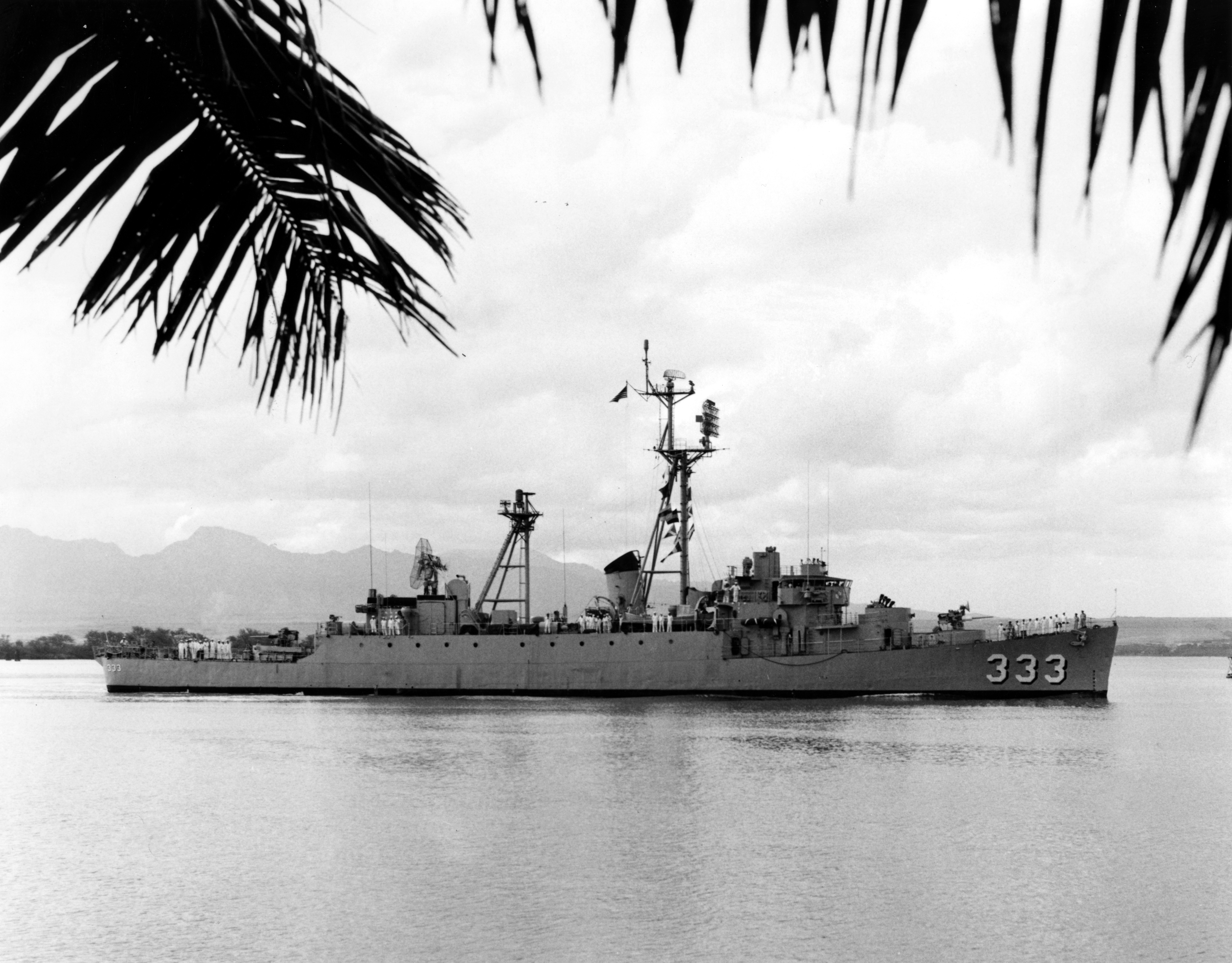
Strickland in 1958.

With her new and complex electronics installation, Strickland worked hand-in-hand with the U.S. Air Force in a network of radar stations that were scanning the coasts of the United States. Operating from her homeport, the ship served at various picket stations on the North Atlantic seaboard until October 1955 when she was overhauled at the New York Naval Shipyard. With updated radar equipment, Strickland held training off Guantanamo Bay; then returned to Newport on 18 March 1956 for assignment to the picket line. During the summer of 1956, she had the distinction of being the first DER to man a regularly assigned picket station on the Distant Early Warning (DEW) line. She continued her picket duties in the Atlantic until July 1957.

On 15 July, Strickland, with four other DERs, stood out of Newport en route to the Pacific. They arrived at Pearl Harbor, her new homeport, on 18 August. The ship then began patrolling picket stations on the Pacific extension of the DEW line. From 2 October 1957 to 24 March 1958, she was in Pearl Harbor. After installation of stronger radar and communications systems, she returned to her former duties on the barrier stations in the Pacific Ocean area until ordered to return to the United States for inactivation.

=== Decommissioning and fate ===
Strickland was decommissioned on 17 June 1959 and assigned to the Reserve Fleet. She was struck from the Naval Vessel Register on 1 December 1972 and sold for scrapping to the West Waterway Lumber Company, Seattle, Washington (USA), on 13 August 1974.

== Awards ==
Strickland received one battle star for World War II service.
