= USS Jacob Jones =

Three ships of the United States Navy have been named USS Jacob Jones, in honor of Jacob Jones:

- USS Jacob Jones (DD-61), was a Tucker-class destroyer, commissioned in 1916 and sunk by a torpedo in December 1917
- USS Jacob Jones (DD-130), was a Wickes-class destroyer, commissioned in 1919 and sunk by torpedoes in February 1942
- USS Jacob Jones (DE-130), was an Edsall-class destroyer escort, commissioned 1943 and decommissioned in 1946

== See also ==
- USS Jones
