= USS Price =

United States Navy destroyer escort

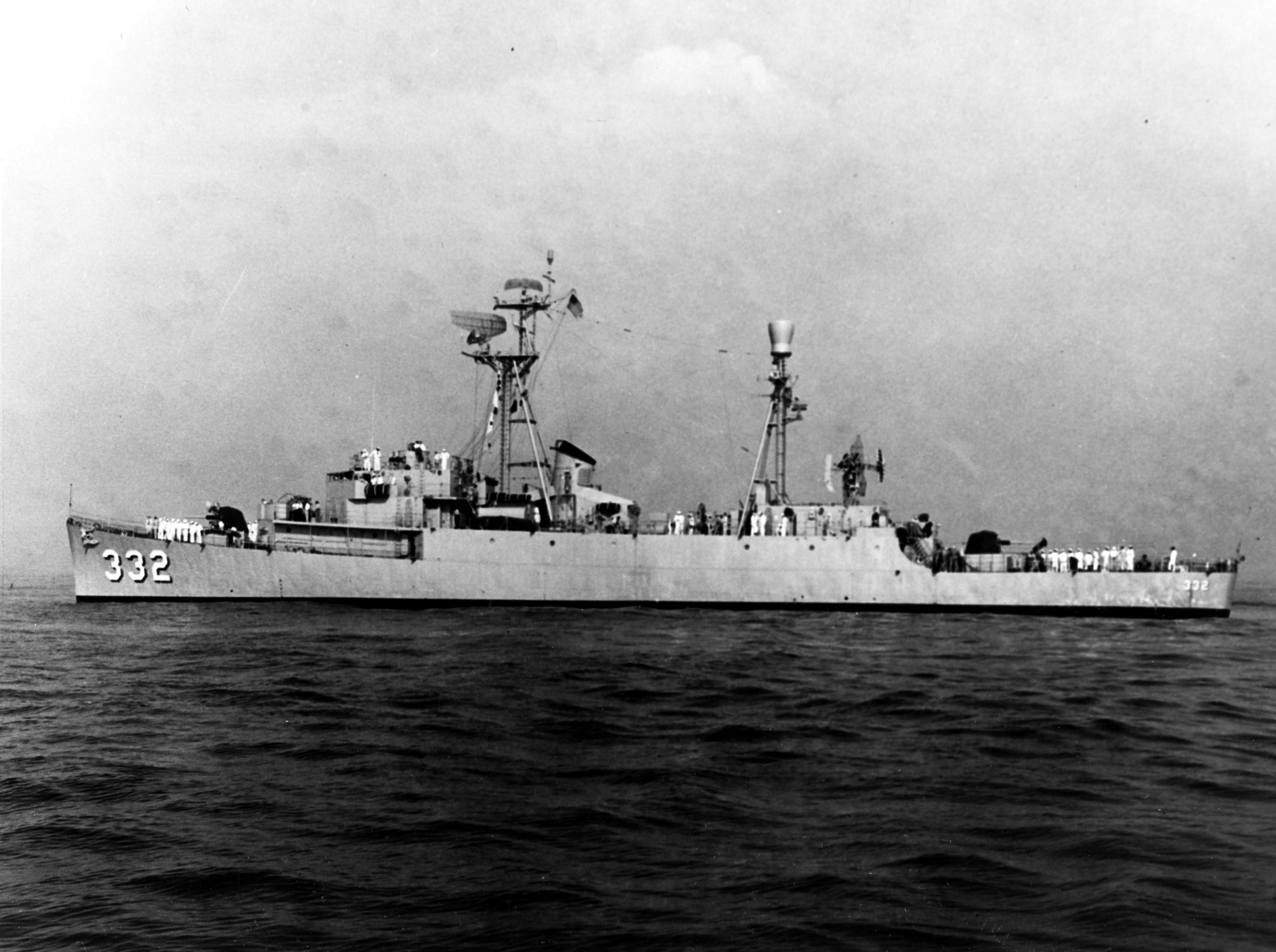

History

United States
- Namesake: Edward Max Price
- Builder: Consolidated Steel Corporation, Orange, Texas
- Laid down: 24 August 1943
- Launched: 30 October 1943
- Commissioned: 12 January 1944
- Decommissioned: 30 June 1960
- Reclassified: DER-332, 21 October 1955
- Stricken: 1 August 1974
- Fate: Sold for scrapping 12 March 1975

General characteristics
- Class & type: Edsall-class destroyer escort
- Displacement: 1,253 tons standard; 1,590 tons full load
- Length: 306 feet (93.27 m)
- Beam: 36.58 feet (11.15 m)
- Draft: 10.42 full load feet (3.18 m)
- Propulsion: 4 FM diesel engines, 4 diesel-generators, 6,000 shp (4.5 MW), 2 screws
- Speed: 21 knots (39 km/h)
- Range: 9,100 nmi. at 12 knots; (17,000 km at 22 km/h)
- Complement: 8 officers, 201 enlisted
- Armament: 3 × single 3 in (76 mm)/50 guns; 1 × twin 40 mm AA guns; 8 × single 20 mm AA guns; 1 × triple 21 in (533 mm) torpedo tubes; 8 × depth charge projectors; 1 × depth charge projector (hedgehog); 2 × depth charge tracks

USS Price (DE-332) was an Edsall-class destroyer escort in service with the United States Navy from 1943 to 1947 and from 1956 to 1960. She was scrapped in 1975.

== Namesake ==
Edward Max Price was born on 20 June 1916 in Richmond, Virginia. He was appointed Midshipman on 16 July 1935, commissioned Ensign on 1 June 1939, and promoted to Lieutenant (junior grade) on 1 November 1941. He served on board USS Lexington and was killed in action in the Battle of the Coral Sea on 8 May 1942.

== History ==
Price was laid down by the Consolidated Steel Corp., Orange, Texas, 24 August 1943; launched 30 October 1943; sponsored by Mrs. Ray P. Reynolds; and commissioned 12 January 1944.

=== World War II ===
==== Battle of the Atlantic ====
After shakedown off Bermuda, Price departed Norfolk, Virginia, on convoy escort duty 23 March. On the night of 11 April German planes attacked in force, leaving USS Holder (DE-401) dead in the water from a torpedo hit. Price shot down one plane, then escorted Holder, towed by rescue tug HMS Mindful, into Algiers, before continuing on to Bizerte, Tunisia. She then escorted a return convoy to the United States, subsequently escorting two more convoys to Bizerte.

On 28 September, she was detached from task force TF 65, and with the rest of Escort Division 58, was assigned to task group TG 21.7 and duty escorting vital convoys across the stormy North Atlantic. By 29 May 1945 she had escorted five convoys across the Atlantic and back.

==== Pacific War ====
With the end of European hostilities she was transferred to the Pacific and arrived Pearl Harbor 27 July. On 31 August she got underway for Eniwetok as plane guard and escort for USS Kula Gulf. She subsequently put into Ulithi, Guam, and Okinawa. On 6 December she departed Guam for Iwo Jima and Chichi Jima where she established the military occupation of the Bonin and Volcano Islands.

She departed Chichi Jima 9 January 1946 on a "Magic Carpet" run to the United States. Embarking veterans at Iwo Jima, Guam, and Pearl Harbor, she carried them to San Pedro, Los Angeles, then sailed for the East Coast. She reached Boston, Massachusetts, 21 February, and in late March headed south to Green Cove Springs, Florida. Decommissioned 16 May 1947, she remained there, a unit of the Atlantic Reserve Fleet until reactivated in 1955.

=== Cold War ===
Converted to a radar picket escort on her reactivation, she was redesignated DER–332, 21 October 1955. Price recommissioned at New York 1 August 1956 and reported for duty with CortRon 18 at Newport, Rhode Island, 11 September. For the next three and a half years she patrolled the Atlantic Barrier from north of Newfoundland, and south from the English Channel to the Azores. This duty was interrupted by a schedule of training cruises to waters off Cuba, Bermuda, and, the Virginia Capes and in December 1959 by SAR duty for President Dwight D. Eisenhower's flight home from Paris.

=== Decommissioning and fate ===
She was placed in commission in reserve at Orange, Texas, 1 April 1960 and was decommissioned there 30 June 1960. She remained in the Atlantic Reserve Fleet until struck from the Navy List on 1 August 1974. She was sold for scrapping 12 March 1975.

== Awards ==
Price received one battle star for World War II service.
