= JPJ =

JPJ may refer to:

- Jalalpur Jattan, a city in Punjab, Pakistan
- Jackson Powers-Johnson, American football player
- Joey Porter Jr. (born 2000), American professional football cornerback
- John Paul Jackson (1950-2015), American author, teacher, conference speaker and founder of Streams Ministries International
- John Paul Jones (1747–1792), Scottish sailor known for his service in the American and Russian navies
- John Paul Jones (musician) (born 1946), English musician
- John Paul Jones Arena, in Charlottesville, Virginia, United States
- Malaysian Road Transport Department (Malay: Jabatan Pengangkutan Jalan Malaysia)
- USS John Paul Jones, several United States Navy vessels
