= USS O'Reilly =

1943 Edsall-class destroyer escort

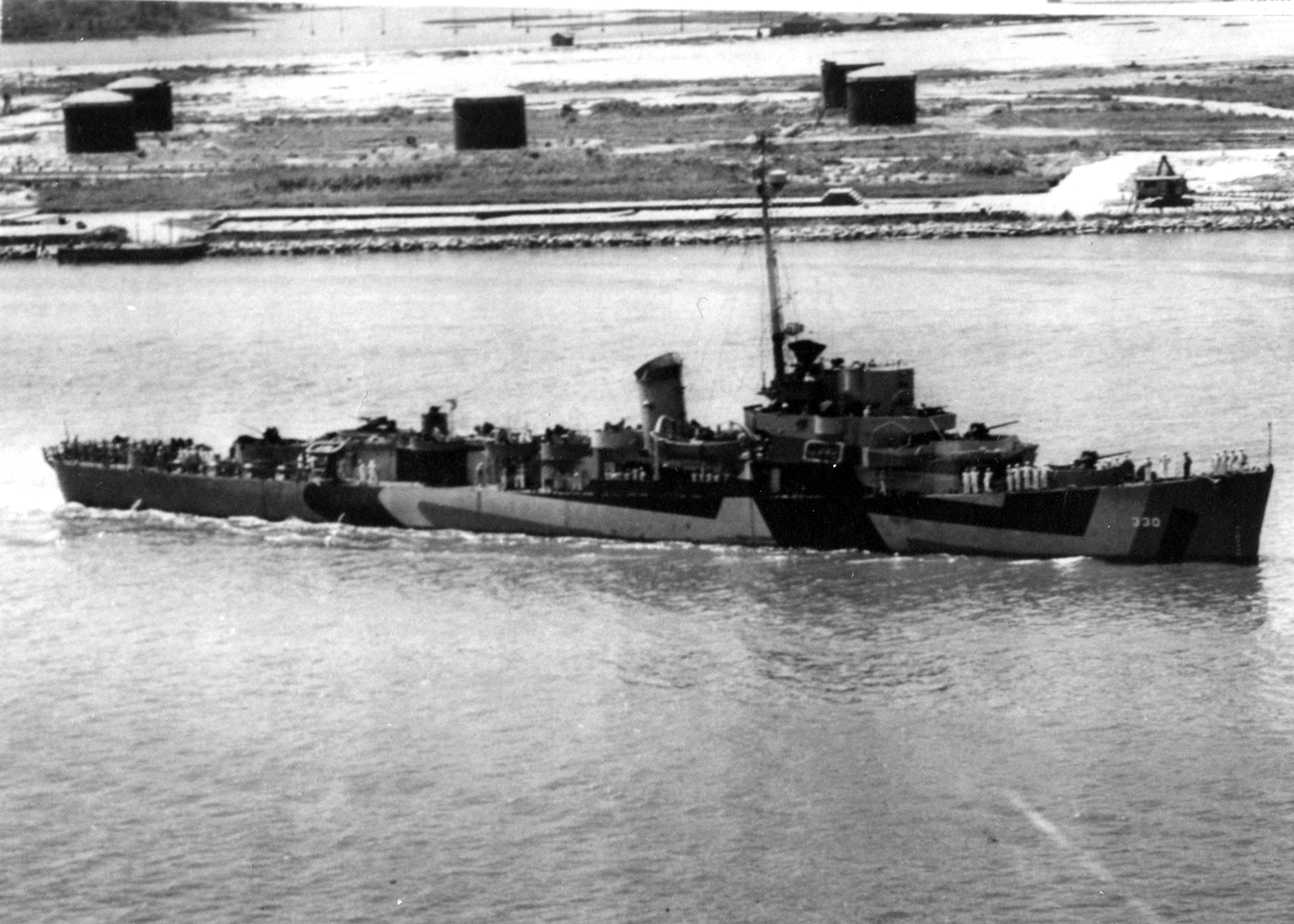

History

United States
- Namesake: Edward Joseph O'Reilly
- Builder: Consolidated Steel Corporation, Orange, Texas
- Laid down: 29 July 1943
- Launched: 2 October 1943
- Commissioned: 28 December 1943
- Decommissioned: 15 June 1946
- Stricken: 15 January 1971
- Fate: Sold for scrapping 10 April 1972

General characteristics
- Class & type: Edsall-class destroyer escort
- Displacement: 1,253 tons standard; 1,590 tons full load
- Length: 306 feet (93.27 m)
- Beam: 36.58 feet (11.15 m)
- Draft: 10.42 full load feet (3.18 m)
- Propulsion: 4 FM diesel engines, 4 diesel-generators, 6,000 shp (4.5 MW), 2 screws
- Speed: 21 knots (39 km/h)
- Range: 9,100 nmi. at 12 knots; (17,000 km at 22 km/h)
- Complement: 8 officers, 201 enlisted
- Armament: 3 × single 3 in (76 mm)/50 guns; 1 × twin 40 mm AA guns; 8 × single 20 mm AA guns; 1 × triple 21 in (533 mm) torpedo tubes; 8 × depth charge projectors; 1 × depth charge projector (hedgehog); 2 × depth charge tracks

USS O'Reilly (DE-330) was an Edsall-class destroyer escort in service with the United States Navy from 1943 to 1946. She was scrapped in 1972.

== Namesake ==
Edward Joseph O'Reilly was born on 16 August 1909 in Chicago, Illinois. He was commissioned regular Assistant Dental Surgeon with rank of Lieutenant (junior grade) on 10 February 1941. He saw training at the Naval Dental School, Washington, D.C., and the Naval Training Station, Great Lakes, Illinois, before reporting for duty on the USS Astoria in October. Appointed Passed Assistant Dental Surgeon and Lieutenant on 15 June 1942, he was lost when Astoria was sunk in the Battle of Savo Island on 9 August 1942.

== History ==
O'Reilly was laid down on 29 July 1943, by Consolidated Steel Corp., Orange, Texas; launched 14 November 1943; sponsored by Mrs. Bride O'Reilly, mother of Lieut. O'Reilly; and commissioned 28 December 1943.

=== Battle of the Atlantic ===
After fitting-out and sea trials in the Orange, Texas, and Galveston, Texas, O'Reilly left on 18 January 1944, for shakedown off Bermuda. This was followed by a ten-day availability in Charleston, South Carolina, before she sailed for Guantánamo Bay, Aruba, and Curaçao.

On 9 March O'Reilly picked up its first convoy, out of Curaçao, for Gibraltar and several North African ports, and arrived in Algiers on the 25th. It returned the following month, then made two more Mediterranean voyages from the West Indies and one from New York before undergoing repairs and upkeep at the New York Navy Yard in early September.

O'Reilly then switched convoy routes, and on 20 September began its first of five round trips across the North Atlantic to England. On 18 November, while heading to Plymouth, England, on the second of these, it attacked a submarine with unknown results. During its nine Atlantic crossings not one ship under its protection was lost to submarine or air attack.

=== Pacific War ===
In April 1945, with the European War well on the way to its conclusion, O'Reilly was ordered to the Pacific. It left New York on 24 May, transited the Panama Canal 8 June, and proceeded to Pearl Harbor after a brief stop at San Diego, California. It conducted five weeks of local training in Hawaiian waters then, on 1 August, sailed for Leyte Gulf with stops at Eniwetok and other islands. At Leyte it spent several weeks in upkeep, then sailed on a good-will tour via Okinawa to Shanghai and Taiwan.

While entering Buckner Bay, Okinawa, on 23 October, O'Reilly struck a reef with one of its propellers and threw a shaft out of alignment. it remained there until 2 December for repairs, then sailed for Los Angeles, California, arriving the 22nd.

=== Decommissioning and fate ===
On 16 January 1946, it departed for New York and there underwent pre-inactivation availability. It decommissioned 15 June 1946 and joined the Reserve Fleet at Green Cove Springs, Florida. During 1961 she shifted to Orange, Texas. She was struck from the Navy List on 15 January 1971 and sold for scrapping 10 April 1972.
