= USS Harveson =

1943 Edsall-class destroyer escort

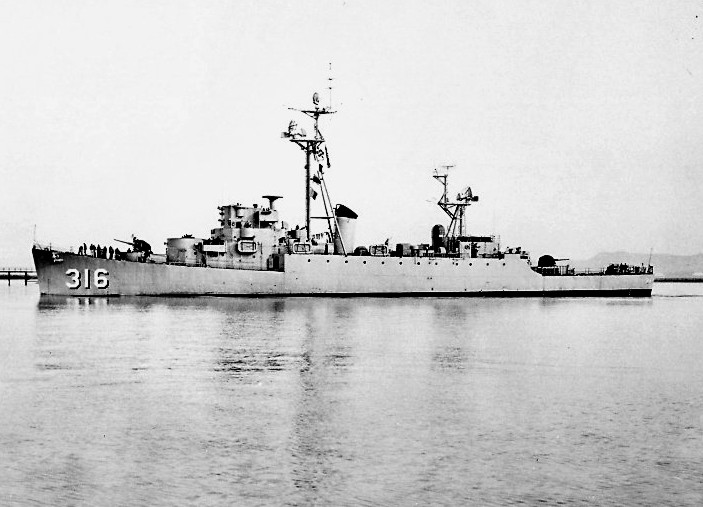
- USS Harveson (DER-316) in 1951

History

United States
- Namesake: Herold Aloysius Harveson
- Builder: Consolidated Steel Corporation, Orange, Texas
- Laid down: 9 March 1943
- Launched: 22 May 1943
- Commissioned: 12 October 1943
- Decommissioned: 30 June 1960
- Reclassified: DER-316, 13 September 1950
- Stricken: 1 December 1966
- Fate: Sunk as target off California 10 October 1967

General characteristics
- Class & type: Edsall-class destroyer escort
- Displacement: 1,253 tons standard; 1,590 tons full load
- Length: 306 feet (93.27 m)
- Beam: 36.58 feet (11.15 m)
- Draft: 10.42 full load feet (3.18 m)
- Propulsion: 4 FM diesel engines, 4 diesel-generators, 6,000 shp (4.5 MW), 2 screws
- Speed: 21 knots (39 km/h)
- Range: 9,100 nmi. at 12 knots; (17,000 km at 22 km/h)
- Complement: 8 officers, 201 enlisted
- Armament: 3 × single 3 in (76 mm)/50 guns; 1 × twin 40 mm AA guns; 8 × single 20 mm AA guns; 1 × triple 21 in (533 mm) torpedo tubes; 8 × depth charge projectors; 1 × depth charge projector (hedgehog); 2 × depth charge tracks

USS Harveson (DE-316) was an Edsall-class destroyer escort built for the U.S. Navy during World War II. She served in the Atlantic Ocean the Pacific Ocean and provided destroyer escort protection against submarine and air attack for Navy vessels and convoys.

== Namesake ==
Harold Aloysius Harveson was born on 7 August 1913 at Lake Charles, Louisiana. He graduated from the United States Naval Academy on 3 June 1937. After serving in Louisville and on the staff of the Pacific Fleet Scouting Force, Lieutenant (junior grade) Harveson was assigned to USS Utah on 19 August 1941. Operating out of Pearl Harbor, the aged ex-battleship, converted to a target ship, served the fleet as the major antiaircraft training ship, as well as for developing carrier air-to-ship attack tactics. During the Japanese Attack on Pearl Harbor on 7 December 1941, Utah was torpedoed twice early in the attack, overturned and sank by 08:12 killing Harveson.

== Construction and commissioning ==
She was laid down by Consolidated Steel Corp., Orange, Texas, 9 March 1943; launched 22 May 1943; sponsored by Mrs. T. L. Herlong, mother; and commissioned at Orange 12 October 1943.

== World War II North Atlantic operations ==
Manned entirely by a U.S. Coast Guard crew, Harveson completed shakedown out of Bermuda. Off Bermuda she was damaged when rammed by Canadian fishing vessel O. K. Service on 25 November 1943. On 15 December, Harveson was seriously damaged when she collided with SS William T. Barry on a foggy night off the Virginia Capes. Repairs were completed at Portsmouth, Virginia, by February 1944, and the destroyer-escort joined Escort Division 22. Departing New York 1 March, Harveson escorted a convoy to Derry, Northern Ireland, via Halifax. In the next 14 months she escorted nine more convoys carrying vitally needed supplies for the European theatre safely across the dangerous North Atlantic.

== Transfer to the Pacific Fleet ==
When V-E Day came, CortDiv 22 was ordered to the Pacific; and Harveson reached Pearl Harbor via the Panama Canal and San Diego, California, 11 July to begin refresher training. Harveson was still engaged in tactical training at Pearl Harbor when Japan capitulated, but soon she participated in the occupation of the defeated enemy's homeland.

== End-of-War activity ==
Departing harbor 3 September, she escorted a convoy of LSTs to Japan, where she arrived Sasebo 24 September. During the next few weeks she operated along the coast of Honshū, escorting USS Mount McKinley and supporting occupation landings at Wakayama, Hiro, and Nagoya. She departed Yokohama, Japan, for the United States 4 November and arrived Jacksonville, Florida, in December for duty with the Atlantic Fleet She decommissioned at Green Cove Springs, Florida, 9 May 1947, and entered the Atlantic Reserve Fleet.

== Conversion to radar picket ship ==
Harveson was towed to the Mare Island Navy Yard in 1950 for conversion to a radar picket ship. She recommissioned at Vallejo, California, 12 February 1951 and, as the first of a new class of radar picket ships, she was redesignated DER-316. After intensive tests and vigorous tactical training, Harveson joined Escort Squadron 10 at Newport, Rhode Island, 30 May to begin duty as a radar picket ship. While on patrol, the former destroyer escort, outfitted with the most modern radar and early detection warning devices, cruised off the coast of the United States to provide adequate early warning of any enemy attack. From her usual station in the North Atlantic, Harveson also sailed to the Caribbean for frequent antisubmarine and tactical exercises.

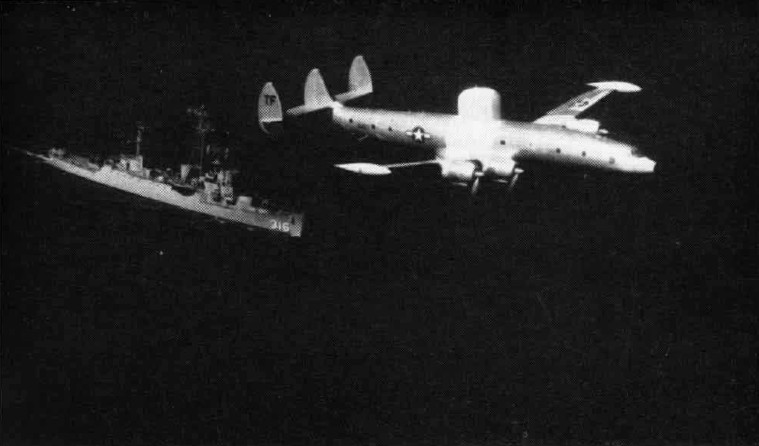
Harveson and a WV-2 in 1957.

Departing Newport 15 July 1957, Harveson reported for radar picket duty at Pearl Harbor 18 August. There she joined the Barrier Forces, Pacific Fleet, to strengthen America's warning system in the vast and lonely reaches of the Pacific.

== Final decommissioning ==
After almost 3 years of barrier patrols out of Hawaii, Harveson steamed to San Francisco, California, for in-activation. She decommissioned 30 June 1960 and joined the Pacific Reserve Fleet, Stockton, California. Her name was struck from the Navy List 1 December 1966. She was sunk as a target off California 10 October 1967.
