= USS Richey =

1943 Edsall-class destroyer escort

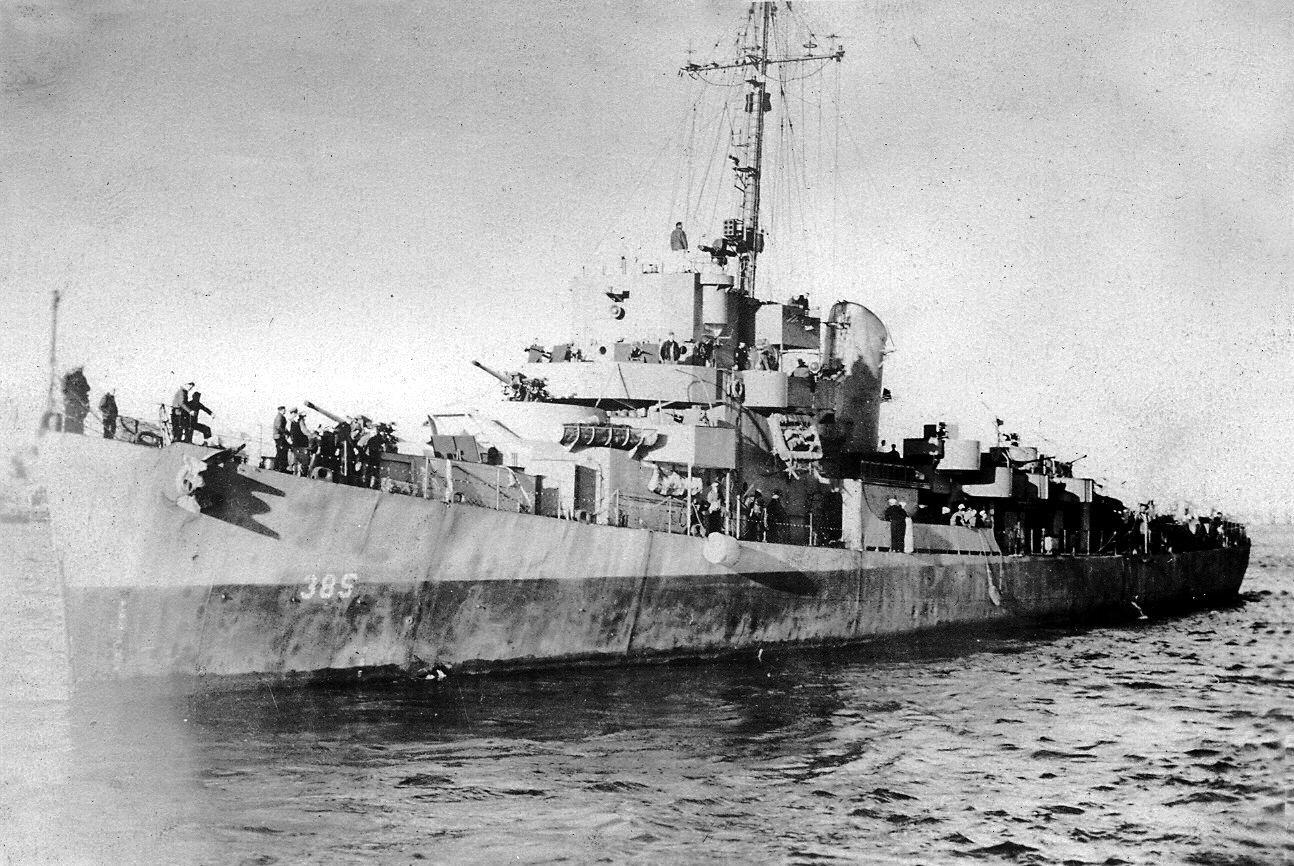
- USS Richey (DE-385) c. 1944

History

United States
- Namesake: Joseph Lee Richey
- Builder: Brown Shipbuilding, Houston, Texas
- Laid down: 19 April 1943
- Launched: 30 June 1943
- Commissioned: 30 October 1943
- Decommissioned: January 1947
- Stricken: 30 June 1968
- Fate: Sunk as target off California, July 1969

General characteristics
- Class & type: Edsall-class destroyer escort
- Displacement: 1,253 tons standard; 1,590 tons full load
- Length: 306 feet (93.27 m)
- Beam: 36.58 feet (11.15 m)
- Draft: 10.42 full load feet (3.18 m)
- Propulsion: 4 FM diesel engines, 4 diesel-generators, 6,000 shp (4.5 MW), 2 screws
- Speed: 21 knots (39 km/h)
- Range: 9,100 nmi. at 12 knots; (17,000 km at 22 km/h)
- Complement: 8 officers, 201 enlisted
- Armament: 3 × single 3 in (76 mm)/50 guns; 1 × twin 40 mm AA guns; 8 × single 20 mm AA guns; 1 × triple 21 in (533 mm) torpedo tubes; 8 × depth charge projectors; 1 × depth charge projector (hedgehog); 2 × depth charge tracks

USS Richey (DE-385) was an Edsall-class destroyer escort built for the U.S. Navy during World War II. She served in the Atlantic Ocean and the Pacific Ocean and provided destroyer escort protection against submarine and air attack for Navy vessels and convoys.

== Namesake ==
Joseph Lee Richey was born on 8 June 1920 in Barnard, Missouri. He enlisted in the United States Naval Reserve on 28 October 1940 and was commissioned Ensign on 26 August 1941. Following training at the Naval Air Station, Pensacola, Florida, that led to his designation as a naval aviator, he was assigned to Observation Squadron (VO) 2 on board the battleship USS California. He was killed 7 December 1941 during the Japanese attack on Pearl Harbor.

== Construction and commissioning ==
She was laid down 19 April 1943 by Brown Shipbuilding Co., Houston, Texas; launched 30 June 1943; sponsored by Mrs. Joseph Lee Richey; and commissioned 30 October 1943.

== World War II North Atlantic operations ==
Following shakedown off Bermuda USS Richey (DE-385) commenced convoy escort duty in the Atlantic. From January to July 1944, she escorted convoys from New York and Norfolk, Virginia, to Casablanca, Morocco; Oran, Algeria; and Bizerte, Tunisia. From September to October, she guarded convoys from New York to Belfast and Londonderry, Northern Ireland. From January 1945 to late May she escorted convoys between the United States, France, and Great Britain. That April, Richey rescued 32 men from two tankers that had collided and caught fire, SS Nasbulk and SS St. Mihiel.

== Transferred to the North Pacific Theatre ==
Following arrival in New York in May and overhaul, she proceeded via Cuba and the Panama Canal to the Pacific where she reported in July to the North Pacific Fleet at Adak, Alaska. In September she occupied the Japanese naval base at Ominato, northern Honshū, Japan. After a return to Adak, she sailed via Okinawa to Taku, China to assist the occupation forces.

== Post-War decommissioning ==
In March 1950 she entered the Atlantic Reserve Fleet. Loaned to the U.S. Coast Guard 1 April 1952, she was subsequently returned and entered the Pacific Reserve Fleet in June 1954, where she remained until struck from the Navy list 30 June 1968, and sunk as a target. During her Coast Guard service she was recommissioned as USCGC Richey (WDE-385) and assigned to ocean station duty, performing weather observation, search and rescue, and navigational assistance for transoceanic aircraft on 21-day patrol rotations in the North Atlantic. Navy destroyer escorts loaned to the Coast Guard during this period served as a cost-effective means of maintaining the international ocean station commitments established by the International Civil Aviation Organization in 1947.
