= USS Finch (DE-328) =

Edsall-class escort destroyer of the United States Navy

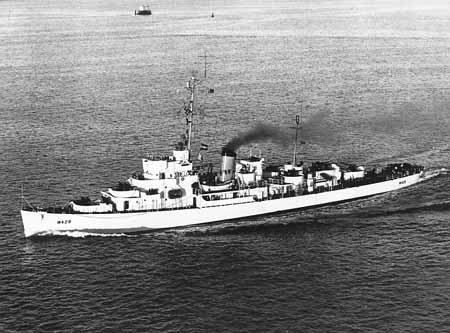
- USCGC Finch (WDE-428)

History

United States
- Namesake: Joseph W. Finch Jr.
- Builder: Consolidated Steel, Orange, Texas
- Laid down: 29 June 1943
- Launched: 28 August 1943
- Commissioned: 13 December 1943
- Decommissioned: 4 October 1946

History

United States
- Commissioned: 21 August 1951 as (WDE-428)
- Decommissioned: 23 April 1954

History

United States
- Commissioned: 17 September 1956
- Decommissioned: 1 October 1973
- Reclassified: as DER-328, 21 October 1955
- Stricken: 1 February 1974
- Fate: Scrapped, 27 September 1974

General characteristics
- Class & type: Edsall class escort destroyer
- Displacement: 1,253 tons standard; 1,590 tons full load
- Length: 306 feet (93.27 m)
- Beam: 36.58 feet (11.15 m)
- Draft: 10.42 full load feet (3.18 m)
- Propulsion: 2-shaft Fairbanks Morse diesels, 6,000 bhp
- Speed: 21 knots
- Range: 10,800 nautical miles (20,000 km) at 12 knots (14 mph; 22 km/h)
- Complement: 186
- Armament: 3 × 3 in (76 mm) guns; 2 × 40 mm; 8 × 20 mm; 3 × 21-inch (533 mm) torpedo tubes; 2 × depth charge tracks; 8 × K-gun depth charge projectors; 1 × hedge hog

USS Finch (DE-328) was an Edsall-class escort destroyer in the service of the United States Navy from 1943 to 1946 and from 1956 to 1969. From 1951 to 1954, she was loaned to the United States Coast Guard where she served as USCGC Finch (WDE-428). She was scrapped in 1974.

== Namesake ==
Joseph Warren Finch Jr. was born on 8 March 1920 in Chicago, Illinois. He was appointed Ensign in the United States Naval Reserve on 28 May 1941. He was killed in action in the Naval Battle of Guadalcanal, 13 November 1942, when his ship USS Laffey was sunk. Lieutenant (junior grade) Finch shared posthumously in the Presidential Unit Citation awarded to the Laffey for its outstanding performance in action against the Japanese in the Southwest Pacific from 15 September until its loss.

== History ==
Finch was first launched on 28 August 1943 at Orange, Texas, as DE-328; sponsored by Miss Grace Cushing, fiancée of Lieutenant Finch. She was commissioned three times. The ship was first commissioned on 13 December 1943, taking on its 182-man crew.

=== World War II ===
Finch arrived at Curaçao on 7 March 1944, and escorted two oil tanker convoys to Casablanca and Algiers until 31 May. After training in the Caribbean and in Casco Bay, she departed from Norfolk on 28 July. Finch escorted shipping to Naples for Operation Dragoon, the Allied invasion of southern France. She returned to New York City on 31 August. The ship escorted five convoys from New York and Boston to Great Britain between 29 September 1944 and 8 May 1945.

After the end of the war in the European theatre, Finch was transferred to the Pacific Fleet, arriving at Pearl Harbor on 12 July. She continued to Guam, becoming part of a carrier task force there on 13 August. Japan surrendered two days later, and Finch sailed to Leyte on 17 August. She participated in occupation duties, which included the evacuation of Allied prisoners of war in Korea to Formosa during September 1945.

During her operation from 28 August 1943 until 6 March 1947, Finch entered 63 ports from the eastern and western ports of the USA through the Atlantic Ocean, the Mediterranean Sea, and the Pacific Ocean. Finch participated in 18 convoys as an escort for a variety of naval and commercial ships. Finch entered drydock at Green Cove Springs, Florida, on 4 October 1946 but was not finally decommissioned until 6 March 1947.

=== Korean War ===
From 24 August 1951 to 23 April 1954, Finch was on loan to the United States Coast Guard and in commission as USCGC Finch (WDE-428). She served on weather station duty along the west coast and in the Far East during the Korean War.

=== Cold War ===
Upon her return to the U.S. Navy, she was converted to a radar picket escort vessel. She was reclassified DER-328 on 17 August 1956, and recommissioned 17 August 1956. Seattle was Finch's home port from 17 December 1956 through 10 September 1958, as she made regular patrols on seaborne radar early warning duty. She arrived at Pearl Harbor 16 September 1958 for similar duty until 16 May 1960, then sailed for San Francisco, her home port for barrier operations through 1962.

=== In popular culture ===
Finch appeared in the 1960 film The Wackiest Ship in the Army; NavSource identifies two scenes showing Finch moored outboard of USS Durant at Pearl Harbor.

In Tora! Tora! Tora!, the ship was used to portray USS Ward.

=== Decommissioning and fate ===
On 3 October 1969, Finch was decommissioned at the Puget Sound Naval Shipyard. She was stricken 1 February 1974, and sold for scrap 16 August 1974.
