= Edsall-class destroyer escort =

Class of American destroyer escorts

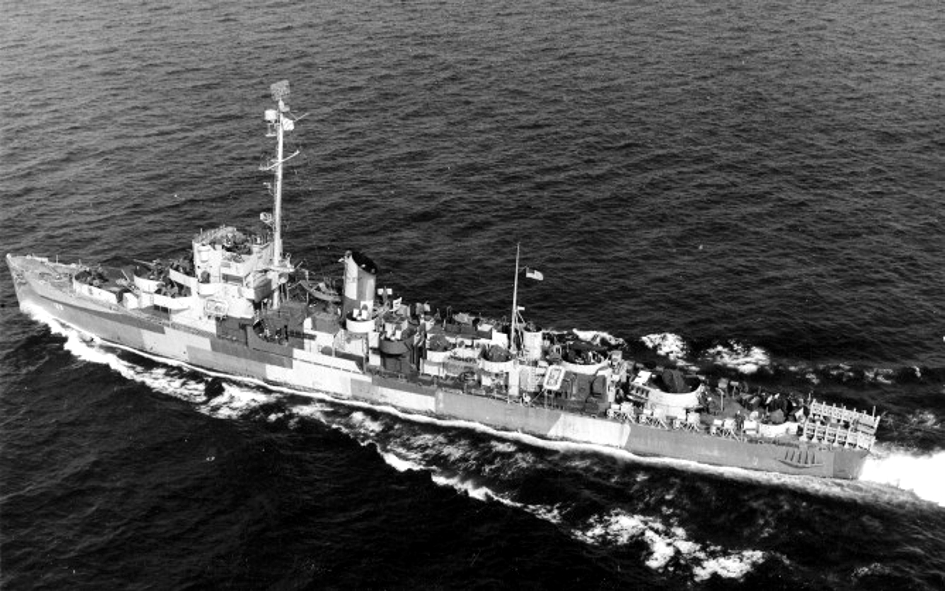
- USS Edsall

Class overview
- Name: Edsall class
- Builders: Consolidated Steel, TX (47); Brown Shipbuilding, TX (38)
- Operators: United States Navy; United States Coast Guard; Mexican Navy; Philippine Navy; Tunisian National Navy; Republic of Vietnam Navy; Vietnam People's Navy
- Preceded by: Cannon class
- Succeeded by: Rudderow class
- In commission: 1943–2015
- Planned: 85
- Completed: 85
- Lost: 5
- Retired: 84
- Scrapped: 75
- Preserved: 1

General characteristics
- Type: Destroyer escort
- Displacement: 1,253 tons standard; 1,590 tons full load
- Length: 306 ft (93.3 m)
- Beam: 36 ft 7 in (11.2 m)
- Draft: 10 ft 5 in (3.2 m)
- Propulsion: 2-shaft Fairbanks-Morse geared diesel engines, 6,000 bhp (4,500 kW)
- Speed: 21 kn (39 km/h; 24 mph)
- Range: 10,800 nmi (20,000 km; 12,400 mi) at 12 kn (22 km/h; 14 mph)
- Complement: 186
- Sensors & processing systems: 1 × SC radar
- Armament: 3 × single 3 in (76 mm)/50 guns; 1 × twin 40 mm AA guns; 8 × single 20 mm AA guns; 1 × triple 21 in (533 mm) torpedo tubes; 8 × depth charge projectors; 1 × depth charge projector (hedgehog); 2 × depth charge tracks

The Edsall-class destroyer escorts were destroyer escorts built primarily for ocean antisubmarine escort service during World War II. The lead ship, USS Edsall, was commissioned on 10 April 1943 at Orange, Texas. The class was also known as the FMR type from their Fairbanks-Morse reduction-geared diesel drive, with a type of engine used in the submarines of the time. The FMR's substitution for a diesel-electric power plant was the essential difference from the predecessor Cannon ("DET") class. This was the only World War II destroyer escort class in which all the ships originally ordered were completed as United States Navy destroyer escorts.

Destroyer escorts were regular companions escorting the vulnerable cargo ships. Late in the war, plans were made to replace the 3-inch (76 mm) guns with 5-inch (127 mm) guns, but only Camp was refitted (after a collision). In total, all 85 were completed by two shipbuilding companies: Consolidated Steel Corporation, Orange, Texas (47), and Brown Shipbuilding, Houston, Texas (38). Most were en route to the Pacific Theater when Japan surrendered. One of the ships participated in Operation Dragoon and two were attacked by German guided missiles.

== Hull numbers ==
A total of 85 Edsall-class destroyer escorts were built.

- DE-129 through DE-152 Consolidated Steel Corporation, Orange, Texas
- DE-238 through DE-255 Brown Shipbuilding, Houston, Texas
- DE-316 through DE-338 Consolidated Steel Corporation, Orange, Texas
- DE-382 through DE-401 Brown Shipbuilding, Houston, Texas

=== Destroyed or damaged in combat ===
- USS Frederick C. Davis (DE-136) – sunk 24 April 1945 by U-546 in the North Atlantic
- USS Fiske (DE-143) – sunk 2 August 1944 by U-804 north of the Azores
- USS Leopold (DE-319) – torpedoed 9 March 1944 by U-255 south of Iceland
- USS Menges (DE-320) – torpedoed 20 April 1944 by U-371 off Algiers, damaged
- USS Holder (DE-401) – damaged 11 April 1944 off Algiers by German aircraft

=== Transferred to US Coast Guard from 1951 to 1954 ===
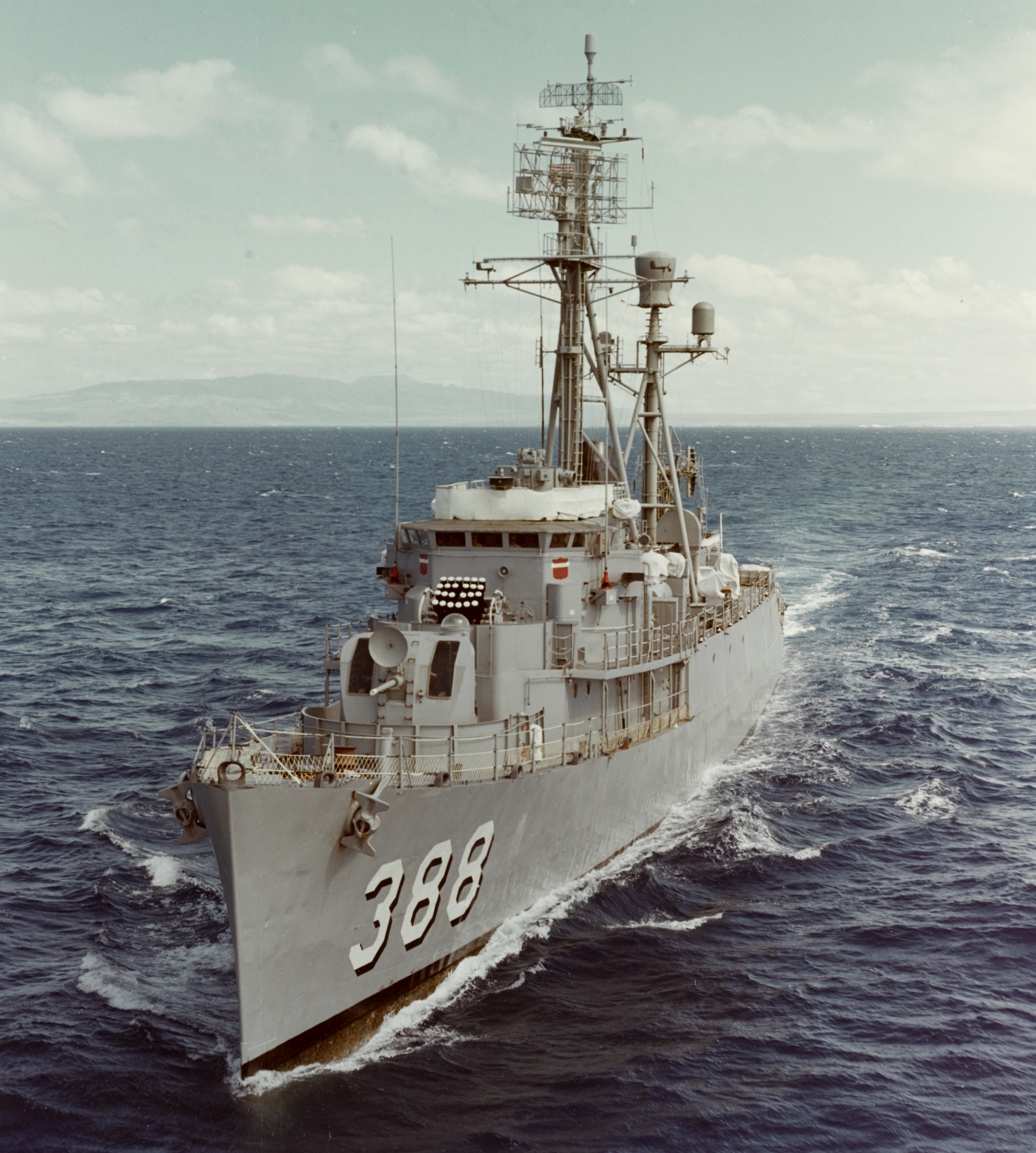
USS Lansing in 1963

- USS Newell (DE-322) – redesignated WDE-422
- USS Falgout (DE-324) – redesignated WDE-424
- USS Lowe (DE-325) – redesignated WDE-425
- USS Finch (DE-328) – redesignated WDE-428
- USS Koiner (DE-331) – redesignated WDE-431
- USS Forster (DE-334) – redesignated WDE-434
- USS Ramsden (DE-382) – redesignated WDE-482
- USS Richey (DE-385) – redesignated WDE-485
- USS Vance (DE-387) – redesignated WDE-487
- USS Lansing (DE-388) – redesignated WDE-488
- USS Durant (DE-389) – redesignated WDE-489
- USS Chambers (DE-391) – redesignated WDE-491

=== Transferred to other countries ===
- USS Hurst (DE-250) – transferred to the Mexican Navy as Comodoro Manuel Azueta (A06), last of class in active service (decommissioned 2015)
- USS Camp (DE-251) – transferred to South Vietnam as Tran Hung Dao. Later, to Philippines as BRP Rajah Lakandula (PF-4)
- USS Thomas J. Gary (DE-326) – transferred to Tunisia
- USS Forster (DE-334) – transferred to South Vietnam as Tran Khanh Du. Later, captured by North Vietnam and used as training vessel

=== Notable ships of class ===
- USS Pillsbury (DE-133) sister ship of USS Pope. Was in TG 22.3 with Pope and participated in the capture of U-boat U-505.
- USS Joyce (DE-317) Participated in the sinking of U-boat U-550.
- USS Peterson (DE-152) Also participated in the sinking of U-boat U-550.
- USS Pope (DE-134) was in Task Force 22.3 that was centered on escort carrier USS Guadalcanal, which captured German U-boat U-505.
- USS Flaherty (DE-135) was in TG 22.3 with Pope, Pillsbury and Chatelain and participated in the capture of U-505.
- USS Frederick C. Davis (DE-136) and USS Herbert C. Jones (DE-137) each received a Navy Unit Commendation for action during the Anzio campaign.
- USS Frost (DE-144) sank 5 German U-boats and awarded Presidential Unit Citation, 7 battle stars.
- USS Chatelain (DE-149) was in TG 22.3 with Pope and Pillsbury and participated in the capture of U-505.
- USS Stewart (DE-238) – the sole surviving example of the Edsall-class; a museum ship in Galveston, Texas.
- USS Kretchmer (DE-329) received a Navy Unit Commendation for action three days after the war ended.
- USS Stanton (DE-247) won two battle stars in a single engagement sinking two U-boats with the USS Frost (DE-144).

== Ships in Class ==
Construction data
Ship name	Hull no.	Builder	Laid down	Launched	Commissioned	Decommissioned	Fate
Edsall	DE-129	Consolidated Steel Corporation, Orange, Texas	2 July 1942	1 November 1942	10 April 1943	11 June 1946	Struck from Navy List 1 June 1968, sold for scrap in July 1969
Jacob Jones	DE-130	Consolidated Steel Corporation, Orange, Texas	16 June 1942	29 November 1942	29 April 1943	26 July 1946	Struck from Navy List 2 January 1971, sold for scrap 22 August 1973
Hammann) (ex-Langley)	DE-131	Consolidated Steel Corporation, Orange, Texas	10 July 1942	13 December 1942	17 May 1943	24 October 1945	Struck from Navy List 1 October 1972, sold for scrap 18 January 1974
Robert E. Peary	DE-132	Consolidated Steel Corporation, Orange, Texas	30 June 1942	2 January 1943	31 May 1943	13 June 1947	Struck from Navy List 1 July 1966, sold for scrap 6 September 1967
Pillsbury	DE-133	Consolidated Steel Corporation, Orange, Texas	18 July 1942	10 January 1943	7 June 1943	1 May 1947	Reclassified DER-133 in August 1954. Struck from Navy List 1 July 1965, sold for scrap in 1966
Pillsbury	DE-133	Consolidated Steel Corporation, Orange, Texas	18 July 1942	10 January 1943	15 March 1955	20 June 1960	Reclassified DER-133 in August 1954. Struck from Navy List 1 July 1965, sold for scrap in 1966
Pope	DE-134	Consolidated Steel Corporation, Orange, Texas	14 July 1942	12 January 1943	25 June 1943	17 May 1946	Struck from Navy List 2 January 1971, sold for scrap 22 August 1973
Flaherty	DE-135	Consolidated Steel Corporation, Orange, Texas	7 November 1942	17 January 1943	26 June 1943	17 June 1946	Struck from Navy List 1 April 1965, sold for scrap 4 November 1966
Frederick C. Davis	DE-136	Consolidated Steel Corporation, Orange, Texas	9 November 1942	24 January 1943	14 July 1943	—N/a	Torpedoed and sunk by German U-546 in Western Atlantic on 24 April 1945
Herbert C. Jones	DE-137	Consolidated Steel Corporation, Orange, Texas	30 November 1942	19 January 1943	21 July 1943	2 May 1947	Struck from Navy List 1 July 1972, sold for scrap 19 July 1973
Douglas L. Howard	DE-138	Consolidated Steel Corporation, Orange, Texas	8 December 1942	24 January 1943	29 July 1943	17 June 1946	Struck from Navy List 1 October 1972, sold for scrap 14 May 1974
Farquhar	DE-139	Consolidated Steel Corporation, Orange, Texas	14 December 1942	13 February 1943	5 August 1943	14 June 1946	Struck from Navy List 1 October 1972, sold for scrap 21 March 1974
J. R. Y. Blakely	DE-140	Consolidated Steel Corporation, Orange, Texas	16 December 1942	7 March 1943	16 August 1943	14 June 1946	Struck from Navy List 2 January 1971, sold for scrap 22 August 1973
Hill	DE-141	Consolidated Steel Corporation, Orange, Texas	21 December 1942	28 February 1943	16 August 1943	7 June 1946	Struck from Navy List 1 October 1972, sold for scrap 18 January 1974
Fessenden	DE-142	Consolidated Steel Corporation, Orange, Texas	4 January 1943	9 March 1943	25 August 1943	24 June 1946	Reclassified DER-142 1 October 1951. Struck from Navy List 1 September 1966, sunk as a target off Pearl Harbor, Hawaii on 20 December 1967
Fessenden	DE-142	Consolidated Steel Corporation, Orange, Texas	4 January 1943	9 March 1943	4 March 1952	30 June 1960	Reclassified DER-142 1 October 1951. Struck from Navy List 1 September 1966, sunk as a target off Pearl Harbor, Hawaii on 20 December 1967
Fiske	DE-143	Consolidated Steel Corporation, Orange, Texas	4 January 1943	14 March 1943	25 August 1943	—N/a	Torpedoed and sunk by German U-804 north of the Azores on 2 August 1944
Frost	DE-144	Consolidated Steel Corporation, Orange, Texas	13 January 1943	21 March 1943	30 August 1943	18 June 1946	Struck from Navy List 1 April 1965, sold for scrap 29 December 1966
Huse	DE-145	Consolidated Steel Corporation, Orange, Texas	11 January 1943	23 March 1943	30 August 1943	27 March 1946	Struck from Navy List 1 August 1973, sold for scrap 24 June 1974
Huse	DE-145	Consolidated Steel Corporation, Orange, Texas	11 January 1943	23 March 1943	3 August 1951	30 June 1965	Struck from Navy List 1 August 1973, sold for scrap 24 June 1974
Inch	DE-146	Consolidated Steel Corporation, Orange, Texas	19 January 1943	4 April 1943	8 September 1943	17 May 1946	Struck from Navy List 1 October 1972, sold for scrap 21 March 1974
Blair	DE-147	Consolidated Steel Corporation, Orange, Texas	19 January 1943	6 April 1943	13 September 1943	28 June 1946	Reclassified DER-147 1 November 1956. Struck from Navy List 1 December 1972, sold for scrap 20 September 1974
Blair	DE-147	Consolidated Steel Corporation, Orange, Texas	19 January 1943	6 April 1943	5 October 1951	13 November 1956	Reclassified DER-147 1 November 1956. Struck from Navy List 1 December 1972, sold for scrap 20 September 1974
Blair	DE-147	Consolidated Steel Corporation, Orange, Texas	19 January 1943	6 April 1943	2 December 1957	15 June 1960	Reclassified DER-147 1 November 1956. Struck from Navy List 1 December 1972, sold for scrap 20 September 1974
Brough	DE-148	Consolidated Steel Corporation, Orange, Texas	22 January 1943	10 April 1943	18 September 1943	22 March 1946	Struck from Navy List 1 November 1965, sold for scrap 13 October 1966
Brough	DE-148	Consolidated Steel Corporation, Orange, Texas	22 January 1943	10 April 1943	7 September 1951	30 June 1965	Struck from Navy List 1 November 1965, sold for scrap 13 October 1966
Chatelain	DE-149	Consolidated Steel Corporation, Orange, Texas	25 January 1943	21 April 1943	22 September 1943	14 June 1946	Struck from Navy List 1 August 1973, sold for scrap 24 June 1974
Neunzer	DE-150	Consolidated Steel Corporation, Orange, Texas	29 January 1943	27 April 1943	27 September 1943	January 1947	Struck from Navy List 1 July 1972, sold for scrap 1 November 1973
Poole	DE-151	Consolidated Steel Corporation, Orange, Texas	13 February 1943	8 May 1943	29 September 1943	January 1947	Struck from Navy List 2 January 1971, sold for scrap 30 January 1974
Peterson	DE-152	Consolidated Steel Corporation, Orange, Texas	28 February 1943	15 May 1943	29 September 1943	1 May 1946	Struck from Navy List 1 August 1973, sold for scrap in 1974
Peterson	DE-152	Consolidated Steel Corporation, Orange, Texas	28 February 1943	15 May 1943	2 May 1952	June 1965	Struck from Navy List 1 August 1973, sold for scrap in 1974
Stewart	DE-238	Brown Shipbuilding, Houston, Texas	15 July 1942	22 November 1942	31 May 1943	January 1947	Struck from Navy List 1 October 1972; Donated as a museum ship in Galveston, Texas on 25 June 1974
Sturtevant	DE-239	Brown Shipbuilding, Houston, Texas	15 July 1942	3 December 1942	16 June 1943	24 March 1946	Reclassified DER-239 1 November 1956. Struck from Navy List 1 December 1972, sold for scrap 20 September 1973
Sturtevant	DE-239	Brown Shipbuilding, Houston, Texas	15 July 1942	3 December 1942	3 August 1951	31 October 1956	Reclassified DER-239 1 November 1956. Struck from Navy List 1 December 1972, sold for scrap 20 September 1973
Sturtevant	DE-239	Brown Shipbuilding, Houston, Texas	15 July 1942	3 December 1942	5 October 1957	June 1960	Reclassified DER-239 1 November 1956. Struck from Navy List 1 December 1972, sold for scrap 20 September 1973
Moore	DE-240	Brown Shipbuilding, Houston, Texas	20 July 1942	21 December 1942	1 July 1943	30 June 1947	Struck from Navy List 1 August 1973, sunk as a target off Virginia on 13 June 1975
Keith (ex-Scott)	DE-241	Brown Shipbuilding, Houston, Texas	4 August 1942	21 December 1942	19 July 1943	20 September 1946	Struck from Navy List 1 November 1972, sold for scrap in 1973
Tomich	DE-242	Brown Shipbuilding, Houston, Texas	15 September 1942	28 December 1942	27 July 1943	20 September 1946	Struck from Navy List 1 November 1972, sold for scrap 20 January 1974
J. Richard Ward (ex-James R. Ward)	DE-243	Brown Shipbuilding, Houston, Texas	30 September 1942	6 January 1943	5 July 1943	13 June 1946	Struck from Navy List 2 January 1971, sold for scrap 10 April 1972
Otterstetter	DE-244	Brown Shipbuilding, Houston, Texas	9 November 1942	19 January 1943	6 August 1943	21 September 1946	Reclassified DER-244 in December 1951. Struck from Navy List 1 August 1974, sunk as a target off Puerto Rico on 15 February 1976
Otterstetter	DE-244	Brown Shipbuilding, Houston, Texas	9 November 1942	19 January 1943	6 June 1952	20 June 1960	Reclassified DER-244 in December 1951. Struck from Navy List 1 August 1974, sunk as a target off Puerto Rico on 15 February 1976
Sloat	DE-245	Brown Shipbuilding, Houston, Texas	21 November 1942	21 January 1943	16 August 1943	6 August 1947	Struck from Navy List 2 January 1971, sold for scrap 10 April 1972
Snowden	DE-246	Brown Shipbuilding, Houston, Texas	7 December 1942	19 February 1943	23 August 1943	29 March 1946	Struck from Navy List 23 September 1968, sunk as a target off Newport, Rhode Island 23 June 1969
Snowden	DE-246	Brown Shipbuilding, Houston, Texas	7 December 1942	19 February 1943	6 June 1951	August 1960	Struck from Navy List 23 September 1968, sunk as a target off Newport, Rhode Island 23 June 1969
Snowden	DE-246	Brown Shipbuilding, Houston, Texas	7 December 1942	19 February 1943	2 October 1961	23 September 1968	Struck from Navy List 23 September 1968, sunk as a target off Newport, Rhode Island 23 June 1969
Stanton	DE-247	Brown Shipbuilding, Houston, Texas	7 December 1942	21 February 1943	7 August 1943	2 June 1947	Struck from Navy List 1 December 1970
Swasey	DE-248	Brown Shipbuilding, Houston, Texas	30 December 1942	18 March 1943	31 August 1943	15 January 1946	Struck from Navy List 1 November 1972, sold for scrap 30 January 1974
Marchand	DE-249	Brown Shipbuilding, Houston, Texas	30 December 1942	20 March 1943	8 September 1943	25 April 1947	Struck from Navy List 2 January 1971, sold for scrap 30 January 1974
Hurst	DE-250	Brown Shipbuilding, Houston, Texas	27 January 1943	14 April 1943	30 August 1943	1 May 1946	Struck from Navy List 1 December 1972. Transferred to Mexico as Comodoro Manual Azueta on 1 October 1973
Camp	DE-251	Brown Shipbuilding, Houston, Texas	27 January 1943	16 April 1943	16 September 1943	1 May 1946	Reclassified DER-251 21 October 1951. Transferred to South Vietnam as Tran Hung Dao 13 February 1971. Struck from Navy List while in South Vietnamese service on 30 December 1975. Escaped to the Philippines and transferred to the Philippine Navy as Rajah Lakandula 5 April 1976
Camp	DE-251	Brown Shipbuilding, Houston, Texas	27 January 1943	16 April 1943	31 July 1956	13 February 1971	Reclassified DER-251 21 October 1951. Transferred to South Vietnam as Tran Hung Dao 13 February 1971. Struck from Navy List while in South Vietnamese service on 30 December 1975. Escaped to the Philippines and transferred to the Philippine Navy as Rajah Lakandula 5 April 1976
Howard D. Crow	DE-252	Brown Shipbuilding, Houston, Texas	6 February 1943	26 April 1943	27 September 1943	22 May 1946	Struck from Navy List 23 September 1968, sold for scrap in October 1970
Howard D. Crow	DE-252	Brown Shipbuilding, Houston, Texas	6 February 1943	26 April 1943	6 July 1951	23 September 1968	Struck from Navy List 23 September 1968, sold for scrap in October 1970
Pettit	DE-253	Brown Shipbuilding, Houston, Texas	6 February 1943	28 April 1943	23 September 1943	6 May 1946	Struck from Navy List 1 August 1973, sunk as a target off Puerto Rico on 30 September 1974
Ricketts	DE-254	Brown Shipbuilding, Houston, Texas	16 March 1943	10 May 1943	5 October 1943	17 April 1946	Struck from Navy List 1 November 1972, sold for scrap 18 January 1974
Sellstrom	DE-255	Brown Shipbuilding, Houston, Texas	16 March 1943	12 May 1943	12 October 1943	13 June 1946	Reclassified DER-255 21 October 1955. Struck from Navy List 1 November 1965, sold for scrap in April 1967
Sellstrom	DE-255	Brown Shipbuilding, Houston, Texas	16 March 1943	12 May 1943	1 October 1956	June 1960	Reclassified DER-255 21 October 1955. Struck from Navy List 1 November 1965, sold for scrap in April 1967
Harveson	DE-316	Consolidated Steel Corporation, Orange, Texas	9 March 1943	22 May 1943	12 October 1943	9 May 1947	Reclassified DER-316 13 September 1950. Struck from Navy List 1 December 1966, sunk as a target off California on 10 October 1967
Harveson	DE-316	Consolidated Steel Corporation, Orange, Texas	9 March 1943	22 May 1943	12 February 1951	30 June 1960	Reclassified DER-316 13 September 1950. Struck from Navy List 1 December 1966, sunk as a target off California on 10 October 1967
Joyce	DE-317	Consolidated Steel Corporation, Orange, Texas	8 March 1943	26 May 1943	30 September 1943	1 May 1946	Reclassified DER-317 13 September 1950. Struck from Navy List 1 December 1972, sold for scrap 11 September 1973
Joyce	DE-317	Consolidated Steel Corporation, Orange, Texas	8 March 1943	26 May 1943	28 February 1951	17 June 1960	Reclassified DER-317 13 September 1950. Struck from Navy List 1 December 1972, sold for scrap 11 September 1973
Kirkpatrick	DE-318	Consolidated Steel Corporation, Orange, Texas	15 March 1943	5 June 1943	23 October 1943	1 May 1946	Reclassified DER-318 1 October 1951. Struck from Navy List 1 August 1974, sold for scrap 12 March 1975
Kirkpatrick	DE-318	Consolidated Steel Corporation, Orange, Texas	15 March 1943	5 June 1943	23 February 1952	24 June 1960	Reclassified DER-318 1 October 1951. Struck from Navy List 1 August 1974, sold for scrap 12 March 1975
Leopold	DE-319	Consolidated Steel Corporation, Orange, Texas	24 March 1943	12 June 1943	18 October 1943	—N/a	Torpedoed and sunk by German U-255 south of Iceland on 10 March 1944
Menges	DE-320	Consolidated Steel Corporation, Orange, Texas	22 March 1943	15 June 1943	26 October 1943	January 1947	Torpedoed in stern by German U-371 in the Gulf of Bougie on 3 May 1944; stern repaired at Brooklyn Navy Yard using the stern of the damaged Holder and returned to service 26 September 1944. Struck from Navy List 2 January 1971, sold for scrapping 10 April 1972.
Mosley	DE-321	Consolidated Steel Corporation, Orange, Texas	6 April 1943	26 June 1943	30 October 1943	15 March 1946	Struck from Navy List 2 January 1971, sold for scrap 22 August 1973
Newell	DE-322	Consolidated Steel Corporation, Orange, Texas	5 April 1943	29 June 1943	30 October 1943	20 November 1945	Commissioned into the United States Coast Guard as USCGC Newell (WDE-422) on 20 July 1951. Decommissioned from the USCG and returned to the US Navy 1 June 1954. Reclassified DER-322 1 November 1956. Struck from Navy List 23 September 1968, sold for scrap 15 December 1971
Newell	DE-322	Consolidated Steel Corporation, Orange, Texas	5 April 1943	29 June 1943	20 August 1957	21 September 1968	Commissioned into the United States Coast Guard as USCGC Newell (WDE-422) on 20 July 1951. Decommissioned from the USCG and returned to the US Navy 1 June 1954. Reclassified DER-322 1 November 1956. Struck from Navy List 23 September 1968, sold for scrap 15 December 1971
Pride	DE-323	Consolidated Steel Corporation, Orange, Texas	12 April 1943	3 July 1943	13 November 1943	26 April 1946	Commissioned into the United States Coast Guard as USCGC Pride (WDE-423) on 20 July 1951. Decommissioned from the USCG and returned to the US Navy 1 June 1954. Struck from Navy List 2 January 1971, sold for scrap 30 January 1974
Falgout	DE-324	Consolidated Steel Corporation, Orange, Texas	26 May 1943	24 July 1943	15 November 1943	18 April 1947	Commissioned into the United States Coast Guard as USCGC Falgout (WDE-424) on 24 August 1951. Decommissioned from the USCG and returned to the US Navy 21 May 1954. Reclassified DER-324 28 October 1954. Struck from Navy List 1 June 1975, sunk as a target off California 12 January 1977
Falgout	DE-324	Consolidated Steel Corporation, Orange, Texas	26 May 1943	24 July 1943	30 June 1955	10 October 1969	Commissioned into the United States Coast Guard as USCGC Falgout (WDE-424) on 24 August 1951. Decommissioned from the USCG and returned to the US Navy 21 May 1954. Reclassified DER-324 28 October 1954. Struck from Navy List 1 June 1975, sunk as a target off California 12 January 1977
Lowe	DE-325	Consolidated Steel Corporation, Orange, Texas	24 May 1943	28 July 1943	22 November 1943	1 May 1946	Commissioned into the United States Coast Guard as USCGC Lowe (WDE-425) on 20 July 1951. Decommissioned from the USCG and returned to the US Navy 1 June 1954. Reclassified DER-325 28 October 1954. Struck from Navy List 23 September 1968, sold for scrap 3 September 1969
Lowe	DE-325	Consolidated Steel Corporation, Orange, Texas	24 May 1943	28 July 1943	15 January 1955	23 September 1968	Commissioned into the United States Coast Guard as USCGC Lowe (WDE-425) on 20 July 1951. Decommissioned from the USCG and returned to the US Navy 1 June 1954. Reclassified DER-325 28 October 1954. Struck from Navy List 23 September 1968, sold for scrap 3 September 1969
Thomas J. Gary (ex-Gary)	DE-326	Consolidated Steel Corporation, Orange, Texas	15 June 1943	21 August 1943	27 November 1943	7 March 1947	Renamed from Gary 1 January 1945 to free the name for Light Cruiser CL-147. Reclassified DER-326 1 November 1956. Struck from Navy List 22 October 1973. Transferred to Tunisia and renamed President Bourgiba on 22 October 1973
Thomas J. Gary (ex-Gary)	DE-326	Consolidated Steel Corporation, Orange, Texas	15 June 1943	21 August 1943	2 August 1957	22 October 1973	Renamed from Gary 1 January 1945 to free the name for Light Cruiser CL-147. Reclassified DER-326 1 November 1956. Struck from Navy List 22 October 1973. Transferred to Tunisia and renamed President Bourgiba on 22 October 1973
Brister (ex-O'Toole)	DE-327	Consolidated Steel Corporation, Orange, Texas	14 June 1943	24 August 1943	30 November 1943	4 October 1946	Reclassified DER-327 21 October 1955. Struck from Navy List 23 September 1968, sold for scrap 3 November 1971
Brister (ex-O'Toole)	DE-327	Consolidated Steel Corporation, Orange, Texas	14 June 1943	24 August 1943	21 July 1956	21 September 1968	Reclassified DER-327 21 October 1955. Struck from Navy List 23 September 1968, sold for scrap 3 November 1971
Finch	DE-328	Consolidated Steel Corporation, Orange, Texas	29 June 1943	28 August 1943	13 December 1943	4 October 1946	Commissioned into the United States Coast Guard as USCGC Finch (WDE-428) on 21 August 1951. Decommissioned from the USCG and returned to the US Navy 23 April 1954. Reclassified DER-328 21 October 1955. Struck from Navy List 1 February 1974, sold for scrap 27 September 1974
Finch	DE-328	Consolidated Steel Corporation, Orange, Texas	29 June 1943	28 August 1943	17 September 1956	1 October 1973	Commissioned into the United States Coast Guard as USCGC Finch (WDE-428) on 21 August 1951. Decommissioned from the USCG and returned to the US Navy 23 April 1954. Reclassified DER-328 21 October 1955. Struck from Navy List 1 February 1974, sold for scrap 27 September 1974
Kretchmer	DE-329	Consolidated Steel Corporation, Orange, Texas	28 June 1943	31 August 1943	27 December 1943	20 September 1946	Reclassified DER-329 21 October 1955. Struck from Navy List 30 September 1973, sold for scrap 14 May 1974
Kretchmer	DE-329	Consolidated Steel Corporation, Orange, Texas	28 June 1943	31 August 1943	22 September 1956	1 October 1973	Reclassified DER-329 21 October 1955. Struck from Navy List 30 September 1973, sold for scrap 14 May 1974
O'Reilly	DE-330	Consolidated Steel Corporation, Orange, Texas	29 July 1943	2 October 1943	28 December 1943	15 June 1946	Struck from Navy List 15 January 1971, sold for scrap 10 April 1972
Koiner	DE-331	Consolidated Steel Corporation, Orange, Texas	26 July 1943	5 October 1943	27 December 1943	4 October 1946	Commissioned into the United States Coast Guard as USCGC Koiner (WDE-431) on 20 June 1951. Decommissioned from the USCG and returned to the US Navy 14 May 1954. Reclassified DER-328 28 October 1954. Struck from Navy List 23 September 1968, sold for scrap 3 September 1969
Koiner	DE-331	Consolidated Steel Corporation, Orange, Texas	26 July 1943	5 October 1943	26 August 1955	23 September 1968	Commissioned into the United States Coast Guard as USCGC Koiner (WDE-431) on 20 June 1951. Decommissioned from the USCG and returned to the US Navy 14 May 1954. Reclassified DER-328 28 October 1954. Struck from Navy List 23 September 1968, sold for scrap 3 September 1969
Price	DE-332	Consolidated Steel Corporation, Orange, Texas	24 August 1943	30 October 1943	12 January 1944	16 May 1947	Reclassified DER-332 21 October 1955. Struck from Navy List 1 August 1974, sold for scrap 12 March 1975
Price	DE-332	Consolidated Steel Corporation, Orange, Texas	24 August 1943	30 October 1943	1 August 1956	30 June 1960	Reclassified DER-332 21 October 1955. Struck from Navy List 1 August 1974, sold for scrap 12 March 1975
Strickland	DE-333	Consolidated Steel Corporation, Orange, Texas	23 August 1943	2 November 1943	10 January 1944	15 June 1946	Reclassified DER-333 1 October 1951. Struck from Navy List 1 December 1972, sold for scrap 10 September 1974
Strickland	DE-333	Consolidated Steel Corporation, Orange, Texas	23 August 1943	2 November 1943	2 February 1952	17 June 1960	Reclassified DER-333 1 October 1951. Struck from Navy List 1 December 1972, sold for scrap 10 September 1974
Forster	DE-334	Consolidated Steel Corporation, Orange, Texas	31 August 1943	13 November 1943	25 January 1944	15 June 1946	Commissioned into the United States Coast Guard as USCGC Forster (WDE-434) on 29 June 1951. Decommissioned from the USCG and returned to the US Navy 25 May 1954. Reclassified DER-334 21 October 1955. Struck from Navy List 25 September 1971. Transferred to South Vietnam and renamed Tran Khanh Du on 25 September 1971. Captured by North Vietnam and renamed Dai Ky 29 April 1975, retained in Vietnamese service after fall of South Vietnam
Forster	DE-334	Consolidated Steel Corporation, Orange, Texas	31 August 1943	13 November 1943	23 October 1956	25 September 1971	Commissioned into the United States Coast Guard as USCGC Forster (WDE-434) on 29 June 1951. Decommissioned from the USCG and returned to the US Navy 25 May 1954. Reclassified DER-334 21 October 1955. Struck from Navy List 25 September 1971. Transferred to South Vietnam and renamed Tran Khanh Du on 25 September 1971. Captured by North Vietnam and renamed Dai Ky 29 April 1975, retained in Vietnamese service after fall of South Vietnam
Daniel	DE-335	Consolidated Steel Corporation, Orange, Texas	30 August 1943	16 November 1943	24 January 1944	12 April 1946	Struck from Navy List 15 January 1971, sold for scrap 30 January 1974
Roy O. Hale	DE-336	Consolidated Steel Corporation, Orange, Texas	13 September 1943	20 November 1943	3 February 1944	11 July 1946	Reclassified DER-336 21 October 1955. Struck from Navy List 1 August 1974, sold for scrap 12 March 1975
Roy O. Hale	DE-336	Consolidated Steel Corporation, Orange, Texas	13 September 1943	20 November 1943	29 January 1957	15 July 1963	Reclassified DER-336 21 October 1955. Struck from Navy List 1 August 1974, sold for scrap 12 March 1975
Dale W. Peterson	DE-337	Consolidated Steel Corporation, Orange, Texas	25 October 1943	22 December 1943	17 February 1944	27 March 1946	Struck from Navy List 2 January 1971, sold for scrap 10 April 1972
Martin H. Ray	DE-338	Consolidated Steel Corporation, Orange, Texas	27 October 1943	29 December 1943	28 February 1944	March 1946	Struck from Navy List 1 May 1966, sold for scrap 30 March 1967
Ramsden	DE-382	Brown Shipbuilding, Houston, Texas	26 March 1943	24 May 1943	19 October 1943	13 June 1946	Commissioned into the United States Coast Guard as USCGC Ramsden (WDE-482) on 1 April 1952. Decommissioned from the USCG and returned to the US Navy 28 June 1954. Reclassified DER-382 1 November 1956. Struck from Navy List 1 August 1974, later sunk as a target
Ramsden	DE-382	Brown Shipbuilding, Houston, Texas	26 March 1943	24 May 1943	10 December 1957	23 June 1960	Commissioned into the United States Coast Guard as USCGC Ramsden (WDE-482) on 1 April 1952. Decommissioned from the USCG and returned to the US Navy 28 June 1954. Reclassified DER-382 1 November 1956. Struck from Navy List 1 August 1974, later sunk as a target
Mills	DE-383	Brown Shipbuilding, Houston, Texas	26 March 1943	26 May 1943	12 October 1943	14 June 1946	Reclassified DER-383 on 1 November 1956. Struck from Navy List 1 August 1974, sold for scrap 12 March 1975
Mills	DE-383	Brown Shipbuilding, Houston, Texas	26 March 1943	26 May 1943	3 October 1957	27 October 1970	Reclassified DER-383 on 1 November 1956. Struck from Navy List 1 August 1974, sold for scrap 12 March 1975
Rhodes	DE-384	Brown Shipbuilding, Houston, Texas	19 April 1943	29 June 1943	25 October 1943	13 June 1946	Reclassified DER-384 on 28 October 1954. Struck from Navy List 1 August 1974, sold for scrap 12 March 1975
Rhodes	DE-384	Brown Shipbuilding, Houston, Texas	19 April 1943	29 June 1943	1 August 1955	10 July 1963	Reclassified DER-384 on 28 October 1954. Struck from Navy List 1 August 1974, sold for scrap 12 March 1975
Richey	DE-385	Brown Shipbuilding, Houston, Texas	19 April 1943	30 June 1943	30 October 1943	January 1947	Commissioned into the United States Coast Guard as USCGC Richey (WDE-485) on 1 April 1952. Decommissioned from the USCG and returned to the US Navy 28 June 1954. Struck from Navy List 30 June 1968, sunk as a target off California in July 1969
Savage	DE-386	Brown Shipbuilding, Houston, Texas	30 April 1943	15 July 1943	29 October 1943	13 June 1946	Reclassified DER-386 on 28 October 1954. Struck from Navy List 1 June 1975, sunk as a target off California 25 October 1982
Savage	DE-386	Brown Shipbuilding, Houston, Texas	30 April 1943	15 July 1943	18 February 1955	17 October 1969	Reclassified DER-386 on 28 October 1954. Struck from Navy List 1 June 1975, sunk as a target off California 25 October 1982
Vance	DE-387	Brown Shipbuilding, Houston, Texas	30 April 1943	16 July 1943	1 November 1943	27 February 1946	Commissioned into the United States Coast Guard as USCGC Vance (WDE-487) on 9 May 1952. Decommissioned from the USCG and returned to the US Navy 16 June 1954. Reclassified DER-387 21 October 1955. Struck from Navy List 1 June 1975, later sunk as a target in 1985
Vance	DE-387	Brown Shipbuilding, Houston, Texas	30 April 1943	16 July 1943	5 October 1956	10 October 1969	Commissioned into the United States Coast Guard as USCGC Vance (WDE-487) on 9 May 1952. Decommissioned from the USCG and returned to the US Navy 16 June 1954. Reclassified DER-387 21 October 1955. Struck from Navy List 1 June 1975, later sunk as a target in 1985
Lansing	DE-388	Brown Shipbuilding, Houston, Texas	15 May 1943	2 August 1943	10 November 1943	25 April 1946	Commissioned into the United States Coast Guard as USCGC Lansing (WDE-488) on 15 June 1952. Decommissioned from the USCG and returned to the US Navy 29 March 1954. Reclassified DER-388 21 October 1955. Struck from Navy List 1 February 1974, sold for scrap 16 August 1974
Lansing	DE-388	Brown Shipbuilding, Houston, Texas	15 May 1943	2 August 1943	18 December 1956	21 May 1965	Commissioned into the United States Coast Guard as USCGC Lansing (WDE-488) on 15 June 1952. Decommissioned from the USCG and returned to the US Navy 29 March 1954. Reclassified DER-388 21 October 1955. Struck from Navy List 1 February 1974, sold for scrap 16 August 1974
Durant	DE-389	Brown Shipbuilding, Houston, Texas	15 May 1943	3 August 1943	16 November 1943	27 February 1946	Commissioned into the United States Coast Guard as USCGC Durant (WDE-489) on 9 May 1952. Decommissioned from the USCG and returned to the US Navy 16 June 1954. Reclassified DER-389 7 December 1955. Struck from Navy List 1 April 1974, sold for scrap 16 August 1974
Durant	DE-389	Brown Shipbuilding, Houston, Texas	15 May 1943	3 August 1943	7 December 1956	June 1964	Commissioned into the United States Coast Guard as USCGC Durant (WDE-489) on 9 May 1952. Decommissioned from the USCG and returned to the US Navy 16 June 1954. Reclassified DER-389 7 December 1955. Struck from Navy List 1 April 1974, sold for scrap 16 August 1974
Calcaterra	DE-390	Brown Shipbuilding, Houston, Texas	28 May 1943	16 August 1943	17 November 1943	1 May 1946	Reclassified DER-390 28 October 1954. Struck from Navy List 2 July 1973, sold for scrap 14 May 1974
Calcaterra	DE-390	Brown Shipbuilding, Houston, Texas	28 May 1943	16 August 1943	12 September 1955	2 July 1973	Reclassified DER-390 28 October 1954. Struck from Navy List 2 July 1973, sold for scrap 14 May 1974
Chambers	DE-391	Brown Shipbuilding, Houston, Texas	28 May 1943	17 August 1943	22 November 1943	22 April 1946	Commissioned into the United States Coast Guard as USCGC Chambers (WDE-491) on 11 June 1952. Decommissioned from the USCG and returned to the US Navy 30 July 1954. Reclassified DER-391 28 October 1954. Struck from Navy List 1 March 1975, sold for scrap 24 September 1975
Chambers	DE-391	Brown Shipbuilding, Houston, Texas	28 May 1943	17 August 1943	1 June 1955	20 June 1960	Commissioned into the United States Coast Guard as USCGC Chambers (WDE-491) on 11 June 1952. Decommissioned from the USCG and returned to the US Navy 30 July 1954. Reclassified DER-391 28 October 1954. Struck from Navy List 1 March 1975, sold for scrap 24 September 1975
Merrill	DE-392	Brown Shipbuilding, Houston, Texas	1 July 1943	29 August 1943	27 November 1943	1 May 1946	Struck from Navy List 2 April 1971, sold for scrap 30 September 1974
Haverfield	DE-393	Brown Shipbuilding, Houston, Texas	1 July 1943	30 August 1943	29 November 1943	30 June 1947	Reclassified DER-393 2 September 1954. Struck from Navy List 2 June 1969, sold for scrap 15 December 1971
Haverfield	DE-393	Brown Shipbuilding, Houston, Texas	1 July 1943	30 August 1943	4 January 1955	2 June 1969	Reclassified DER-393 2 September 1954. Struck from Navy List 2 June 1969, sold for scrap 15 December 1971
Swenning	DE-394	Brown Shipbuilding, Houston, Texas	17 July 1943	13 September 1943	1 December 1943	18 June 1946	Struck from Navy List 1 July 1972, sold for scrap 17 January 1974
Willis	DE-395	Brown Shipbuilding, Houston, Texas	17 July 1943	14 September 1943	10 December 1943	14 June 1946	Struck from Navy List 1 July 1972, sold for scrap later in 1972
Janssen	DE-396	Brown Shipbuilding, Houston, Texas	4 August 1943	4 October 1943	18 December 1943	19 June 1946	Struck from Navy List 1 July 1972, sold for scrap 15 October 1973
Wilhoite	DE-397	Brown Shipbuilding, Houston, Texas	4 August 1943	5 October 1943	16 December 1943	19 June 1946	Reclassified DER-397 2 September 1954. Struck from Navy List 2 July 1969, sold for scrap 19 July 1972
Wilhoite	DE-397	Brown Shipbuilding, Houston, Texas	4 August 1943	5 October 1943	29 January 1955	2 July 1969	Reclassified DER-397 2 September 1954. Struck from Navy List 2 July 1969, sold for scrap 19 July 1972
Cockrill	DE-398	Brown Shipbuilding, Houston, Texas	31 August 1943	29 October 1943	24 December 1943	21 June 1946	Struck from Navy List 1 August 1973, sunk as a target off Florida on 19 November 1974
Stockdale	DE-399	Brown Shipbuilding, Houston, Texas	31 August 1943	30 October 1943	31 December 1943	15 June 1946	Struck from Navy List 1 July 1972, sunk as a target off Florida on 24 May 1974
Hissem	DE-400	Brown Shipbuilding, Houston, Texas	6 October 1943	26 December 1943	13 January 1944	15 June 1946	Reclassified DER-400 21 October 1955. Struck from Navy List 1 June 1975, sunk as a target off California on 24 February 1982
Hissem	DE-400	Brown Shipbuilding, Houston, Texas	6 October 1943	26 December 1943	31 August 1956	15 May 1970	Reclassified DER-400 21 October 1955. Struck from Navy List 1 June 1975, sunk as a target off California on 24 February 1982
Holder	DE-401	Brown Shipbuilding, Houston, Texas	6 October 1943	27 December 1943	18 January 1944	13 September 1944	Torpedoed by German aircraft northeast of Algiers on 11 April 1944. Struck from Navy List 23 September 1944. Stern used to repair Menges. Remainder of ship sold for scrap 19 June 1947
