= USS Martin H. Ray =

WWII US naval vessel

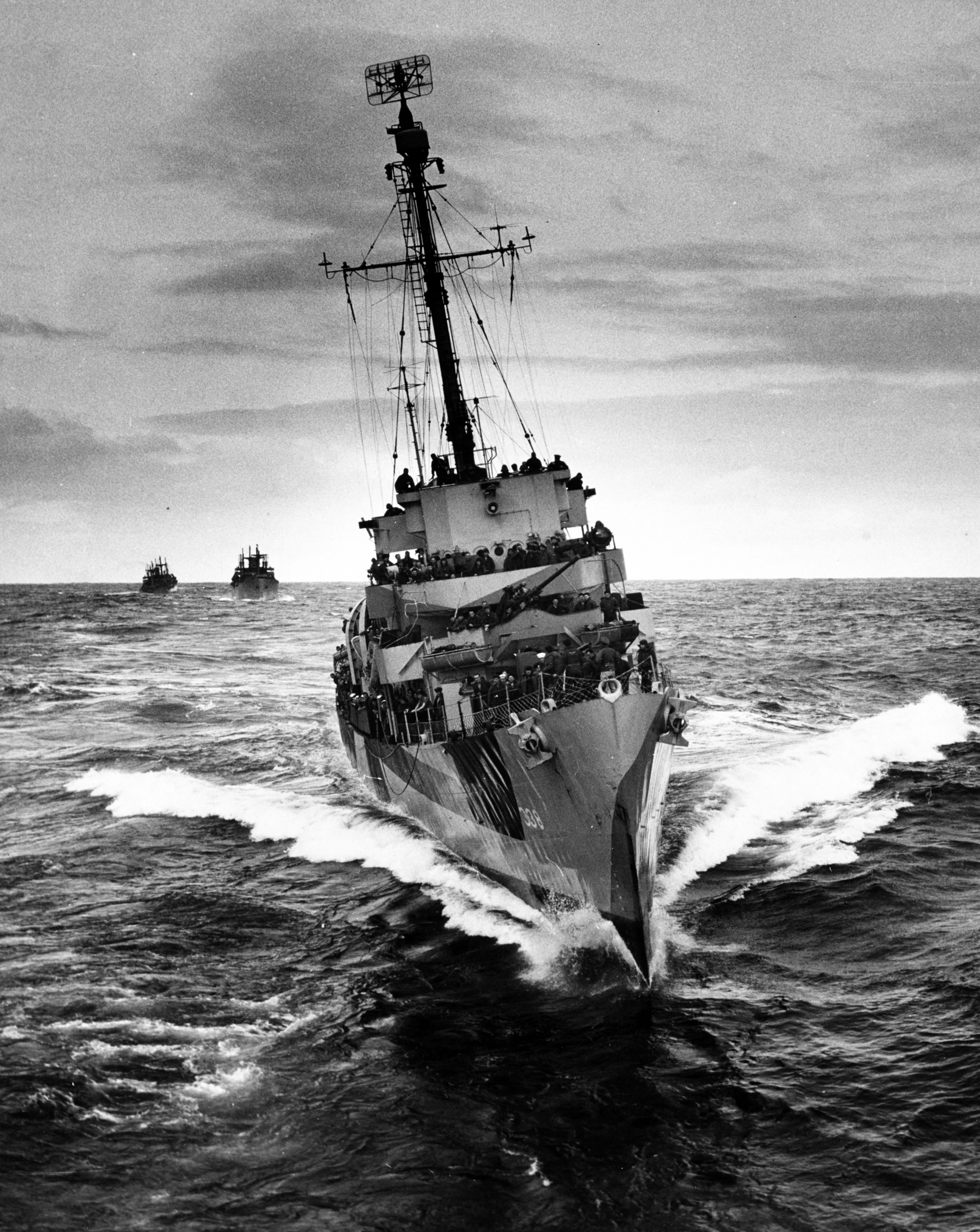

History

United States
- Namesake: Martin H. Ray, Jr.
- Builder: Consolidated Steel Corporation, Orange, Texas
- Laid down: 27 October 1943
- Launched: 29 December 1943
- Commissioned: 28 February 1944
- Decommissioned: March 1946
- Stricken: 1 May 1966
- Fate: Sold for scrapping 30 March 1967

General characteristics
- Class & type: Edsall-class destroyer escort
- Displacement: 1,253 tons standard; 1,590 tons full load
- Length: 306 feet (93.27 m)
- Beam: 36.58 feet (11.15 m)
- Draft: 10.42 full load feet (3.18 m)
- Propulsion: 4 FM diesel engines, 4 diesel-generators, 6,000 shp (4.5 MW), 2 screws
- Speed: 21 knots (39 km/h)
- Range: 9,100 nmi. at 12 knots; (17,000 km at 22 km/h)
- Complement: 8 officers, 201 enlisted
- Armament: 3 × single 3 in (76 mm)/50 guns; 1 × twin 40 mm AA guns; 8 × single 20 mm AA guns; 1 × triple 21 in (533 mm) torpedo tubes; 8 × depth charge projectors; 1 × depth charge projector (hedgehog); 2 × depth charge tracks

USS Martin H. Ray (DE-338) was an Edsall-class destroyer escort built for the U.S. Navy during World War II. She served in the Atlantic Ocean and the Pacific Ocean and provided destroyer escort protection against submarine and air attack for Navy vessels and convoys.

== Namesake ==
Martin H. Ray Jr. was born on 9 August 1913, in Philadelphia, Pennsylvania. He was educated in Yonkers, New York. After one year at New York University he entered the U.S. Naval Academy, graduating with the class of 1934. Following five years service on the battleship USS Pennsylvania, he received orders to USS Hammann in 1939.

While assisting the stricken USS Yorktown in the last stages of the Battle of Midway on 6 June 1942, Hammann was hit by an Imperial Japanese Navy torpedo. Lieutenant Ray as engineering officer died attempting to save the rapidly sinking vessel and evacuate the space below decks. He was posthumously awarded the Navy Cross.

== Construction and commissioning ==
She was laid down 27 October 1943 by Consolidated Steel Corp., Orange, Texas; launched 23 December 1943; sponsored by Mrs. M. H. Ray Jr., widow of Lt. Ray, and commissioned 28 February 1944.

== World War II North Atlantic operations ==
After a month's shakedown cruise to Bermuda, Martin H. Ray spent 3 weeks at Norfolk, Virginia, training prospective destroyer escort crews. June 1944 marked the beginning of a 12-month period in which not one ship was lost by the 14 convoys she escorted. Coastal assignments yielded to transatlantic voyages when she sailed from Norfolk, 1 July, bound for Naples, Italy. After two voyages to Italy she departed New York 20 October on the first of five voyages to the British Isles and France. Besides depth charging every probable submarine contact Martin H. Ray and the other escorts honed their professional effectiveness by additional training periods at the conclusion of each of these passages.

== Transfer to the Pacific Fleet ==
Following Nazi Germany's collapse, new orders directed the ship to Guantanamo Bay, Cuba, for training before joining the Pacific Fleet. She transited the Panama Canal. 2 August 1945, and was at Pearl Harbor when the conflict ceased. All abbreviated Operation Magic Carpet voyage terminated at San Diego, California, 11 September, with the debarkation of 58 military passengers.

== Post-War Decommissioning ==
Two days later she sailed to the Philadelphia Navy Yard to prepare for assignment to the Atlantic Reserve Fleet. Martin H. Ray decommissioned in March 1946, at Green Cove Springs, Florida, and was struck from the Navy list 1 May 1966. The following September she was scrapped.
