= USS Chambers =

Early Cold War-era U.S. destroyer escort

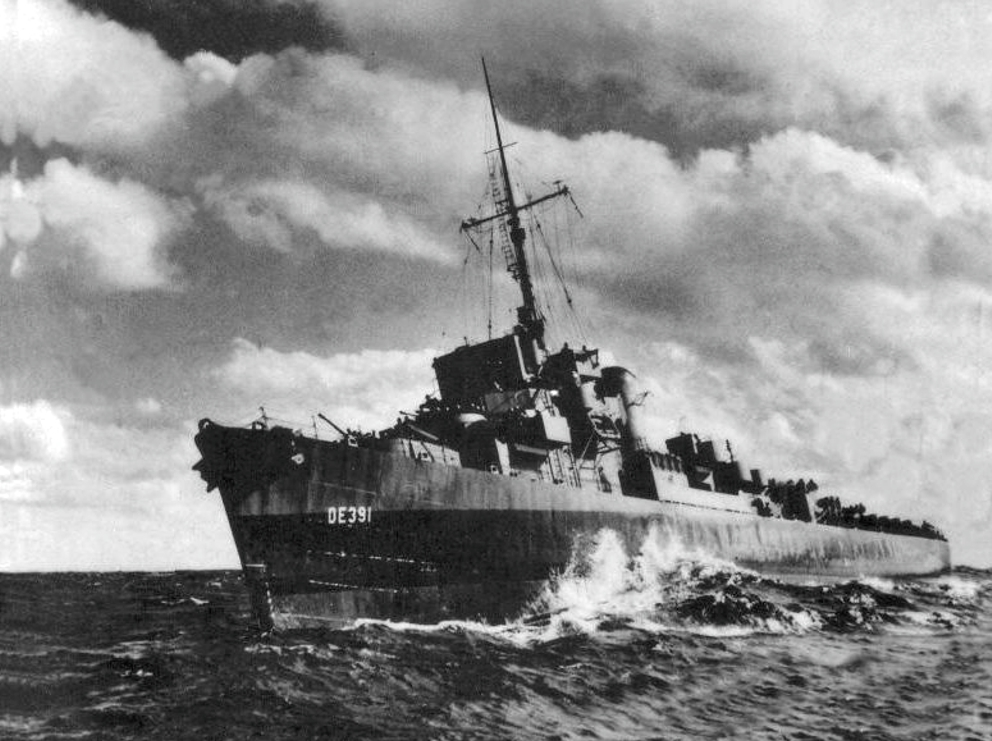

History

United States
- Name: Chambers
- Namesake: Russell Franklyn Chambers
- Builder: Brown Shipbuilding, Houston, Texas
- Laid down: 28 May 1943
- Launched: 17 August 1943
- Commissioned: 22 November 1943
- Decommissioned: 20 June 1960
- Reclassified: DER-391, 28 October 1954
- Stricken: 1 March 1975
- Fate: Sold for scrapping 24 September 1975

United States
- Name: USCGC Chambers WDE-491
- Commissioned: 11 June 1952
- Decommissioned: 30 July 1954
- Fate: Returned to USN, 30 July 1954

General characteristics
- Class & type: Edsall-class destroyer escort
- Displacement: 1,253 tons standard; 1,590 tons full load
- Length: 306 feet (93.27 m)
- Beam: 36.58 feet (11.15 m)
- Draft: 10.42 full load feet (3.18 m)
- Propulsion: 4 FM diesel engines, 4 diesel-generators, 6,000 shp (4.5 MW), 2 screws
- Speed: 21 knots (39 km/h)
- Range: 9,100 nmi. at 12 knots; (17,000 km at 22 km/h)
- Complement: 8 officers, 201 enlisted
- Armament: 3 × single 3 in (76 mm)/50 guns; 1 × twin 40 mm AA guns; 8 × single 20 mm AA guns; 1 × triple 21 in (533 mm) torpedo tubes; 8 × depth charge projectors; 1 × depth charge projector (hedgehog); 2 × depth charge tracks

USS Chambers (DE-391) was an Edsall-class destroyer escort in service with the United States Navy from 1943 to 1946 and from 1955 to 1960. From 1952 to 1954, she was loaned to the United States Coast Guard where she served as USCGC Chambers (WDE-491). She was finally scrapped in 1975.

== Namesake ==
Russell Franklyn Chambers was born on 10 June 1914 in La Habra, California. He was appointed aviation cadet, United States Naval Reserve on 5 December 1938 and commissioned Ensign on 4 November 1939. On duty in the Philippines when the United States entered World War II, he was reported missing in action 27 December 1941 after an engagement with Japanese aircraft over Jolo. He was officially declared dead 28 December 1942.

== History ==
Chambers was launched 17 August 1943 by Brown Shipbuilding Co., Houston, Texas; sponsored by Mrs. R. F. Chambers; commissioned 22 November 1943 and reported to the Atlantic Fleet.

=== World War II ===
After a period as training ship for prospective escort vessel crews, Chambers cleared Norfolk, Virginia, 13 February 1944 on the first of eight convoy escort crossings to North African ports from Norfolk, Virginia, and New York City. Steadfast to her important duty of guarding the men and materiel vital to the success of operations in the European theater, Chambers defied the hazards of the sea and the enemy to bring her charges safely to port.

On 8 July 1945 Chambers sailed from New York for Pearl Harbor, where she arrived 16 August to transport homeward bound servicemen to San Pedro, California. She put out to sea from San Pedro for the east coast 11 September, and on 22 April 1946, was decommissioned and placed in reserve at Green Cove Springs, Florida.

=== Cold War ===
==== U.S. Coast Guard service ====
Loaned to the United States Treasury Department, Chambers was commissioned as a Coast Guard ship 11 June 1952, and redesignated WDE-491. Operating from New Bedford, Massachusetts, she served on Atlantic weather patrols and made several cruises to Newfoundland until 30 July 1954, when the Coast Guard decommissioned her and returned her to the Navy. She also participated in the International Iceberg patrol.

==== Radar picket ship ====
Returned to reserve status, Chambers was reclassified DER-391 on 28 October 1954, and began conversion to a radar picket escort vessel. Chambers was recommissioned 1 June 1955 for radar picket duty out of Newport, Rhode Island She was assigned to the Atlantic Barrier Patrol in June 1956, with which she operated until placed out of commission in reserve 20 June 1960, at Philadelphia, Pennsylvania.

=== Final disposition and fate ===
On 1 March 1975 she was struck from the Navy list, and was sold for scrap on 24 September 1975.
