= USS Poole =

1943 Edsall-class destroyer escort

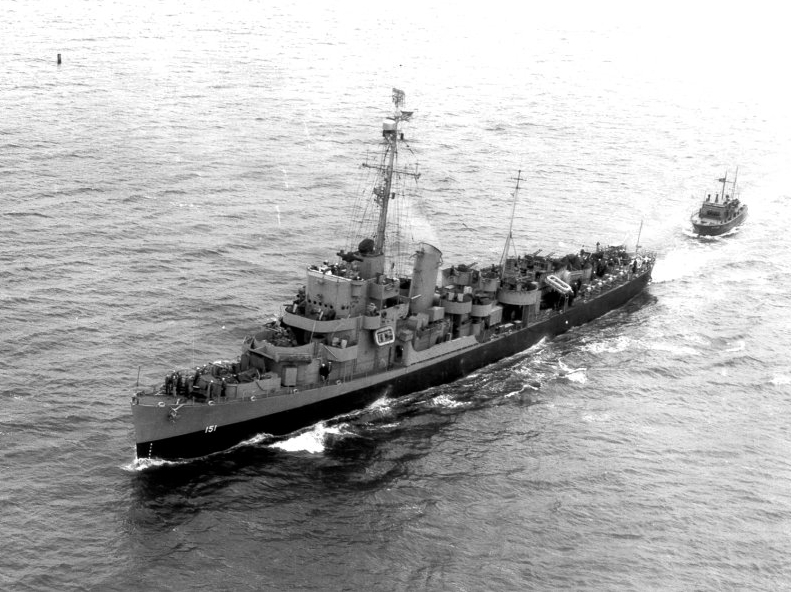

History

United States
- Namesake: Minor Butler Poole
- Builder: Consolidated Steel Corporation, Orange, Texas
- Laid down: 13 February 1943
- Launched: 8 May 1943
- Commissioned: 29 September 1943
- Decommissioned: January 1947
- Stricken: 2 January 1971
- Fate: Sold 30 January 1974, scrapped

General characteristics
- Class & type: Edsall-class destroyer escort
- Displacement: 1,253 tons standard; 1,590 tons full load
- Length: 306 feet (93.27 m)
- Beam: 36.58 feet (11.15 m)
- Draft: 10.42 full load feet (3.18 m)
- Propulsion: 4 FM diesel engines, 4 diesel-generators, 6,000 shp (4.5 MW), 2 screws
- Speed: 21 knots (39 km/h)
- Range: 9,100 nmi. at 12 knots; (17,000 km at 22 km/h)
- Complement: 8 officers, 201 enlisted
- Armament: 3 × single 3 in (76 mm)/50 guns; 1 × twin 40 mm AA guns; 8 × single 20 mm AA guns; 1 × triple 21 in (533 mm) torpedo tubes; 8 × depth charge projectors; 1 × depth charge projector (hedgehog); 2 × depth charge tracks

USS Poole (DE-151) was an Edsall-class destroyer escort in service with the United States Navy from 1943 to 1947. She was scrapped in 1974.

== Namesake ==
Minor Butler Poole was born on 2 February 1920, in Brandon, Mississippi. He enlisted in the United States Navy on 15 February 1938. During the Battle of Cape Esperance at Guadalcanal, Poole was in charge of the Forward Magazine Flooding Control Station aboard USS Boise. He died in an attempt to reach the flooding panel through overpowering gas fumes on 12 October 1942. He was posthumously awarded the Navy Cross.

== History ==
Poole was laid down by the Consolidated Steel Co., Orange, Texas, 13 February 1943; launched 8 May 1943; sponsored by Mrs. Minor Herndon Poole, mother of Minor Butler Poole. Poole's mother used a bottle filled with water from Liberty Creek in Mississippi to christen the ship instead of the traditional Champagne. She used it because her son learned to swim in the waters of the creek. Poole was commissioned 29 September 1943.

=== Battle of the Atlantic ===
Following shakedown off Bermuda, Poole took on coastwise escort duties, and toward the end of the year extended her escort services to transatlantic runs. She departed New York to escort a convoy to Casablanca, arriving 11 January 1944. Returning to New York 5 February, she shifted to the North Atlantic sea lanes and for the next 15 months escorted high speed convoys (tankers and transports) to ports in the United Kingdom and, after June 1944, on the European Continent. In August 1944 while enroute to New York, she logged a 72 degree roll to port and sustained minor damage in hurricane conditions.

=== Pacific War ===
On 4 June 1945, Escort Division 22, led by Poole, departed New York for the Pacific theater. Arriving at Pearl Harbor 14 July, she conducted patrols there for the remainder of the war. On 4 September she departed Pearl Harbor and proceeded to Saipan, thence to Honshū, where she joined the occupation forces.

=== Decommissioning and fate ===
After a month of occupation patrol duty off Wakayama, Japan, Poole was underway 29 October for San Diego, California, whence she steamed to the East Coast, reaching Charleston, South Carolina, 10 December. Later shifted to Green Cove Springs, Florida, she decommissioned in January 1947 and entered the Atlantic Reserve Fleet where she remained until she was stricken from the Navy list on 2 January 1971. She was sold 30 January 1974 and scrapped.
