= USS Ramsden =

1943 Edsall-class destroyer escort

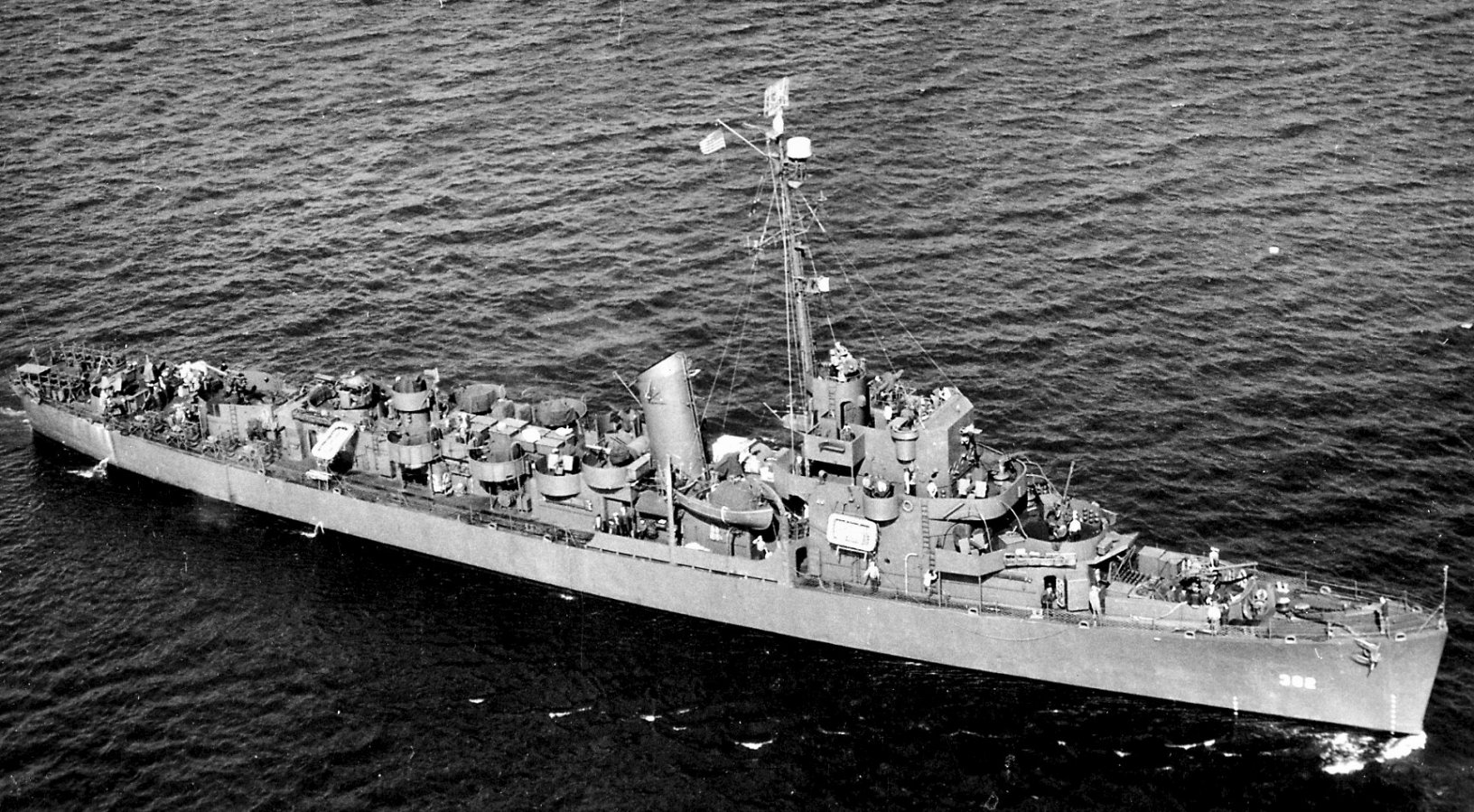

History

United States
- Name: USS Ramsden (DE-382)
- Namesake: Marvin Lee Ramsden
- Builder: Brown Shipbuilding, Houston, Texas
- Laid down: 26 March 1943
- Launched: 24 May 1943
- Commissioned: 19 October 1943
- Decommissioned: 23 June 1960
- Reclassified: DER-382, 1 November 1956
- Stricken: 1 August 1974
- Fate: Sunk as target

United States
- Name: USCGC Ramsden (WDE-382)
- Commissioned: 1 April 1952
- Decommissioned: 28 June 1954
- Fate: Returned to USN, 28 June 1954

General characteristics
- Class & type: Edsall-class destroyer escort
- Displacement: 1,253 tons standard; 1,590 tons full load
- Length: 306 feet (93.27 m)
- Beam: 36.58 feet (11.15 m)
- Draft: 10.42 full load feet (3.18 m)
- Propulsion: 4 FM diesel engines, 4 diesel-generators, 6,000 shp (4.5 MW), 2 screws
- Speed: 21 knots (39 km/h)
- Range: 9,100 nmi. at 12 knots; (17,000 km at 22 km/h)
- Complement: 8 officers, 201 enlisted
- Armament: 3 × single 3 in (76 mm)/50 guns; 1 × twin 40 mm AA guns; 8 × single 20 mm AA guns; 1 × triple 21 in (533 mm) torpedo tubes; 8 × depth charge projectors; 1 × depth charge projector (hedgehog); 2 × depth charge tracks

USS Ramsden (DE-382) was an Edsall-class destroyer escort built for the U.S. Navy during World War II. She served in the Atlantic Ocean and the Pacific Ocean and provided destroyer escort protection against submarine and air attack for Navy vessels and convoys. Post-war, she performed other tasks with the U.S. Coast Guard and with the U.S. Navy as a radar picket ship.

== Namesake ==
Marvin Lee Ramsden was born on 2 January 1919 at Pleasant Lake, North Dakota. He enlisted in the Navy on 21 May 1936 and reported for duty on USS Lexington on 8 October 1936. During the Battle of the Coral Sea on 8 May 1942, Coxswain Ramsden, a member of Lexington's crew throughout his career, remained at his exposed station, despite wounds, continuing to operate a rangefinder in the face of intense Japanese strafing and dive-bombing attacks until he died. He was posthumously awarded the Silver Star.

== Construction and commissioning ==
She was laid down 26 March 1943 by the Brown Shipbuilding Corp., Houston, Texas; launched 24 May 1943; sponsored by Mrs. James L. Ramsden, mother of Coxswain Ramsden; and commissioned 19 October 1943.

== World War II North Atlantic operations ==
Following shakedown off Bermuda, Ramsden, manned by a Coast Guard crew and assigned to CortDiv 23, steamed to New York, whence she sailed, 19 December, with her first convoy, NY-47 to the Panama Canal Zone. Returning to New York 9 January 1944, she commenced transatlantic runs on the 11th with UGS-30 to Casablanca. Returning 23 February, she departed New York for Bizerte with UGS-36, 10 March. Steaming first to Norfolk, Virginia, where 62 more ships joined the 36 vessels from New York, the convoy headed across the Atlantic and into the Mediterranean. Before dawn on 1 April, Nazi bombers and torpedo planes led in by flare-dropping scouts attacked the Allied ships.

== Attacked by Luftwaffe Aircraft ==
In 15 minutes, 0405 to 0420, the Luftwaffe damaged one merchantman and lost five aircraft, one to Ramsden's guns. Two days later the convoy reached Tunisia and on the 11th got underway for New York, arriving 2 May.

Availability and exercises at Casco Bay preceded another convoy run to Bizerte where men and supplies were being readied to push further into Axis-controlled Europe. Completing that run at Boston, Massachusetts, 11 July, Ramsden shifted to the North Atlantic convoy lanes and, during the remainder of the war in Europe, escorted seven convoys to the United Kingdom and France.

== Transferred to the Pacific Fleet ==
With the collapse of Germany, Ramsden was transferred, with her division, to the Pacific. Transiting the Panama Canal 18 June 1945, she called at San Francisco, California, then continued on to Adak, arriving 8 July. On the 15th, she shifted to Attu, whence she operated on plane guard duty for the remainder of World War II.

== End-of-War Activity ==
After Japan capitulated, the ship resumed escort duties, initially in the Aleutians, then, at the end of August, to Japan. On 9 September she brought auxiliary ships into Ominato Ko, Honshū; and, on the 20th, headed back to the U.S. carrying returning veterans. Navy Day celebrations at Ketchikan interrupted her postwar duties, but in November she got underway, with replacement troops and equipment embarked for Okinawa. She arrived at Buckner Bay 25 November, joined the U.S. 7th Fleet, and on 11 December sailed for Qingdao. Mail runs next took her to Manila and Shanghai whence she returned to Qingdao on 5 January 1946. She remained there supporting occupation troops until 11 February when she sailed for the eastern coast of the United States. Arriving at Charleston, South Carolina, 22 March, Ramsden steamed to Jacksonville, Florida, 24 April, then shifted to Green Cove Springs, Florida, where she decommissioned 13 June 1946 and entered the Atlantic Reserve Fleet.

== On Loan to the U.S. Coast Guard ==
Ordered activated after the outbreak of war in Korea, Ramsden was transferred to the U.S. Coast Guard and recommissioned 28 March 1952 with the Coast Guard hull designation WDE-382. Reporting for duty 1 April, Ramsden operated briefly on the west coast, then headed west to Honolulu, whence she operated on air-sea rescue patrol duty. On that duty for the next 2 years, she guarded the increased Pacific air traffic along routes between Hawaii and the mainland, Midway Island, Japan, and the Aleutians, and in the Aleutian and the Hawaiian Islands. Following the cessation of hostilities in Korea, and the subsequent decrease in air traffic, Ramsden returned to California, decommissioned at San Diego, California, on 10 April 1954 and reentered the Navy's Reserve Fleet 28 June 1954.

== Converted to Radar Picket Ship Duty ==
Ordered activated and converted to an escort radar picket ship in 1956, the escort arrived at Long Beach, California, 19 October for conversion and on 1 November was redesignated DER-382. Recommissioned 10 December 1957, she underwent shakedown and training off the west coast and in March 1958 returned to the Hawaiian Islands, where she was once again homeported. Based at Pearl Harbor, she operated on barrier patrol duty stations from Midway Island to the Aleutians until the spring of 1960 when she returned to the west coast for inactivation.

== Final Decommissioning ==
Decommissioning 23 June 1960, she again entered the Pacific Reserve Fleet and was struck from the Navy List on 1 August 1974. She was later used as a target and sunk; however, date of the sinking is not indicated in Navy records.

== Awards ==
Ramsden earned one battle star during World War II.
