= USS Daniel =

United States Navy WWII-era destroyer escort

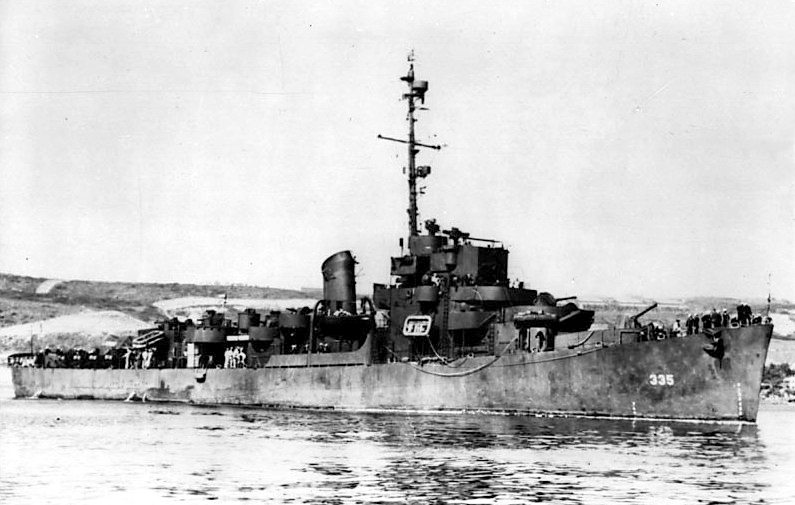

History

United States
- Namesake: Hugh Spencer Daniel
- Builder: Consolidated Steel Corporation, Orange, Texas
- Laid down: 30 August 1943
- Launched: 16 November 1943
- Commissioned: 24 January 1944
- Decommissioned: 12 April 1946
- Stricken: 15 January 1971
- Fate: Sold for scrapping, 30 January 1974

General characteristics
- Class & type: Edsall-class destroyer escort
- Displacement: 1,253 tons standard; 1,590 tons full load
- Length: 306 feet (93.27 m)
- Beam: 36.58 feet (11.15 m)
- Draft: 10.42 full load feet (3.18 m)
- Propulsion: 4 FM diesel engines, 4 diesel-generators, 6,000 shp (4.5 MW), 2 screws
- Speed: 21 knots (39 km/h)
- Range: 9,100 nmi. at 12 knots; (17,000 km at 22 km/h)
- Complement: 8 officers, 201 enlisted
- Armament: 3 × single 3 in (76 mm)/50 guns; 1 × twin 40 mm AA guns; 8 × single 20 mm AA guns; 1 × triple 21 in (533 mm) torpedo tubes; 8 × depth charge projectors; 1 × depth charge projector (hedgehog); 2 × depth charge tracks

USS Daniel (DE-335) was an Edsall-class destroyer escort in service with the United States Navy from 1944 to 1946. She was scrapped in 1974.

== Namesake ==
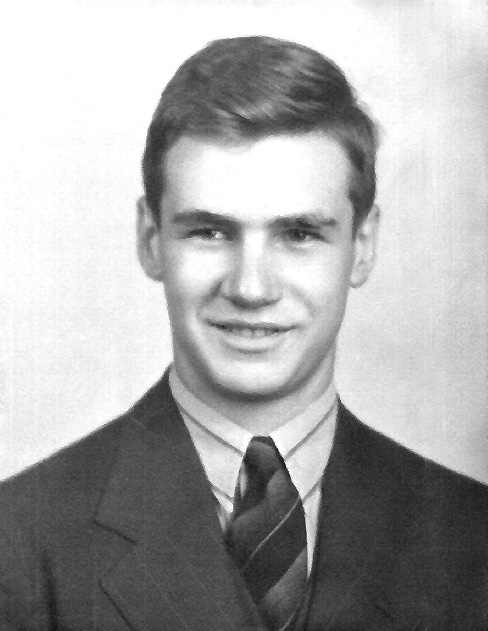
Hugh Spencer Daniel

Hugh Spencer Daniel was born on 26 December 1923 in Chattanooga, Tennessee. He enlisted in the Marine Corps Reserve 9 June 1941. Joining USS Hornet on 19 October 1941, he remained on board that ship until his death in the Battle of the Santa Cruz Islands on 26 October 1942. He was posthumously awarded the Navy Cross for his heroism in refusing to leave his gunnery station although wounded during this battle.

== Construction and commissioning ==
Daniel was launched 16 November 1943 by Consolidated Steel Corp., Orange, Texas; sponsored by Mrs. C. E. Daniel; and commissioned 24 January 1944.

=== Atlantic Ocean Convoy Duty ===
Sailing from Galveston, Texas, 11 February 1944, Daniel conducted shakedown training at Bermuda en route to Norfolk, Virginia, where she arrived 24 March. She was assigned to duty as school ship training destroyer escort nucleus crews in Hampton Roads, Virginia, until 31 May. After escorting a tug to Bermuda she reported for convoy duty.

Between 27 June and 27 September 1944 Daniel escorted two convoys to Naples, Italy, then made five escort voyages to ports in England and France between 23 October 1944 and 3 June 1945.

=== Pacific Theatre operations ===
Daniel arrived at San Diego, California, 29 July, and 4 days later got underway for Pearl Harbor. Arriving 9 August, she conducted exercises and served as plane guard for USS Corregidor (CVE-58) during pilot qualification landings.

=== Decommissioning and fate ===
On 5 September she sailed for the east coast, arriving at Philadelphia 27 September. She was placed out of commission in reserve at Green Cove Springs, Florida, 12 April 1946.
