= USS Paul Jones =

USS Paul Jones may refer to the following ships of the United States Navy, named after John Paul Jones:

- USS Paul Jones (1862), a sidewheel steamer, commissioned 1862, decommissioned in 1867.
- USS Paul Jones (DD-10), a Bainbridge-class destroyer, commissioned in 1902, decommissioned in 1919.
- USS Paul Jones (DD-230), a Clemson-class destroyer, commissioned in 1921, decommissioned in 1945.

== See also ==
- USS John Paul Jones, two later United States Navy ships named for John Paul Jones.
