= USS Lansing =

Destroyer of the United States Navy

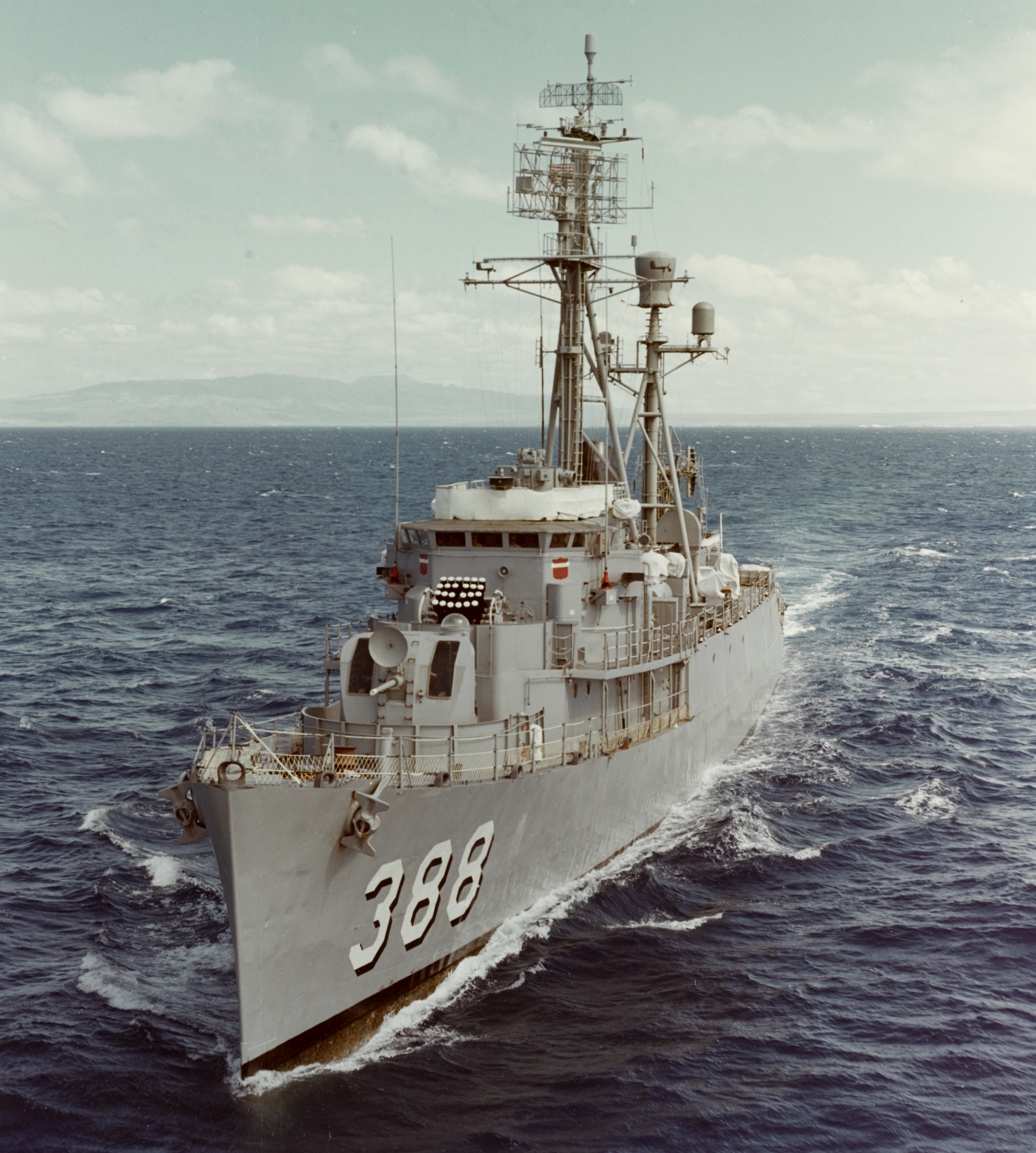

History

United States
- Namesake: William Henry Lansing
- Builder: Brown Shipbuilding, Houston, Texas
- Laid down: 15 May 1943
- Launched: 2 August 1943
- Commissioned: 10 November 1943
- Decommissioned: 21 May 1965
- Stricken: 1 February 1974
- Fate: Sold for scrapping, 16 August 1974

General characteristics
- Class & type: Edsall-class destroyer escort
- Displacement: 1,253 tons standard; 1,590 tons full load
- Length: 306 feet (93.27 m)
- Beam: 36.58 feet (11.15 m)
- Draft: 10.42 full load feet (3.18 m)
- Propulsion: 4 FM diesel engines, 4 diesel-generators, 6,000 shp (4.5 MW), 2 screws
- Speed: 21 knots (39 km/h)
- Range: 9,100 nmi. at 12 knots; (17,000 km at 22 km/h)
- Complement: 8 officers, 201 enlisted
- Armament: 3 × single 3 in (76 mm)/50 guns; 1 × twin 40 mm AA guns; 8 × single 20 mm AA guns; 1 × triple 21 in (533 mm) torpedo tubes; 8 × depth charge projectors; 1 × depth charge projector (hedgehog); 2 × depth charge tracks

USS Lansing (DE-388), an Edsall-class destroyer escort, was the only ship of the United States Navy to be named for Aviation Machinist Mate First Class William Henry Lansing.

== Namesake ==
William Henry Lansing was born on 7 March 1914 in Amsterdam, New York. He enlisted in the United States Naval Reserve on 14 February 1933. He joined the regular United States Navy on 8 May 1934 and was assigned to USS Lexington in August. In December 1941, Aviation Machinist Mate First Class Lansing joined Patrol Squadron 43, serving at San Diego, California and Alameda, California. Following the entry of the United States into World War II, his squadron was dispatched to the Aleutian Islands for the aviation buildup in the North Pacific. On 11 June 1942 as plane captain, he participated in a divebombing and strafing attack on Japanese shipping in Kiska Harbor. While manning his exposed and unprotected station at the engine controls, he was killed by enemy fire.

== Construction and commissioning ==
Her keel was laid down on 15 May 1943 by Brown Shipbuilding of Houston, Texas. She was launched on 2 August 1943 sponsored by Mrs. Alberta L. Lansing, widow of AD1 Lansing, and commissioned on 10 November 1943.

== History ==
After shakedown, Lansing departed Norfolk, Virginia, on 13 February 1944 on her first transatlantic cruise escorting convoy UGS 33 bound to Casablanca, the first of eight voyages to north African ports protecting convoys loaded with vital war material. During Lansing's second cruise, a convoy ship G. S. Walden was damaged by a torpedo fired from a U-boat on 12 May.

Arriving Boston, Massachusetts, on 12 June 1945 from her final transatlantic mission, the destroyer escort prepared for service in the Pacific. She transited the Panama Canal 2 August and was en route to Pearl Harbor when she received news of the Japanese surrender. Lansing returned New York 26 September, and decommissioned at Green Cove Springs 25 April 1946, joining the Atlantic Reserve Fleet.

She was transferred to the Coast Guard in June 1952. Upon her return to the Navy in 1954 Lansing was converted to a radar picket escort ship and given the hull classification symbol DER-388 21 October 1955. She was recommissioned 18 December 1956.

Lansing joined the Pacific Barrier 2 June 1957 for operations out of Pearl Harbor as a radar picket. From 1957 until 1965 she made regular patrols, ready to provide early warning in the event of an enemy attack. Lansing participated in the atomic tests at Johnston Island in the summer of 1958 and again in the fall of 1962. She sailed on Far East cruises during 1961 and 1963 and engaged in search operations for a downed Air Force Globemaster in January 1964.

== Fate ==
Arriving Bremerton, Washington, 22 February 1965, Lansing decommissioned there 21 May and entered the Pacific Reserve Fleet.

== Fiction ==
A fictional submarine USS Lansing (SSN-795), a Virginia-class submarine named for Lansing, Michigan, is the setting of the 2001 made-for-TV movie Danger Beneath the Sea. SSN-975, Lansing a Virginia class submarine, appears in the direct to video film Solar Attack.
