= USS Durant =

1943 Edsall-class destroyer escort

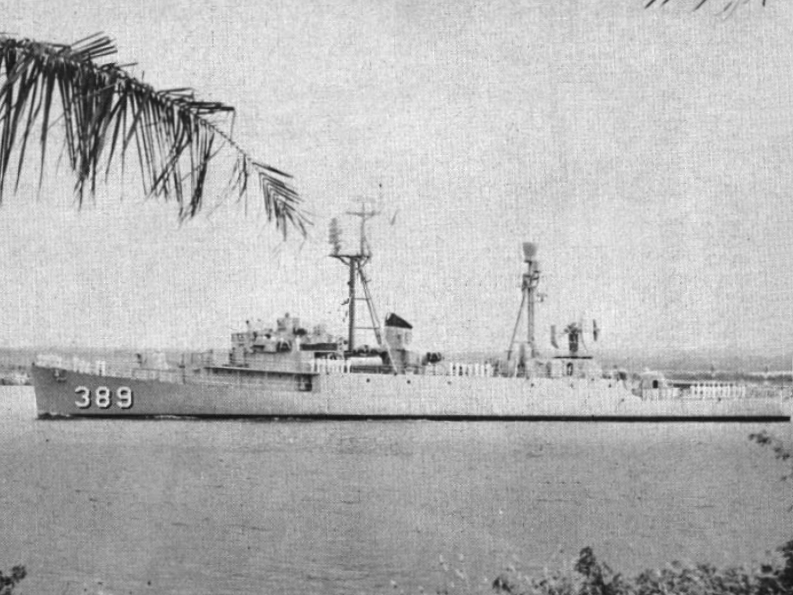
- USS Durant (DER-389) at Pearl Harbor c. 1963

History

United States
- Name: Durant
- Namesake: Kenneth W. Durant
- Builder: Brown Shipbuilding, Houston, Texas
- Laid down: 15 May 1943
- Launched: 3 August 1943
- Commissioned: 16 November 1943
- Decommissioned: June 1964
- Fate: Sold for scrap, 1 September 1974

General characteristics
- Class & type: Edsall-class destroyer escort
- Displacement: 1,253 tons standard; 1,590 tons full load
- Length: 306 feet (93.27 m)
- Beam: 36.58 feet (11.15 m)
- Draft: 10.42 full load feet (3.18 m)
- Propulsion: 4 FM diesel engines, 4 diesel-generators, 6,000 shp (4.5 MW), 2 screws
- Speed: 21 knots (39 km/h)
- Range: 9,100 nmi. at 12 knots; (17,000 km at 22 km/h)
- Complement: 8 officers, 201 enlisted
- Armament: 3 × single 3 in (76 mm)/50 guns; 1 × twin 40 mm AA guns; 8 × single 20 mm AA guns; 1 × triple 21 in (533 mm) torpedo tubes; 8 × depth charge projectors; 1 × depth charge projector (hedgehog); 2 × depth charge tracks

USS Durant (DE-389/WDE-489/DER-389) was an Edsall-class destroyer escort in the United States Navy, which served briefly in the United States Coast Guard.

== Namesake ==
Kenneth W. Durant was born on 2 March 1919 in Algona, Iowa. he enlisted in the Navy on 19 June 1940. He was killed in action on Guadalcanal on 3 November 1942 serving with the United States Marines Corps. Pharmacist's Mate Third Class Durant was posthumously awarded the Silver Star Medal for caring for the wounded and courage in facing machinegun and sniper fire in an attempt to rescue a wounded man.

== Construction ==
Durant was launched 3 August 1943, by Brown Shipbuilding, Houston, Texas; sponsored by Mrs. S. R. Durant, mother of Pharmacist's Mate Durant; and commissioned 16 November 1943.

== Service history ==
From 21 January to 7 February 1944, Durant served as schoolship at Norfolk, Virginia, for the training of prospective crews for escort vessels. She made eight voyages as a convoy escort to north African ports between 10 February 1944 and 12 June 1945, guarding men and supplies essential to victory in the European theater of war. On her last crossing the German submarine U-873 surrendered to the escorts.

Durant sailed from Boston, Massachusetts, 9 July 1945, and conducted refresher training at Guantanamo Bay, Cuba, on her way to San Diego, California, where she arrived 7 August. Four days later she got underway for Pearl Harbor, but with the end of the war in the Pacific, her stay there was brief and she returned to the east coast, arriving at New York 26 September. On 22 October, she reported to Jacksonville, Florida, to undergo inactivation. Durant was placed out of commission in reserve 27 February 1946.

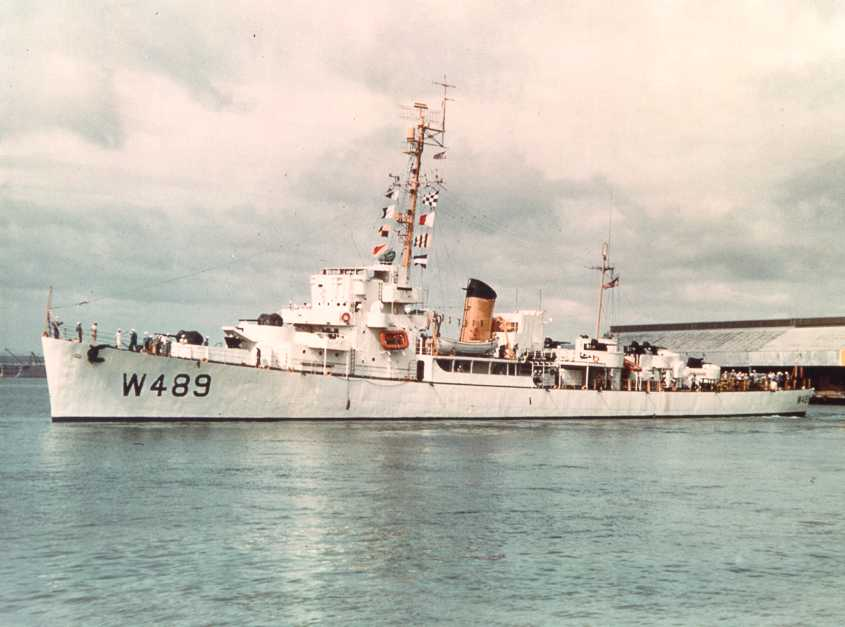
Durant as USCGC Durant (WDE-489).

Loaned to the Coast Guard 15 May 1952 Durant was commissioned as WDE-489, 9 May 1952, and served on various Pacific weather stations until placed out of commission in reserve at San Diego, 10 April 1954. She was returned to the Navy 16 June 1954, and reclassified DER-389, 7 December 1955. After conversion to a radar picket escort Durant was recommissioned 8 December 1956 and reported to San Diego for shakedown training. Sailing from San Francisco, California, 27 May 1957, she arrived at Pearl Harbor 2 June, to begin picket duty on the Pacific barrier line. Through 1962, she alternated periods of service on early warning duty with participation in exercises, air-sea rescue operations, and necessary maintenance periods. Durant was decommissioned in June 1964, and sold for scrapping on 1 September 1974.
