= USS Holder (DE-401) =

1943 Edsall-class destroyer escort

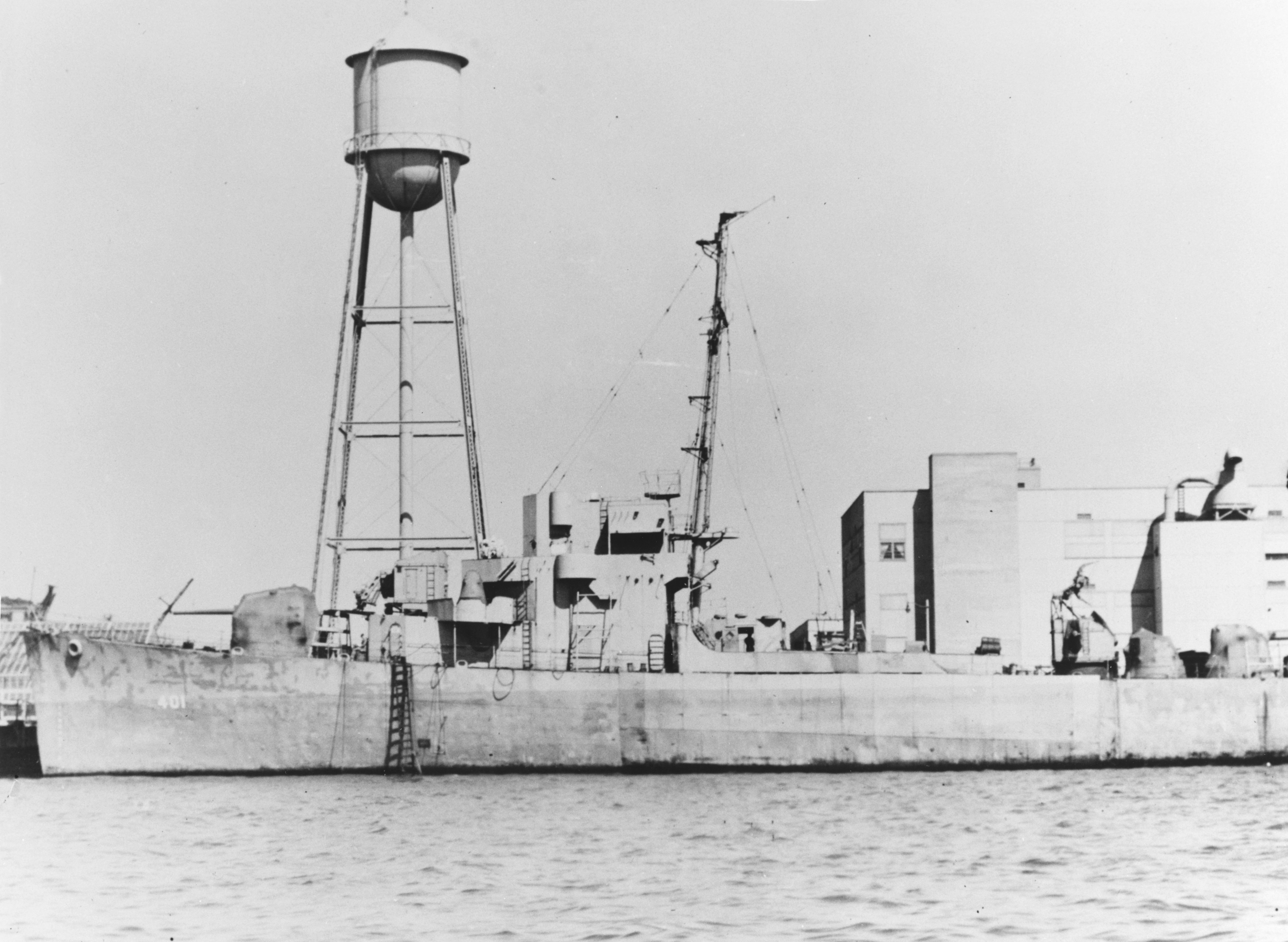
- An image of USS Holder (DE-401) being stripped as a parts hulk

History

United States
- Builder: Brown Shipbuilding, Houston, Texas
- Laid down: 6 October 1943
- Launched: 27 November 1943
- Commissioned: 18 January 1944
- Stricken: 23 September 1944
- Fate: Irreparably damaged by German aircraft on 11 April 1944, scrapped 1947

General characteristics
- Class & type: Edsall-class destroyer escort
- Displacement: 1,253 tons standard; 1,590 tons full load
- Length: 306 ft (93.3 m)
- Beam: 36.58 ft (11.1 m)
- Draft: 10.42 ft (3.2 m) full load
- Propulsion: 4 FM diesel engines, 4 diesel-generators, 6,000 shp (4,500 kW); 2 screws
- Speed: 21 knots (39 km/h; 24 mph)
- Range: 9,100 nmi (16,900 km; 10,500 mi) at 12 knots (22 km/h; 14 mph)
- Complement: 8 officers, 201 enlisted
- Armament: 3 × single 3 in (76 mm)/50 guns; 1 × twin 40 mm AA guns; 8 × single 20 mm AA guns; 1 × triple 21 in (533 mm) torpedo tubes; 8 × depth charge projectors; 1 × depth charge projector (hedgehog); 2 × depth charge tracks

USS Holder (DE-401) was an Edsall-class destroyer escort built for the United States Navy during World War II. Named for Lieutenant (junior grade) Randolph Mitchell Holder (a naval aviator who was reported missing during the Battle of Midway), she was the first of two U.S. Naval vessels to bear the name.

== History ==
Holder was launched by Brown Shipbuilding of Houston, Texas, on 27 November 1943, sponsored by Annette Holder, mother of Lieutenant (junior grade) Holder,; and commissioned 18 January 1944. After completion of her shakedown cruise, Holder departed 24 March escorting a convoy bound for Mediterranean ports. Proceeding along the coast of Algeria, the convoy was followed 10 and 11 April by German planes, and just before midnight on 11 April, she was attacked by torpedo bombers. Holder and the other escorts immediately opened fire and began making smoke, but a torpedo struck the escort vessel amidships on the port side, causing two heavy explosions. Though fires spread and flooding was serious, Holder's crew remained at their guns to drive off the attackers without damage to the convoy. Alert damage control kept the ship seaworthy, and she arrived in tow at Oran for repairs. There, the Navy decided to tow her to New York, where she arrived safely 9 June 1944.

Holder decommissioned at New York Navy Yard 13 September 1944, and was struck from the Naval Vessel Register 23 September 1944. A 95-foot-long section of the stern portion of Holder's hull was used to repair USS Menges; the remainder was sold for scrap to John A. Witte, Staten Island, New York, on 19 June 1947.

The bell of the ship is on display inside the museum ship USS Slater.

== Honors ==
Holder received one battle star for World War II service.

== See also ==
- List of U.S. Navy losses in World War II
