= USS John Paul Jones =

USS John Paul Jones refers to two destroyers of the United States Navy, named after John Paul Jones:

- USS John Paul Jones (DD-932), a Forrest Sherman-class destroyer, commissioned in 1956, redesignated as DDG-32 in 1967, and decommissioned in 1982
- USS John Paul Jones (DDG-53), an Arleigh Burke-class guided missile destroyer, commissioned in 1993, and in active service as of 2024

== See also ==
- USS Paul Jones, three earlier United States Navy warships named after John Paul Jones.
