= USS Savage =

1943 Edsall-class destroyer escort

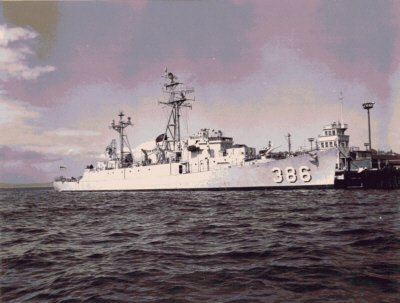
- USS Savage (DER-386)

History

United States
- Name: USS Savage
- Namesake: Walter Samuel Savage Jr.
- Builder: Brown Shipbuilding, Houston, Texas
- Laid down: 30 April 1943
- Launched: 15 July 1943
- Commissioned: 29 October 1943
- Decommissioned: 17 October 1969
- Reclassified: DER-386, 28 October 1954
- Stricken: 1 June 1975
- Fate: Sunk as target off California on 25 October 1982

General characteristics
- Class & type: Edsall-class destroyer escort
- Displacement: 1,253 tons standard; 1,590 tons full load
- Length: 306 ft (93 m)
- Beam: 36.5 ft (11.1 m)
- Draft: 10.42 ft (3.18 m) full load
- Propulsion: 4 FM diesel engines, 4 diesel-generators, 6,000 shp (4,500 kW), 2 screws
- Speed: 21 kn (39 km/h; 24 mph)
- Range: 9,100 nmi (16,900 km; 10,500 mi) at 12 kn (22 km/h; 14 mph)
- Complement: 8 officers, 201 enlisted
- Armament: 3 × single 3 in (76 mm)/50 guns; 1 × twin 40 mm AA guns; 8 × single 20 mm AA guns; 1 × triple 21 in (533 mm) torpedo tubes; 8 × depth charge projectors; 1 × depth charge projector (hedgehog); 2 × depth charge tracks

USS Savage (DE-386) was an Edsall-class destroyer escort built for the United States Navy during World War II.

== Namesake ==
Walter Samuel Savage Jr. was born on 26 April 1919 in New Orleans, Louisiana. He was commissioned Ensign, United States Naval Reserve, on 10 June 1941. After instruction at the Navy Supply Corps School, Harvard University, Ensign Savage reported to the USS Arizona for duty as Assistant Paymaster. He died on the Arizona during the Japanese attack on Pearl Harbor on 7 December 1941.

== Construction and commissioning ==
She was laid down 30 April 1943 by Brown Shipbuilding Co., Houston, Texas and launched on 15 July 1943. The ship was commissioned on 29 October 1943 manned by a Coast Guard crew. On 18 November 1943, she was underway for Bermuda, British West Indies, for her shakedown cruise.

Commencing Thanksgiving Day of 1943, the ship was subjected to a rigorous training schedule including gunnery practice, submarine warfare tactics, maneuvering, and the hundreds of other tasks demanded of a man-o-war.

On 23 December 1943 she departed for the U.S. Navy Yard in Charleston, South Carolina for post-shakedown repairs.

== World War II North Atlantic operations ==
On Christmas Day, Savage completed her training and ship and crew reported to Norfolk, Virginia as members of the Atlantic Fleet.

In January 1944 the ship was assigned as one of six vessels composing Escort Division 23 of Task Force 63. This task force was engaged in escorting convoys of 60 to 80 merchant ships from United States ports to the Mediterranean Theatre.

During the operations, lasting approximately seven weeks for each convoy, Savage and her sister ships safely escorted hundreds of ships loaded with vital war materials safely past the heavy enemy submarine and air concentrations in the Atlantic and Mediterranean.

On 1 April 1944, Convoy UGS 36, whose escort included USS Savage, was attacked by thirty enemy aircraft north of Algiers, Algeria. So intense was the gunfire of the escorting ships that the attack was repelled without a single allied vessel lost. Her only casualty during the action was a member of the depth charge crew who was struck in the ankle by shell fragments.

During the latter half of 1944 and the first six months of 1945, USS Savage escorted high-speed troop convoys between New York and the British Isles to support the final assault on Nazi Germany.

During eighteen crossings of the Atlantic, Savage and her sister ships safely brought through over 1,000 loaded troop and supply ships without a single loss despite the persistent threat of enemy vessels and treacherous weather conditions.

Following the defeat of Nazi Germany, Savage sailed to the Brooklyn Navy Yard, where she was fitted with more anti-aircraft guns. She then sailed on 30 May 1945 for an intensive period of operational and gunnery training in the Caribbean off Culebra, Puerto Rico.

== Transferred to the Pacific theater ==
After transiting the Panama Canal on 18 June 1945, she proceeded from San Francisco to the Aleutian Islands and arrived at Adak on 8 July 1945. The ship and her crew reported to the Commander of North Pacific Fleets for escort duty.

== End-of-war activity ==
After the hostilities in the Pacific ended, Savage escorted two convoys from Cold Bay, Alaska to Russian waters where the American escort ships were dismissed. One convoy departed Cold Harbor on 23 July 1945 and the other on 25 August 1945. During the interim, she escorted oilers to refuel Task Force 92, which had been bombarding shore installations in the Kuril Islands of Russia; then occupied by Japanese forces.

On 27 September 1945 Savage departed Attu for Petropavlovsk, USSR, and arrived there on the morning of 2 October 1945. She delivered supplies and mail to USS Harry L. Corl then departed for Attu.

At the end of hostilities with Japan, Savage was assigned liaison duty in the Far East. She shuttled between Okinawa, and Qingdao, China from December 1945 until February 1946 when she sailed for Pearl Harbor.

In April 1946, she sailed for Green Cove Springs, Florida. She was decommissioned there on 13 June 1946; with her CO Captain John M. Waters, USCG in attendance. Also decommissioned at this location in June 1946 were the other five Coast Guard manned ships comprising CortDiv23. Sellstrom, Ramsden, Mills, and Richey. With the exception of Richey, all were recommissioned as Navy manned destroyer escort radar picket ships.

== Conversion to radar picket ship ==
After World War II most, if not all, early warning networks had been dismantled. At the height of the Cold War, paranoia ran deep within the halls of the United States military establishment. By 1949, the USSR had developed the atomic bomb and the capacity to deliver it by air. The United States considered that it needed to protect itself from the Soviets, formerly allies. To this end, the US constructed early-warning stations. This system was called the Distant Early Warning system or the DEW Line, which was a state of the art product.

There were 22 stations and the line spanned approximately 3,693 miles (5,943 km). The DEW Line's radar stations could chart the path of the Soviet bombers toward the North American continent. It was hailed as "a bulwark" against the forces of communism. Radar picket escort destroyers were employed to detect these aircraft moving toward North America on a polar route.

Savage was redesignated a radar picket escort destroyer (DER-386) on 3 September 1954 and recommissioned on 18 February 1955 in Boston, Massachusetts; with Lt. Cmdr. R. E. Davis, USN as commanding officer. Distinguished guests included Walter S. Savage Sr., father of Walter S. Savage Jr., USNR, and Captain Oscar C. Rohnke, USCG.

In July 1955, she was transferred to the Pacific Fleet with her home port being Seattle, Washington. She arrived in Seattle on 6 August 1955. Savage served in this capacity until December 1958, when her home port was changed to Pearl Harbor. She operated as a radar picket ship of the mid-Pacific barrier from 12 January 1959 until March 1960.

She then served as a search and rescue navigation aid ship until May 1965.

== Vietnam operations ==
On 17 May 1965, Savage sailed for South Vietnam where she spent more time on station in Operation Market Time than any other DER. She guarded against sea infiltration by North Vietnamese and assisted land forces by providing naval gunfire support. She had no periods out of Vietnam service until October when she made a five-day visit to Hong Kong.

From October 1965 through October 1968 the ship made five more tours off Vietnam on Operation Market Time, operating 50–100 yards (46–91 m) offshore, searching junks and small fishing boats for Viet Cong weapons and infrequently providing naval gunfire support with her two 3-inch (76 mm) guns from 1 to 15 January, 12 June to 16 September 1966, 24 August to 8 September 1967, 16 September to 12 October and 2 to 18 December 1968. She made Taiwan Strait patrols in June, September, and December 1967; and in July and October 1968.

During her 1967 and 1968 Market Time patrols, she also served as "mother ship" to 5 – 6 U.S. Navy PCF's (swift boats). All of Savage's officers (except for the Executive Officer and Commanding Officer) functioned as additional officers to the two crews per Swift Boat (daytime and nighttime) covering the Mekong River Delta and the Mekong River in the "brown water navy".

On 1 February 1969 she arrived back in Pearl Harbor and entered the naval shipyard for restricted availability and upkeep. On 7 July 1969 she departed for San Francisco and deactivation at Mare Island Naval Shipyard in Vallejo, California. On 17 October 1969, she was decommissioned for the last time and joined the inactive reserve fleet.

== Post-war decommissioning ==
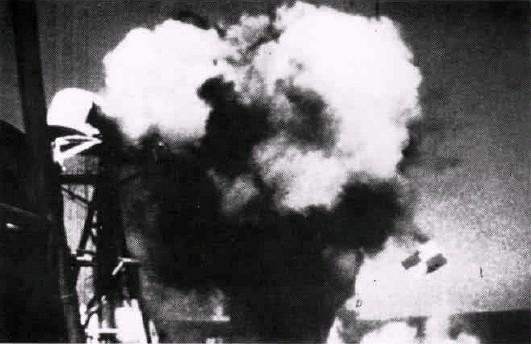
Explosion of an AGM-88A HARM missile on Savage in 1982

She was stricken on 1 June 1975 and sunk as a target off California on 25 October 1982.

== Awards ==
USS Savage earned one battle star in World War II (Convoy UGS 36, 1 April 1944).

- American Campaign Medal
- European-African-Middle Eastern Campaign Medal with one battle star
- Asiatic-Pacific Campaign Medal
- World War II Victory Medal
- Navy Occupation Service Medal with "ASIA" clasp
- China Service Medal
- National Defense Service Medal
- Vietnam Service Medal with six campaign stars
- Republic of Vietnam Campaign Medal
