= USS Hissem =

1943 Edsall-class destroyer escort

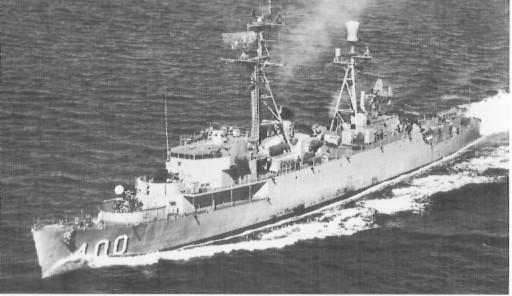
- USS Hissem (DER-400) as a radar picket ship

History

United States
- Namesake: Joseph Hissem
- Builder: Brown Shipbuilding, Houston, Texas
- Launched: 26 December 1943
- Commissioned: 13 January 1944
- Decommissioned: 15 May 1970
- Stricken: 1 June 1975
- Fate: Sunk as a target off California on 24 February 1982

General characteristics
- Class & type: Edsall-class destroyer escort
- Displacement: 1,253 tons standard; 1,590 tons full load
- Length: 306 feet (93.27 m)
- Beam: 36.58 feet (11.15 m)
- Draft: 10.42 full load feet (3.18 m)
- Propulsion: 4 FM diesel engines, 4 diesel-generators, 6,000 shp (4.5 MW), 2 screws
- Speed: 21 knots (39 km/h)
- Range: 9,100 nmi. at 12 knots; (17,000 km at 22 km/h)
- Complement: 8 officers, 201 enlisted
- Armament: 3 × single 3 in (76 mm)/50 guns; 1 × twin 40 mm AA guns; 8 × single 20 mm AA guns; 1 × triple 21 in (533 mm) torpedo tubes; 8 × depth charge projectors; 1 × depth charge projector (hedgehog); 2 × depth charge tracks

USS Hissem (DE-400/DER-400) was an Edsall class destroyer escort of the United States Navy. Hissem was constructed in 1943 as DE-400. In 1955, the vessel was equipped with modern radars, and the designation was changed to DER-400. The special purpose of DER (Destroyer Escort Radar picket) ships was the detection of aircraft. Their chief role was to extend the DEW line out into the N. Atlantic and the N. Pacific oceans.

== Namesake ==
Joseph Metcalf Hissem was born on 31 December 1917 in Mount Carroll, Illinois. He enlisted in the United States Naval Reserve on 9 January 1941. Following flight training he was appointed Ensign on 30 August 1941. Though he was assigned to a patrol squadron in Hawaii, he volunteered for temporary duty with Torpedo Squadron 8. In the first attack in the Battle of Midway on 4 June 1942 Hissem and his squadron took off from USS Hornet and without fighter protection pressed home an attack on the Imperial Japanese Navy aircraft carriers until all were shot down. Although no ships were sunk in the attack, they diverted air cover and forced a re-arming of Japanese planes which brought victory for the U.S. fleet. He was posthumously awarded the Navy Cross and the Purple Heart.

== History ==
Hissem was launched by Brown Shipbuilding, Houston, Texas, 26 December 1943; sponsored by Miss Elizabeth D. Hissem, sister of Ensign Hissem; and commissioned 13 January 1944.

Following a shakedown cruise to Bermuda, Hissem steamed via Charleston, South Carolina to New York, where she arrived 20 March 1944. Her first combat duty was as an escort ship with convoy UGS-37, carrying vitally needed troops and supplies to the Mediterranean. The convoy departed Norfolk, Virginia 23 March and entered the Mediterranean Sea without attack. Then near Algiers the night of 11–12 April the Luftwaffe attacked. About 35 bombers and torpedo planes struck in a coordinated attack, and were repulsed by accurate gunnery and evasive chemical smoke. Hissem's gun crews splashed one torpedo plane and damaged another, as the escorts prevented damage to the huge convoy of transports. The only ship struck was escort ship USS Holder (DE-401), torpedoed but able to make port.

Subsequently, Hissem performed regular escort duty across the Atlantic interspersed with anti-submarine and anti-aircraft training on the East Coast of the United States. The ship transported over 500 paratroopers in March 1945, taking them on board in the Azores, transferring them to SS Althone Castle, and escorting the ship through submarine waters to Liverpool. Braving both the Germans and the heavy weather of the North Atlantic. Hissem made a total of seven convoy voyages from June 1944 until she returned to New York 28 May 1945.

With the war in Europe over, the destroyer escort prepared to join the Pacific Fleet in dealing the death blows to the Japanese Empire. She sailed 20 June from New York and after operations in the Caribbean arrived Pearl Harbor 26 July 1945. Hissem remained at Hawaii until after the surrender of Japan, and steamed 30 August for Eniwetok and Ulithi. The ship then continued to Japan, arriving Tokyo 7 October 1945 to assist occupation operations. Sailing to Guam 29 October, the ship transported occupation troops to nearby islands, acted as air-sea rescue ship, and steamed as a weather ship through the western Pacific.

Hissem sailed for the United States 9 January 1946. Arriving San Pedro 25 January, she got underway 2 days later for the Panama Canal and Philadelphia, Pennsylvania, where she arrived 11 February. After repairs the ship steamed to Green Cove Springs, Florida, 23 March and decommissioned 15 June 1946.

Hissem was brought out of reserve in 1955 and converted for use as a radar picket ship at Boston Navy Yard. Equipped with the latest electronic detection devices, she recommissioned at Boston 31 August 1956. After shakedown the ship joined the Atlantic Barrier, cruising as a sea extension of the DEW line to strengthen the northern defenses of Canada and the United States. In the years that followed, first out of Boston and later Newport, Hissem alternated 1 month of lonely picket duty with a month of in-port or training time, often experiencing the characteristic heavy weather of the North Atlantic. In 1959 and 1962 she made visits to Northern European and Mediterranean ports. Hissem was a member of the Cuban Missile Crisis blockade. Oct 1962

Hissem saw varied duty in 1963. After two tours of picket duty she acted as command ship during the search for lost submarine USS Thresher (SSN-593) 16–21 April. A month as school ship for sonar training at Key West, Florida was followed by two more days of duty on Thresher search operations 27–28 June. Taking up new duties, Hissem sailed 12 August for New Zealand and Operation Deepfreeze, the Navy's continuing effort at exploration and scientific work in Antarctica. The radar picket ship operated between the continent and New Zealand as a navigational beacon and rescue ship for flights to and from the Navy's air facility at McMurdo Sound.

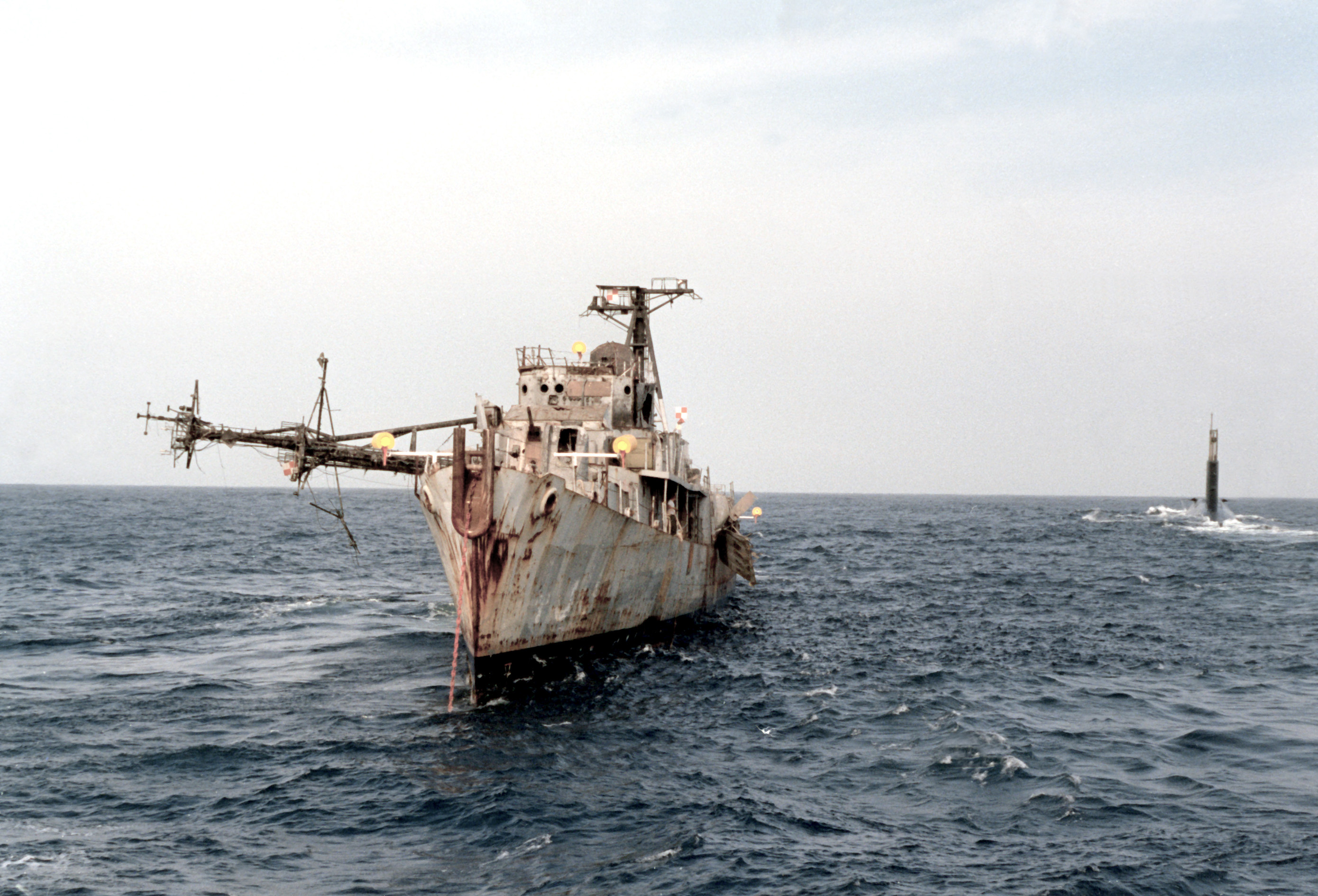
ex-Hissem as a target ship in 1981. The submarine HMS Courageous is visible on the right.

Hissem remained a member of Operation "Deep Freeze" from 19 September to 28 February 1964. She then returned to the Atlantic Fleet by way of the Mediterranean, arriving 15 May. Early in 1965 Hissem was transferred to the Pacific Fleet. After a 5-month training period at Pearl Harbor, she sailed for Vietnam 2 September. From January 1966 to March Hissem was a member of TF-115 operating in the Tonkin Gulf to prevent the infiltration of supplies to the Viet Cong. On 8 March Hissem sailed for Pearl Harbor, where she underwent repairs and training. Once again ordered to Vietnam, Hissem left Hawaii 2 September and arrived Subic Bay 23 September. She resumed her previous duties and operated off Southeast Asia into 1967.

== Fate ==
Hissem was decommissioned on 15 May 1970 and struck from the Naval Vessel Register on 1 June 1975. She was sunk as a target off California on 24 February 1982.

== Honors ==
American Campaign Medal

Europe, Middle East, and North Africa Campaign Medal,

Asia Pacific Campaign Medal,

WWII Victory Medal

WWII Navy Occupation Medal

National Defense Service Medal

Vietnam Campaign Medal

Vietnam Service Medal
