= USS Merrill (DE-392) =

American Naval Ship

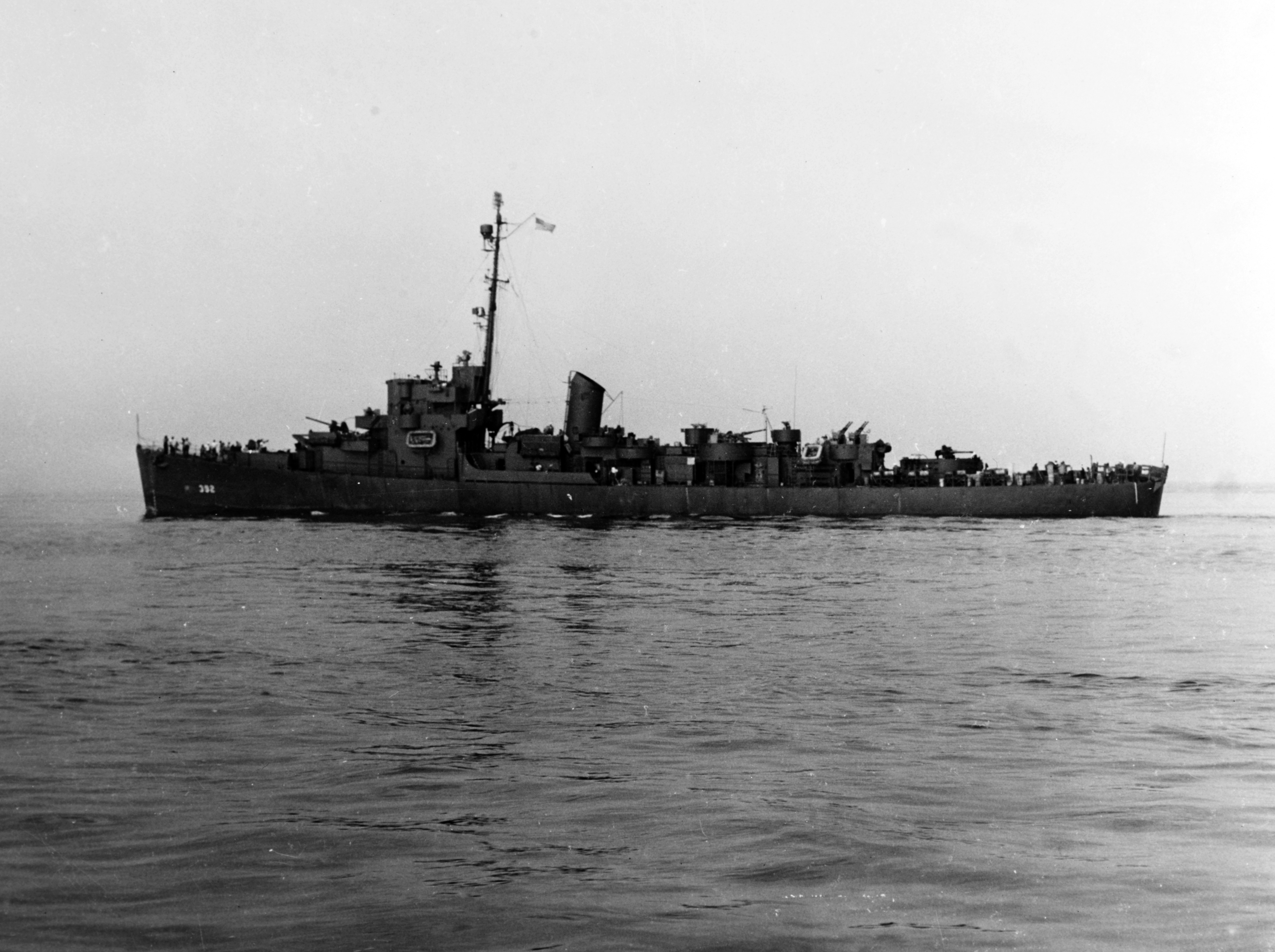

History

United States
- Namesake: Howard Deel Merrill
- Builder: Brown Shipbuilding, Houston, Texas
- Laid down: 1 July 1943
- Launched: 29 August 1943
- Commissioned: 27 November 1943
- Decommissioned: 1 May 1946
- Stricken: 2 April 1971
- Fate: Sold for scrapping 30 September 1974

General characteristics
- Class & type: Edsall-class destroyer escort
- Displacement: 1,253 tons standard; 1,590 tons full load
- Length: 306 feet (93.27 m)
- Beam: 36.58 feet (11.15 m)
- Draft: 10.42 full load feet (3.18 m)
- Propulsion: 4 FM diesel engines, 4 diesel-generators, 6,000 shp (4.5 MW), 2 screws
- Speed: 21 knots (39 km/h)
- Range: 9,100 nmi. at 12 knots; (17,000 km at 22 km/h)
- Complement: 8 officers, 201 enlisted
- Armament: 3 × single 3 in (76 mm)/50 guns; 1 × twin 40 mm AA guns; 8 × single 20 mm AA guns; 1 × triple 21 in (533 mm) torpedo tubes; 8 × depth charge projectors; 1 × depth charge projector (hedgehog); 2 × depth charge tracks

USS Merrill (DE-392) was an Edsall-class destroyer escort in service with the United States Navy from 1943 to 1946. She was sold for scrapping in 1974.

== Namesake ==
Howard Deel Merrill was born on 16 December 1917 at Provo, Utah. He was appointed midshipman at the United States Naval Academy on 25 June 1936. Commissioned Ensign on 6 June 1940, he reported for duty on the USS Arizona on 2 July. He was declared dead as of 7 December 1941, as a result of the Japanese attack on Pearl Harbor.

== Construction and commissioning ==
She was laid down 1 July 1943 by the Brown Shipbuilding Co., Houston, Texas; launched 29 August 1943; sponsored by Miss Dorothy E. Merrill, sister of Ens. H. D. Merrill; and commissioned 27 November 1943.

=== Battle of the Atlantic ===
Following Bermuda shakedown, Merrill reported to the Atlantic Fleet at Norfolk, Virginia, 28 January 1944. Assigned to CortDiv 45, she began transatlantic escort duty with a North Africa bound convoy 12 February. The destroyer escort continued this duty between American and Mediterranean ports until war ended, successfully escorting 15 convoys across the Atlantic.

=== Pacific War ===
On 6 July 1945, Merrill sailed for Guantánamo Bay for training, thence to Pearl Harbor. En route, she received news of the Japanese capitulation on 14 August.

=== Decommissioning and fate ===
On 3 September 1945 she sailed for New York, arrived on the 26th, then on 19 October got underway for Jacksonville, Florida, and deactivation. On 1 May 1946 she decommissioned and entered the Atlantic Reserve Fleet and berthed at Green Cove Springs, Florida. Into 1969 she was berthed at the Orange, Texas, branch of the Atlantic Reserve Fleet. On 2 April 1971 she was struck from the Navy list, and, on 30 September 1974, she was sold for scrapping.
