= USS Haas =

John C. Butler-class destroyer escort of the United States Navy

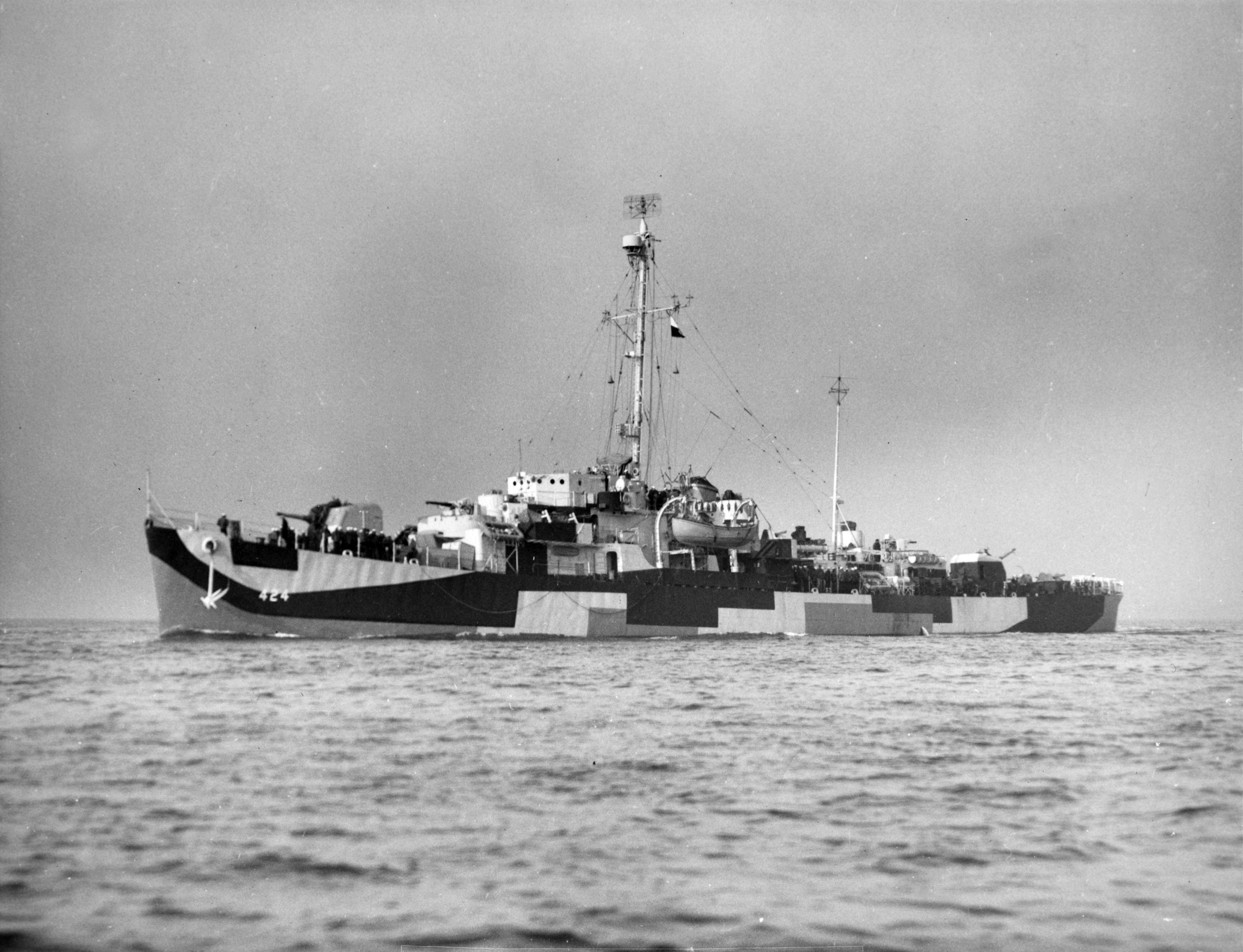
- Haas on 5 October 1944

History

United States
- Name: Haas
- Laid down: 23 February 1944
- Launched: 20 March 1944
- Commissioned: 2 August 1944
- Decommissioned: 31 May 1946
- In service: 8th Naval District, May 1951
- Out of service: 24 January 1958
- Stricken: 1 July 1966
- Fate: Sold for scrapping 6 September 1967

General characteristics
- Class & type: John C. Butler-class destroyer escort
- Displacement: 1,350 long tons (1,372 t)
- Length: 306 ft (93 m) overall
- Beam: 36 ft 10 in (11.23 m)
- Draft: 13 ft 4 in (4.06 m) maximum
- Propulsion: 2 boilers, 2 geared steam turbines, 12,000 shp (8,900 kW), 2 screws
- Speed: 24 knots (44 km/h; 28 mph)
- Range: 6,000 nmi (11,000 km; 6,900 mi) 12 knots (22 km/h; 14 mph)
- Complement: 14 officers, 201 enlisted
- Armament: 2-5 in (130 mm), 4 (2 × 2) 40 mm AA, 10-20 mm guns AA, 3-21 inch (533 mm) torpedo tubes, 1 Hedgehog, 8 depth charge projectors, 2 depth charge tracks

USS Haas (DE-424) was a John C. Butler-class destroyer escort acquired by the U.S. Navy during World War II. The primary purpose of the destroyer escort was to escort and protect ships in convoy, in addition to other tasks as assigned, such as patrol or radar picket.

== Namesake ==
John William Haas was born on 14 June 1907 in Sioux City, Iowa.

On 4 June 1942 during the Battle of Midway, chief machinist Haas was serving with Torpedo Squadron Three (VT-3) on the USS Yorktown when he was killed in action. He was posthumously awarded the Navy Cross. The citation reads:

The Navy Cross is presented to John William Haas (0-146612), Chief Machinist, U.S. Navy, for extraordinary heroism and distinguished service beyond the call of duty as a Pilot of Torpedo Squadron THREE (VT-3) embarked from the U.S.S. YORKTOWN (CV-5) during the "Air Battle of Midway", against enemy Japanese forces on 4 June 1942. Participating in a torpedo plane assault against Japanese naval units, Chief Machinist Haas, in the face of tremendous anti-aircraft fire and overwhelming fighter opposition, pressed home his attack to a point where it became relatively certain that, in order to accomplish his mission, he would probably sacrifice his life. Undeterred by the grave possibilities of such a hazardous offensive, he carried on, with extreme disregard for his own personal safety, until his squadron scored direct hits on two enemy aircraft carriers. His self sacrificing gallantry and fortitude were in keeping with the highest traditions of the United States Naval Service

== Construction and commissioning ==
Haas was launched on 20 March 1944 by the Brown Shipbuilding Co., Houston, Texas; sponsored by Mrs. Gladys Winifred Haas, widow of Chief Machinist Haas: and commissioned on 2 August 1944.

== World War II Pacific Theatre operations ==
After shakedown in the Caribbean and escort duty along the U.S. East Coast, Haas arrived Manus, Admiralty Islands, via the Panama Canal, the Galapagos Islands, and Espiritu Santo 15 January 1945. America's Pacific war effort had carried her fleet back to the Philippines, and Haas sailed to Leyte 27 January to assume escort and patrol duties in the still-contested islands. In addition, the destroyer escort provided shore bombardment and fire support for initial assault landings at Lubang Island 1 March and Romblon and Simara Islands 10 March – 12 March. Haas escorted a convoy from Okinawa to Leyte in July and another from Ulithi to Manila in early August, just before news of the Japanese capitulation.

== End-of-war assignments ==
After the war's end she continued to serve as an escort and dispatch ship in the Pacific Ocean, with frequent trips along the China coast. On 5 January 1946 Haas streamed her homeward bound pennant and sailed from Hong Kong for San Diego, California, via Guam, Eniwetok, and Pearl Harbor. Reaching her destination 1 February, Haas decommissioned there 31 May 1946 and joined the "mothball fleet."

== Recommissioned as a training ship ==
Haas recommissioned at San Diego 19 May 1951 and after shakedown reported to 8th Naval District headquarters at New Orleans, Louisiana, 18 September to begin duties as a reserve training ship. Cruising primarily in the Gulf of Mexico and the Caribbean, with occasional visits to Central and South America, Haas trained some 900 reservists annually as part of the Navy's never-ending effort to maintain skilled and ready reserve.

== Final decommissioning ==
Entering the Charleston Navy Yard 7 November 1957, Haas decommissioned there 24 January 1958 and entered the Atlantic Reserve Fleet where she remained until scrapped in December 1966. On 6 September 1967 she was sold for scrapping.
