= USS Stockdale (DE-399) =

1943 Edsall-class destroyer escort

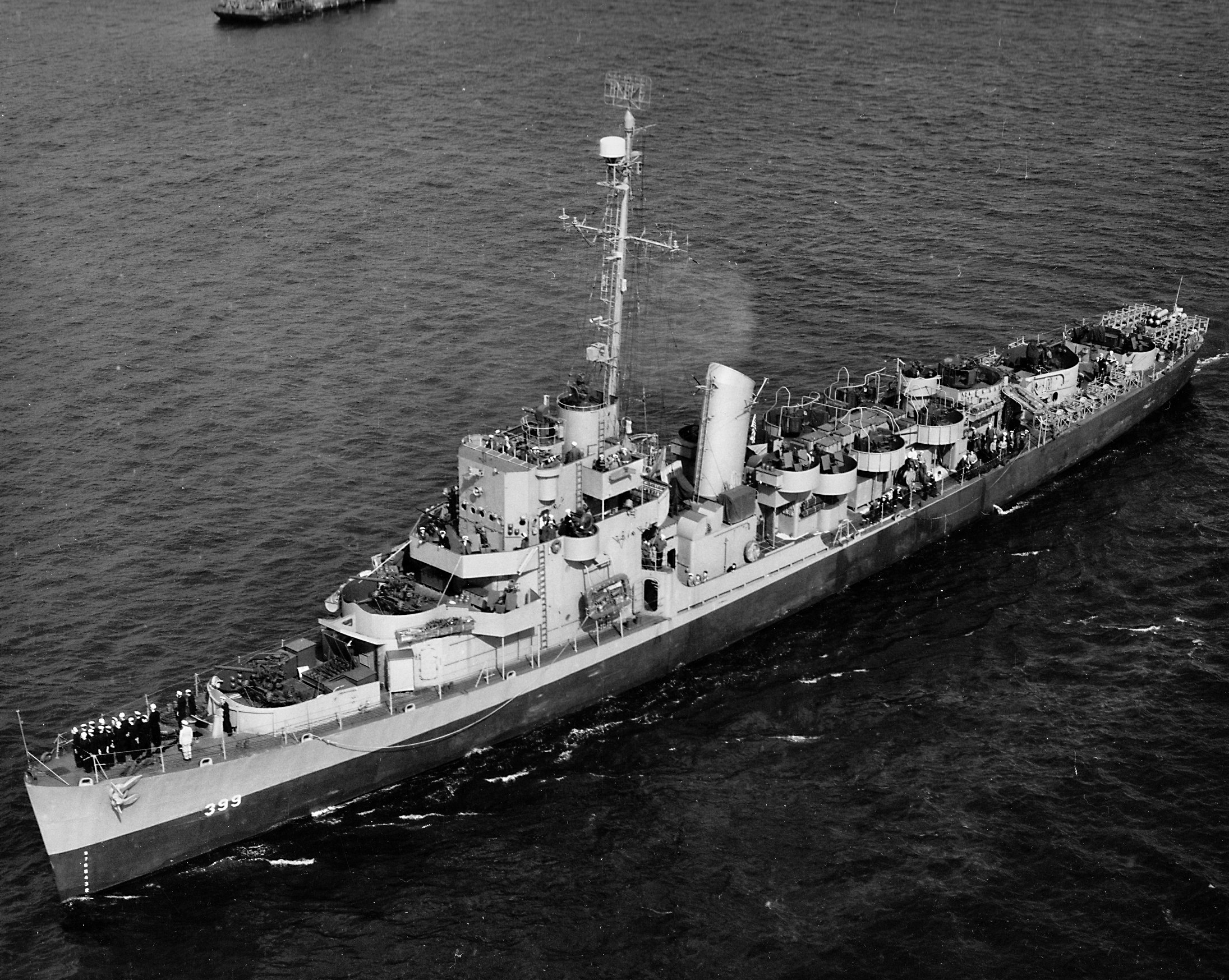

History

United States
- Namesake: Lewis Stevens Stockdale
- Builder: Brown Shipbuilding, Houston, Texas
- Laid down: 31 August 1943
- Launched: 30 October 1943
- Commissioned: 31 December 1943
- Decommissioned: 18 April 1947
- Stricken: 1 July 1972
- Fate: Sunk as target off Florida, 24 May 1974.

General characteristics
- Class & type: Edsall-class destroyer escort
- Displacement: 1,253 tons standard; 1,590 tons full load
- Length: 306 feet (93.27 m)
- Beam: 36.58 feet (11.15 m)
- Draft: 10.42 full load feet (3.18 m)
- Propulsion: 4 FM diesel engines, 4 diesel-generators, 6,000 shp (4.5 MW), 2 screws
- Speed: 21 knots (39 km/h)
- Range: 9,100 nmi. at 12 knots; (17,000 km at 22 km/h)
- Complement: 8 officers, 201 enlisted
- Armament: 3 × single 3 in (76 mm)/50 guns; 1 × twin 40 mm AA guns; 8 × single 20 mm AA guns; 1 × triple 21 in (533 mm) torpedo tubes; 8 × depth charge projectors; 1 × depth charge projector (hedgehog); 2 × depth charge tracks

USS Stockdale (DE–399) was an Edsall-class destroyer escort in service with the United States Navy from 1943 to 1947. She was sunk as a target in 1974.

== Namesake ==
Lewis Stevens Stockdale was born on 20 September 1914 at Anaconda, Montana. He enlisted in the United States Naval Reserve on 9 September 1940 as an apprentice seaman. After serving on the cruiser USS Quincy, he was appointed midshipman in the Naval Reserve on 17 March 1941 and was commissioned Ensign on 12 June 1941. He reported to the USS Oklahoma on 19 July 1941 and was killed while serving in that ship during the Japanese Attack on Pearl Harbor on 7 December 1941.

== History ==
USS Stockdale (DE-399) was laid down by Brown Shipbuilding, Houston, Texas on 31 August 1943; launched on 30 October 1943; sponsored by Mrs. L.C. Stockdale and commissioned on 31 December 1943.

=== Battle of the Atlantic ===
Stockdale held her shakedown cruise off Bermuda during February 1944 and underwent a short yard period at Charleston, South Carolina in March before proceeding to Norfolk, Virginia. The escort was assigned to escort Division 58. The division sailed from Norfolk on 24 March with convoy UGS 37 bound for North Africa. The convoy consisted of 60 merchant ships and six LST's. On 17 April, the convoy was attacked by the Luftwaffe as it neared Algeria. A mixed force of "Dorniers" and "Junkers" made bombing runs on the convoy and the escorts. No merchant ships of the convoy were damaged, but Holder was torpedoed and badly damaged. Stockdale escorted two more convoys to the Mediterranean and returned with GUS 51 in early October.

On 22 October 1944, Stockdale began escorting convoys to the United Kingdom and the continent. Between that date and May 1945 she made five round-trip voyages. Her last convoy duty ended at Brooklyn, New York, and she entered the navy yard there for a major overhaul in preparation for duty in the Pacific. Stockdale held gunnery exercises at Guantanamo Bay, Cuba, while en route to Hawaii. The Panama Canal was transited on 8 July, and Stockdale arrived at Pearl Harbor on 25 July. Additional training exercises were conducted until the end of August.

=== Pacific War ===
Stockdale sailed for Honshū, Japan on 1 September as escort for the carrier Matanikau. After a brief stay in Japanese home waters, the ship sailed for Guam and operated as a weather station ship. She then researched the Admiralty Islands for missing service personnel, and made strategic bombing surveys at Rabaul, New Britain, before being ordered back to the east coast in January 1946.

=== Decommissioning and fate ===
Stockdale arrived in Philadelphia, Pennsylvania, on 11 February 1946 for yard availability prior to inactivation. She arrived at Green Cove Springs, Florida, on 21 March and was assigned to the Atlantic Reserve Fleet. Stockdale was decommissioned on 15 June 1946 and was placed out of commission, in reserve until struck from the Navy List on 1 July 1972. Stockdale was sunk as a target off the coast of Florida on 24 May 1974.

== Awards ==
Stockdale received one battle star for World War II service.
