= USS Hurst (DE-250) =

Edsall-class destroyer escort

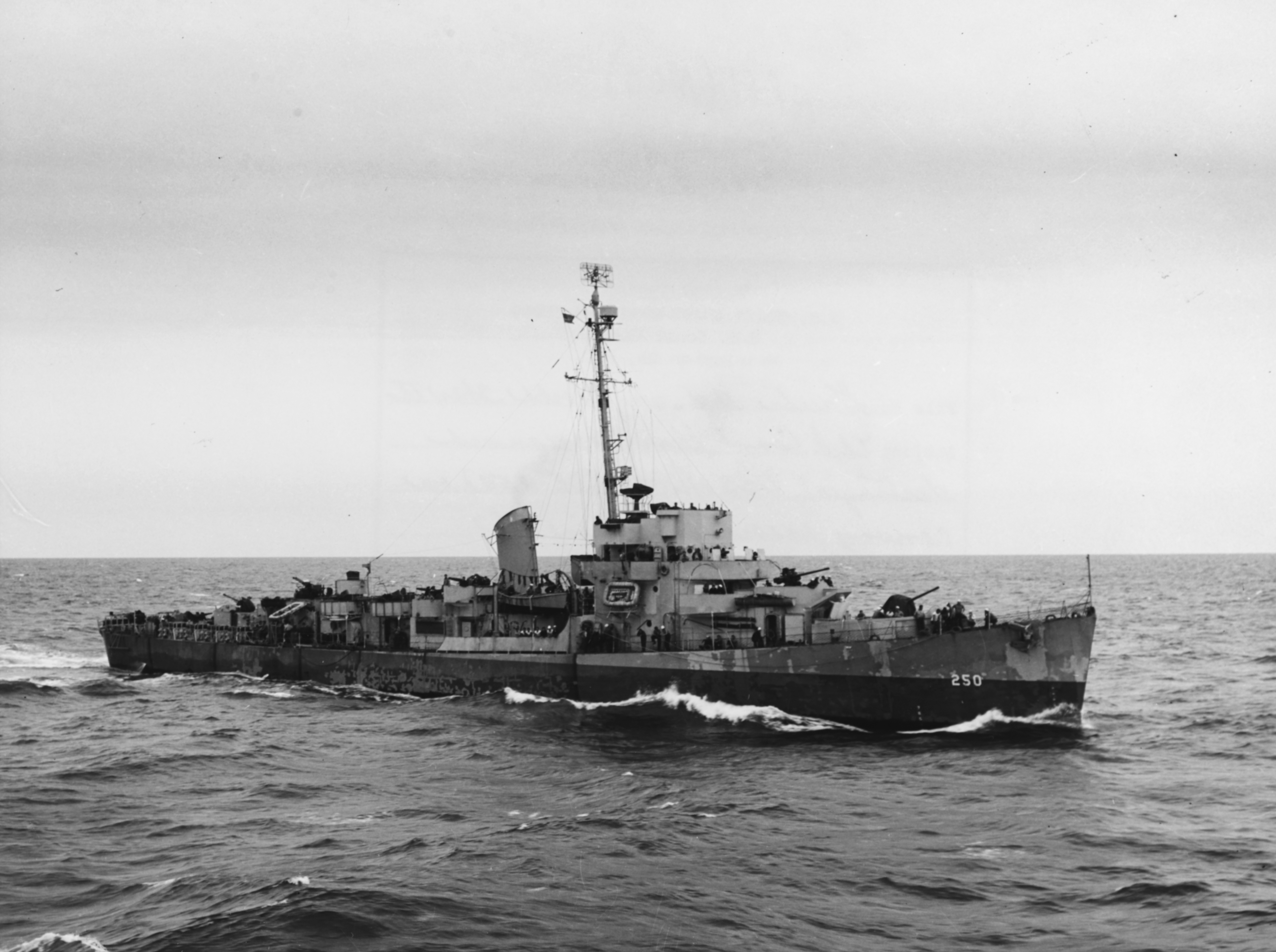

History

United States
- Name: USS Hurst (DE-250)
- Namesake: Edwin William Hurst
- Builder: Brown Shipbuilding Houston, Texas
- Laid down: 27 January 1943
- Launched: 14 April 1943
- Sponsored by: Mrs. Jeanette Harris Hurst
- Commissioned: 30 August 1943
- Decommissioned: 1 May 1946
- Stricken: 1 December 1972
- Fate: transferred to Mexican Navy, 1 October 1973.

Mexico
- Name: ARM Commodore Manuel Azueta (A06)
- Namesake: Manuel Azueta
- Acquired: 1 October 1973
- Decommissioned: 3 July 2015
- Renamed: ARM Commodore Manuel Azueta Perillos (E30), 1994; ARM Commodore Manuel Azueta (D111), 2001
- Fate: Sunk as an artificial reef, 6 November 2017

General characteristics
- Class & type: Edsall-class destroyer escort
- Displacement: 1,253 tons standard; 1,590 tons full load
- Length: 306 ft (93 m)
- Beam: 36.58 ft (11.15 m)
- Draft: 10.42 ft (3.18 m) full load
- Propulsion: 4 FM diesel engines, 4 diesel-generators, 6,000 shp (4.5 MW), 2 screws
- Speed: 21 knots (39 km/h)
- Range: 9,100 nautical miles @ 12 knots (16,900 km @ 22 km/h)
- Complement: 8 officers, 201 enlisted
- Armament: 3 × single 3 in (76 mm)/50 guns; 1 × twin 40 mm AA guns; 8 × single 20 mm AA guns; 1 × triple 21 in (533 mm) torpedo tubes; 8 × depth charge projectors; 1 × depth charge projector (hedgehog); 2 × depth charge tracks

USS Hurst (DE-250) was an Edsall-class destroyer escort in service with the United States Navy from 1943 to 1946. The ship served in both the Atlantic and the Pacific and was decommissioned in May 1946 and placed in reserve for the next 27 years.

In October 1973, the former Hurst was acquired by the Mexican Navy and renamed ARM Comodoro Manuel Azueta (A-06) but was renamed ARM Comodoro Manuel Azueta Perillos in 1994. When she reverted to her original Mexican name in 2001, she was assigned pennant number D-111 and reclassified as destroyer. As of 2014, Comodoro Manuel Azueta remained in active service as a training vessel for Mexico's Gulf Fleet. She was decommissioned in 2015 and sunk as an artificial reef in November 2017.

== Namesake ==
Edwin William Hurst was born on 16 October 1910 at Falls City, Nebraska. His family moved to Sioux Falls, SD and he graduated from Sioux Falls High School in 1928 and received a congressional appointment to the U.S. Naval Academy in Annapolis, MD from which he graduated in 1932. After serving on the USS Tennessee for two years, in 1934 he received orders to report to aviation flight training in Pensacola, FL. He earned his wings in 1935 and in that year he married the former Marian Jeannette Harris, also of Sioux Falls. He was then assigned to Scout Bombing Squadron 3 aboard the USS Saratoga. He was selected for the Naval Postgraduate School in 1939 and completed its course in Ordnance & Gunnery. In May 1941 he reported to Torpedo Squadron 2 aboard USS Lexington to assume the duties of Squadron Executive Officer.

In March 1942, flying his Douglas TBD Devastator he took part in the Salamaua–Lae Raid against Japanese shipping, for his actions on the mission, he was awarded the Distinguished Flying Cross. During the Battle of the Coral Sea on 7 May 1942, he attacked the Japanese aircraft carrier Shōhō and his torpedo contributed to that ship's sinking. The following day his squadron flew against the fleet carriers Shōkaku and Zuikaku. He was credited with pressing home an accurate attack through withering antiaircraft fire to deliver his torpedo against the hull of the Shōkaku, however the torpedo malfunctioned and failed to detonate. Nevertheless, in recognition of his skill and gallantry, he was awarded the Navy Cross. Neither award was processed and approved before his death, so both were actually awarded posthumously.

With the Lexington sunk during the battle, Hurst was sent to New Zealand with half of the VTB-2 survivors. He was killed in a crash on 9 June 1942 near Whenuapai Air Base, New Zealand.

== U.S. Navy career ==
She was laid down in January 1943 and launched in August the same year by the widow of namesake Edwin William Hurst, who had been awarded the Navy Cross and Distinguished Flying Cross earlier in the war. Hurst was launched by Brown Shipbuilding Co., Houston, Texas, 14 April 1943; sponsored by Mrs. Jeanette Harris Hurst, widow of the ship's namesake; and commissioned 30 August 1943.

Hurst departed Houston 3 September and after a short period of outfitting at Galveston, Texas, sailed 12 September for shakedown training off Bermuda. After returning briefly to Charleston, South Carolina, in November and screening a convoy to the Caribbean, Hurst arrived Norfolk, Virginia, 29 November 1943 to join Escort Division 20.

Assigned to protect ocean commerce from submarines, Hurst departed Norfolk with her first convoy 14 December 1943, stopped at Casablanca, and returned to New York 24 January 1944. She then conducted gunnery and antisubmarine warfare exercises in Casco Bay, Maine, before sailing with another convoy from New York 23 February. Enemy action was not the only hazard on such voyages as two days out of New York merchant vessels El Coston and Murfreesboro collided and sank during a heavy gale, the survivors being taken on board one of the escort ships. Hurst reached Lisahally, Co. Londonderry, Northern Ireland, 5 March 1944, and one week later returned to New York with another convoy.

Hurst made no less than 10 more escort voyages from Boston, Massachusetts, or New York to ports in the United Kingdom before returning to New York on 11 June 1945. After her final Atlantic voyage, the destroyer escort sailed with her division for training in Chesapeake Bay and at Guantanamo Bay, Cuba.

Reassigned to the Pacific Fleet for these last months of the war, she transited the Panama Canal and sailed for Pearl Harbor via San Diego, California, arriving at the Hawaiian port on 26 July 1945. There the ship took part in exercises with submarines and departed 27 August for the Samoan Islands on 27 August. Arriving Pago Pago 25 September, Hurst spent the next weeks steaming among the small outlying islands of the Samoan, Fiji, and Society and other island groups, sending parties ashore to search for missing personnel and to investigate possible remaining enemy units. Completing this duty she departed Pago Pago 3 November 1945 and sailed for San Diego via Pearl Harbor. She arrived at San Diego on 23 November and sailed two days later for New York via the Panama Canal.

Hurst entered New York harbor 10 December 1945, sailed to Green Cove Springs, Florida, and was decommissioned there on 1 May 1946. She then entered the Atlantic Reserve Fleet at Green Cove Springs. In January 1947 Hurst was transferred to Orange, Texas. She was struck from the Naval Vessel Register on 1 December 1972. On 1 October 1973, Hurst was transferred to the Mexican Navy.

== Mexican Navy career ==
The former Hurst was acquired by the Mexican Navy on 1 October 1973 and renamed ARM Commodoro Manuel Azueta (A06) after Manuel Azueta Perillos who was Commodore of the Naval Academy during the 1914 United States occupation of Veracruz. In 1994, the ship was renamed ARM Commodoro Manuel Azueta Perillos (E30). At this same time, her armament was modernized with Oto Melara 76 mm compact guns replacing a pair of the original U.S. Navy 3-inch (76 mm) Mark 26 guns. In addition, the superfiring 3-inch gun forward was replaced with a quadruple 40 mm AA mount. By 1998, however, the original armament had been restored.

In 2001, the ship reverted to her original Mexican Navy name of Commodoro Manuel Azueta, was reclassed as a destroyer with the new pennant number of D111, and used primarily as a training vessel for Mexico's Gulf Fleet. In that role, all anti-submarine equipment and all of the original U.S. Navy radar-controlled gun directors were removed. On 3 July 2015 she was decommissioned by the Mexican Navy at Veracruz, making her the last of the class to be retired from service worldwide. Commodoro Manuel Azueta was subsequently stripped and all contaminants were removed prior to disposal as an artificial reef. She was scuttled on 6 November 2017 in the Rizo reef zone off Antón Lizardo, Veracruz.
