= USS Rhodes =

Edsall-class destroyer escort of the US Navy

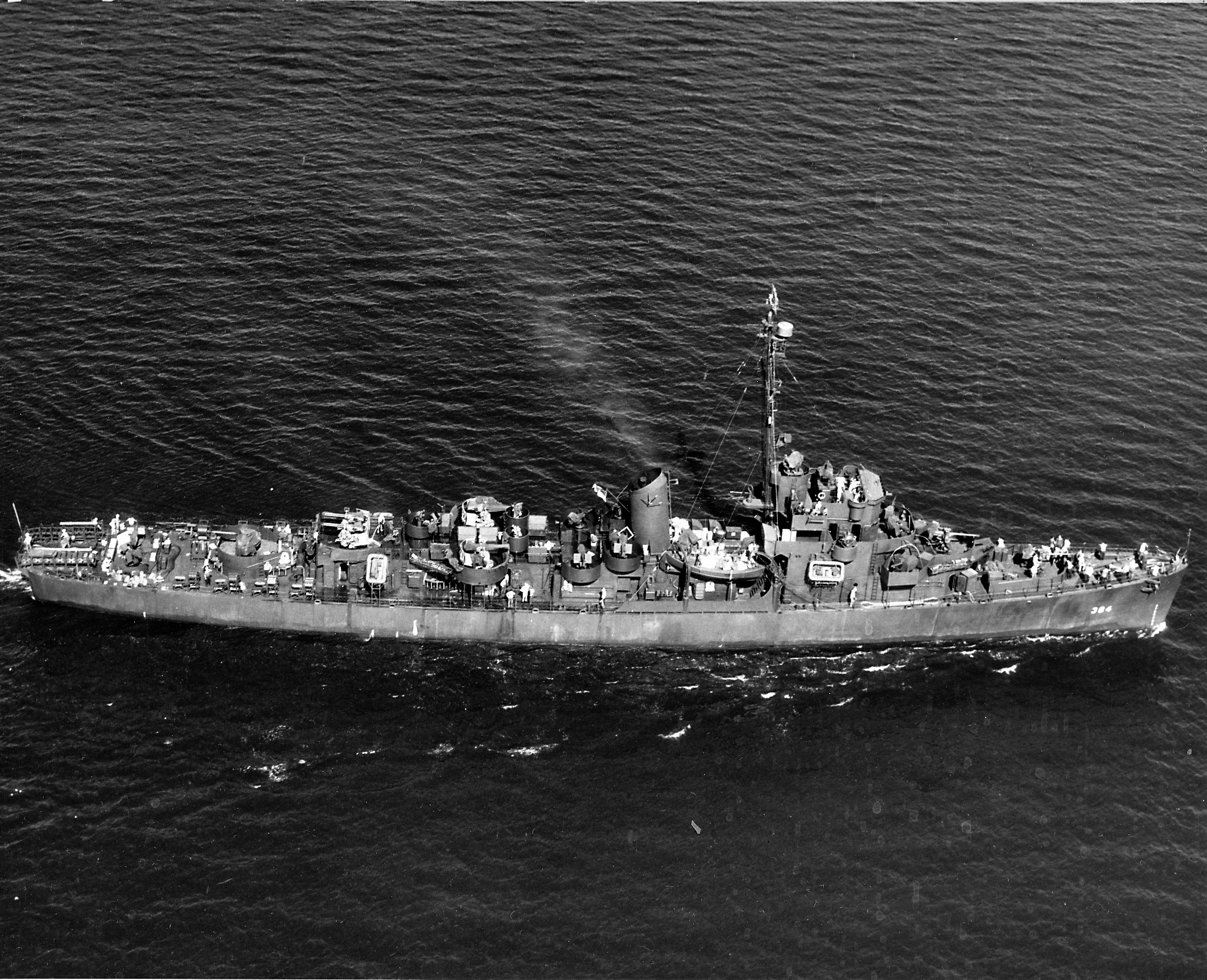

History

United States
- Name: USS Rhodes
- Namesake: Allison Phidel Rhodes
- Builder: Brown Shipbuilding, Houston, Texas
- Laid down: 19 April 1943
- Launched: 29 June 1943
- Commissioned: 25 October 1943
- Decommissioned: 10 July 1963
- Reclassified: DER-384, 28 October 1954
- Stricken: 1 August 1974
- Fate: Sold for scrapping 12 March 1975

General characteristics
- Class & type: Edsall-class destroyer escort
- Displacement: 1,253 tons standard; 1,590 tons full load
- Length: 306 feet (93.27 m)
- Beam: 36.58 feet (11.15 m)
- Draft: 10.42 full load feet (3.18 m)
- Propulsion: 4 FM diesel engines, 4 diesel-generators, 6,000 shp (4.5 MW), 2 screws
- Speed: 21 knots (39 km/h)
- Range: 9,100 nmi. at 12 knots; (17,000 km at 22 km/h)
- Complement: 8 officers, 201 enlisted
- Armament: 3 × single 3 in (76 mm)/50 guns; 1 × twin 40 mm AA guns; 8 × single 20 mm AA guns; 1 × triple 21 in (533 mm) torpedo tubes; 8 × depth charge projectors; 1 × depth charge projector (hedgehog); 2 × depth charge tracks

USS Rhodes (DE-384) was an Edsall-class destroyer escort in service with the United States Navy from 1944 to 1946 and from 1955 to 1963. She was scrapped in 1975.

== Namesake ==
Allison Phidel Rhodes was born on 8 December 1919 in Walhalla, South Carolina. He was appointed Ensign, United States Naval Reserve on 2 June 1941 and after training was ordered to USS Atlanta. Reporting for duty on that vessel on 10 January 1942, serving in the Battle of Midway, the landing on Guadalcanal and the Battle of the Eastern Solomons. Lieutenant (junior grade) Rhodes was killed in action in the Naval Battle of Guadalcanal on 13 November 1942.

== History ==
=== Construction and commissioning ===
Rhodes was laid down by the Brown Shipbuilding Company at Houston, Texas on 19 April 1943, and was launched 29 June 1943. Her sponsor was Mrs. C. E. Rhodes, mother of Lieutenant (junior grade) Rhodes, and was commissioned in October 1943.

=== World War II ===
==== Battle of the Atlantic ====
Following shakedown off Bermuda, Rhodes, manned by a Coast Guard crew and assigned to CortDiv 23, steamed to Norfolk, Virginia, thence to New York City to escort a convoy back to Norfolk. Returning to Norfolk 2 January 1944, she served as a training ship for prospective destroyer escort crews until the 13th, then sailed east, escorting convoy UGS-30 to Gibraltar, where ships of the Royal Navy relieved CortDiv 23. Returning 23 February, she departed Norfolk 13 March for Bizerte escorting the 98-ship convoy UGS-36.

Two days out of Bizerte, 1 April, the convoy was attacked by German bombers and torpedo planes. In the quarter-hour engagement, the escorts and naval gun crews splashed five of the Luftwaffe's "eagles" and kept damage to the "prey" to one cargo ship, which was subsequently towed to Oran. On the 3d the convoy reached Lake Bizerte and on the 11th got underway for New York, arriving 2 May.

Availability, and exercises at Casco Bay, preceded another convoy run to Bizerte where Allied forces were gathering to push further into Axis-occupied Europe. Rhodes completed that run at Boston, Massachusetts, 11 July and, after availability, shifted to the North Atlantic sealanes, escorting six convoys to the United Kingdom and France during the remainder of the war in Europe.

==== Pacific War ====
Following the surrender of Nazi Germany, Rhodes was transferred, with her division, to the Pacific. Transiting the Panama Canal in mid-June 1945, she sailed north, arriving at Adak 8 July and reporting to Commander, Alaskan Sea Frontier, for duty as an escort and air-sea rescue vessel. Detached a week later and temporarily assigned to Task Force TF 92, she escorted that fleet's service group during anti-shipping strikes in the Sea of Okhotsk and the bombardment of the Kuriles (15–21 July). Then resuming operations for the Alaskan Sea Frontier, she remained in the Aleutians until mid-November, when she sailed for Okinawa. Arriving at Buckner Bay 25 November, she joined the U.S. 7th Fleet and in December got underway for Qingdao, where she supported occupation troops until 11 February 1946. She then sailed for the east coast of the United States.

Rhodes retransited the Panama Canal 19 March and arrived at Charleston, South Carolina, to begin inactivation on the 25th. Assigned to the Florida Group, Atlantic Reserve Fleet, she moved south in April and decommissioned 13 June 1946.

=== Cold War ===
Rhodes remained berthed at Mayport, Florida, until 24 July 1954, when she got underway for Norfolk to begin conversion to a radar picket escort ship. Reclassified DER-384, 1 December 1954, she recommissioned 1 August 1955 and on 12 September reported for duty in the Atlantic Fleet.

Assigned to ComCortRon 16, Rhodes conducted exercises in the Caribbean until late November, then returned to Norfolk, Virginia, where she remained into the new year, 1956. Then sailing north, she arrived at Newport, Rhode Island, her homeport, 10 January and commenced 8 years of service on the Atlantic Barrier Patrol, the seaward extension of the Distant Early Warning (DEW) Line. During that period she served on various stations from Argentia to the Azores, interspersing such duty with exercises and operations in the Caribbean, including, in October–November 1962, participation in the Cuban Quarantine. In 1963 Rhodes was again ordered inactivated and in April she steamed to Philadelphia, Pennsylvania, to begin preparations.

=== Decommissioning and fate ===
Decommissioned 10 July 1963, the destroyer escort was struck from the Navy list on 1 August 1974 and sold for scrap to Union Minerals and Alloys Corporation, New York, New York, on 1 March 1975.

== Awards ==
Rhodes earned one battle star during World War II.
