= Brown Shipbuilding =

American shipbuilding company

Coordinates: 29.753°N 95.181°W

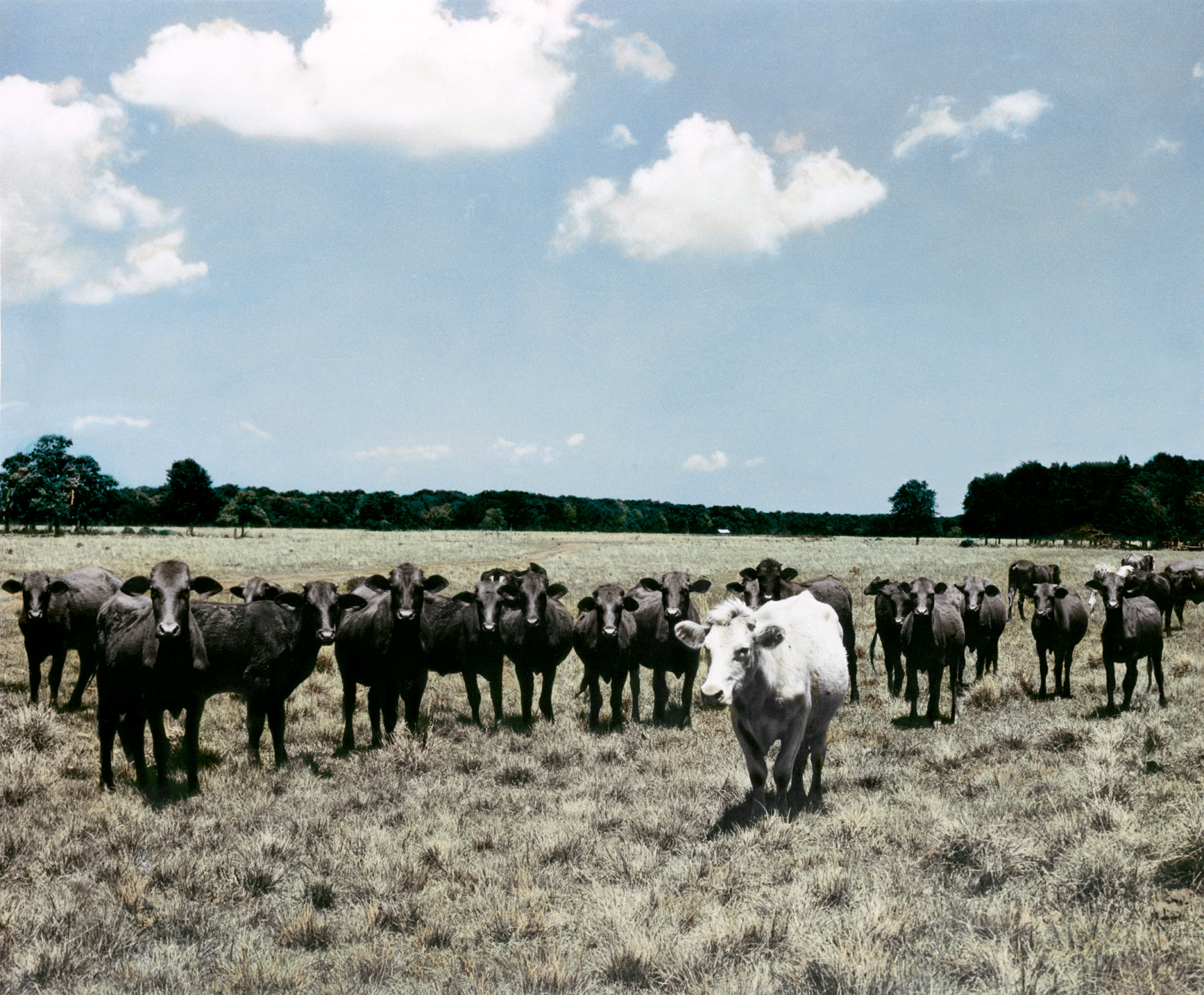
The area for the Manned Spacecraft Center in Houston

The Brown Shipbuilding Company was founded in Houston, Texas, in 1942 as a subsidiary of Brown and Root (now KBR) by brothers Herman and George R. Brown to build ships for the U.S. Navy during World War II. Brown Shipbuilding Company ranked 68th among United States corporations in the value of World War II military production contracts.

In 1941, Navy officials asked the Brown brothers to build four submarine chasers. The brothers had no shipbuilding experience, but had helped build Naval Air Station Corpus Christi. In 1942, the brothers formed Brown Shipbuilding and, with $9 million in Navy funding, built the Green's Bayou Fabrication Yard at the juncture of the Houston Ship Channel and Green's Bayou. After delivering the ships, Brown received orders for landing craft and more sub chasers, and eventually won an order for destroyer escorts at $3.3 million per ship.

Between May 1943 and August 1944, Brown turned out 61 destroyer escorts, an average of one per week. Perhaps the most famous was USS Samuel B. Roberts, part of the outgunned Taffy 3 unit that turned back a Japanese battleship force during the Battle of Leyte Gulf. Brown also built 254 amphibious assault ships, known as LSMs, between May 1944 and March 1946. By the end of the war, it had produced over 350 Navy warships in contracts totaling over $500 million.

After the war, the shipyard was sold to Todd Shipyards. After Todd's Houston division closed in 1985, the yard was once again used by Brown and Root, this time for barge construction and repair. The property was sold piecemeal to multiple buyers in 2004. In 1961, the company won the $200 million contract to build the Manned Spacecraft Center in Houston, Texas.

== Ships built here ==
61 Destroyer escorts (built July 1942 - March 1944)

- 38 of 85 Edsall-class (built July 1942 - December 1943)
  - Stewart (DE-238) (commissioned 31 May 1943)
  - Sturtevant (DE-239) (16 June 1943)
  - Moore (DE-240) (1 July 1943)
  - Keith (DE-241) (19 July 1943)
  - Tomich (DE-242) (27 July 1943)
  - J. Richard Ward (DE-243) (5 August 1943)
  - Otterstetter (DE-244) (6 August 1943)
  - Sloat (DE-245) (16 August 1943)
  - Snowden (DE-246) (23 August 1943)
  - Stanton (DE-247) (7 August 1943)
  - Swasey (DE-248) (31 August 1943)
  - Marchand (DE-249) (8 September 1943)
  - Hurst (DE-250) (30 August 1943)
  - Camp (DE-251) (16 September 1943)
  - Howard D. Crow (DE-252) (27 September 1943)
  - Pettit (DE-253) (23 September 1943)
  - Ricketts (DE-254) (5 October 1943)
  - Sellstrom (DE-255) (12 October 1943)
  - Ramsden (DE-382) (19 October 1943)
  - Mills (DE-383) (12 October 1943)
  - Rhodes (DE-384) (25 October 1943)
  - Richey (DE-385) (30 October 1943)
  - Savage (DE-386) (29 October 1943)
  - Vance (DE-387) (1 November 1943)
  - Lansing (DE-388) (11 October 1943)
  - Durant (DER-389) (16 November 1943)
  - Calcaterra (DE-390) (17 November 1943)
  - Chambers (DE-391) (22 November 1943)
  - Merrill (DE-392) (27 November 1943)
  - Haverfield (DE-393) (29 November 1943)
  - Swenning (DE-394) (1 December 1943)
  - Willis (DE-395) (12 October 1943)
  - Janssen (DE-396) (18 December 1943)
  - Wilhoite (DE-397) (16 December 1943)
  - Cockrill (DE-398) (24 December 1943)
  - Stockdale (DE-399) (31 December 1943)
  - Hissem (DE-400) (13 January 1944)
  - Holder (DE-401) (18 January 1944)
- 23 of 83 John C. Butler-class (built August 1943 - March 1944)
  - Richard S. Bull (DE-402) (commissioned 26 February 1944)
  - Richard M. Rowell (DE-403) (9 March 1944)
  - Eversole (DE-404) (21 March 1944)
  - Dennis (DE-405) (20 March 1944)
  - Edmonds (DE-406) (3 April 1944)
  - Shelton (DE-407) (4 April 1944)
  - Straus (DE-408) (6 April 1944)
  - La Prade (DE-409) (20 April 1944)
  - Jack Miller (DE-410) (13 April 1944)
  - Stafford (DE-411) (19 April 1944)
  - Walter C. Wann (DE-412) (2 May 1944)
  - Samuel B. Roberts (DE-413) (28 April 1944)
  - LeRay Wilson (DE-414) (5 October 1944)
  - Lawrence C. Taylor (DE-415) (13 May 1944)
  - Melvin R. Nawman (DE-416) (16 May 1944)
  - Oliver Mitchell (DE-417) (14 June 1944)
  - Tabberer (DE-418) (23 May 1944)
  - Robert F. Keller (DE-419) (17 June 1944)
  - Leland E. Thomas (DE-420) (19 June 1944)
  - Chester T. O'Brien (DE-421) (3 July 1944)
  - Douglas A. Munro (DE-422) (11 July 1944)
  - Dufilho (DE-423) (21 July 1944)
  - Haas (DE-424) (2 August 1944)

12 of 343 PC-461-class submarine chasers:

- USS PC-565 (25 May 1942)
- PC-566 (15 June 1942) (named Honesdale 1956, to Venezuela 1960 as Calamar, struck 1978)
- PC-567 (27 June 1942) (named Riverhead 1956, to USAF 1960)
- USS PC-568 (13 July 1942)
- PC-608 (18 August 1942) (to Mexico 1952 as Guardacosta, scrapped 1964)
- PC-609 (7 September 1942) (to Thailand 1947 as Khamronsin)
- PC-610 (28 September 1942) (wrecked 1950 and used as a target)
- PC-611 (26 October 1942) (sold to Dulien Steel 1948, scrapped)
- PC 1251 (27 February 1943) (named Ukiah 1956, scrapped 1960)
- PC 1252 (27 March 1943) (named Tarrytown 1956, to Venezuela 1960, used for parts )
- PC 1253 (30 March 1943) (to Thailand as PC-7)
- PC 1254 (13 April 1943) (to Taiwan 1954 as Po Kiang)

32 of 923 Landing Craft Infantry:

- Hull numbers 319 - 350
- LCI(L)-326 (15 February 1943) (sold 1946)
- LCI(L)-327 (31 October 1942) (destroyed at Kwajalein 30 October 1947)
- LCI(L)-328 (31 October 1942) (sold 1946)
- LCI(L)-329 (31 October 1942) (scuttled at Kwajalein 16 March 1948)
- LCI(L)-330 (8 November 1942) (sold 1946 as ferry Siasconset)
- LCI(L)-331 (9 November 1942) (sold 1946)
- LCI(L)-332 (16 November 1942) (scuttled at Kwajalein 28 September 1947)
- LCI(L)-333 (17 November 1942) (destroyed 1946)
- LCI(L)-334 (24 November 1942) (sold 1946)
- LCI(L)-335 (27 November 1942) (to NDRF 1946)
- LCI(L)-336 (3 December 1942)
- LCI(L)-337 (21 December 1942) (sold 1947)
- LCI(L)-338 (26 December 1942) (to NDRF 1948)
- LCI(L)-339 (30 December 1942) (destroyed by aerial bombs at the landing at Lae)
- LCI(L)-340 (12 December 1942) (sold 1946)
- LCI(L)-341 (26 December 1942) (sold 1946)
- LCI(L)-342 (30 December 1942) (to NDRF 1948)
- LCI(L)-343 (8 January 1943) (sold 1946)
- LCI(L)-344 (18 January 1943) (to NDRF 1948)
- LCI(L)-345 (22 January 1943) (sold 1948)
- LCI(L)-346 (25 January 1943) (sold 1946)
- LCI(L)-347 (27 January 1943) (to NDRF 1948)
- LCI(L)-348 (27 January 1943) (to NDRF 1948)
- LCI(L)-349 (31 January 1943) (to NDRF 1948)
- LCI(L)-350 (4 February 1943) (to NDRF 1948)

254 of 558 Landing Ship Medium

- LSM-1 - LSM-125, LSM-354 - LSM-388, LSM-459 - LSM-552

== See also ==
- Shipbuilding
- Ship technology during World War II
