= USS Swenning =

Scrapped American warship of WWII

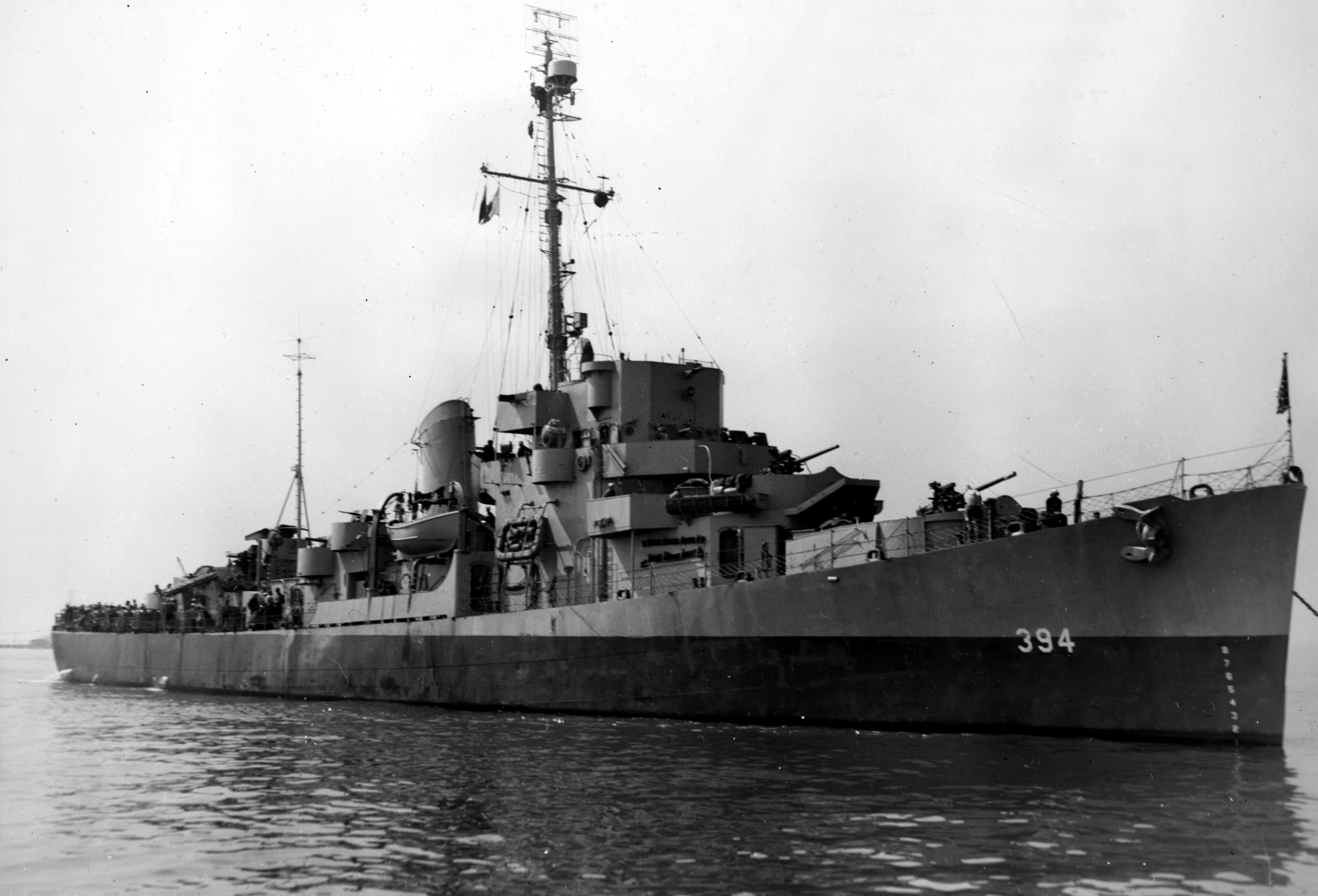

History

United States
- Namesake: Gust J. Swenning
- Builder: Brown Shipbuilding, Houston, Texas
- Laid down: 17 July 1943
- Launched: 13 September 1943
- Commissioned: 1 December 1943
- Decommissioned: 25 September 1947
- Stricken: 1 July 1972
- Fate: Sold for scrapping 17 January 1974

General characteristics
- Class & type: Edsall-class destroyer escort
- Displacement: 1,253 tons standard; 1,590 tons full load
- Length: 306 feet (93.27 m)
- Beam: 36.58 feet (11.15 m)
- Draft: 10.42 full load feet (3.18 m)
- Propulsion: 4 FM diesel engines, 4 diesel-generators, 6,000 shp (4.5 MW), 2 screws
- Speed: 21 knots (39 km/h)
- Range: 9,100 nmi. at 12 knots; (17,000 km at 22 km/h)
- Complement: 8 officers, 201 enlisted
- Armament: 3 × single 3 in (76 mm)/50 guns; 1 × twin 40 mm AA guns; 8 × single 20 mm AA guns; 1 × triple 21 in (533 mm) torpedo tubes; 8 × depth charge projectors; 1 × depth charge projector (hedgehog); 2 × depth charge tracks

USS Swenning (DE-394) was an Edsall-class destroyer escort in service with the United States Navy from 1943 to 1946. She was sold for scrapping in 1974.

== Namesake ==
Gust J. Swenning was born on 2 August 1917 at Manor, Texas. He enlisted in the Navy on 9 September 1938. Upon completion of basic training at San Diego, California, he was transferred to USS New Orleans for duty. After participation in the defense of Pearl Harbor, the Battle of the Coral Sea, the Battle of Midway, and operations off Guadalcanal and in the Solomon Islands, Swenning was still serving in New Orleans on 30 November 1942. That night, Imperial Japanese Navy forces began the Battle of Tassafaronga, Solomon Islands.

Swenning was a member of the Forward Repair Party when New Orleans was struck by a torpedo which detonated the forward magazines. He dived through the oil and water in a flooded compartment to close a watertight door. In further efforts to assist in bringing the damaged ship to port, he labored continuously for twelve hours after the cessation of the action. He died on 1 December 1942 and was posthumously awarded the Navy Cross.

== History ==
Swenning was laid down on 17 July 1943 by the Brown Shipbuilding Co., Houston, Texas; launched on 13 September 1943; sponsored by Miss Hertha Rhode; and commissioned on 1 December 1943.

=== Battle of the Atlantic ===
Swenning moved to Galveston, Texas, to complete fitting out and sailed from there on the 28th en route to Bermuda on her shakedown cruise. The cruise ended at Charleston, South Carolina, where the ship entered the navy yard for a post-shakedown availability period.

She sailed for New York on 14 February as an escort for USS Wake Island (CVE-65) and USS Mission Bay (CVE-59). On the return voyage to Norfolk, Virginia, she was in the escort for convoy UGS-34 and arrived on 20 February. Six days later the ship stood out of Norfolk with Task Group (TG) 21.11, a "hunter-killer" antisubmarine group composed of USS Bogue (CVE-9), a destroyer, and three other escorts of Escort Division (CortDiv) 51.

The task group hunted along the Atlantic sea lanes for German U-boats. On 13 March, aircraft from Bogue in conjunction with USS Haverfield (DE-393), USS Hobson (DD-464) and HMCS Prince Rupert developed and attacked a promising submarine contact. At 1839 hours, the submarine surfaced in full view of the entire task group. It was immediately fired on by the attacking ships and planes from the carrier. At 1844 hours, the German submarine U-575 slid under the water, stern first. Twenty-three survivors were picked up by Hobson and Haverfield. During the action, Swenning maintained her station in the escort screen. The task group refueled and provisioned at Casablanca from 18 to 22 March and continued their offensive patrol. The group replenished at Trinidad on 12 April and sailed to Norfolk where the escorts were detached to proceed to New York for yard availability. Swenning remained at New York from 20 April to 3 May when she returned to Hampton Roads to rejoin the Bogue group, now designated as task group TG 22.2. The ships sortied on 5 May on antisubmarine patrol. They called at Casablanca again to replenish from 29 May to 4 June and put to sea.

On 8 June, Swenning rescued eight members of the RAF whose Halifax bomber had been ditched in the ocean. The task group arrived at Bermuda on 30 June and departed the next day for Norfolk where it was dissolved. The escorts continued to New York, and Swenning was given an overhaul. She returned to Norfolk on 22 July to rejoin the Bogue group (TG 22.3) which sortied three days later. After a short training period at Bermuda, the group began offensive patrols in the North Atlantic, mainly off the Grand Banks area of Newfoundland. On 19 August, Bogue aircraft attacked a surfaced submarine. Damage was not ascertained as the submarine submerged. The following day another was attacked on the surface. It also submerged; but, approximately two and one-half hours later, it surfaced; the crew abandoned it; and the submarine sank shortly thereafter. The ships replenished at Argentia on 24 August and resumed operations until 24 September when the group was dissolved at New York. After a yard period and refresher training in the New London, Connecticut, area, Swenning sailed to Norfolk.

Swenning participated in antisubmarine training off Bermuda with Bogue and CortDiv 51 from 23 October to 21 November and from 26 December 1944 to 16 January 1945. The escort spent February conducting antisubmarine and gunnery exercises at Casco Bay and March training submarines at New London. She began her last Atlantic war patrol on 16 April when CortDiv 51 joined Bogue to form TG 22.3 at Melville, Rhode Island. Until the end of hostilities with Germany, the group was a unit of a north–south submarine barrier patrol as part of Operation Teardrop. The barrier consisted of 24 ships of TG's 22.3, 22.4, 22.8 and Task Unit 22.7.1. Swenning had no significant role in the ensuing action, but the barrier patrols sank five submarines at the expense of one destroyer escort sunk by a torpedo. On 8 May, news of Germany's capitulation reached TG 22.3 which proceeded to New York the next day. The ships arrived there on 11 May, and the task group was dissolved. Swenning steamed to Boston, Massachusetts, and entered the navy yard for an overhaul in preparation for duty in the Pacific. While there, her torpedo tubes were removed and replaced by twin 40 millimeter antiaircraft guns.

=== Pacific War ===
Swenning stood out of Boston, with CortDiv 51, on 30 June en route to the Pacific war zone. A two-week training period was held at Guantánamo Bay before transiting the Panama Canal on 21 July. The division arrived at San Diego, California, on 30 July and stood out for Hawaii two days later. Swenning was at Pearl Harbor from 7 to 20 August when she steamed to Saipan, via Eniwetok, Marshall Islands.

She arrived at Saipan on 30 August and made a round-trip voyage to Okinawa from 5 to 13 September 1945. The DE moved to Guam the following week and assisted in training submarines of the U.S. Pacific Fleet out of that port until 10 January 1946. Swenning departed Guam on that date for the east coast of the United States via Pearl Harbor, She arrived at San Diego on 28 January and proceeded on to Boston, via Panama, and arrived there on 26 February. It was determined that Swenning would be inactivated, and she sailed down the coast to Mayport, Florida, arriving there on 12 April.

=== Decommissioning and fate ===
She was placed out of commission, in reserve, on 18 June 1946. In September the escort was towed to Charleston, South Carolina, for yard availability which lasted until December 1946 when she was towed to Mayport, Florida, and laid up with the Atlantic Reserve Fleet on the St. Johns River at Green Cove Springs, Florida. She was later relocated to the reserve fleet at Orange, Texas following the closure of the Green Cove Springs facility in 1962. Swenning was struck from the Navy list on 1 July 1972 and sold to Northern Metals Co., Philadelphia, Pennsylvania, for scrap on 17 January 1974.
