= USS Cockrill =

1943 Edsall-class destroyer escort

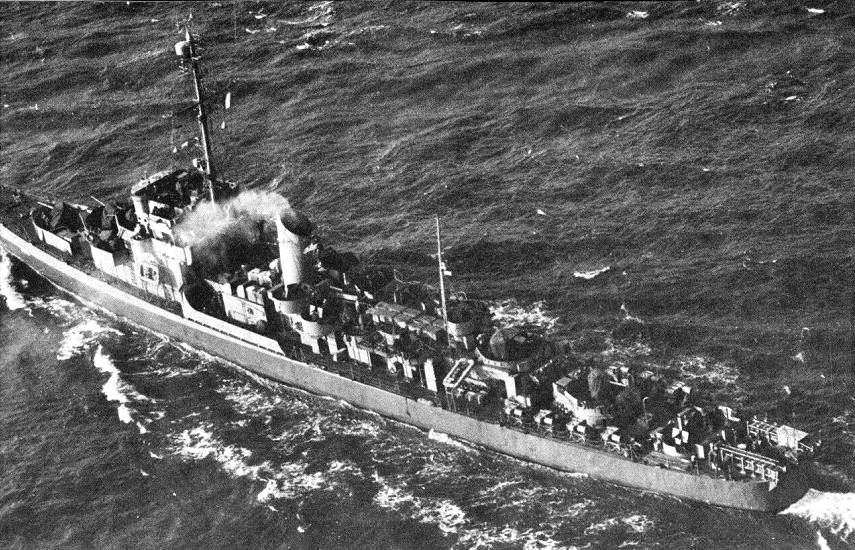

History

United States
- Namesake: Dan Robertson Cockrill
- Builder: Brown Shipbuilding, Houston, Texas
- Laid down: 31 August 1943
- Launched: 29 October 1943
- Commissioned: 24 December 1943
- Decommissioned: 21 June 1946
- Stricken: 1 August 1973
- Fate: Sunk as target off Florida, 19 November 1974

General characteristics
- Class & type: Edsall-class destroyer escort
- Displacement: 1,253 tons standard; 1,590 tons full load
- Length: 306 feet (93.27 m)
- Beam: 36.58 feet (11.15 m)
- Draft: 10.42 full load feet (3.18 m)
- Propulsion: 4 FM diesel engines, 4 diesel-generators, 6,000 shp (4.5 MW), 2 screws
- Speed: 21 knots (39 km/h)
- Range: 9,100 nmi. at 12 knots; (17,000 km at 22 km/h)
- Complement: 8 officers, 201 enlisted
- Armament: 3 × single 3 in (76 mm)/50 guns; 1 × twin 40 mm AA guns; 8 × single 20 mm AA guns; 1 × triple 21 in (533 mm) torpedo tubes; 8 × depth charge projectors; 1 × depth charge projector (hedgehog); 2 × depth charge tracks

USS Cockrill (DE-398) was an Edsall-class destroyer escort in service with the United States Navy from 1943 to 1946. After spending decades in reserve, she was sunk as a target in November 1974.

== Namesake ==
Dan Robertson Cockrill was born on 27 March 1914 in Nashville, Tennessee. He was appointed Ensign on 18 May 1935. He reported for active duty 16 June 1941, and joined the destroyer USS Meredith on 22 October 1941. He died 19 October 1942 as a result of injuries suffered 4 days earlier when Meredith was torpedoed.

== History ==
She was launched on 29 October 1943 by the Brown Shipbuilding Company in Houston, Texas, sponsored by Mrs. Cockrill, mother of Dan Cockrill. She was commissioned on 24 December 1943 and reported to the United States Atlantic Fleet for duty.

=== Battle of the Atlantic ===
Cockrill cleared Norfolk, Virginia, on 23 February 1944 on convoy escort duty bound for Casablanca, French Morocco, returning to the United States at New York City on 5 April 1944. After training and repairs, she conducted various operations off the United States East Coast until 24 July 1944, when she cleared Norfolk for a convoy to Bizerte, French Tunisia, returning to New York on 7 September 1944. Coastwise escort duty and training at Bermuda followed until 4 December 1944, when she put to sea for a submarine search in the Gulf of Mexico. She voyaged to Bermudan waters from 26 December 1944 to 16 January 1945 for operational training with the escort unit centered around the escort aircraft carrier USS Bogue (CVE-9), and then took part in carrier qualification training in Narragansett Bay and training at Casco Bay.

From 11 April to 11 May 1945 Cockrill was on an antisubmarine patrol with the Bogue group. Taking station in a barrier of carrier groups in position from Greenland to the Carolinas against a large number of German submarines (U-boats), Cockrill participated on 24 April 1945 in an attack on U-546, which was forced to the surface and was scuttled by its crew.

=== Pacific War ===
Cockrill sailed from New York 19 May for Charleston, South Carolina; Guantánamo Bay, Cuba; the Panama Canal, and San Diego, California where she arrived on 14 July 1945. Two days later she cleared for Pearl Harbor; Hawaii, for training until 20 August 1945, when she sailed for Saipan, arriving 30 August 1945. Assigned to convoy escort duty, she operated from Saipan and Guam to Okinawa and Japanese ports in support of the occupation of Japan. She continued training based at Guam from 14 November 1945 to 11 January 1946, then departed Guam to call at San Pedro, California, before continuing to Boston, Massachusetts, where she arrived on 26 February 1946.

=== Decommissioning and fate ===
After coastwise operations, Cockrill reported to the Reserve Fleet at Green Cove Springs, Florida, where she was decommissioned on 21 June 1946. She never returned to active service. On 1 August 1973 she was struck from the Navy list and on 19 November 1974 she was sunk as target off Florida.
