= USS Dufilho =

Destroyer escort of the United States Navy

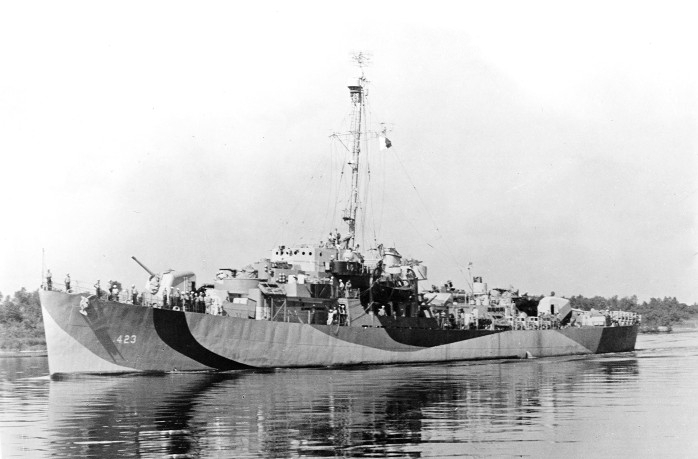
- USS Dufilho (DE-423) underway off Houston, Texas on 24 July 1944

History

United States
- Name: Dulfiho
- Namesake: Marion William Dufilho
- Builder: Brown Shipbuilding, Houston, Texas
- Laid down: 31 January 1944
- Launched: 9 March 1944
- Commissioned: 21 July 1944
- Decommissioned: 14 May 1946
- Stricken: 1 December 1972
- Fate: Sold for scrapping 12 September 1973

General characteristics
- Class & type: John C. Butler-class destroyer escort
- Displacement: 1,350 long tons (1,372 t)
- Length: 306 ft (93 m)
- Beam: 36 ft 8 in (11 m)
- Draft: 9 ft 5 in (3 m)
- Propulsion: 2 boilers, 2 geared turbine engines, 12,000 shp; 2 propellers
- Speed: 24 knots (44 km/h)
- Range: 6,000 nmi. (12,000 km) @ 12 kt
- Complement: 14 officers, 201 enlisted
- Armament: 2 × single 5 in (127 mm) guns; 2 × twin 40 mm (1.6 in) AA guns; 10 × single 20 mm (0.79 in) AA guns; 1 × triple 21 in (533 mm) torpedo tubes; 8 × depth charge throwers; 1 × Hedgehog ASW mortar; 2 × depth charge racks

USS Dufilho (DE-423), was a John C. Butler-class destroyer escort.

== Namesake ==
Marion William Dufilho was born on 22 May 1916 in Opelousas, Louisiana. He graduated from the Naval Academy on 2 June 1938. He was Edward O'Hare's wingman during O'Hare's Medal of Honor flight on 20 February, 1942. On 24 August 1942, while serving as a section leader in Fighting Squadron 5 operating from the USS Saratoga, he was killed in action in the Battle of the Eastern Solomons. He was posthumously awarded both the Navy Cross and the Distinguished Flying Cross.

== Construction and commissioning ==
She was laid down 31 January 1944 by Brown Shipbuilding of Houston, Texas, launched 9 March 1944, sponsored by Mrs. M. W. Dufilho, widow of Lieutenant Dufilho, and commissioned 21 July 1944.

== History ==
USS Dufilho escorted USS Vixen with Admiral Royal E. Ingersoll, Commander-in-Chief, Atlantic Fleet embarked on a tour of inspection of the Caribbean naval bases between 18 September and 19 October 1944. After a voyage to Casablanca, French Morocco, as escort for USS Kasaan Bay from 24 October to 14 November, Dufilho sailed from Norfolk 7 December for the Pacific, passed through the Panama Canal on 17 December, crossed the equator on 20 December, and arrived at Manus, Admiralty Islands, 15 January 1945.

Dufilho got underway for Leyte on 23 January 1945 but was diverted to Morotai to join the escort for a convoy of 80 tank landing ships (LSTs) bound with reinforcements of men and supplies for Lingayen Gulf, Luzon. She patrolled there on 9 and 10 February while the men and supplies were unloaded, then sailed to San Pedro Bay, Leyte, 14 February. She continued to escort supply convoys from Morotai and Leyte to Subic Bay and Lingayen Gulf until the 27th when she was assigned to the San Bernardino-Verde Islands Minesweeping unit guarding minecraft as they cleared the sea lane to Manila, as well as taking part in naval and amphibious operations along this route. Arriving at Subic Bay 6 March, Dufilho operated on anti-submarine patrol and escort duty.

Between 26 April and 5 July 1945, Dufilho joined in the Borneo operation, escorting shipping from the Philippines and Mios Woendi to Morotai in preparation for the landings at Tarakan and Brunei Bay in May and June. She convoyed reinforcements to Tarakan, and patrolled off the beaches during the assaults at Brunei Bay, escorted support troops in, and returned with empty landing craft to San Pedro Bay.

After brief overhaul, Dufilho patrolled out of Leyte on antisubmarine, air-sea rescue, weather reporting and escort duty. On 2 August 1945 she aided in the rescue of survivors from USS Indianapolis. Lieutenant Commander Nienau, the circulation man for the Seattle Star before the war, pieced together radio messages regarding "debris in the water" and sped to the debris coordinates. Arriving after dark, Dufilho lookouts spotted a lone survivor. While the whaleboat was picking him up, Dufilho's sonar picked up a strong sonar contact only 900 yards (820 m) away. Concerned the Japanese submarine might still be lurking in the area, Dufilho attacked with depth charges and hedgehogs. After 20 minutes with no evidence of a destroyed submarine, Dufilho picked up the whaleboat and survivor and commenced screening for the rescue operation until 1615 the following afternoon, when she was released to return to Leyte.

Following a voyage to Okinawa to convoy LSTs and LSMs to Leyte for repairs, Dufilho sailed from Leyte 6 September and after calling at Okinawa, arrived at Shanghai 22 September, the first ship to enter Shanghai harbor in four years. She operated on a variety of duties at port and Hong Kong until 5 January 1946 when she sailed for the west coast. Dufilho stopped in Pearl Harbor before arriving at San Diego 12 February and was decommissioned on 14 May 1946. Dufilho was stricken from the inventory on 1 December 1972 and was sold for scrapping on 1 August 1973 by the Defense Reutilization and Marketing Service.
