= USS Moore =

1942 Edsall-class destroyer escort

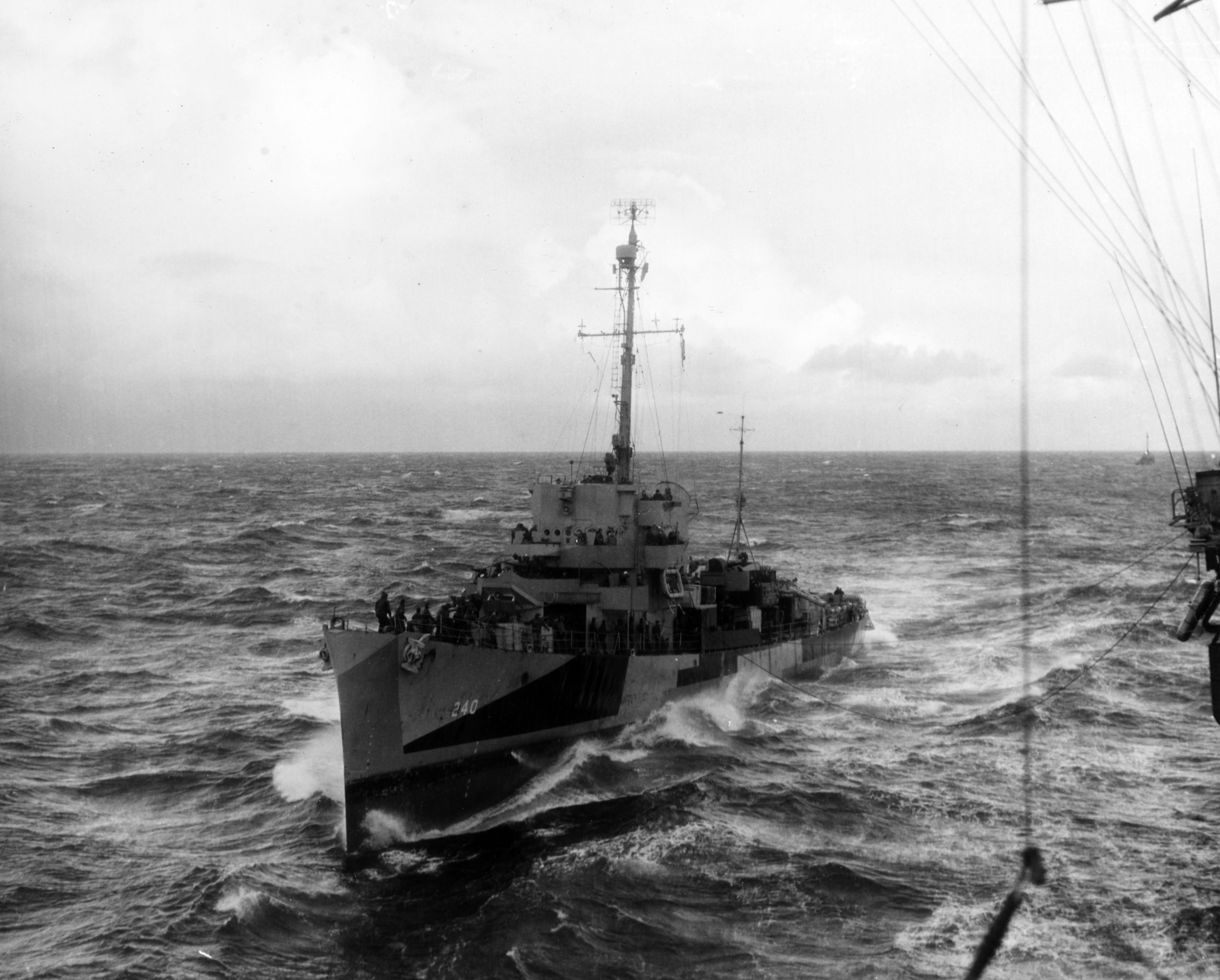

History

United States
- Namesake: Fred Kenneth Moore
- Builder: Brown Shipbuilding Houston, Texas
- Laid down: 20 July 1942
- Launched: 21 December 1942
- Commissioned: 1 July 1943
- Decommissioned: 30 June 1947
- Stricken: 1 August 1973
- Fate: Sunk as target off Virginia 13 June 1975

General characteristics
- Class & type: Edsall-class destroyer escort
- Displacement: 1,253 tons standard; 1,590 tons full load
- Length: 306 feet (93.27 m)
- Beam: 36.58 feet (11.15 m)
- Draft: 10.42 full load feet (3.18 m)
- Propulsion: 4 FM diesel engines, 4 diesel-generators, 6,000 shp (4.5 MW), 2 screws
- Speed: 21 knots (39 km/h)
- Range: 9,100 nmi. at 12 knots; (17,000 km at 22 km/h)
- Complement: 8 officers, 201 enlisted
- Armament: 3 × single 3 in (76 mm)/50 guns; 1 × twin 40 mm AA guns; 8 × single 20 mm AA guns; 1 × triple 21 in (533 mm) torpedo tubes; 8 × depth charge projectors; 1 × depth charge projector (hedgehog); 2 × depth charge tracks

USS Moore (DE-240) was an Edsall-class destroyer escort built for the U.S. Navy during World War II. She served in the Atlantic Ocean the Pacific Ocean and provided destroyer escort protection against submarine and air attack for Navy vessels and convoys.

== Namesake ==
Fred Kenneth Moore was born on 17 December 1921 at Campbell, Texas. He attended Lone Oak High School in Lone Oak, Texas. He enlisted in the United States Navy on 31 July 1940. He was serving on the USS Arizona at Pearl Harbor on 7 December 1941 when the Attack on Pearl Harbor took place. Seaman Moore remained at his station on antiaircraft gun No. 1 in spite of orders to take cover when the Japanese strafing became severe. With two other members of the gun crew, he assisted in keeping the gun in operation until he was killed by an explosion. He was posthumously awarded the Navy Cross.

== Construction and commissioning ==
Moore (DE 240) was laid down 20 July 1942 at the Brown Shipbuilding Co., Houston, Texas; launched 20 December 1942; sponsored by Mrs. Fred Moore, mother of Seaman Fred K. Moore; and commissioned 1 July 1943.

== World War II North Atlantic operations ==
Following shakedown off Bermuda, Moore steamed to Norfolk, Virginia, where she reported for duty with task force TF 63, then escorted merchant convoys, beginning 10 September 1943. Before the end of the year she had transited the Atlantic to North Africa twice. On 13 January 1944, she relieved USS Decker (DE-47) for a month of operations off the New England coast under Com Fleet Air Wing, Quonset Point, Rhode Island. In March, she sailed to Casco Bay, Maine, for abbreviated training exercises and then headed south to Norfolk where she joined task group TG 24.14 and sailed, on the 15th, in the screen of USS Tripoli (CVE-64) for antisubmarine patrol duty west of the Cape Verde Islands. A unit of the U.S. 4th Fleet for under 2 months, she returned to Norfolk, 27 April, and, in May, continued her patrols with Tripoli in the North Atlantic, from Bermuda to Argentia, Newfoundland, in TG 22.4.

Detached for the month of July, she conducted coastal operations and escort work, and completed one escort run to Bermuda before resuming operations with TG 22.4, assigned this time to USS Core (CVE-13). For the remainder of the war in Europe she operated with Core, cruising along the east coast and in the western Atlantic from Cuba to Newfoundland.

== Reassigned to the Pacific Fleet ==
On 11 May 1945, she put into Tompkinsville, shifting later to Brooklyn and then to Boston, Massachusetts, for overhaul preparatory to her reassignment to the Pacific Fleet. She got underway for the Pacific, with others of her division, CortDiv 7, for which she served as flagship, 24 June. On 4 August she arrived at Pearl Harbor, where, 10 days later, she received word of the Japanese agreement to Allied surrender terms. On the 20th, she resumed her westward voyage and arrived, on the 29th, at Saipan. There she reported to TF 94 for post war duty under Com Marianas area. Assigned to the Bonin Volcano area she anchored off western Iwo Jima, 3 September, and a few days later commenced air sea rescue operations with Fleet Air Wing 18.

== Postwar decommissioning ==
Moore returned to the United States in late 1946 with orders to report to the Atlantic Reserve Fleet for inactivation. That work, begun in January 1947, was completed 30 June, when Moore decommissioned and joined the 16th Fleet. Berthed originally at Green Cove Springs, Florida, she was later transferred to the Norfolk Reserve Group. She was struck from the Navy list on 1 August 1973 and sunk as a target off Virginia, 13 June 1975.
