= USS Straus =

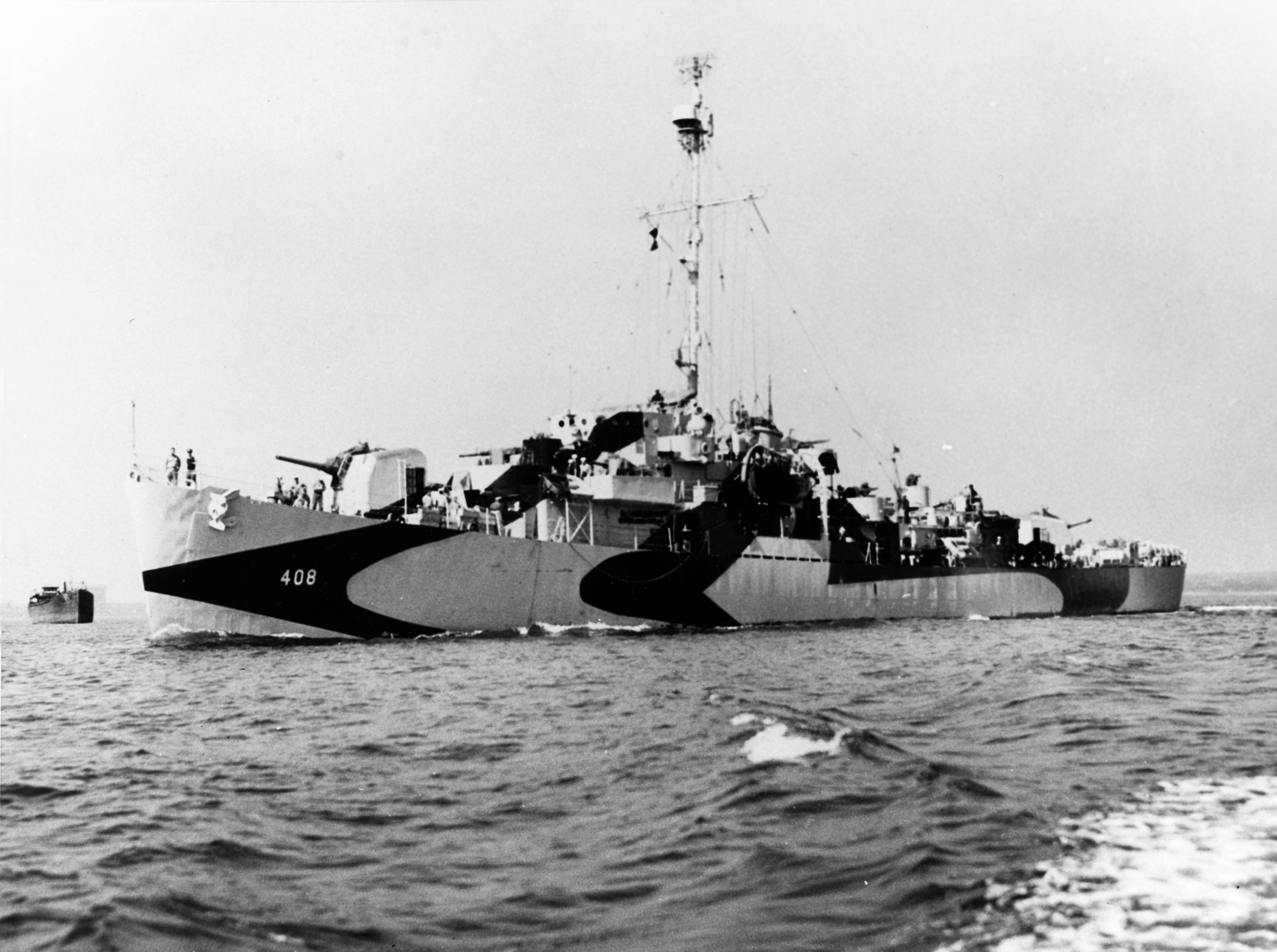
- USS Straus (DE-408) on 8 June 1944

History

United States
- Name: Straus
- Namesake: David H. Straus
- Builder: Brown Shipbuilding, Houston, Texas
- Laid down: 18 November 1943
- Launched: 30 December 1943
- Commissioned: 6 April 1944
- Decommissioned: 15 January 1947
- Stricken: 1 May 1966
- Fate: Sunk as target, August 1973

General characteristics
- Class & type: John C. Butler-class destroyer escort
- Displacement: 1,350 long tons (1,372 t)
- Length: 306 ft (93 m)
- Beam: 36 ft 8 in (11.18 m)
- Draft: 9 ft 5 in (2.87 m)
- Propulsion: 2 boilers, 2 geared turbine engines, 12,000 shp (8,900 kW); 2 propellers
- Speed: 24 knots (44 km/h)
- Range: 6,000 nautical miles (11,000 km) at 12 knots (22 km/h)
- Complement: 14 officers, 201 enlisted
- Armament: 2 × single 5 in (127 mm) guns; 2 × twin 40 mm (1.6 in) AA guns; 10 × single 20 mm (0.79 in) AA guns; 1 × triple 21 in (533 mm) torpedo tubes; 8 × depth charge throwers; 1 × Hedgehog ASW mortar; 2 × depth charge racks

USS Straus (DE-408) was a John C. Butler-class destroyer escort in service with the United States Navy from 1944 to 1947. She was finally sunk as a target in 1973.

== History ==
She was named in honor of Storekeeper Second Class David H. Straus, Jr. born in Houston, Tex., on 13 August 1916, who was killed during the Battle of the Coral Sea. The ship's keel was laid down on 18 November 1943 by the Brown Shipbuilding Co., of Houston, Texas. The destroyer escort was launched on 30 December 1943, sponsored by Mrs. David Straus, and commissioned on 6 April 1944.

=== Atlantic Ocean operations ===
Straus was fitted out and held sea trials at Galveston, Texas, until 25 April when she sailed to Bermuda for her shakedown cruise. She then sailed to Boston, Massachusetts, for a post-shakedown overhaul from 28 May to 9 June. The ship arrived at Norfolk, Virginia, on 11 June and sailed for Panama the following week as an escort for the oiler USS Mississinewa. The oiler loaded at Aruba, off Venezuela, on 23 and 24 June and continued to Panama. On the evening of 24 June, the escort attacked a sound contact with depth charges and her Hedgehog anti-submarine mortar. Oil slicks and bubbles rose to the surface, but Straus had to break off the attack to rejoin Mississinewa. Straus left the oiler at Cristóbal and transited the Panama Canal on 26 June to sail independently to California.

=== Transfer to the Pacific Fleet ===
Straus stopped at San Diego, California, for voyage repairs from 6 to 9 July and then sailed westward, arriving at Pearl Harbor on 16 July. Eight days later, she sailed for the Marshall Islands. The destroyer escort arrived at Eniwetok on 2 August and was assigned to the convoy screen which sailed three days later for the Marianas and arrived off Saipan on 10 August. Straus was assigned to local antisubmarine patrol. On 13 August, she rescued two U.S. Army airmen from a piece of driftwood and put them ashore. From 14 August to 14 September, Straus escorted convoys between Eniwetok and Guam. On the latter date, the ship was assigned to the U.S. 3rd Fleet.

=== Rescuing Japanese adrift at sea ===
Straus stood out of Apra Harbor, Guam, on 17 September with a replenishment unit to join the main logistics group, Task Group (TG) 30.8, that was supporting the fast carriers of Task Force (TF) 38. The ship was detached from the screen on 23 September to investigate a life raft reported west of Cocos Island. She found a raft carrying three Japanese Army officers and two enlisted men. A boat was dispatched to tow the raft to the ship. Before the boat reached the raft, the two enlisted men had committed suicide. The other three surrendered peacefully, after one was disarmed of a hand grenade. The next day, Straus steamed for a rendezvous with the 3rd Fleet for refueling and replenishment operations, after which her unit returned to Saipan. She sailed for Eniwetok on 1 October; and, upon her arrival three days later, she resumed convoy duty.

=== Intercepting infiltrating swimmers ===
Straus sailed with a Ulithi-bound convoy on 8 October and arrived five days later. She became station ship for the Commander, Western Carolines, Patrol and Escort Group. The destroyer escort moved to the Palau Islands on 15 November, with her division, Escort Division 65, and was assigned to the screen around Peleliu and Angaur. On 18 November, a report was received that enemy swimmers were moving from Eli Malk Island, under cover of darkness, toward Peleliu. Straus provided star shell illumination while a landing craft flotilla attacked the swimmers with machine guns and eliminated them. The ship returned to Ulithi on 26 November, and resumed her former duties until March 1945 when she was attached to the U.S. 5th Fleet.

Straus departed Ulithi on 26 March with a task unit en route to rendezvous with task group TG 50.8, the main logistics group that was refueling and replenishing the fast carriers during the Okinawa operations. She remained with the group until 26 June. Two days later, she sailed from Ulithi with a convoy en route to Okinawa. The ships arrived on 2 July, and Straus was assigned to antisubmarine patrol. The destroyer escort continued operating in the Okinawa area after the cessation of hostilities with Japan.

=== End-of-war operations ===
On 19 September, she sailed with a task unit for Japan and arrived at Sasebo the following day. The force consisted of a cruiser accompanied by five destroyers to provide a show of force before occupation forces arrived.

Straus was detached before the amphibious forces arrived to join two aircraft carriers that were steaming off Kyūshū with ready air support in case the Japanese offered resistance. She returned to Sasebo on 25 September and remained there until 15 October when she weighed anchor for the United States. After port calls at Saipan and Pearl Harbor, the destroyer escort arrived at San Diego on 5 November 1945 to begin inactivation.

=== Post-war decommissioning ===
Straus remained inactive at the Naval Repair Base until 15 January 1947 when she was decommissioned and attached to the San Diego Group of the Pacific Reserve Fleet. Straus was struck from the Navy List on 1 May 1966 and used as a target in August 1973.

== Awards ==
Straus received three battle stars for World War II service.
