= USS Otterstetter =

1943 Edsall-class destroyer escort

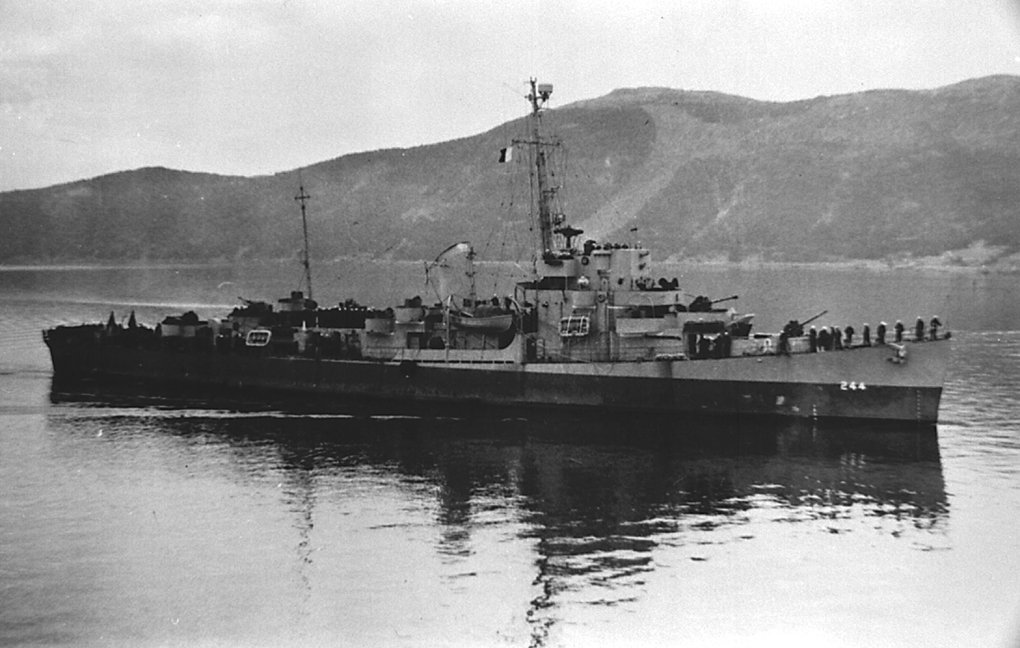

History

United States
- Namesake: Carl William Otterstetter
- Builder: Brown Shipbuilding Houston, Texas
- Laid down: 9 November 1942
- Launched: 19 January 1943
- Commissioned: 6 August 1943
- Decommissioned: 20 June 1960
- Stricken: 1 August 1974
- Fate: Sunk as a target off Puerto Rico 15 February 1976

General characteristics
- Class & type: Edsall-class destroyer escort
- Displacement: 1,253 tons standard; 1,590 tons full load
- Length: 306 feet (93.27 m)
- Beam: 36.58 feet (11.15 m)
- Draft: 10.42 full load feet (3.18 m)
- Propulsion: 4 FM diesel engines, 4 diesel-generators, 6,000 shp (4.5 MW), 2 screws
- Speed: 21 knots (39 km/h)
- Range: 9,100 nmi. at 12 knots; (17,000 km at 22 km/h)
- Complement: 8 officers, 201 enlisted
- Armament: 3 × single 3 in (76 mm)/50 guns; 1 × twin 40 mm AA guns; 8 × single 20 mm AA guns; 1 × triple 21 in (533 mm) torpedo tubes; 8 × depth charge projectors; 1 × depth charge projector (hedgehog); 2 × depth charge tracks

USS Otterstetter (DE-244) was an Edsall-class destroyer escort built for the U.S. Navy during World War II. She served in the Atlantic Ocean the Pacific Ocean and provided destroyer escort protection against submarine and air attack for Navy vessels and convoys.

== Namesake ==
Carl William Otterstetter was born on 11 January 1920 at Moorhead, Minnesota. He enlisted in the Navy as Apprentice Seaman at San Francisco, California on 18 September 1940. He was advanced to Seaman Second Class 18 January 1941 and transferred to Commander Patrol Wing Two on 3 April. He was killed in action during the Japanese Attack on Pearl Harbor on 7 December 1941. He received a citation for prompt and efficient action and utter disregard of personal danger in the effort to repel the attack on the Naval Air Station Kaneohe Bay, Oahu.

== Construction and commissioning ==
Otterstetter was laid down 9 November 1942 by Brown Shipbuilding Co., Houston, Texas; launched 19 January 1943; sponsored by Mrs. Miles P. Refo Jr.; commissioned 6 August 1943.

== World War II North Atlantic operations ==
Otterstetter sailed on her shakedown cruise along the East Coast of the United States and on 14 November joined a convoy and steamed as escort from Norfolk, Virginia, to Casablanca, French Morocco. She arrived there on 2 December 1943 and returned to New York on Christmas Day. She made a convoy escort voyage to Casablanca in February 1944.

On 24 May Otterstetter made the first of three voyages to Argentia, Newfoundland, escorting convoys en route to the United Kingdom.

== Transfer to the Pacific Fleet ==
On 16 July 1945 Otterstetter sailed for Pearl Harbor via Guantánamo Bay, Panama Canal, and San Diego, California. After a brief training in Hawaiian waters, she proceeded to Saipan, arriving 29 August. The following day she sailed for Iwo Jima, arriving on 1 September 1945.

Otterstetter remained at Iwo Jima for a short time, then sailed for Empire waters, arriving 3 November. She returned to the Marianas Islands 2 December and sailed for Okinawa 29 December, before steaming on to Tokyo. She arrived at Tokyo on the last day of the year 1945.

On 4 January 1946 Otterstetter got underway for Jinsen, Korea, returning to Okinawa 14 February. Otterstetter arrived at Sasebo, Japan, on 29 March and at Shanghai, China, on 6 April. Two days later she sailed for Pearl Harbor via Okinawa and then on to the Panama Canal. She transited the canal and arrived at Charleston, South Carolina, 15 May.

Otterstetter underwent a pre-inactivation overhaul and departed for Green Cove Springs, Florida, 10 September. The ship was placed out of commission in reserve 21 September and attached to the Florida Group, Atlantic Reserve Fleet.

== Post-War Conversion to Radar Picket Ship ==
On 1 June 1951, Charleston Naval Shipyard commenced the dual procedure of reactivating Otterstetter and converting her from a destroyer escort to a radar picket destroyer escort.

Reclassified DER-244 in December 1951, Otterstetter recommissioned at Charleston Naval Shipyard 6 June 1952. On 19 July 1952 Otterstetter reported to Commander Destroyer Force, U.S. Atlantic Fleet, as a unit of Escort Squadron Sixteen.

After a shakedown cruise to Guantánamo Bay she sailed 4 December for her first picket in the contiguous radar coverage of the Atlantic Coast, searching for and reporting aircraft in her sectors of responsibility. She continued these duties for the next several years.

== Final Decommissioning ==
Otterstetter was decommissioned 20 June 1960 and was berthed at the reserve fleet on the Sabine River in Texas. On 15 February 1976 she was sunk as a target off Puerto Rico.
