= USS Calcaterra =

Edsall-class destroyer escort

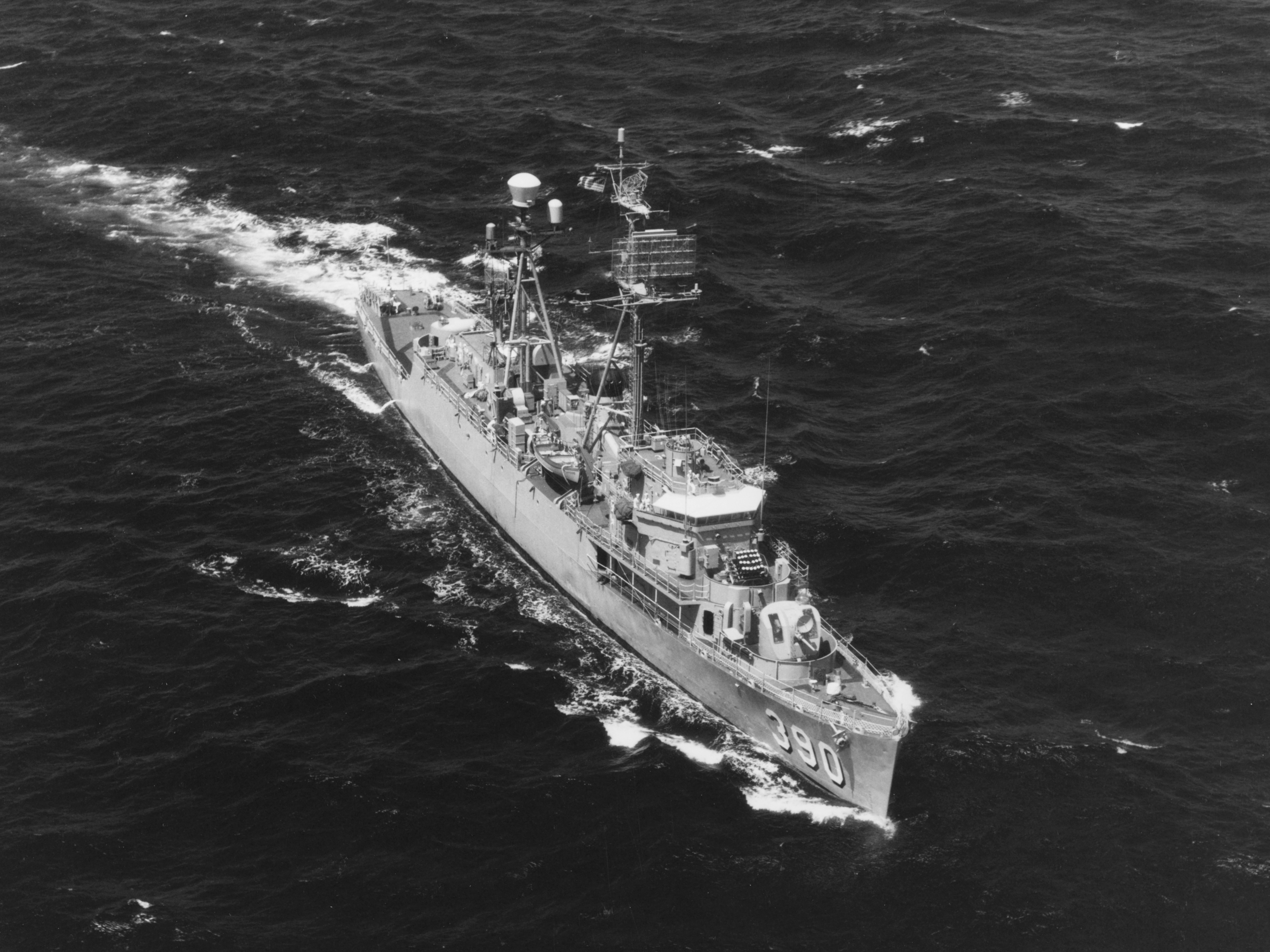
- USS Calcaterra (DER-390) underway, circa in the 1960s

History

United States
- Namesake: Herbert A. Calcaterra
- Builder: Brown Shipbuilding, Houston, Texas
- Laid down: 28 May 1943
- Launched: 16 August 1943
- Commissioned: 17 November 1943
- Decommissioned: 2 July 1973
- Reclassified: DER-390, 28 October 1954
- Stricken: 2 July 1973
- Fate: Sold 14 May 1974 and broken up for scrap

General characteristics
- Class & type: Edsall-class destroyer escort
- Displacement: 1,253 tons standard; 1,590 tons full load
- Length: 306 feet (93.27 m)
- Beam: 36.58 feet (11.15 m)
- Draft: 10.42 full load feet (3.18 m)
- Propulsion: 4 FM diesel engines, 4 diesel-generators, 6,000 shp (4.5 MW), 2 screws
- Speed: 21 knots (39 km/h)
- Range: 9,100 nmi. at 12 knots; (17,000 km at 22 km/h)
- Complement: 8 officers, 201 enlisted
- Armament: 3 × single 3 in (76 mm)/50 guns; 1 × twin 40 mm AA guns; 8 × single 20 mm AA guns; 1 × triple 21 in (533 mm) torpedo tubes; 8 × depth charge projectors; 1 × depth charge projector (hedgehog); 2 × depth charge tracks

USS Calcaterra (DE-390) was an Edsall-class destroyer escort built for the U.S. Navy during World War II. She served in the Atlantic Ocean and the Pacific Ocean and provided destroyer escort protection against submarine and air attack for Navy vessels and convoys. Post-war she was called up again for duty, this time as a radar picket ship.

== Namesake ==
Herbert A. Calcaterra was born on 7 April 1920 in Escalon, California. He enlisted in the Navy on 14 December 1939. Motor Machinist's Mate First Class Calcaterra was commended 7 July 1942 for his performance as a member of the crew of the USS Pompano, and was posthumously awarded the Silver Star for conspicuous gallantry as a member of a 3" gun crew until fatally wounded during an action against an armed enemy patrol ship on 4 September 1942.

== Construction and commissioning ==
She was launched 18 August 1943 by Brown Shipbuilding Co., Houston, Texas; sponsored by Mrs. G. M. Stites; commissioned 17 November 1943 and reported to the Atlantic Fleet.

== World War II North Atlantic operations ==
Assigned to the vital duty of escorting convoys between the United States and the Mediterranean, Calcaterra made eight round trips between 13 February 1944 and 10 June 1945. The ships she guarded provided the men and equipment which insured the success of the invasions of Italy and southern France. Twice the escort vessel met the challenge of enemy opposition when she depth charged a suspected submarine contact and fired on two aircraft. Her alert action helped prevent damage or loss to the ships under convoy.

== Transfer to the Pacific Fleet ==
On 9 July 1945 Calcaterra headed for the Pacific to tackle a new job, but the war ended shortly before her arrival at Pearl Harbor. She lifted passengers back to the west coast, then sailed on to the Atlantic. Calcaterra was placed out of commission in reserve at Green Cove Springs, Florida, on 1 May 1946.

Reclassified DER-390 on 28 October 1954, Calcaterra was converted to a radar picket ship at Norfolk, Virginia, and recommissioned on 12 September 1955. Based on Newport, Rhode Island, the radar picket ship almost continuously served in the violent weather of the North Atlantic once lost all life lines and ready service box's, 5" gun mount was lifted of her gimbals that a crane had to be used to remount it, to maintain her link in the extension of the Distant Early Warning system. Except for exercises with the fleet in the Atlantic and Caribbean, and a cruise to Europe, Calcaterra continued this duty through 1960.

== Final decommissioning ==
Calcaterra was struck from the Navy list on 2 July 1973, sold on 14 May 1974, and broken up for scrap.

The pickets north of Cuba, Dog Rocks, were 30 days out, two days in Key West or Miami, 30 days out then 28 days in Newport, year after year. On many pickets the ship was used as a halfway point for people escaping from Cuba. They were fed then picked up by the Coast Guard. When the ship hit heavy seas headed south for a picket the forward 3-inch gun was ripped off the deck and thrown up onto the 01 level and the forward spaces were flooded. The gun was lashed down, the deck covered with beams and canvas, the water pumped out and the ship proceeded south. About a month later the ship was repaired at a private yard in Boston.

During the years 1965 - 1966 and 1967 - 1968 Calcaterra was assigned to Operation Deep Freeze Task Force 43. Operating out of Dunedin, New Zealand Calcaterra regularly sailed into the Southern Ocean, 60 degrees South, 162 degrees East and performed weather picket duties. Calcaterra circumnavigated the world twice during these deployments.

After the Pueblo incident Calcaterra was refitted as a communications ferret and served in that capacity for several years.
