= USS Sellstrom =

1943 Edsall-class destroyer escort

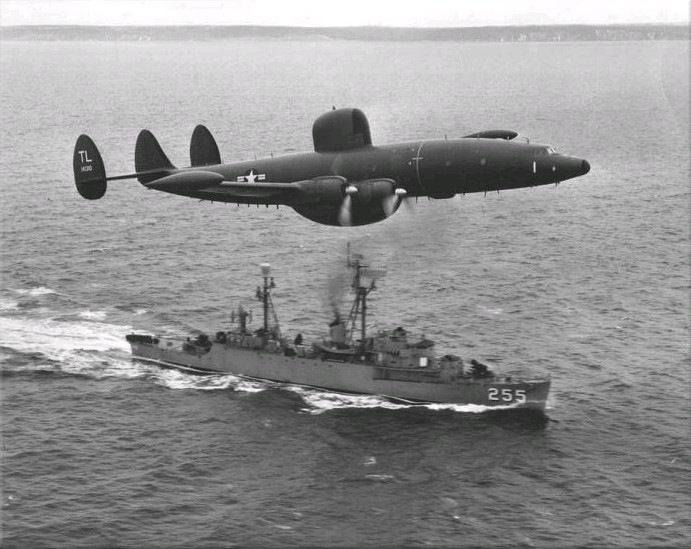
- USS Sellstrom (DER-255) and a Lockheed WV-2 in 1957

History

United States
- Namesake: Edward Robert Sellstrom
- Builder: Brown Shipbuilding Houston, Texas
- Laid down: 16 March 1943
- Launched: 12 May 1943
- Commissioned: 12 October 1943
- Decommissioned: June 1960
- Reclassified: DER-255, 21 October 1955
- Stricken: 1 November 1965
- Fate: Sold for salvage in April 1967

General characteristics
- Class & type: Edsall-class destroyer escort
- Displacement: 1,253 tons standard; 1,590 tons full load
- Length: 306 feet (93.27 m)
- Beam: 36.58 feet (11.15 m)
- Draft: 10.42 full load feet (3.18 m)
- Propulsion: 4 FM diesel engines, 4 diesel-generators, 6,000 shp (4.5 MW), 2 screws
- Speed: 21 knots (39 km/h)
- Range: 9,100 nmi. at 12 knots; (17,000 km at 22 km/h)
- Complement: 8 officers, 201 enlisted
- Armament: 3 × single 3 in (76 mm)/50 guns; 1 × twin 40 mm AA guns; 8 × single 20 mm AA guns; 1 × triple 21 in (533 mm) torpedo tubes; 8 × depth charge projectors; 1 × depth charge projector (hedgehog); 2 × depth charge tracks

USS Sellstrom (DE-255) was an Edsall-class destroyer escort built for the U.S. Navy during World War II. She served in the Atlantic Ocean, the Pacific Ocean and provided destroyer escort protection against submarine and air attack for Navy vessels and convoys.

== Namesake ==
Edward Robert Sellstrom was born on 19 July 1916 in Ottawa, Ontario. He graduated from Gustavus Adolphus College, St. Peter, Minnesota in 1939. He enlisted in the U.S. Naval Reserve (USNR) as Seaman second class at Minneapolis, Minnesota, on 14 January 1941 and was appointed Aviation Cadet at Pensacola, Florida, on 20 March 1941. On 15 September 1941, he was commissioned Ensign, USNR. After duty in the Advanced Carrier Training Group, U.S. Pacific Fleet, he was assigned to Fighter Squadron 3, on board carrier USS Lexington.

On 20 February 1942, he intercepted a Japanese bomber, determinedly pursued it through clouds and rain, and assisted in shooting it down despite heavy machine gun and cannon fire. Later that day, he intercepted and shot down another aircraft during an attack directed at his carrier by nine enemy bombers. As a result of his "skillful marksmanship and courage," he was awarded the Navy Cross. He was killed in an airplane crash on 21 June 1942.

== Construction and commissioning ==
Sellstrom was laid down on 16 March 1943 by the Brown Shipbuilding Company, Houston, Texas; launched on 12 May 1943; sponsored by Miss Genevieve Dahl, fiancé of Ensign Sellstrom; and commissioned on 12 October 1943.

== World War II North Atlantic operations ==
After trial runs and tests, final outfitting, and shakedown, Sellstrom departed Bermuda on 3 December 1943 for the east coast, arriving at Charleston Navy Yard on the 6th. On 13 December, the escort vessel departed Charleston, South Carolina, and proceeded to Norfolk, Virginia, arriving on the 15th.

On 13 January 1944, Sellstrom departed Norfolk as a unit of Task Force 63 bound for Gibraltar. On 31 January, Task Force 63 stood into the Straits of Gibraltar, turned over the escort of their convoy to British control, and set course to Casablanca, French Morocco.

Sellstrom moored at Jetty de Lure, Casablanca Harbor, the next day. She remained in the harbor, doing some patrolling, until 4 February, when she got underway for Gibraltar to pick up another convoy en route to Chesapeake Bay. Sellstrom was relieved of the convoy in Chesapeake Bay on 22 February and proceeded to New York, mooring at the Brooklyn Navy Yard the next day.

== Refresher training Stateside ==
After repairs, alterations, and the loading of ammunition, Sellstrom engaged in refresher training off Montauk, Long Island. On 10 March, Sellstrom departed Long Island and arrived at Norfolk on the 11th. Sellstrom stood out of Chesapeake Bay on 15 March and joined convoy UGS-36 en route to Bizerte, Tunisia.

== Attacked by enemy aircraft ==
At 0400 on 1 April, enemy planes dropped parachute flares prior to attacking Sellstrom's convoy. Evasive maneuvering and a screen of antiaircraft fire, however, kept the five two-engined bombers' score to one burned merchant ship. The convoy arrived at Bizerte two days after the air attack.

On 11 April, Sellstrom joined convoy GUS-36 for the trip back to the United States. As flagship of Escort Division 23, Sellstrom guided the New York section of the convoy into the swept channel on 1 May and patrolled the area until all merchant vessels had pilots on board. On 2 May, Sellstrom anchored in Gravesend Bay to unload ammunition prior to going to the Navy Yard for repairs.

Sellstrom departed New York on 13 May en route to Casco Bay, Maine. After completing refresher training there on 17 May, the escort vessel proceeded to the Naval Mine Depot at Yorktown, Virginia. On 23 May, Sellstrom assumed her patrol station and began escort of convoy UGS-43 bound for Tunisia.

Sellstrom turned over the convoy to British escorts and entered Bizerte Harbor on 12 June. On the 20th, Sellstrom picked up GUS-43, delivering her section at New York on 9 July. She docked at the Boston Navy Yard Annex on 11 July, remaining there until the 23rd. From 24 July to 9 August, Sellstrom engaged in refresher training off the coast of Maine.

After preparations on 10 and 11 August at the Boston Navy Yard, Sellstrom again reported for convoy duty. She successfully escorted sections of convoy TCU-35 into the Clyde and Loch Ewe, Scotland, and into Lough Foyle, Northern Ireland, on 21 and 22 August. The destroyer escort then berthed at Derry from 23 to 26 August. Underway again on the 27th, Sellstrom escorted convoy UCT-35 back to the east coast, arriving on 5 September.

After training off New London, Connecticut, Sellstrom received fuel and provisions while moored off 33d St., Brooklyn Pier. Sellstrom departed New York Harbor on 29 September and resumed convoy duty. The destroyer escort accompanied six more Atlantic convoys, delivering merchantmen to the ports of Belfast, Northern Ireland; Liverpool, Plymouth, Southampton, and Birkenhead, England; and Le Havre, France.

After operating in the Caribbean early in June, she set her course for Charleston, South Carolina, arriving on 17 June 1945.

== Transfer to the Pacific Fleet ==
As the war was over in Europe, Sellstrom, loaded supplies at Charleston in preparation for duty in the Pacific. She departed Charleston on 23 June, transited the Panama Canal between the 27th and the 29th, and arrived at San Francisco, California, on 7 July.

On 11 July, Sellstrom departed San Francisco and proceeded to Alaskan waters, arriving at Adak on the 19th. From 21 to 27 July, she remained at Dutch Harbor for assigned availability. Sellstrom escorted her first Alaskan convoy, a minesweeper and eight LCI's, from Cold Bay at Adak, from 30 July to 1 August. Sellstrom's operations consisted of routine patrols and serving as a guard ship vessel for flights over the northern Japanese island chain.

== Post-War activity ==
From December 1945 through February 1946, Sellstrom operated in the postwar Pacific, visiting such ports as Qingdao, China; Jinsen, Korea; and Pearl Harbor. From 17 to 20 March, the destroyer escort transited the Panama Canal en route to drydocking in Charleston. In April 1946, Sellstrom was placed out of commission, in reserve.

== Conversion to radar picket ship ==
On 1 November 1955, Sellstrom was taken out of the Atlantic Reserve Fleet and was brought to the Brooklyn Navy Yard for overhaul and conversion to a radar picket escort ship. Having been redesignated DER-255, Sellstrom was recommissioned on 1 October 1956 and joined the Atlantic Fleet.

After shakedown training at Guantanamo Bay and post-shakedown overhaul, Sellstrom began carrying out assignments on the radar picket lines and as an ocean weather station. Sellstrom continued her naval service throughout the 1950s, performing her tasks off Newfoundland, along the east coast, and in the Caribbean.

== Final decommissioning ==
Sellstrom was decommissioned in June 1960 at [Orange, Texas]. She was struck from the Navy List on 1 November 1965. In April 1967, she was towed from Philadelphia, Pennsylvania, to the Peck Iron Metal Works at Portsmouth, Virginia, for scrapping.

== Awards ==
Sellstrom earned one battle star for World War II service.
