= USS Mills =

1943 Edsall-class destroyer escort

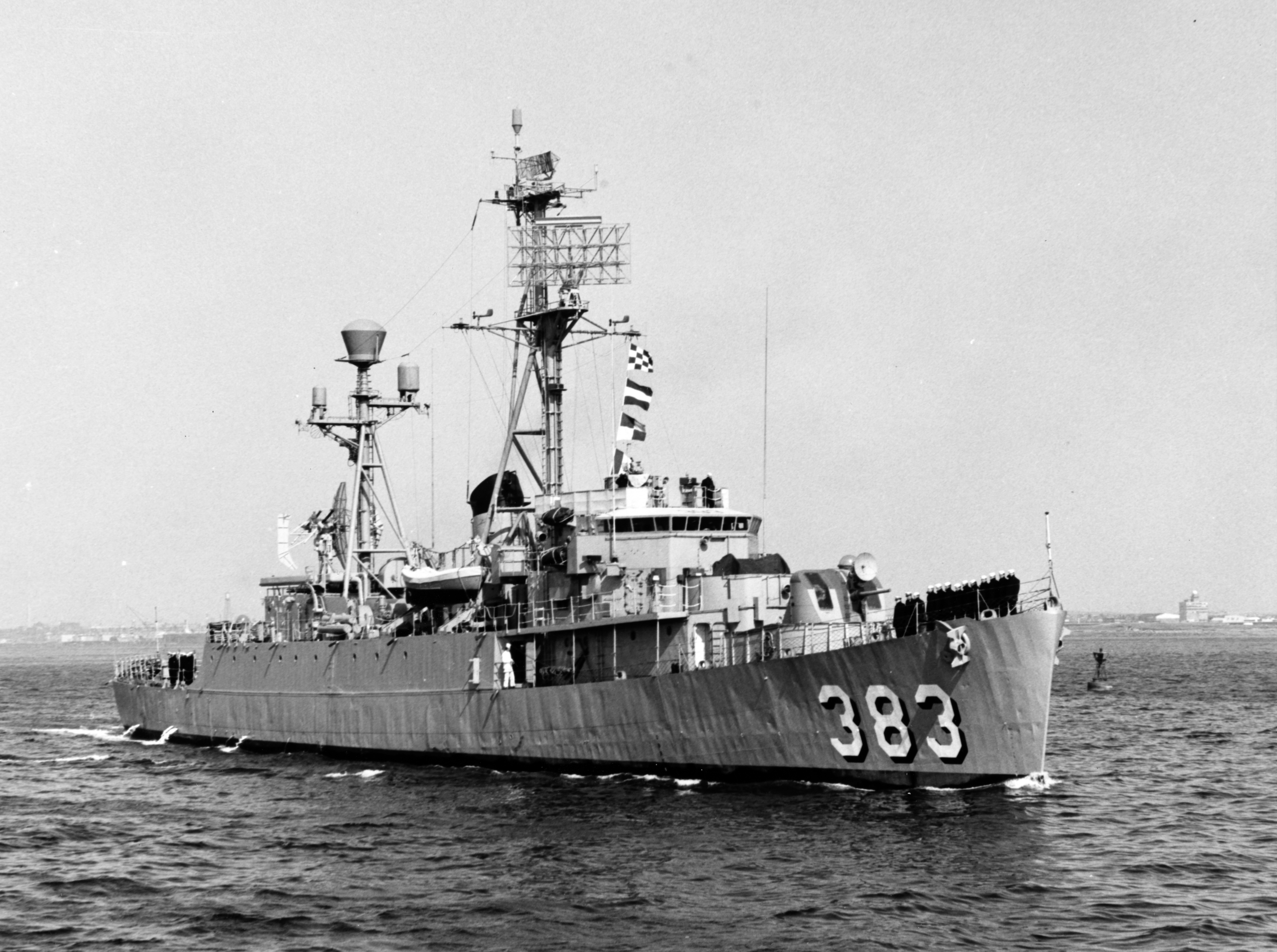
- USS Mills (DER-383), circa 1965

History

United States
- Namesake: Lloyd Jones Mills
- Builder: Brown Shipbuilding, Houston, Texas
- Laid down: 26 March 1943
- Launched: 26 May 1943
- Commissioned: 12 October 1943
- Decommissioned: 27 October 1970
- Reclassified: DER-383, 1 November 1956
- Stricken: 1 August 1974
- Identification: Call sign NJUT
- Fate: Sold for scrapping 12 March 1975
- Notes: Washington Naval District at Baltimore, Maryland, 3 September 1968

General characteristics
- Class & type: Edsall-class destroyer escort
- Displacement: 1,253 tons standard; 1,590 tons full load
- Length: 306 feet (93.27 m)
- Beam: 36.58 feet (11.15 m)
- Draft: 10.42 full load feet (3.18 m)
- Propulsion: 4 FM diesel engines, 4 diesel-generators, 6,000 shp (4.5 MW), 2 screws
- Speed: 21 knots (39 km/h)
- Range: 9,100 nmi. at 12 knots; (17,000 km at 22 km/h)
- Complement: 8 officers, 201 enlisted
- Armament: 3 × single 3 in (76 mm)/50 guns; 1 × twin 40 mm AA guns; 8 × single 20 mm AA guns; 1 × triple 21 in (533 mm) torpedo tubes; 8 × depth charge projectors; 1 × depth charge projector (hedgehog); 2 × depth charge tracks

USS Mills (DE-383) was an Edsall-class destroyer escort built for the U.S. Navy during World War II. She served in the Atlantic Ocean and the Pacific Ocean and provided destroyer escort protection against submarine and air attack for Navy vessels and convoys. Post-war, she performed additional duties for the Navy, including those of a radar picket ship and a safety and support ship for Operation Deep Freeze.

== Namesake ==
Lloyd Jones Mills was born on 3 July 1917, in Rock Springs, Wyoming. He enlisted in the U.S. Naval Reserve as seaman second class on 4 December 1940. He was appointed aviation cadet on 6 March 1941, naval aviator on 22 August 1941 and commissioned Ensign on 19 September 1941. He was killed on 30 July 1942, in an airplane crash during the Aleutian Islands campaign and was posthumously awarded the Distinguished Flying Cross for heroism and extraordinary achievement in action 1–15 June 1942.

== Construction and commissioning ==
She was laid down 26 March 1943 by Brown Shipbuilding Co., Houston, Texas; launched 26 May 1943; sponsored by Mrs. James E. Mills; and commissioned 12 October 1943.

== World War II North Atlantic operations ==
After shakedown out of Bermuda, Mills trained nucleus crews for frigates and destroyer escorts off Norfolk, Virginia, until 10 January 1944 when she began transatlantic convoy escort duty. On her second voyage into the Mediterranean, Mills' convoy was attacked before dawn 1 April 1944, 56 miles west of Algiers by German torpedo bombers. SS Jared Ingersoll, a Liberty ship, was hit and set blazing. Mills picked up survivors who had abandoned ship, and sent a boarding party to extinguish her fires. British tug HMS Mindfull and Mills then towed Jared Ingersoll to Algiers.

== Transferred to the Pacific Ocean ==
By V-E Day, for which she was moored at Brooklyn Navy Yard, Mills had completed nine voyages on escort duty to the Mediterranean, Ireland, the United Kingdom, and France. Mills left New York City 30 May 1945 for the Panama Canal and Adak, Alaska, arriving 8 July. She served there as weather station, plane guard, and escort between Alaskan ports until sailing 20 August for occupation duty, arriving 9 September at Ominato Ko, Honshū.

Briefly returning to Alaska 25 September to 17 November, Mills steamed west again to operate out of Taku and Tianjin, China, until 11 February 1946. Returning to the States via Pearl Harbor and the Panama Canal, she arrived Charleston, South Carolina, 22 March, sailed 25 April for Green Cove Springs, Florida, and decommissioned 14 June to go into reserve.

== Converted to Radar Picket Ship ==
Eleven years later, after installation of additional radar and electronic equipment and enlargement of her superstructure at Boston Naval Shipyard, Mills was reclassified DER-383 and recommissioned 3 October 1957. Assigned as a radar picket of the North American Continental Air Defense System to deter surprise attack by locating and reporting aircraft headed toward North America, Mills sailed 3 April 1958 from Newport, Rhode Island, for Argentia, Newfoundland, to begin her first picket. She made 17 subsequent 3 to 4-week pickets on the barrier stretching from Newfoundland to the Azores through 28 July 1961, as well as one off the southeast coast of the United States.

Between 28 August 1961 and the end of 1963, Mills served primarily on the new Greenland-Iceland-United Kingdom Barrier designed to extend protection to the NATO allies.

== Supporting Operation Deep Freeze ==
In 1964, Mills was assigned to Operation Deep Freeze, the U.S. Naval Force supporting scientific research in Antarctica. During the austral summer seasons of 1964–65, and 1966–67, and 1967–68, Mills took station to provide weather information and electronic navigational aid to aircraft ferrying men and equipment between Christchurch, New Zealand, and McMurdo Station, Antarctica.

Each of these seasonal deployments required an 11,000-mile voyage via the Panama Canal to Dunedin, New Zealand, Mills' base of operations with "Deep Freeze". At the end of each deployment, Mills completed a round the world cruise by returning to Newport, Rhode Island, via the Suez Canal. In 1965, when she did not serve with "Deep Freeze", Mills was underway school ship off Florida. On 3 September 1968, Mills became an operational Naval Reserve training ship at Baltimore, Maryland.

== Awards ==
Mills received one battle star for World War II service.
