= USS Snowden =

1943 Edsall-class destroyer escort

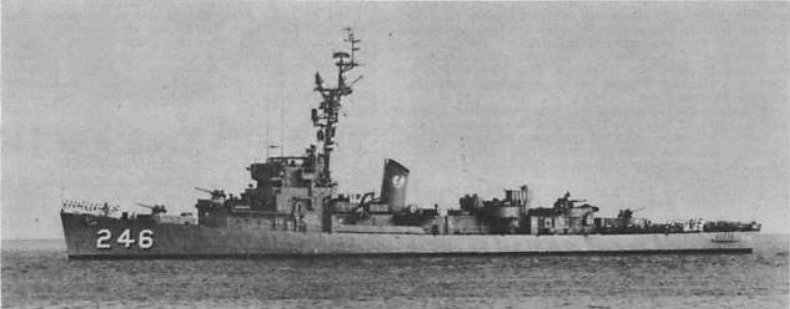

History

United States
- Namesake: Thomas Snowden
- Builder: Brown Shipbuilding Houston, Texas
- Laid down: 7 December 1942
- Launched: 19 February 1943
- Commissioned: 23 August 1943
- Out of service: 23 September 1968
- Stricken: 23 September 1968
- Fate: Sunk as target off Newport, Rhode Island, 27 June 1969

General characteristics
- Class & type: Edsall-class destroyer escort
- Displacement: 1,253 tons standard; 1,590 tons full load
- Length: 306 feet (93.27 m)
- Beam: 36.58 feet (11.15 m)
- Draft: 10.42 full load feet (3.18 m)
- Propulsion: 4 FM diesel engines, 4 diesel-generators, 6,000 shp (4.5 MW), 2 screws
- Speed: 21 knots (39 km/h)
- Range: 9,100 nmi. at 12 knots; (17,000 km at 22 km/h)
- Complement: 8 officers, 201 enlisted
- Armament: 3 × single 3 in (76 mm)/50 guns; 1 × twin 40 mm AA guns; 8 × single 20 mm AA guns; 1 × triple 21 in (533 mm) torpedo tubes; 8 × depth charge projectors; 1 × depth charge projector (hedgehog); 2 × depth charge tracks

USS Snowden (DE-246) was an Edsall-class destroyer escort built for the U.S. Navy during World War II. She served in the Atlantic Ocean the Pacific Ocean and provided destroyer escort protection against submarine and air attack for Navy vessels and convoys.

She was named in honor of Admiral Thomas Snowden (1857-1930) who was awarded the Navy Cross during World War I. She was laid down on 7 December 1942 by Brown Shipbuilding Co., Inc., Houston, Texas; launched on 19 February 1943; sponsored by Mrs. Edith M. Greenlee, wife of Captain Halford R. Greenlee (Retired); and commissioned on 23 August 1943. At war's end, she returned home with three battle stars.

== World War II North Atlantic operations ==
Snowden sailed for New Orleans, Louisiana, on 3 September en route to Bermuda for her shakedown cruise which lasted until 14 October. She was then ordered to Charleston, South Carolina. Late in the month, she escorted USS Almaack (AK-27) to Panama, and, in November, USS Sloat (DE-245) to New York City. The ship was assigned to convoy UGS-24 there, on 11 November, and escorted it to Norfolk, Virginia, and Casablanca, arriving on 1 December. She picked up another convoy there and returned to New York on 24 December 1943.

Snowden got underway for a short training cruise to Norfolk on 5 January 1944 and then escorted USS Arkansas (BB-33) to New York. In January, she escorted convoy UGS-31 to Gibraltar, via Norfolk, and in February returned to New York with convoy UGS-30 which arrived on 8 March. The escort then moved to Norfolk and joined Task Group (TG) 21.15, a hunter-killer group, which sailed on 24 March.

That evening, a sound contact was made by Snowden, but she was ordered out of the area so that aircraft from USS Croatan (CVE-25) could drop sonar buoys, which produced negative results.

== Sinking of German Submarine U-488 ==
On 28 April, Snowden, USS Frost (DE-144), and USS Barber (DE-161) left their screening positions to make fathometer readings at the head of an oil slick. Snowden made a reading at 560 feet. The trio dropped two depth charge patterns of 39 charges each. Two undersea explosions followed as U-488 was destroyed.

== Sinking of German Submarines U-154 and U-490 ==
The task group was forced to return to port for a resupply of depth charges on 5 May before continuing operations in June and July. On 12 June, Snowden, Frost, and USS Inch (DE-146) made a surface radar contact. Inch illuminated the target with star shells, and it was identified as a submarine. Frost commenced firing as Snowden was out of range. An SOS was received by Frost which was followed by a loud explosion from the submarine. The three escorts picked up 60 survivors from the sunken U-490. On 3 July, Frost and Inch destroyed U-154 Snowden put a boat in the water, and it collected such debris as paper with German writing, German cigarettes, and human flesh. The submarine was definitely sunk.

== Sinking of German Submarine U-1235 ==
On 22 August, Snowden joined task group TG 22.5 and operated in the Caribbean until 30 December 1944 when it returned to Norfolk. On 25 March 1945, the task group sailed to the north-central Atlantic to hunt enemy submarines. No contact was made until 15 April. Snowden left the barrier patrol to screen Croatan while USS Stanton (DE-247) and Frost attacked. Six minutes later, both ships were shaken by a violent explosion. At 0114 the next morning, there was an even larger explosion, which shook ships 12 miles away, followed by several minor ones. That was the end of U-1235.

The hunter-killer group entered Argentia, Newfoundland, on 25 April, for three days and then put to sea for two more weeks of hunting. Snowden stopped at the Brooklyn Navy Yard on 14 May for two weeks and then moved down to Norfolk.

== Transfer to the Pacific Fleet ==
Snowden remained at Norfolk until 4 July when she sailed for Pearl Harbor, via Guantánamo Bay, Cuba, Panama, and San Diego, California. The escort was in Pearl Harbor from 14 August until 11 September when she retraced her route to Norfolk for overhaul and inactivation, arriving on 28 September 1945. After the overhaul was completed, she sailed to Green Cove Springs, Florida, and in March 1946, was placed in reserve, out of commission, with the Atlantic Reserve Fleet.

== Post-War Reactivation ==
On 6 June 1951, Snowden was again placed in active service. She held refresher training at Guantanamo Bay in July and August and then conducted exercises out of Newport, Rhode Island, from September 1951 to March 1952. After further refresher training at Guantanamo Bay in June and July, she sailed to the North Atlantic and participated in her first North Atlantic Treaty Organization (NATO) fleet exercise. After calling at ports in Norway and Scotland, she returned to the Caribbean and spent the remainder of the year there.

From 1953 to 1957, Snowden operated with the Atlantic Fleet along the east coast, ranging from Labrador to the Caribbean. She participated in her second NATO exercise from 3 September to 21 October 1957 with port calls in France. The escort resumed her normal east coast operations until February 1960 when she became a Group I, Naval Reserve Training Ship.

== Reassigned as Naval Reserve Training Ship ==
Snowden was decommissioned in August and placed in service as a Group II, Naval Reserve Training Ship and berthed at Philadelphia, Pennsylvania. She was recommissioned on 2 October 1961 and assigned to Key West, Florida. She operated from there until April 1962 when she was ordered to return to Philadelphia where she was again decommissioned and resumed her former status as a Group II, Naval Reserve Training Ship. She remained in this category until 20 August 1968 when she was ordered to prepare for inactivation and striking.

== Final Decommissioning ==
Snowden was struck from the Navy list on 23 September 1968 and sunk as a target on 27 June 1969.

== Awards ==
Snowden received three battle stars for World War II.
