= USS Swasey (DE-248) =

WWII US naval vessel

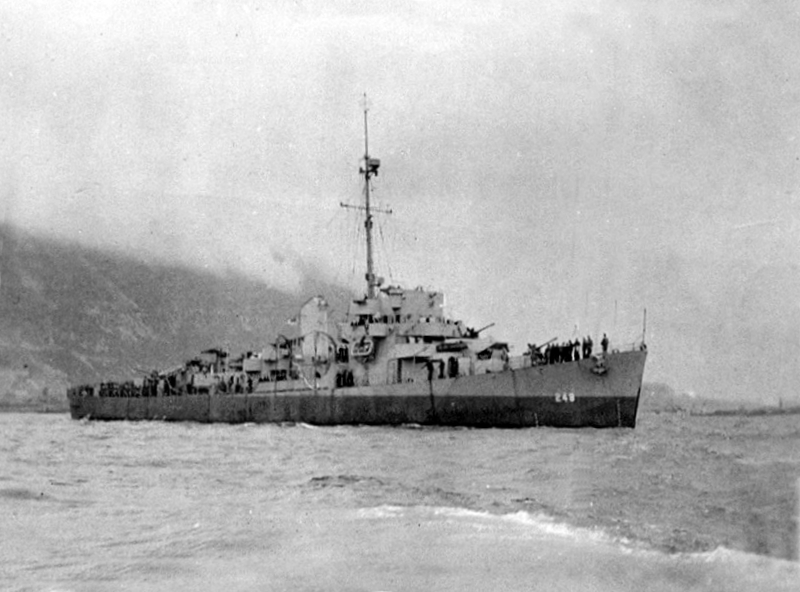

History

United States
- Namesake: Charles Swasey
- Builder: Brown Shipbuilding Houston, Texas
- Laid down: 30 December 1942
- Launched: 18 March 1943
- Commissioned: 31 August 1943
- Decommissioned: 15 March 1946
- Stricken: 1 November 1972
- Fate: Sold for scrapping 30 January 1974

General characteristics
- Class & type: Edsall-class destroyer escort
- Displacement: 1,253 tons standard; 1,590 tons full load
- Length: 306 feet (93.27 m)
- Beam: 36.58 feet (11.15 m)
- Draft: 10.42 full load feet (3.18 m)
- Propulsion: 4 FM diesel engines, 4 diesel-generators, 6,000 shp (4.5 MW), 2 screws
- Speed: 21 knots (39 km/h)
- Range: 9,100 nmi. at 12 knots; (17,000 km at 22 km/h)
- Complement: 8 officers, 201 enlisted
- Armament: 3 × single 3 in (76 mm)/50 guns; 1 × twin 40 mm AA guns; 8 × single 20 mm AA guns; 1 × triple 21 in (533 mm) torpedo tubes; 8 × depth charge projectors; 1 × depth charge projector (hedgehog); 2 × depth charge tracks

USS Swasey (DE-248) was an Edsall-class destroyer escort built for the U.S. Navy during World War II. She served in the Atlantic Ocean the Pacific Ocean and provided destroyer escort protection against submarine and air attack for Navy vessels and convoys.

She was named in honor of Charles Swasey who was wounded during an engagement with Confederate forces near Donaldsonville, Louisiana, on 4 October 1862 and died the same day.

Swasey (DE-248) was laid down on 30 December 1942 by the Brown Shipbuilding Co., Houston, Texas; launched on 18 March 1943; sponsored by Miss Catherine Stokes; and commissioned on 31 August 1943.

== World War II North Atlantic operations ==
Swasey departed for Galveston, Texas, on 4 September and, after provisioning on the 12th, moved to New Orleans, Louisiana, the next day. She stood out of New Orleans on 14 September en route to Bermuda for her shakedown cruise which lasted until 23 October when she put into the Charleston Navy Yard for availability. On 3 November the escort was underway for Norfolk, Virginia, and additional yard work. Two weeks later she made a round trip to New York City and returned on 21 November.

== Sinking of destroyer Turner ==
Swasey was attached to Task Force (TF) 64 to escort convoy UGS-25 to North Africa. The convoy arrived safely on 10 December, and Swasey joined GUS-24 the next week for the return voyage to the United States. After an uneventful crossing, the escort was waiting to enter New York Harbor on 3 January 1944 when an explosion rocked USS Turner 3,000 yards (2,700 m) away. Swasey proceeded at best speed to aid the stricken ship but could not go alongside as small craft were nearing Turner at the time. The motor whaleboat was lowered with a fire and rescue party to board Turner if possible. Swasey managed to close within 20 yards (18 m) of Turner, and all fire hoses were brought to bear on Turner's flames, but the water was ineffective on the roaring inferno. Swasey continued to direct small boats until 0750 when, after a large explosion, Turner capsized and sank.

After an availability period from 4 to 13 January, Swasey held training off Casco Bay, Maine, and sailed for Norfolk on 21 January. She sailed on the 24th for North Africa as an escort of Convoy UGS-31 and arrived at Gibraltar on 13 February. She departed there three days later with GUS-30 and arrived at New York on 8 March. Swasey joined task force TF 65 at Norfolk and sailed on 24 March in the escort screen of convoy UGS-37 en route to Bizerte. The convoy consisted of 60 merchant ships and six LSTs. The crossing was uneventful until the convoy had passed the Straits of Gibraltar and was off the coast of Algeria. In the evening of 11 April, an enemy aircraft was reported in the area.

== Attacked by Luftwaffe aircraft ==
Just before midnight a force of approximately two dozen German Dornier 217s and Junkers 88s attacked the convoy. A smoke screen was laid to cover the convoy; and, as a result, the escorts were attacked. At 2345 hours, Swasey's guns opened fire on a torpedo plane approaching on the port bow. The plane dropped its torpedo which passed down the port side only 15 feet (4.6 m) from the ship. At 2355 the gunners splashed an enemy bomber which passed over the fantail at a height of 50 feet (15 m). At 0004 on 12 April an enemy plane passed from port to starboard, 200 yards (180 m) off the bow. A torpedo track was sighted approaching the bow at 0012. The ship had to maneuver radically to avoid it. No merchant ships of the convoy were damaged in the engagement, but USS Holder was torpedoed on the port side. Bizerte was reached on the 13th. Swasey, with task force TF 65, returned to New York on 11 May with convoy GUS-37.

== Searching for survivors at sea ==
Swasey joined Task Group (TG) 22.5 composed of Croatan and ships of Escort Division 13 at Norfolk and sailed for the North Atlantic on 4 June. The force operated as a "hunter-killer" group in the Atlantic and put into Casablanca on 26 June. The task group sortied from Casablanca on 30 June and, after searching the North Atlantic again, arrived at New York on 22 July. After a short overhaul period there and refresher training at Casco Bay, the destroyer escort proceeded to Norfolk to rejoin TG 22.5. The hunter-killer group departed Norfolk on 21 August for training at Bermuda and then to search for enemy submarines. On 9 September, the group was ordered east of Bermuda to avoid a hurricane. Six days later, Swasey and Frost were ordered to search for survivors of Warrington which was sunk by the storm. At 0940 hours on 15 September, Hyades, which had been standing by Warrington, was sighted. Swasey lowered her whaleboat and began searching for survivors. She rescued two and retrieved the bodies of 30 casualties which were buried at sea. The DE rejoined her group and continued antisubmarine patrols until 20 October when she sailed into New York Harbor for a yard period.

Swasey returned to Norfolk on 11 October and sailed for Bermuda three days later for refresher training. She returned to Norfolk six weeks later and departed for Guantanamo Bay on 26 December for additional training with the "hunter-killer" group. Returning to Norfolk on 30 December, the group moved to Baltimore, Maryland, from 2 to 5 January 1945 for rest and recreation. Swasey and TG 22.5 returned to Bermuda on 10 January for more training and antisubmarine patrols. The patrols were uneventful and the group arrived at New York on 4 February.

== Sinking German Submarines U-1235 and U-880 ==
Swasey and the "hunter-killer" group went to sea again on 25 March to search the central North Atlantic for a reported concentration of German submarines. Various contacts were made but it was not until 15 and 16 April that sure kills were made by units of the task group. Stanton and Frost sank U-1235 on the 15th and U-880 on the morning of the 16th. Swasey joined the search for U-880, but credit went to Stanton and Frost. The ships put into Argentia, Newfoundland, from 25 to 28 April for refueling and provisioning and then continued on patrol. They were operating in the Atlantic when the war in Europe ended. Swasey arrived at New York on 14 May and remained there until the 29th when she departed for Charleston, South Carolina, and an overhaul. During the period in the yard, from 1 June to 1 July, her antiaircraft batteries were doubled in preparation for duty in the Pacific.

== Transfer to the Pacific Fleet ==
Swasey held refresher training at Guantanamo Bay from 4 July to 7 August when she sailed for Panama. Swasey transited the canal on 11 August, and she arrived at San Diego, California, on the 14th. The escort got underway for Hawaii on 26 August and arrived at Pearl Harbor on 2 September. She was ordered to return to the East Coast of the United States and left Hawaii three days later with 100 passengers to be returned to San Diego. Swasey arrived at San Diego on 11 September and departed the next day for Norfolk, Virginia, via the Panama Canal.

== Post-War deactivation and decommissioning ==
When the ship arrived at Norfolk on the 28th, she received orders to be inactivated. Swasey spent a month in the yard there in preparation for decommissioning and then sailed to Green Cove Springs, Florida. She arrived there on 27 October and was attached to the Atlantic Reserve Fleet in a caretaker status. Swasey was decommissioned on 15 January 1946 and remained with the Reserve Fleet until 1 November 1972 when she was struck from the Navy List and scrapped on 30 January 1974.

== Awards ==
Swasey received one battle star for World War II.
