= USS Barber =

Buckley-class destroyer escort

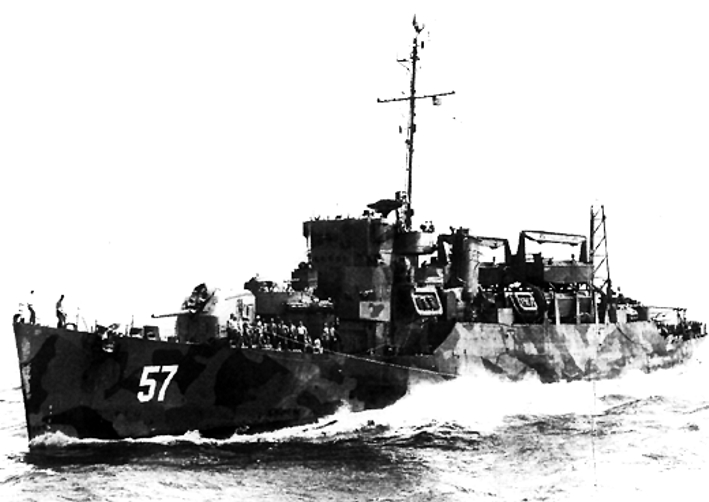

History

United States
- Name: USS Barber (DE-161)
- Namesake: Malcolm, Randolph, & Leroy Barber
- Ordered: 1942
- Builder: Norfolk Navy Yard, Portsmouth, Virginia
- Laid down: 27 April 1943
- Launched: 30 May 1943
- Christened: 10 October 1943
- Sponsored by: Mrs. Peter Thomas Barber
- Commissioned: 10 October 1943
- Refit: October 1944 – January 1945, Philadelphia Navy Yard
- Reclassified: APD-57, 23 October 1944
- Decommissioned: 22 March 1946
- Honors and awards: 3 battle stars, World War II
- Stricken: 27 November 1968
- Fate: transferred to Mexican Navy, 17 February 1969

History

Mexico
- Name: ARM Coahuila (B07)
- Namesake: Coahuila
- Acquired: 17 February 1969
- Renamed: ARM Vincente Guerrero, 1994
- Namesake: Vicente Guerrero
- Renamed: ARM Coahuila (E21)

History
- Stricken: 16 July 2001
- Fate: unknown

General characteristics
- Class & type: Buckley-class destroyer escort, as built
- Class & type: Charles Lawrence-class transport, after October 1944
- Displacement: 1,400 long tons (1,422 t) light; 1,740 long tons (1,768 t) standard
- Length: 306 ft (93 m)
- Beam: 37 ft (11 m)
- Draft: 9 ft 6 in (2.90 m) standard; 11 ft 3 in (3.43 m) full load
- Propulsion: 2 × boilers; General Electric turbo-electric drive; 12,000 shp (8.9 MW); 2 × solid manganese-bronze 3,600 lb (1,600 kg) 3-bladed propellers, 8 ft 6 in (2.59 m) diameter, 7 ft 7 in (2.31 m) pitch; 2 × rudders; 359 tons fuel oil
- Speed: 23 knots (43 km/h; 26 mph)
- Range: 3,700 nmi (6,900 km) at 15 kn (28 km/h; 17 mph); 6,000 nmi (11,000 km) at 12 kn (22 km/h; 14 mph)
- Complement: 15 officers, 198 men
- Armament: 3 × 3-inch/50-caliber guns; 1 × quad 1.1-inch/75-caliber gun; 8 × single 20 mm guns; 1 × triple 21 inch (533 mm) torpedo tubes; 1 × Hedgehog anti-submarine mortar; 8 × K-gun depth charge projectors; 2 × depth charge tracks

USS Barber (DE-161/APD-57) was a Buckley-class destroyer escort in service with the United States Navy from 1943 to 1946. In 1969, she was sold to Mexico where she served until 2001.

== History ==
Barber was named in honor of brothers Malcolm, Randolph, and Leroy Barber who were all killed aboard the USS Oklahoma during the attack on Pearl Harbor on 7 December 1941. The ship was laid down in April 1943 and launched one month later, but because the Barber brothers' mother was not available on the day of launching, the ship was christened at the same time that she was commissioned in October 1943.

=== U.S. Navy (1943-1969) ===
Barber (DE-161) was laid down on 27 April 1943 at Portsmouth, Virginia, by the Norfolk Navy Yard and was launched on 24 May 1943. However, because the sponsor, Mrs. Peter Thomas Barber, the mother of the Barber brothers, could not be present at the launching of the ship, Barber's christening was delayed until the day of her commissioning, 10 October 1943, when the two ceremonies were held simultaneously. Mrs. Barber christened the ship, and USS Barber was placed in commission.

==== Battle of the Atlantic ====
Following shakedown training off Bermuda, the destroyer escort was assigned convoy duty along the Atlantic coast. She escorted troopships to Panama as her first duty and, on her return trip northward, escorted the crippled New Zealand light cruiser HMNZS Leander to Boston. Although they arrived in Boston on 23 December, Barber could not spend Christmas in port. Instead, she pulled out of the harbor on Christmas Day and headed for North Africa escorting a convoy of 95 merchantmen. She arrived in Casablanca, French Morocco, after an uneventful transatlantic crossing. While waiting for a return convoy, she patrolled the Strait of Gibraltar for several days in search of German submarines. After another uneventful voyage, the ship left the convoy at Norfolk and continued on to the New York Navy Yard.

She spent most of February and March 1944 performing escort duties between New York and Norfolk; and, then, on 24 March, received orders to join an anti-submarine "hunter killer" group TG 21.15, built around Croatan (CVE-25) and joined by four other destroyer escorts.

Formed to hunt German U-boats, the group recorded its first success on 26 April when Barber and the escorts Frost (DE-144), Huse (DE-145), and Snowden (DE-246), teamed up to sink the U-488 at 17°54′N 38°05′W. Relieved by another hunter killer group, Barber's unit headed for home on 11 May. After a brief availability at the New York Navy Yard and two weeks of maneuvers at Casco Bay, Maine, Barber resumed her convoy escort duties. She made two more transatlantic voyages to North Africa before October 1944 but did not encounter any enemy ships.

On 9 October, Barber entered the Philadelphia Navy Yard for conversion to a Charles Lawrence-class high speed transport. Although she was reclassified APD-57 on 23 October, she did not complete the preparations for her new role until January 1945. On the 17th, she left Philadelphia and proceeded to Norfolk's convoy escort piers. For a month, the fast transport served as "school ship" for crews of APD's not yet commissioned. Each day she got underway to train these crews in evolutions such as fueling, gunfire, target tracking, and other combat procedures.

==== Pacific War ====
On George Washington's Birthday, the warship steamed out of Norfolk bound for the Pacific and her first combat duty as a high speed transport. After a short stay in San Diego, she continued on westward and arrived at Pearl Harbor on 26 March. The fast transport then conducted specialized training at Maui with Underwater Demolition Teams (UDT's). The mission of such teams was to destroy obstacles on landing beaches, and APD's such as Barber delivered these teams to the areas four or five days before the actual invasion. Just two days after receiving word of President Franklin D. Roosevelt's 12 April death, she sailed via Eniwetok for Ulithi.

Barber arrived there on 30 April and spent five days preparing for front line duty at Okinawa. She departed the safety of Ulithi with a merchant convoy on 5 May and continually felt the presence of the enemy through possible submarine contacts, floating mines, and radio message traffic emanating from Okinawa. The high-speed transport anchored in Hagushi Anchorage on 10 May and, throughout the daylight hours, heard not a sound from the Japanese. However, with sunset, the Japanese air attacks began in earnest.

On 11 May, Barber received orders to assist Hugh W. Hadley (DD-774) on a radar picket station north of the anchorage. That destroyer had been hit by two kamikaze planes and two bombs. Barber mustered all the hands she could spare to help evacuate the injured from Hugh W. Hadley and then to work on saving the damaged warship. The fast transport assumed picket duty north of Ie Shima on the 12th. The enemy never came close by air; but, on 15 May, Barber picked up four Japanese soldiers in a raft and later transferred them to an Army boat for internment in an Okinawa camp.

Barber's good luck continued to hold. Every picket station on which she served had been the scene of a casualty either immediately before her duty there or would become one soon after she departed. On 20 May, the Japanese directed a massive force of midget submarines, mines and kamikaze aircraft at the Allied naval forces. Barber pursued two midget submarines and evaluated one as a "probable kill." The high speed transport continued on patrol, enduring nightly general quarters alarms for Japanese air raids. On 14 June, she captured three more prisoners. On the evening of 16 June, while Barber stood rescue-ship watch at anchor off Hagushi, Twiggs (DD-591) suffered a hit by air raiders and sank within an hour. Barber rushed to the area immediately to search for survivors. The fast transport worked through the night assisting in the rescue of the 188 sailors who survived before returning to the anchorage early the next morning.

Released from duty at Okinawa on Independence Day 1945, Barber joined a convoy of four other escorts and 32 LSTs headed for Saipan. One day out of Saipan, Barber received orders to accompany a part of the convoy to Guam. Her new course took her across the routes used by American B-29 bombers headed for the Japanese mainland. On 9 July, the fast transport received word of a nearby crash of a returning bomber. Barber raced to the site and, despite fears of complete destruction, over the distance of approximately 20 miles the "Barber" following the path of the bomber back toward Japan began to retrieve the crew picking up the captain first, since he was the last one to jump from the plane. In the end, all 11 members of the bomber's crew were remarkably rescued. The fast transport took them to Guam the next day.

Barber remained at Guam until 21 July when she sailed for Ulithi escorting escort carrier Salamaua (CVE-96). She continued on to Leyte Gulf where she screened battleships Texas (BB-35) and Mississippi (BB-41) on 8, 9 and 10 August and then returned to Leyte to await further orders. While there, the news of Japan's capitulation reached Barber and she headed for Okinawa escorting Mississippi and her sistership Idaho (BB-42). Arriving on 21 August, she departed the next day for a brief visit to Manila Bay. On 2 September, the fast transport commenced three weeks of duty in Subic Bay, at the conclusion of which she moved to Lingayen Gulf to join Transport Division (TransDiv) 20. From there, she led a procession of 20 transports for occupation duty. The group entered Wakanoura Bay at Honshū on 7 October and passed three slow weeks while minesweepers cleared a channel to Nagoya. Finally, TransDiv 20 was able to enter the channel safely while Barber remained behind to control the harbor entrance. The crew of the "Barber" went ashore in the city of Nagasaki, which had been destroyed by the second atomic bomb making each member of the crew an "atomic" veteran.

After another three weeks of screening incoming and outgoing ships, the transport received orders to load passengers to capacity and return home. On 21 November, she embarked on the long voyage home. After steaming via Sasebo, Eniwetok, Pearl Harbor, San Diego, and Panama, Barber returned to the east coast for pre-inactivation overhaul, and was decommissioned on 22 May 1946. Barber received three battle stars for her World War II service.

She was berthed with the reserve fleet at Green Cove Springs, Florida, and remained there for more than two decades. Her name was struck from the Naval Vessel Register on 27 November 1968.

== Mexican Navy career ==
On 22 December 1969, she was sold to the Mexican Navy and was commissioned the following February as ARM Coahuila (B07). In 1994, she was renamed ARM Vincente Guerrero, In 1994, she was renamed ARM Vincente Guerrero after former Mexican president Vicente Guerrero. The ship was later restored to her original Mexican name of Coahuila with a new pennant number of E21, before she was stricken from the rolls of the Mexican Navy in July 2001. Her ultimate fate is unreported in secondary sources.
