= USS Croatan (CVE-25) =

Escort aircraft carrier (warship)

- USS Croatan anchored in the Hudson River, off New York City c. late October 1945

History

United States
- Name: USS Croatan
- Namesake: Croatan Sound in North Carolina
- Builder: Seattle-Tacoma Shipbuilding Corporation
- Laid down: 15 April 1942
- Launched: 1 August 1942
- Commissioned: 28 April 1943
- Decommissioned: 20 May 1946
- Identification: CVE-25
- Fate: Sold for scrap, 1971

General characteristics
- Class & type: Bogue-class escort carrier
- Displacement: 9,800 tons
- Length: 495 ft 8 in (151.08 m)
- Beam: 69 ft 6 in (21.18 m)
- Draft: 26 ft (7.9 m)
- Speed: 17 knots (31.5 km/h)
- Complement: 890 officers and men
- Armament: 2 × 4"/50, 5"/38 or 5"/51 guns
- Aircraft carried: 24

USS Croatan (CVE-25) (previously AVG-25 then ACV-25) was a Bogue-class escort carrier launched on 1 August 1942 by the Seattle-Tacoma Shipbuilding Corporation of Seattle, Washington, under a Maritime Commission contract; sponsored by Mrs. J. S. Russell; and commissioned on 28 April 1943.

== Service history ==
Croatan sailed from San Diego, California on 2 July 1943, and arrived at Norfolk, Virginia on 19 July. As the nucleus for a hunter-killer group, she sailed on 5 August for antisubmarine operations in the Atlantic covering the movement of convoys. Her aircraft had two skirmishes with surfaced submarines, and on 5 September initiated night flying operations from escort carriers. She returned to Norfolk on 22 September.

From 17 October to 29 December 1943, Croatan made two voyages to Casablanca ferrying aircraft and aircrew for the North African operations. After another antisubmarine patrol from 14 January to 27 February 1944, she took part in tests with the Naval Research Laboratory at Annapolis, Maryland. From 24 March to 11 May, Croatan made a most successful patrol. On 7 April, her aircraft found the German submarine U-856, which was sunk by her escorts Champlin and Huse at 40°18′N 62°22′W. On the night of 25–26 April, her four escorts joined in sinking U-488 at 17°54′N 38°05′W. She was also successful in her patrol from 2 June to 22 July. On 10 June, Croatan's planes and escorts Frost, Huse, and Inch attacked U-490 and remained in constant contact with it, forcing it to surface the next day. Sixty survivors, including the commanding officer, were rescued before the submarine sank from scuttling charges at 42°47′N 40°08′W. Aircraft and escorts Frost and Inch combined again to sink U-154 on 3 July, at 34°00′N 19°30′W.

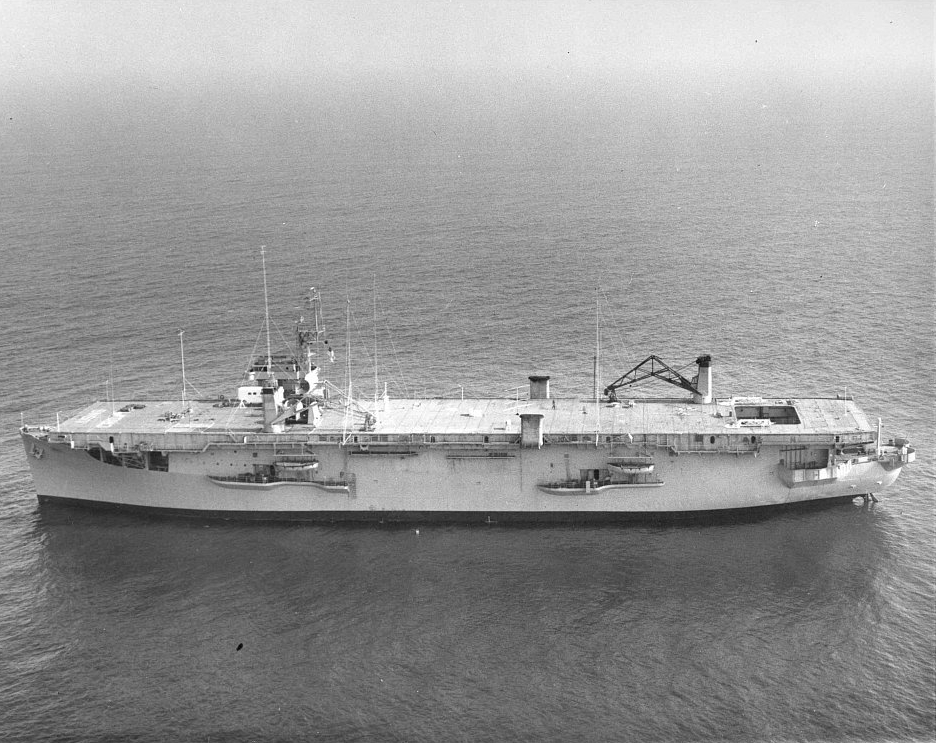
Croatan in 1964

Following a brief overhaul and radar tests with the Naval Research Laboratory, Croatan put to sea again on 20 August 1944. On 15 September, she aided survivors from the destroyer Warrington which had foundered in a hurricane. Returning to Norfolk on 1 October, Croatan next sailed for antisubmarine training at Guantanamo Bay Naval Base and Bermuda, then proceeded to provide air cover for a high-speed east bound task force, returning to New York on 4 February 1945. For the next month, she qualified pilots in carrier operations, then sailed from Norfolk on 25 March to join a barrier line to intercept German submarines as part of Operation Teardrop. On 16 April, her escorts, Frost and Stanton sank U-880 and U-1235 at 47°53′N 30°26′W. Croatan returned by way of Naval Station Argentia, Newfoundland to New York City on 14 May for overhaul.

From 15 September to 3 November, Croatan qualified aviators at Quonset Point, then cleared Norfolk on 23 November on the first of two transatlantic voyages to bring troops home from Le Havre, France.

Croatan was placed out of commission in reserve at Norfolk on 20 May 1946.

== USNS Croatan ==
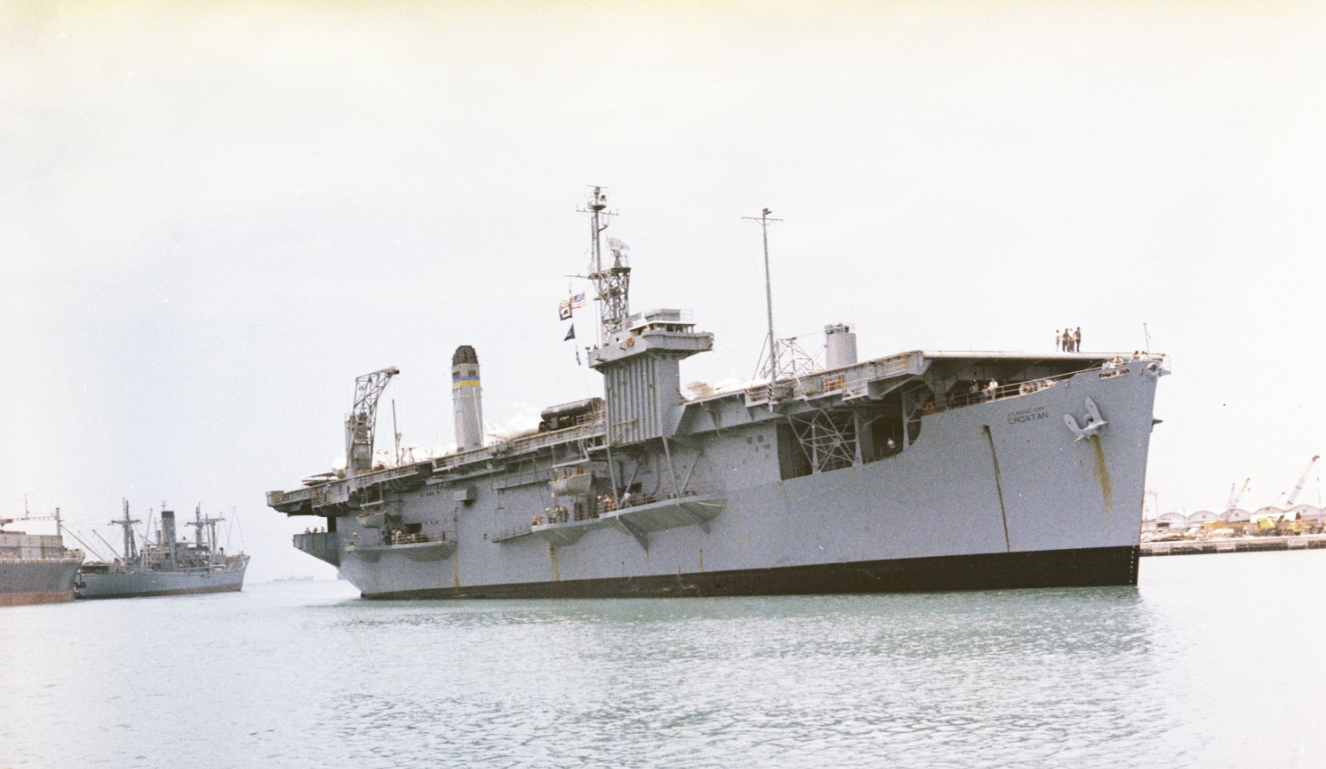
USNS Croatan (T-AKV 43) aviation transport, Okinawa, Japan May 1967

Reactivated, Croatan was assigned to the Military Sea Transportation Service in a noncommissioned status on 16 June 1958, crewed by civilians. In August 1963, she carried 23 F-104 Starfighters delivered to the Royal Norwegian Air Force 331 Squadron at Bodø, Norway. In March 1964 she carried also F-104 Starfighter and delivered to the Royal Hellenic Air Force. In October 1964, she served as an experimental ship under NASA control until May 1965. In August 1965, she helped transport helicopters for the US Army's 1st Cavalry Division (Airmobile) to Vietnam. She was stricken for disposal on 15 September 1970 and sold for scrap in 1971.
