= USS Warrington (DD-383) =

Somers-class destroyer

Coordinates: 24.990°N 77.156°W

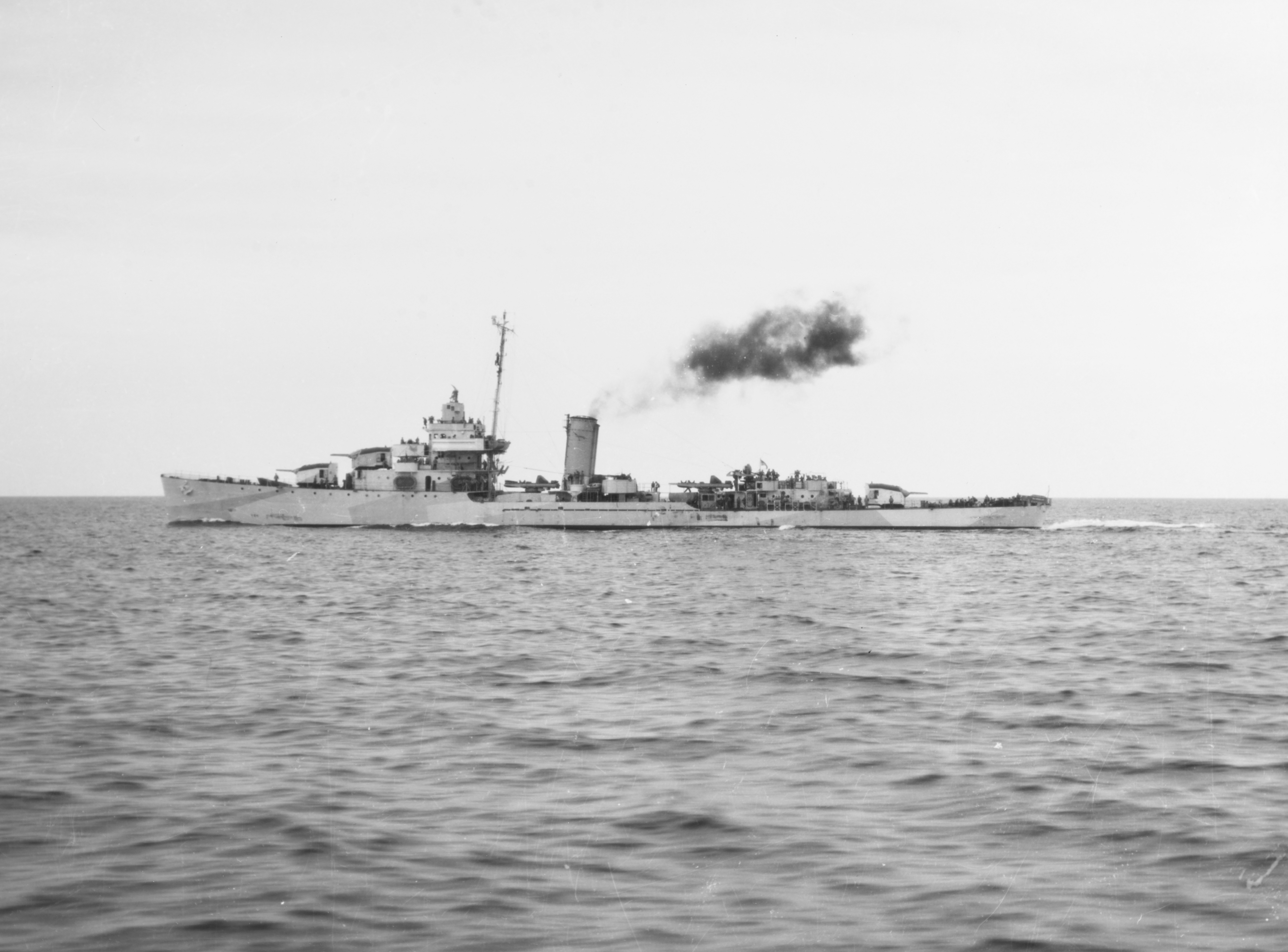
- USS Warrington, 23 April 1943

History

United States
- Name: USS Warrington
- Namesake: Lewis Warrington
- Builder: Federal Shipbuilding and Drydock Company
- Laid down: 10 October 1935
- Launched: 15 May 1937
- Commissioned: 9 February 1938
- Stricken: 23 September 1944
- Fate: Sank in a hurricane off the Bahamas on 13 September 1944

General characteristics
- Class & type: Somers-class destroyer
- Displacement: 1,850 long tons (1,880 t) (standard); 2,905 long tons (2,952 t) (full)
- Length: 381 ft (116 m)
- Beam: 36 ft 11 in (11.25 m)
- Draft: 14 ft (4.3 m)
- Installed power: 52,000 shp (39,000 kW)
- Propulsion: 2 × geared turbines; 2 × shafts
- Speed: 39 kn (45 mph; 72 km/h)
- Range: 7,500 nmi (8,600 mi; 13,900 km) at 12 kn (14 mph; 22 km/h)
- Complement: 294
- Armament: 8 × 5 in (130 mm)/38 cal dual-purpose guns; 8 × 1.1 in (28 mm) anti-aircraft guns; 2 × .50 in (13 mm) machine guns; 12 × 21 inch (533 mm) torpedo tubes

USS Warrington (DD-383) was a Somers-class destroyer, laid down on 10 October 1935 at Kearny, New Jersey, by the Federal Shipbuilding and Drydock Company; launched on 15 May 1937; sponsored by Miss Katherine Taft Chubb; and commissioned at the New York Navy Yard on 9 February 1938.

She was the second ship of the United States Navy to be named for Lewis Warrington, an officer in the Navy during the Barbary Wars and the War of 1812. He also temporarily served as the Secretary of the Navy.

After several years of service in the Pacific theater during World War II, Warrington was sunk by the 1944 Great Atlantic hurricane off the Bahamas on 13 September 1944.

== Inter-war period ==
Warrington did her shakedown cruise to the West Indies in April–May, and returned to New York City on 24 May. She then underwent post-shakedown availability, and conducted tactical training off Cape Cod and the Virginia Capes. She also participated in maneuvers with the boats of Submarine Division 4 (SubDiv 4) in waters near New London. In October, she headed south for refresher training in Cuban waters.

On 4 December, the warship headed north to Newport, Rhode Island, where she became a unit of DesDiv 17, DesRon 9. Warrington operated along the East Coast and made a cruise to the Caribbean in a task group built around the aircraft carriers Enterprise and Yorktown to participate in Fleet Problem XX.

In mid-February 1939, she reported to Key West to serve as an escort for Houston, the cruiser in which president Franklin D. Roosevelt and Chief of Naval Operations Admiral William D. Leahy embarked to observe the concluding phase of the 1939 annual Fleet exercise. The destroyer concluded that assignment upon her arrival at Charleston, South Carolina, on 3 March where Roosevelt and Leahy left Houston to return to Washington. After three months of operations along the coast between New York and Norfolk, Virginia, the destroyer moored at Fort Hancock, New Jersey, on the morning of 9 June to embark King George VI and Elizabeth Queen of Great Britain for passage to Manhattan.

Warrington departed Norfolk on 26 June, transited the Panama Canal on 3 July and arrived in her new home port, San Diego, soon thereafter. Assigned to the Battle Force, United States Fleet, the destroyer conducted operations along the California coast for the next nine months. At the beginning of April 1940, she departed San Diego with the ships of Battle Force to participate in Fleet Problem XXI, conducted in Hawaiian waters. Though nominally retaining San Diego as her home port, Warrington was based at Pearl Harbor for most of her remaining peacetime service. From April 1940 to April 1941, she returned to the West Coast only twice: once in June 1940 for repairs after the conclusion of the Fleet exercise and again in late November and early December of that year.

After 12 months of training out of Pearl Harbor, frequently with submarines engaged in torpedo practice, Warrington departed Hawaii on 18 April 1941 to augment the forces engaged in the so-called "Neutrality Patrol". After passing back through the Panama Canal on 7 May, she continued on to Guantanamo Bay, Cuba. There, she became part of a patrol force composed of the cruisers Cincinnati, Memphis, and destroyer Davis. Her area of operations encompassed the eastern Caribbean and the western Atlantic from the West Indies south to about 12° south latitude. In addition to patrolling, she later began intermittent escort duties; and, in fact, her last assignment during the "Neutrality Patrol" period consisted of a voyage in company with the cruiser Milwaukee to escort SS Acadia from Recife, Brazil, to Puerto Rico. She arrived at San Juan on 3 November; then headed north for a two-day visit at Norfolk; and entered the Charleston Navy Yard on the 9th for repairs.

== World War II ==
She was moored at Charleston on 7 December when the news arrived that the Japanese had attacked Pearl Harbor. Warrington put to sea the following day to conduct war patrols along the Atlantic coast from Norfolk to Newport. Late in December, she rendezvoused with HMS Duke of York and escorted the British battleship into Norfolk on the 21st. For another three weeks, the destroyer patrolled the eastern seaboard as far north as the Massachusetts coast and then headed south on her way to a new area of operations. On 17 January 1942, the warship arrived in Balboa at the Pacific terminus of the Panama Canal where she reported for duty with the Southeast Pacific Force.

Based at Balboa, she operated with the other ships of the Southeast Pacific Force, three cruisers and another destroyer, for the next 16 months. She had two primary missions to perform: escorting merchant, supply, and troop ships between Panama and the Society Islands and patrolling for submarines in the southeastern Pacific as far south as Callao, Peru. Secondary assignments included duty as target and training ship for submarines preparing to enter the war zone and for Army patrol bombers getting ready to do the same. After the Guadalcanal landings on 7 August, her runs to the Society Islands took on new meaning because the bulk of the ships she escorted after that date carried supplies and reinforcements to support America's first offensive in the Pacific.

On 10–11 December, she had the honor of escorting the battleship South Dakota, heavily damaged in the Naval Battle of Guadalcanal in mid-November, into Balboa on her way to repairs at New York. She continued her patrol and escort duties with the Southeast Pacific Force until early June 1943. On 23 May, she stood out of Balboa on her last mission with that organization, to escort a convoy to the Society Islands. Upon arrival at Bora Bora on 4 June, she received orders to report for duty to the Commander in Chief, Pacific Fleet.

=== Southwest Pacific ===
At that juncture, the southwestern Pacific became Warrington's area of operations. Upon reaching Nouméa, New Caledonia, she began a five-week stretch of convoy duty that took her to such diverse places as Australia, Samoa, Hawaii, Guadalcanal, and the New Hebrides Islands. On 1 October, she departed Espiritu Santo in the last-named island group to escort Prince William to Samoa, whence the destroyer headed to Pearl Harbor for repairs and to pick up a convoy.

Warrington returned to Espiritu Santo on 30 October but by 6 November had arrived off Koli Point, Guadalcanal, where she joined up with the second echelon of the Bougainville invasion force. At daybreak two days later, she escorted the troop ships charged to her protection into Empress Augusta Bay, Bougainville. She patrolled to seaward while the transports landed reinforcements and supplies on the beaches to the east and southeast of Cape Torokina.

Near noon, the air raid warning sounded. Both troop and cargo ships got underway to evade the action; and Warrington joined the antiaircraft defenses for the anchorage and beachhead. At four minutes after noon, the destroyer opened fire on two Japanese planes crossing her stern. The first began smoking almost immediately and crashed dead astern. The second came under fire from the other ships as well; shuddered under the impact of the combined fire of the ships and then, trailing pieces from his fuselage, splashed down, too. Warrington claimed sole credit for downing the first plane and a part in getting the second. The enemy withdrew at about 12:25; and, six minutes later, the transports resumed their tasks at Cape Torokina. That night, she escorted the empty transports back to Guadalcanal.

For the next month, Warrington made escort runs between Guadalcanal and Espiritu Santo. On 14 March, she became a part of the antisubmarine screen for an escort carrier task group operating in support of Task Force 37 (TF 37) which, in turn, was striking at Kavieng, a large Japanese base located on the northwestern tip of New Ireland. Later that month, she escorted the third convoy of troopships to Emirau Island, arriving there on the 28th. On 6 April, the destroyer returned to the New Hebrides, stopping briefly at Espiritu Santo before continuing on to Efate where she discharged passengers. On 9 April, she reentered the port at Espiritu Santo for an 11-day availability.

=== New Guinea ===
On 20 April, she rejoined TF 37 at Efate and, four days later, headed south to Sydney, Australia, where she arrived on 29 April. After a week in the Australian port, Warrington headed back to Efate with TF 37, entering Havannah Harbor on 10 May.

There, she and the destroyer Balch were detached from the task force and ordered to New Guinea. The two destroyers reached Milne Bay on 13 May and reported for duty with the 7th Fleet. Two days later, Warrington stood out of Milne Bay bound for Capes Sudest and Cretin. At the latter place, she joined the antisubmarine screen of a Hollandia-bound convoy of LST's. She escorted her charges into Humboldt Bay on 22 May and remained there for three days. She and Balch got underway together again on the 25th to conduct a shore bombardment mission at Wakde Island in support of the advancing troops of the 6th Army.

She began her first mission early on 26 May. Dense foliage precluded the identification of specific targets, so Warrington contented herself with an area bombardment, firing more or less uniformly throughout the designated sector. On 27 May, she and Balch returned for a repeat performance, at the conclusion of which they received a message from the general commanding ashore lauding their ". . . superb cooperation . . ." and indicating that their gunfire had been ". . . of great assistance . . ." to the troops ashore. That same day, the two destroyers headed back to Humboldt Bay.

The return to Hollandia, however, proved brief. Warrington entered the bay on 28 May but departed again late that afternoon to escort an echelon of LST's to a convoy rendezvous point. Upon her arrival, she joined the convoy's antisubmarine screen and set course to escort it to Biak Island. The convoy reached Biak at 07:25 on 30 May, and Warrington received orders instructing her to report to shore fire control group no. 1 to deliver call-fire in support of American ground forces advancing toward Mokmer airstrip. About an hour later, she received instructions from the commanding general ashore to patrol west of the beachhead to keep the Japanese from moving reinforcements in from that direction. After a singularly uneventful morning and afternoon, the destroyer quit her patrols and assumed responsibility as fighter director ship when Swanson left the unit that night.

The following day, she retired from Biak with TG 77.8 and arrived back at Humboldt Bay the same day. From 3–5 June, she made another voyage to Biak during which she provided gunfire support briefly on the 5th before departing to escort the empty LST's back to Humboldt Bay.

Following a voyage that took her to Manus in the Admiralties and back to Espiritu Santo in the New Hebrides, Warrington departed the latter port on 19 June in company with Balch to return to the United States. Steaming via Bora Bora, the two destroyers transited the Panama Canal on 8 July, stopped briefly at Colón, and arrived in New York on the 15th. She immediately entered the New York Navy Yard and began repairs.

She completed her yard period at New York early in August, conducted maneuvers at Casco Bay, Maine, and then entered the Norfolk Navy Yard for additional alterations. On 10 September, she departed Norfolk in company with the stores ship Hyades and set her course for Trinidad.

=== Last days ===
Two days out of Norfolk, along the Florida coast, the two ships encountered heavy weather. In the afternoon, Warrington received word that she was steaming directly into a hurricane. Later that evening, the storm forced the destroyer to heave to while Hyades continued on her way alone. Keeping wind and sea on her port bow, Warrington rode relatively well through most of the night. Wind and seas, however, continued to build during the early morning hours of 13 September. Warrington began to lose headway and, as a result, started to ship water through the vents to her engineering spaces.

The water rushing into her vents caused a loss of electrical power which set off a chain reaction. Her main engines lost power, and her steering engine and mechanism went out. She wallowed there in the trough of the swells, continuing to ship water. She regained headway briefly and turned upwind, while her radiomen desperately, but fruitlessly, tried to raise Hyades. Finally, she resorted to a plain-language distress call to any ship or shore station. By noon on 13 September, it was apparent that Warrington's crewmen could not win the struggle to save their ship, and the order went out to prepare to abandon ship. By 12:50, her crew had left Warrington; and she went down almost immediately. A prolonged search by Hyades, Frost, Huse, Inch, Snowden, Swasey, Woodson, Johnnie Hutchins, ATR-9, and ATR-62 rescued only 5 officers and 68 men of the destroyer's 20 officers and 301 men. Warrington's name was struck from the Naval Vessel Register on 23 September 1944.

== Awards ==
Warrington earned two battle stars during World War II.
