= Holloway Halstead Frost =

Holloway Halstead Frost (April 11, 1889 - January 26, 1935), born in Brooklyn, New York, was an American World War I Navy officer and Navy Cross recipient.

== Naval career ==
Frost was a member of the U.S. Naval Academy class of 1910. A widely published author, his work ranged the gamut of naval subjects, from history to operational analysis to ship-handling. His naval career was as distinguished as his literary; he not only was a designated naval aviator, but was also qualified for command in submarines. He was awarded the Navy Cross for his World War I service as aide to Commander, American Patrol Detachment, Atlantic Fleet, a billet in which he played a significant role in developing the tactics of surface and air forces in combined operations against submarines.

Commander Frost died January 26, 1935, at Kansas City, Missouri, while a member of the staff of the Command and General Staff School, Fort Leavenworth, Kansas.

== Namesake ==
USS Frost (DE-144) was named in his honor. The ship was launched March 21, 1943, by Consolidated Steel Corp., Orange, Texas; sponsored by Mrs. Holloway H. Frost, widow of Commander Frost; and commissioned August 30, 1943, Lieutenant Commander T. S. Lank in command.
