= USS Inch =

1943 Edsall-class destroyer escort

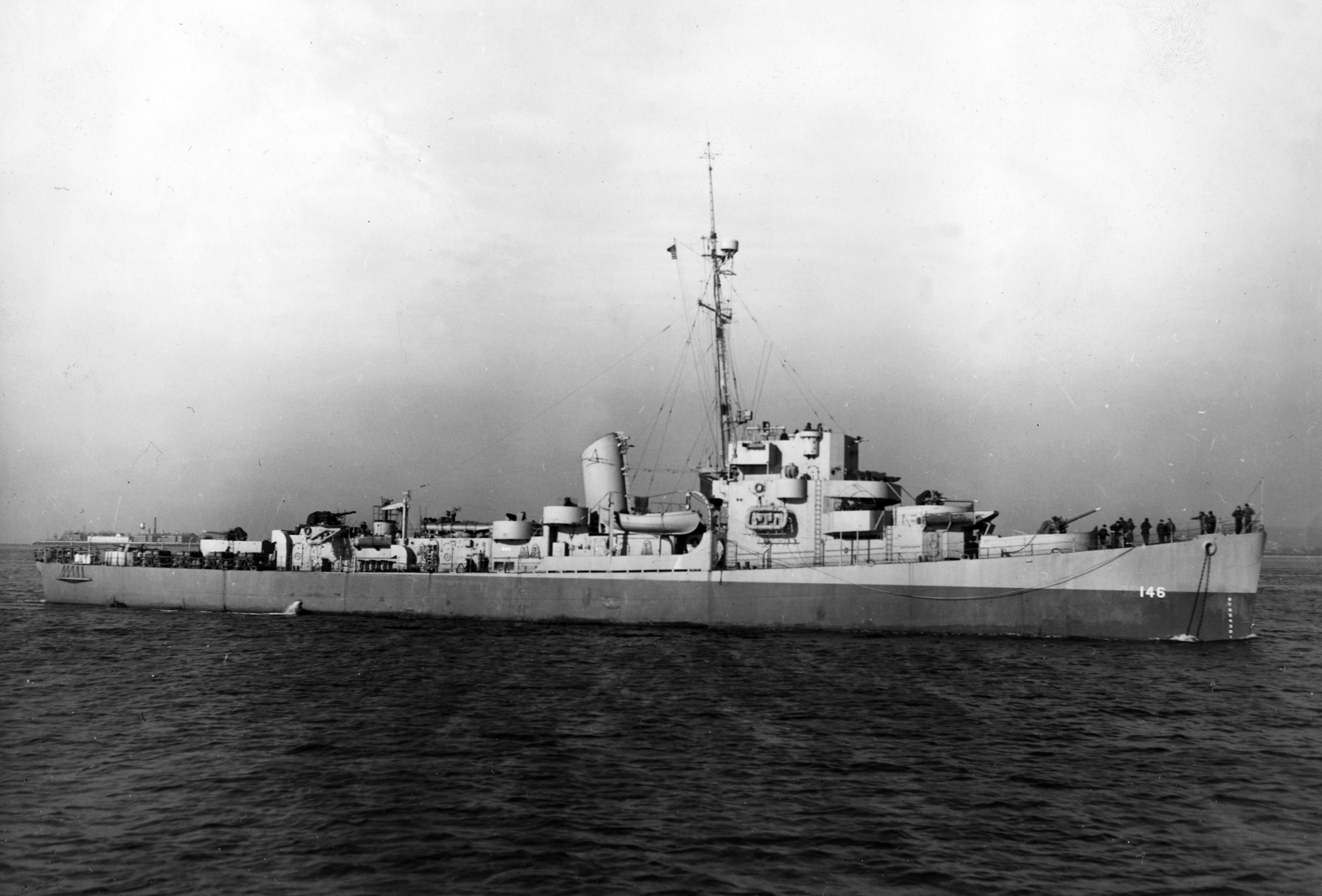

History

United States
- Name: Inch
- Namesake: Richard Inch
- Builder: Consolidated Steel Corporation, Orange, Texas
- Laid down: 19 January 1943
- Launched: 4 April 1943
- Commissioned: 8 September 1943
- Decommissioned: 17 May 1946
- Stricken: 1 October 1972
- Fate: Sold for scrap, 21 March 1974

General characteristics
- Class & type: Edsall-class destroyer escort
- Displacement: 1,253 tons standard; 1,590 tons full load
- Length: 306 ft (93 m)
- Beam: 36.58 ft (11.15 m)
- Draft: 10.42 ft (3.18 m) full load
- Propulsion: 4 FM diesel engines, 4 diesel-generators, 6,000 shp (4,500 kW); 2 screws
- Speed: 21 knots (39 km/h)
- Range: 9,100 nmi (16,900 km; 10,500 mi) at 12 knots (22 km/h; 14 mph)
- Complement: 8 officers, 201 enlisted
- Armament: 3 × single 3 in (76 mm)/50 guns; 1 × twin 40 mm AA guns; 8 × single 20 mm AA guns; 1 × triple 21 in (533 mm) torpedo tubes; 8 × depth charge projectors; 1 × depth charge projector (hedgehog); 2 × depth charge tracks

USS Inch (DE-146) was an Edsall-class destroyer escort in service with the United States Navy from 1943 to 1946. She was scrapped in 1974.

== Namesake ==
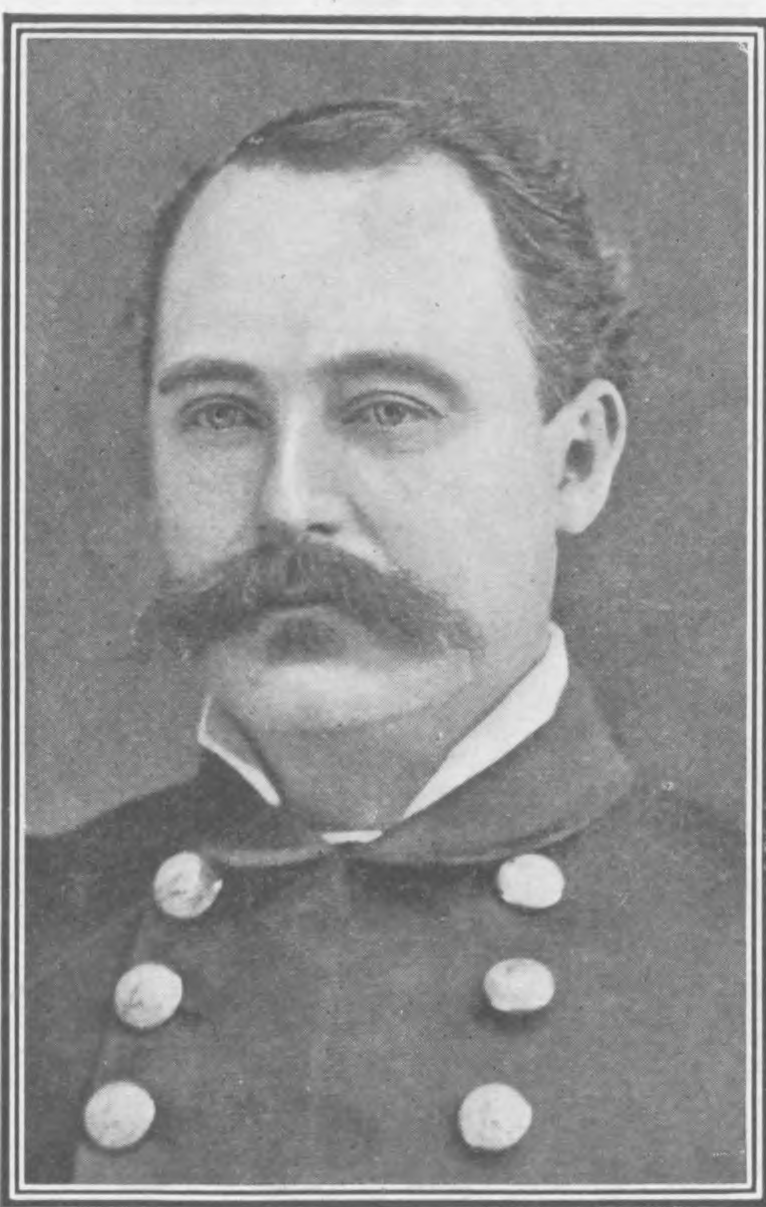

Richard Inch was born on 29 June 1843 at Washington, D.C. He was warranted Third Assistant Engineer on 13 September 1863. He served on USS Lancaster and other ships during the American Civil War. During his long career Inch served as special assistant at the White House, as Inspector of Coal, and as an officer in many of the ships of the fleet. He was at Mare Island Navy Yard during the Spanish–American War, but was assigned to Naval Station Cavite in March 1899. Inch served with distinction during this tumultuous time in the Philippines, and was later advanced three numbers in grade for his performance. He retired as a Rear Admiral in 1905, and died on 21 April 1911 at Washington, D.C.. He is buried at Arlington National Cemetery. He was a companion of the Pennsylvania Commandery of the Military Order of the Loyal Legion of the United States.

== History ==
Inch was laid down on 19 January 1943 by Consolidated Steel Corp, Orange, Texas. The ship was launched on 4 April 1943, sponsored by Mrs. Philip L. Inch, the daughter-in-law of Admiral Inch. Inch was commissioned on 8 September 1943.

=== Battle of the Atlantic ===
Following shakedown off Bermuda, Inch began convoy escort operations from New York to Norfolk. Early in 1944 she joined a special hunter-killer group in the Atlantic, built around the escort carrier USS Croatan. The ships sailed on 24 March for the convoy lanes to search for German U-boats. During the months that followed, Inch took part in many attacks on submarines.

On the evening of 11 June the ship, in company with USS Frost and USS Huse, the three ships made contact with a submarine and proceeded to attack. After over 40 depth charges, the submarine surfaced, signaling SOS. Suspecting a ruse, Inch and her companions opened fire and destroyed German submarine U-490. The entire crew of 60 German sailors was rescued by the escorts. Soon after the attack on U-490, the escort vessels, operating as usual in concert with aircraft from Croatan, detected another submarine. They attacked 3 July and scored another kill, this time on U-154. Inch remained on this duty until reaching New York on 14 May 1945.

=== Pacific War ===
Inch had had only brief in-port periods the preceding year, and after repairs conducted her second shakedown out of Guantanamo Bay, Cuba. With the submarine war in the Atlantic won, Inch sailed to the Pacific, departing the Canal Zone 23 July. She touched at San Diego, California, and Pearl Harbor, and remained in Hawaiian waters for exercises designed to train her for the planned invasion of Japan. Soon after her arrival 12 August, however, the capitulation was announced. After completing training and readiness exercises, Inch sailed 5 September for Norfolk, Virginia, via the Panama Canal, and arrived 28 September 1945.

=== Decommissioning and fate ===
She decommissioned on 17 May 1946, entered the Atlantic Reserve Fleet, and was berthed at Norfolk. She was sold for scrapping to the Southern Scrap Materials Company, New Orleans, Louisiana, on 26 February 1974.

== Awards ==
- American Campaign Medal with two battle stars
- European-African-Middle Eastern Campaign Medal with two battle stars
- Asiatic-Pacific Campaign Medal
- World War II Victory Medal
