= German submarine U-856 =

German World War II submarine

History

Nazi Germany
- Name: U-856
- Ordered: 5 June 1941
- Builder: DeSchiMAG AG Weser, Bremen
- Yard number: 1062
- Laid down: 31 October 1942
- Launched: 11 May 1943
- Commissioned: 19 August 1943
- Fate: Scuttled in position 40°18′N 62°22′W on 7 April 1944 after receiving heavy damage from US warships

General characteristics
- Class & type: Type IXC/40 submarine
- Displacement: 1,144 t (1,126 long tons) surfaced; 1,257 t (1,237 long tons) submerged
- Length: 76.76 m (251 ft 10 in) o/a; 58.75 m (192 ft 9 in) pressure hull
- Beam: 6.86 m (22 ft 6 in) o/a; 4.44 m (14 ft 7 in) pressure hull
- Height: 9.60 m (31 ft 6 in)
- Draught: 4.67 m (15 ft 4 in)
- Installed power: 4,400 PS (3,200 kW; 4,300 bhp) (diesels); 1,000 PS (740 kW; 990 shp) (electric)
- Propulsion: 2 shafts; 2 × diesel engines; 2 × electric motors
- Speed: 19 knots (35 km/h; 22 mph) surfaced; 7.3 knots (13.5 km/h; 8.4 mph) submerged
- Range: 13,850 nmi (25,650 km; 15,940 mi) at 10 knots (19 km/h; 12 mph) surfaced; 63 nmi (117 km; 72 mi) at 4 knots (7.4 km/h; 4.6 mph) submerged
- Test depth: 230 m (750 ft)
- Complement: 4 officers, 44 enlisted
- Armament: 6 × torpedo tubes (four bow, two stern); 22 × 53.3 cm (21 in) torpedoes; 1 × 3.7 cm (1.5 in) SK C/30; 1 × 2 cm (0.79 in) C/30 anti-aircraft gun

Service record
- Part of: 4th U-boat Flotilla; 19 August 1943 – 29 February 1944; 2nd U-boat Flotilla; 1 March – 7 April 1944
- Identification codes: M 54 791
- Commanders: Oblt.z.S. Friedrich Wittenberg; 19 August 1943 – 7 April 1944
- Operations: 1 patrol: 24 February – 7 April 1944
- Victories: None

German submarine U-856 was a Type IXC/40 U-boat built for Nazi Germany's Kriegsmarine during World War II.

== Design ==
German Type IXC/40 submarines were slightly larger than the original Type IXCs. U-856 had a displacement of 1,144 tonnes (1,126 long tons) when at the surface and 1,257 tonnes (1,237 long tons) while submerged. The U-boat had a total length of 76.76 m (251 ft 10 in), a pressure hull length of 58.75 m (192 ft 9 in), a beam of 6.86 m (22 ft 6 in), a height of 9.60 m (31 ft 6 in), and a draught of 4.67 m (15 ft 4 in). The submarine was powered by two MAN M 9 V 40/46 supercharged four-stroke, nine-cylinder diesel engines producing a total of 4,400 metric horsepower (3,240 kW; 4,340 shp) for use while surfaced, two Siemens-Schuckert 2 GU 345/34 double-acting electric motors producing a total of 1,000 shaft horsepower (1,010 PS; 750 kW) for use while submerged. She had two shafts and two 1.92 m (6 ft) propellers. The boat was capable of operating at depths of up to 230 metres (750 ft).

The submarine had a maximum surface speed of 18.3 knots (33.9 km/h; 21.1 mph) and a maximum submerged speed of 7.3 knots (13.5 km/h; 8.4 mph). When submerged, the boat could operate for 63 nautical miles (117 km; 72 mi) at 4 knots (7.4 km/h; 4.6 mph); when surfaced, she could travel 13,850 nautical miles (25,650 km; 15,940 mi) at 10 knots (19 km/h; 12 mph). U-856 was fitted with six 53.3 cm (21 in) torpedo tubes (four fitted at the bow and two at the stern), 22 torpedoes, one 10.5 cm (4.13 in) SK C/32 naval gun, 180 rounds, and a 3.7 cm (1.5 in) SK C/30 as well as a 2 cm (0.79 in) C/30 anti-aircraft gun. The boat had a complement of forty-eight.

== Service history ==
U-856 was ordered on 5 June 1941 from DeSchiMAG AG Weser in Bremen under the yard number 1062. Her keel was laid down on 31 October 1942 and the U-boat was launched the following year on 11 May 1943. She was commissioned into service under the command of Oberleutnant zur See Friedrich Wittenberg (Crew X/37) in 4th U-boat Flotilla.

The U-boat was working up for deployment in the Baltic Sea until transferring to the 2nd U-boat Flotilla for front-line service. She left Kiel on 24 February 1944 for operations off the US east coast. In March she had two brief encounters with submarine-hunting aircraft, but escaped unscathed. In the morning of 7 April 1944 however, she was picked up by an aircraft of USS Croatan and attacked by USS Boyle. Surviving the initial attack, she was attacked with depth charges by a second group consisting of USS Huse and USS Champlin, the later ramming U-856 and severely damaging her. When the U-boat re-surfaced a little while later, she came under heavy artillery fire from the US warships. Wittenberg ordered the crew to abandon ship and scuttled her. Of the 55 men on board only 28, Wittenberg among them, survived. They were picked up by the destroyers and brought to New York City where they disembarked on 10 April 1944.

== Bibliography ==
- Busch, Rainer; Röll, Hans-Joachim (1999). German U-boat commanders of World War II: a biographical dictionary. Translated by Brooks, Geoffrey. London, Annapolis, Md: Greenhill Books, Naval Institute Press. ISBN 1-55750-186-6.
- Busch, Rainer; Röll, Hans-Joachim (1999). Der U-Boot-Krieg, 1939-1945: Deutsche U-Boot-Verluste von September 1939 bis Mai 1945 [German U-boat losses from September 1939 to May 1945] (in German). Vol. IV. Hamburg, Berlin, Bonn: Mittler. ISBN 3-8132-0514-2.
- Gröner, Eric; Jung, Dieter; Maass, Martin (1991). German Warships 1815-1945: U-boats and Mine Warfare Vessels. Vol. 2. Translated by Thomas, Keith; Magowan, Rachel. London: Conway Maritime Press. ISBN 0-85177-593-4.

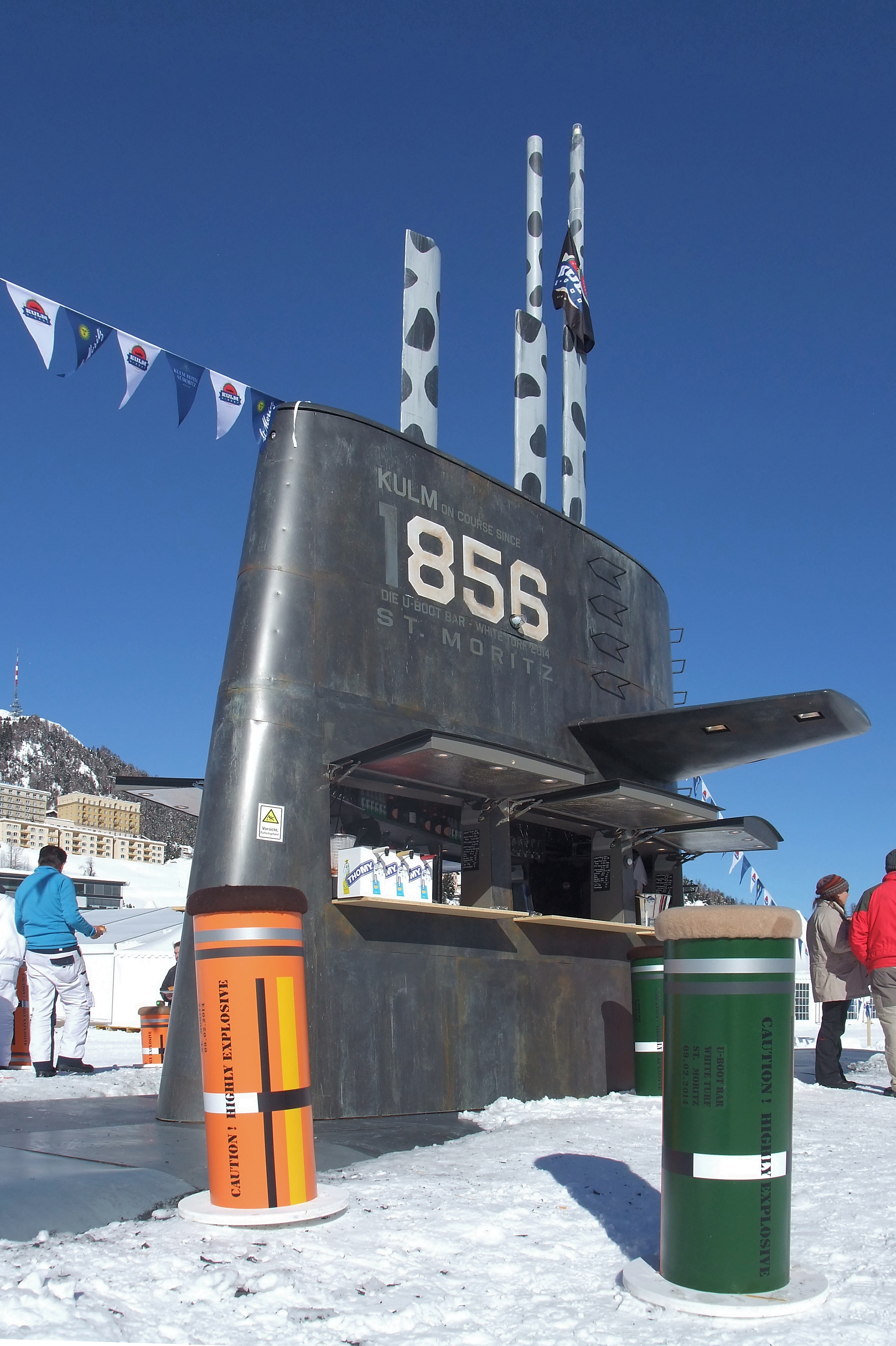
U-856 replica in frozen Lake St. Moritz, Switzerland, used as bar
