= German submarine U-488 =

German World War II submarine

Coordinates: 17°54′N 38°05′W

History

Nazi Germany
- Name: U-488
- Ordered: 17 July 1941
- Builder: Germaniawerft, Kiel
- Yard number: 557
- Laid down: 3 January 1942
- Launched: 17 October 1942
- Commissioned: 1 February 1943
- Fate: Sunk on 26 April 1944

General characteristics
- Class & type: Type XIV ocean-going submarine tanker
- Displacement: 1,688 t (1,661 long tons) surfaced; 1,932 t (1,901 long tons) submerged
- Length: 67.10 m (220 ft 2 in) o/a; 48.51 m (159 ft 2 in) pressure hull
- Beam: 9.35 m (30 ft 8 in) o/a; 4.90 m (16 ft 1 in) pressure hull
- Height: 11.70 m (38 ft 5 in)
- Draught: 6.51 m (21 ft 4 in)
- Installed power: 2,800–3,200 PS (2,100–2,400 kW; 2,800–3,200 bhp) (diesels); 750 PS (550 kW; 740 shp) (electric)
- Propulsion: 2 shafts; 2 × diesel engines; 2 × electric motors
- Speed: 14.4–14.9 knots (26.7–27.6 km/h; 16.6–17.1 mph) surfaced; 6.2 knots (11.5 km/h; 7.1 mph) submerged
- Range: 12,350 nmi (22,870 km; 14,210 mi) at 10 knots (19 km/h; 12 mph) surfaced; 55 nmi (102 km; 63 mi) at 4 knots (7.4 km/h; 4.6 mph) submerged
- Test depth: 240 m (790 ft)
- Complement: 6 officers and 47 enlisted
- Armament: 2 × 3.7 cm (1.5 in) SK C/30 anti-aircraft guns; 1 × 2 cm (0.79 in) C/30 AA gun

Service record
- Part of: 4th U-boat Flotilla; 1 February – 30 April 1943; 12th U-boat Flotilla; 1 May 1943 – 26 April 1944
- Identification codes: M 49 793
- Commanders: Oblt.z.S. Erwin Bartke; 1 February 1943 – February 1944; Oblt.z.S. Bruno Studt; February – 26 April 1944
- Operations: 3 patrols: 1st patrol: 18 May – 10 July 1943; 2nd patrol: 7 September – 12 December 1943; 3rd patrol: 22 February – 26 April 1944
- Victories: None

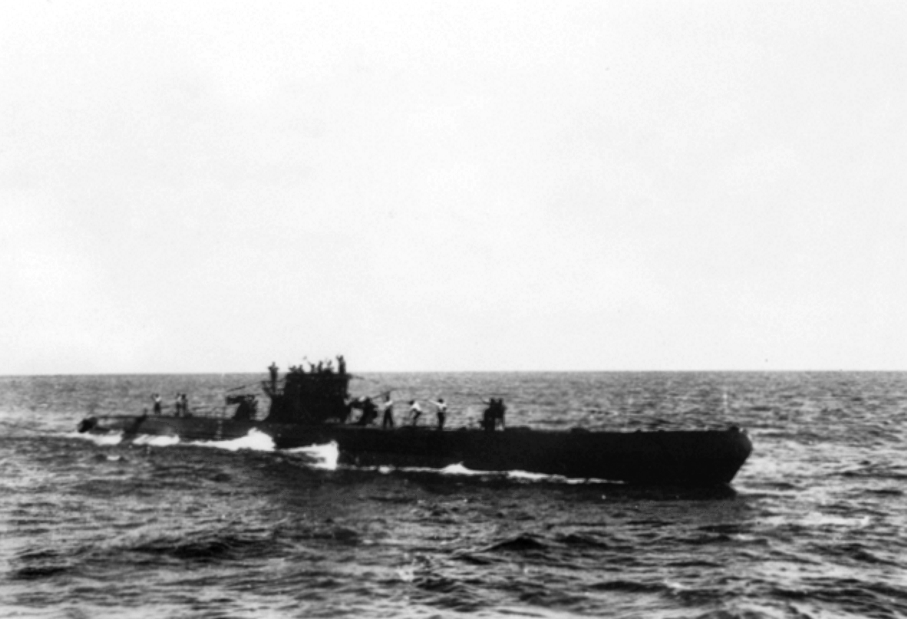
Image of the submarine U-461

German submarine U-488 was a Type XIV supply and replenishment U-boat ("Milchkuh") of Nazi Germany's Kriegsmarine during World War II.

Her keel was laid down on 3 January 1942 by Germaniawerft in Kiel as yard number 557. She was launched on 17 October 1942 and commissioned on 1 February 1943, with Leutnant zur See Erwin Bartke in command. Bartke was promoted to Oberleutnant zur See by February 1944; he was relieved by Oblt.z.S. Bruno Studt.

The boat's service began with training under the 4th U-boat Flotilla and culminated with the 12th flotilla for operations.

== Design ==
German Type XIV submarines were shortened versions of the Type IXDs they were based on. U-488 had a displacement of 1,688 tonnes (1,661 long tons) when at the surface and 1,932 tonnes (1,901 long tons) while submerged. The U-boat had a total length of 67.10 m (220 ft 2 in), a pressure hull length of 48.51 m (159 ft 2 in), a beam of 9.35 m (30 ft 8 in), a height of 11.70 m (38 ft 5 in), and a draught of 6.51 m (21 ft 4 in). The submarine was powered by two Germaniawerft supercharged four-stroke, six-cylinder diesel engines producing a total of 2,800–3,200 metric horsepower (2,060–2,350 kW; 2,760–3,160 shp) for use while surfaced, two Siemens-Schuckert 2 GU 345/38-8 double-acting electric motors producing a total of 750 metric horsepower (550 kW; 740 shp) for use while submerged. She had two shafts and two propellers. The boat was capable of operating at depths of up to 240 metres (790 ft).

The submarine had a maximum surface speed of 14.4–14.9 knots (26.7–27.6 km/h; 16.6–17.1 mph) and a maximum submerged speed of 6.2 knots (11.5 km/h; 7.1 mph). When submerged, the boat could operate for 120 nautical miles (220 km; 140 mi) at 2 knots (3.7 km/h; 2.3 mph); when surfaced, she could travel 12,350 nautical miles (22,870 km; 14,210 mi) at 10 knots (19 km/h; 12 mph). U-488 was not fitted with torpedo tubes or deck guns, but had two 3.7 cm (1.5 in) SK C/30 anti-aircraft guns with 2500 rounds as well as a 2 cm (0.79 in) C/30 guns with 3000 rounds. The boat had a complement of fifty-three.

== Operational career ==
U-488 conducted three patrols. As a supply boat, she avoided combat.

=== First patrol ===
U-488's first patrol commenced when she left Kiel on 18 May 1943. She cleared the British Isles, sailing through the gap between the Faroe Islands and Iceland and out into the central Atlantic. On the return journey, she passed to the north-west of the Azores and reached Bordeaux in occupied France on 10 July 1943.

=== Second patrol ===
She was attacked on her second patrol on 12 October 1943 by two Avengers from the escort carrier USS Card. The aircraft claimed a sinking, but U-488 was able to continue her mission.

On 15 October, Maschinenmaat Karl Bergmann died of an illness. On 25 November, Matrosenobergefreiter Heinz Heinlein fell overboard. He was rescued, but died of heart failure shortly afterwards.

The U-boat returned to Bordeaux on 12 December 1943.

=== Third patrol and loss ===
The boat departed Bordeaux for the last time on 22 April 1944. U-488 was sunk with all hands (64 dead) on the 26th in the mid-Atlantic west of Cape Verde by depth charges from the American destroyer escorts USS Frost, Huse, Barber and Snowden.

=== Wolfpacks ===
U-488 took part in one wolfpack, namely:

- Trutz (6 – 12 June 1943)

== Bibliography ==
- Busch, Rainer; Röll, Hans-Joachim (1999). German U-boat commanders of World War II : a biographical dictionary. Translated by Brooks, Geoffrey. London, Annapolis, Md: Greenhill Books, Naval Institute Press. ISBN 1-55750-186-6.
- Busch, Rainer; Röll, Hans-Joachim (1999). Deutsche U-Boot-Verluste von September 1939 bis Mai 1945 [German U-boat losses from September 1939 to May 1945]. Der U-Boot-Krieg (in German). Vol. IV. Hamburg, Berlin, Bonn: Mittler. ISBN 3-8132-0514-2.
- Gröner, Erich; Jung, Dieter; Maass, Martin (1991). U-boats and Mine Warfare Vessels. German Warships 1815–1945. Vol. 2. Translated by Thomas, Keith; Magowan, Rachel. London: Conway Maritime Press. ISBN 0-85177-593-4.
- Kemp, Paul (1999). U-Boats Destroyed – German Submarine Losses in the World Wars. London: Arms & Armour. ISBN 1-85409-515-3.
