= German submarine U-490 =

German World War II submarine

Coordinates: 42°47′N 40°08′W

History

Nazi Germany
- Name: U-490
- Ordered: 17 July 1941
- Builder: Germaniawerft, Kiel
- Yard number: 559
- Laid down: 21 February 1942
- Launched: 24 December 1942
- Commissioned: 27 March 1943
- Fate: Sunk on 12 June 1944

General characteristics
- Class & type: Type XIV ocean-going submarine tanker
- Displacement: 1,688 t (1,661 long tons) surfaced; 1,932 t (1,901 long tons) submerged
- Length: 67.10 m (220 ft 2 in) o/a; 48.51 m (159 ft 2 in) pressure hull
- Beam: 9.35 m (30 ft 8 in) o/a; 4.90 m (16 ft 1 in) pressure hull
- Height: 11.70 m (38 ft 5 in)
- Draught: 6.51 m (21 ft 4 in)
- Installed power: 2,800–3,200 PS (2,100–2,400 kW; 2,800–3,200 bhp) (diesels); 750 PS (550 kW; 740 shp) (electric)
- Propulsion: 2 shafts; 2 × diesel engines; 2 × electric motors
- Speed: 14.4–14.9 knots (26.7–27.6 km/h; 16.6–17.1 mph) surfaced; 6.2 knots (11.5 km/h; 7.1 mph) submerged
- Range: 12,350 nmi (22,870 km; 14,210 mi) at 10 knots (19 km/h; 12 mph) surfaced; 55 nmi (102 km; 63 mi) at 4 knots (7.4 km/h; 4.6 mph) submerged
- Test depth: 240 m (790 ft)
- Complement: 6 officers and 47 enlisted
- Armament: 2 × 3.7 cm (1.5 in) SK C/30 anti-aircraft guns; 1 × 2 cm (0.79 in) C/30 AA gun

Service record
- Part of: 4th U-boat Flotilla; 27 March 1943 – 31 March 1944; 12th U-boat Flotilla; 1 April – 12 June 1944
- Identification codes: M 51 045
- Commanders: Oblt.z.S. Wilhelm Gerlach; 27 March 1943 – 12 June 1944
- Operations: 1st patrol: 4 May – 12 June 1944
- Victories: None

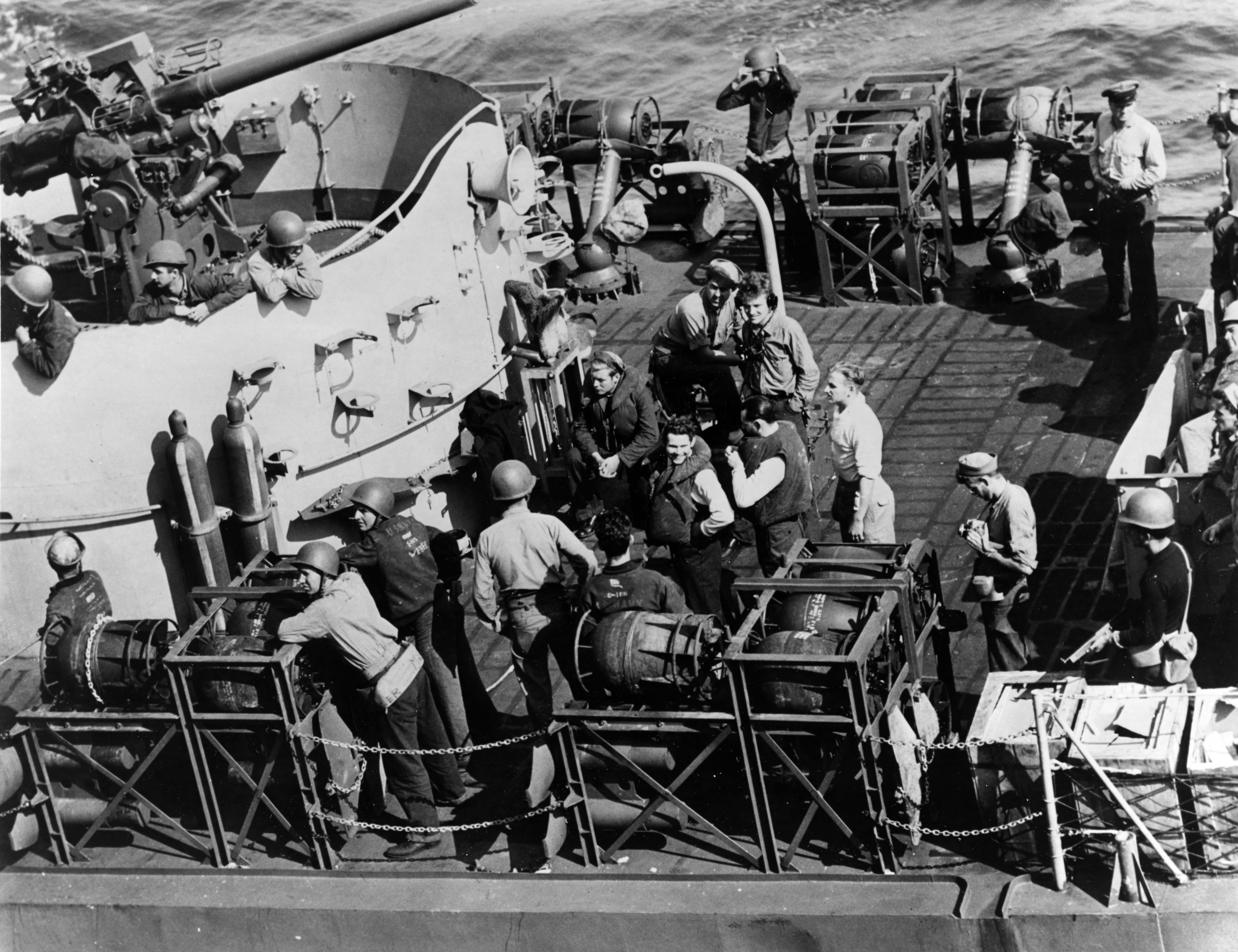
The U.S. Navy destroyer escort USS Inch (DE-146) with prisoners from German submarine U-490 (center, two wearing life vests, one in shirtsleeves) on her quarter deck, awaiting transfer to the escort carrier USS Croatan (CVE-25), 12 June 1944. U-490 had been sunk the previous night. Note the K-guns with fast-sinking streamlined depth charges mounted on the ship's side, 3/50 dual-purpose gun in upper left, photographer and guard with a Thompson submachine gun (both at right).

German submarine U-490 was a Type XIV supply and replenishment U-boat ("Milchkuh") of Nazi Germany's Kriegsmarine during World War II.

Her keel was laid down on 21 February 1942, by Germaniawerft of Kiel as yard number 559. She was launched on 24 December 1942 and commissioned on 27 March 1943, with Leutnant zur See Wilhelm Gerlach in command. He remained in command throughout the boat's career.

The U-boat's service life commenced with the 4th U-boat Flotilla from 27 March 1943 until 31 March 1944 for training. She then served, for operations, with the 12th flotilla.

== Design ==
German Type XIV submarines were shortened versions of the Type IXDs they were based on. U-490 had a displacement of 1,688 tonnes (1,661 long tons) when at the surface and 1,932 tonnes (1,901 long tons) while submerged. The U-boat had a total length of 67.10 m (220 ft 2 in), a pressure hull length of 48.51 m (159 ft 2 in), a beam of 9.35 m (30 ft 8 in), a height of 11.70 m (38 ft 5 in), and a draught of 6.51 m (21 ft 4 in). The submarine was powered by two Germaniawerft supercharged four-stroke, six-cylinder diesel engines producing a total of 2,800–3,200 metric horsepower (2,060–2,350 kW; 2,760–3,160 shp) for use while surfaced, two Siemens-Schuckert 2 GU 345/38-8 double-acting electric motors producing a total of 750 metric horsepower (550 kW; 740 shp) for use while submerged. She had two shafts and two propellers. The boat was capable of operating at depths of up to 240 metres (790 ft).

The submarine had a maximum surface speed of 14.4–14.9 knots (26.7–27.6 km/h; 16.6–17.1 mph) and a maximum submerged speed of 6.2 knots (11.5 km/h; 7.1 mph). When submerged, the boat could operate for 120 nautical miles (220 km; 140 mi) at 2 knots (3.7 km/h; 2.3 mph); when surfaced, she could travel 12,350 nautical miles (22,870 km; 14,210 mi) at 10 knots (19 km/h; 12 mph). U-490 was not fitted with torpedo tubes or deck guns, but had two 3.7 cm (1.5 in) SK C/30 anti-aircraft guns with 2500 rounds as well as a 2 cm (0.79 in) C/30 guns with 3000 rounds. The boat had a complement of fifty-three.

== Operational career ==
U-490's only patrol began with her departure from Kiel on 4 May 1944. She headed for the Atlantic by way of the so-called Faeroes Gap between Iceland and the Faeroe Islands, north of the British Isles.

Although as a supply boat, she avoided combat, she was lost on her first patrol when on 12 June, she was attacked in mid-ocean by the escort carrier USS Croatan and the destroyers Frost, Huse and Inch. There were 60 survivors (no casualties).

== Bibliography ==
- Busch, Rainer; Röll, Hans-Joachim (1999). German U-boat commanders of World War II : a biographical dictionary. Translated by Brooks, Geoffrey. London, Annapolis, Md: Greenhill Books, Naval Institute Press. ISBN 1-55750-186-6.
- Busch, Rainer; Röll, Hans-Joachim (1999). Deutsche U-Boot-Verluste von September 1939 bis Mai 1945 [German U-boat losses from September 1939 to May 1945]. Der U-Boot-Krieg (in German). Vol. IV. Hamburg, Berlin, Bonn: Mittler. ISBN 3-8132-0514-2.
- Gröner, Erich; Jung, Dieter; Maass, Martin (1991). U-boats and Mine Warfare Vessels. German Warships 1815–1945. Vol. 2. Translated by Thomas, Keith; Magowan, Rachel. London: Conway Maritime Press. ISBN 0-85177-593-4.
- Kemp, Paul (1999). U-Boats Destroyed – German Submarine Losses in the World Wars. London: Arms & Armour. ISBN 1-85409-515-3.
