= Thomas Snowden =

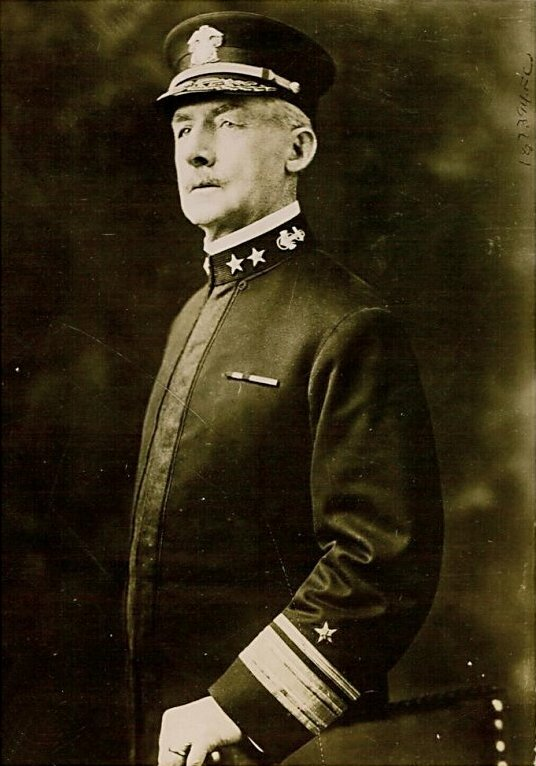
Official portrait, c. 1917

Thomas Snowden (August 12, 1857 - January 27, 1930) was a career officer in the United States Navy. He attained the rank of rear admiral, and received the Navy Cross for his service in World War I.

== Navy career ==
Snowden was born in Peekskill, New York. He was appointed a Cadet Midshipman on June 25, 1875, and graduated from the U.S. Naval Academy in 1879.

He served in USS Vandalia (1876), USS Standish (1864), USS Monongahela (1862), USS Dolphin (PG-24), and USS Constellation (1854). Snowden was assigned to the Hydrographic Office, U.S. Naval Observatory, U.S. Naval Academy, Naval War College, and the Office of Naval Intelligence. From 1902 to 1905, he served as navigator of USS Illinois (BB-7) and then returned to Naval Intelligence before joining the Bureau of Equipment.

== Awarded the Navy Cross ==
Snowden returned to sea in 1908 and commanded USS Mayflower (PY-1), USS South Carolina (BB-26), and USS Wyoming (BM-10). He was promoted to rear admiral in 1917 and, during World War I, served as Commander, Squadron 1 and Division 2, Battleship Force, Atlantic Fleet. Admiral Snowden was awarded the Navy Cross for his service in World War I.

== Assigned as Military Governor ==
After serving with the Atlantic Fleet until 1919, Snowden was assigned duty as the Military Governor of Santo Domingo with additional duty as Military Representative of the United States in Haiti.

== Retirement ==
Snowden was transferred to the Retired List on August 12, 1921 and died on January 27, 1930. He was buried at Arlington National Cemetery, Section 2, Site: 1127.
