= USS Hyades =

Cargo ship of the United States Navy

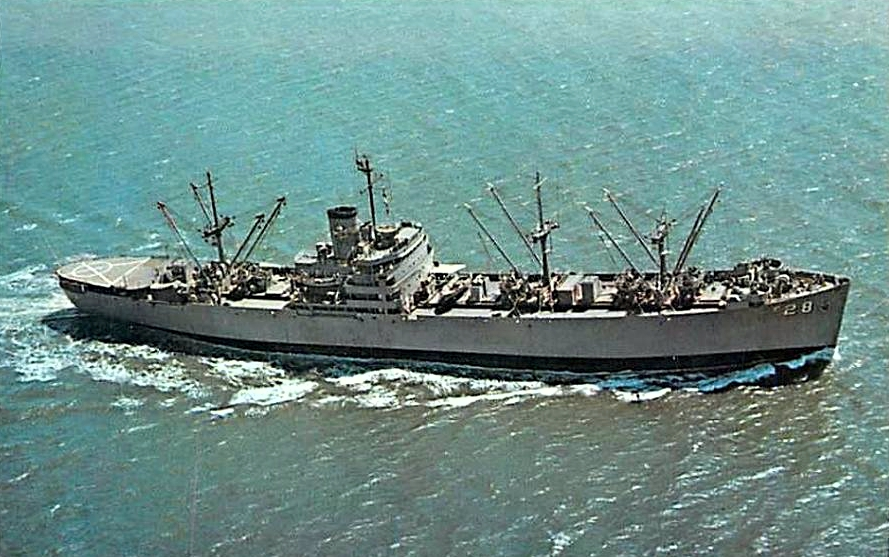

History

United States
- Ordered: as SS Iberville, C2-S-E1 hull, MC 481
- Laid down: 12 October 1942
- Launched: 12 June 1943
- Commissioned: USS Hyades (AF-28), 1 August 1944
- Decommissioned: late 1968
- Stricken: 1 October 1976
- Fate: Scrapped 17 January 1984

General characteristics
- Displacement: 7,700 t.(lt) 13,893 t.(fl)
- Length: 469 ft 9 in (143.18 m)
- Beam: 63 ft (19 m)
- Draught: 25 ft 11 in (7.90 m)
- Propulsion: steam turbine, single shaft, 6,300shp
- Speed: 16 kts.
- Complement: 252
- Armament: one single 5"/38 dual purpose gun mount; four single 3"/50 dual purpose gun mounts

USS Hyades (AF-28) was the lead ship of her class of stores ships acquired by the U.S. Navy for service in World War II. Her task was to carry stores, refrigerated items, and equipment to ships in the fleet and to remote stations and staging areas.

Hyades, ex.-SS Iberville, was launched under Maritime Commission contract by Gulf Shipbuilding Co., Chickasaw, Alabama, 12 June 1943; sponsored by Mrs. L. R. Sanford; and commissioned at Bethlehem Steel, Baltimore, Maryland, after conversion, 1 August 1944.

== World War II service ==
Hyades got underway 11 September 1944 for Trinidad and the Panama Canal, escorted by destroyer Warrington (DD-383).

=== Rescuing survivors of Warrington ===
In the Caribbean Hyades and Warrington encountered a severe hurricane. By 13 September Warrington was foundering. The heavy weather had separated the two ships. When the destroyer went down, Hyades proceeded to her last known position to pick up survivors. She rescued 61 before proceeding to Panama, where she arrived 19 September.

=== Transfer to the Pacific Fleet ===
The refrigerator ship steamed to Majuro to supply the fleet with foodstuffs 10 October, touching at Kwajalein, Eniwetok, and other bases before returning to San Francisco, California. Underway again 1 December 1944, the ship made two more voyages to the advance bases and the Philippines with stores, returning to Seattle, Washington, from the second cruise 13 April 1945. She continued on this duty, so vital to the support of the huge U.S. Pacific Fleet, until well after the surrender of Japan. In addition to supplying ships she brought food and supplies to many shore bases.

== Post-war operations ==
In 1946 Hyades brought supplies to American ground troops in China, spending March at Qingdao and April at Hong Kong. In 1947 she spent several months at Shanghai. She then operated out of San Francisco, bringing supplies to the various occupation groups and island outposts in the Pacific Ocean.

== Return to the Atlantic Ocean ==
The ship sailed through the Panama Canal to Norfolk, Virginia, to join the Atlantic Fleet, arriving 14 June 1948. She departed for her first cruise to the Mediterranean 12 July 1948, during which she operated with the fast Carrier forces serving as a mobile replenishment ship. Hyades brought supplies and showed the flag in many Mediterranean ports, including Piraeus, Greece, Naples, Italy, Valencia, Spain, and Gibraltar.

== Suez crisis operations ==
As tension mounted in the Mediterranean in early 1956, Hyades replenished destroyers patrolling the eastern Mediterranean, returning to Norfolk 28 February. She later rendezvoused with powerful fleet units in July, including Iowa (BB-53), New Jersey (BB-62), Des Moines (CA-134), and Macon (CA-132), as American naval power moved in to prevent the widening of the Suez Crisis. In April 1957 the ship replenished carrier Lake Champlain (CV-39) during moves to support the threatened government of Jordan and took part in an important NATO fleet exercise during September–October in northern European waters.

== Visiting Crete and Turkey ==
In the years that followed, Hyades continued to support the U.S. 6th Fleet in its cold war operations in the Mediterranean. During August–September 1958, she visited Crete and Turkey when the latter country was threatened. In 1959, she sailed 11 May for fleet replenishment in response to the heightened Berlin crisis. The veteran stores ship returned twice more to the Mediterranean in 1959, and again in 1960 and 1961.

== Cuban Missile Crisis operations ==
Hyades responded quickly in the Cuban Missile Crisis of 1962, arriving at Guantanamo Bay 22 October to evacuate dependents as the introduction of offensive missiles resulted in a U.S. naval quarantine of Cuba. After the safe evacuation, the ship returned to the quarantine line for underway replenishment of the ships patrolling off the island. After the easing of the situation in December, Hyades entered Home Bros. Shipyard in Newport News, Virginia, for the installation of a helicopter deck aft to increase her versatility and replenishment capabilities.

== Participating in Operation Springboard ==
During 1963 the ship cruised with the 6th Fleet in July and August. In 1964 she took part in Operation Springboard in the Caribbean, returning to Norfolk 1 February 1964. Hyades continued to serve the Fleet through the mid-1960s and in late 1967 was based at Norfolk, Virginia.

In May 1968, the Hyades was near the Azores en route to the Mediterranean when she received word of the disappearance of the U.S. Navy submarine USS Scorpion. She was the first to arrive, finding nothing. When other ships joined the search, the Hyades continued on. A lookout aboard the Hyades had earlier reported spotting an orange distress buoy in the water, but it did not get reported to the captain, and as a result of the responsible lieutenant's inaction, he was later court-martialed.

== Decommissioning ==
Hyades was decommissioned in late 1968 at the Naval shipyard in Philadelphia, and struck from the Naval Register, 1 October 1976. After being laid up in the Reserve Fleet, she was transferred to the Maritime Administration (MARAD) for disposal, 13 October 1983.

She was sold to the Jacobson Metal Co on 17 January 1984 and broken up.

== Military awards and honors ==
Hyades’ crew was eligible for the following medals and ribbons:

- China Service Medal (extended)
- American Campaign Medal
- Asiatic-Pacific Campaign Medal
- World War II Victory Medal
- Navy Occupation Service Medal (with Asia clasp)
- National Defense Service Medal
- Armed Forces Expeditionary Medal (2-Cuba & 1-Lebanon)
- Philippine Liberation Medal
