= USS Stanton =

1943 Edsall-class destroyer escort

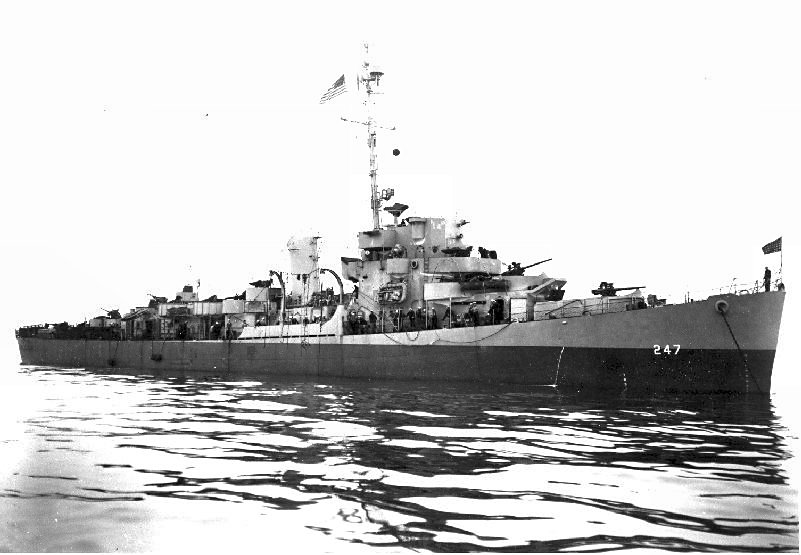

History

United States
- Namesake: Oscar F. Stanton
- Builder: Brown Shipbuilding Houston, Texas
- Laid down: 7 December 1942
- Launched: 21 February 1943
- Commissioned: 7 August 1943
- Decommissioned: 2 June 1947
- Stricken: 1 December 1970
- Fate: Scrapped or sunk as target

General characteristics
- Class & type: Edsall-class destroyer escort
- Displacement: 1,253 tons standard; 1,590 tons full load
- Length: 306 feet (93.27 m)
- Beam: 36.58 feet (11.15 m)
- Draft: 10.42 full load feet (3.18 m)
- Propulsion: 4 FM diesel engines, 4 diesel-generators, 6,000 shp (4.5 MW), 2 screws
- Speed: 21 knots (39 km/h)
- Range: 9,100 nmi. at 12 knots; (17,000 km at 22 km/h)
- Complement: 8 officers, 201 enlisted
- Armament: 3 × single 3 in (76 mm)/50 guns; 1 × twin 40 mm AA guns; 8 × single 20 mm AA guns; 1 × triple 21 in (533 mm) torpedo tubes; 8 × depth charge projectors; 1 × depth charge projector (hedgehog); 2 × depth charge tracks

USS Stanton (DE-247) was an Edsall-class destroyer escort built for the U.S. Navy during World War II. She served in the Atlantic Ocean the Pacific Ocean and provided destroyer escort protection against submarine and air attack for Navy vessels and convoys.

She was named in honor of Rear Admiral Oscar F. Stanton (1834–1924). As rear admiral in 1893, Stanton commanded the South Atlantic Squadron and, the next year, the North Atlantic Squadron until his retirement on 1 August 1894.

She was laid down on 7 December 1942 by Brown Shipbuilding Co., Houston, Texas; launched on 21 February 1943, sponsored by Mrs. William S. Burrell, and commissioned on 7 August 1943.

== World War II North Atlantic operations ==
Stanton got underway on 29 August 1943 for San Juan, Puerto Rico, to join the destroyer escort shakedown group and, a month later, arrived at the Charleston Navy Yard. She then moved up the coast to New York City and departed there on 18 October for Trinidad and Guantánamo Bay, Cuba. The escort returned to Norfolk, Virginia, and was attached to Escort Division (CortDiv) 3. Stanton sailed on 25 November with Task Force (TF) 64 as an escort for convoy UGS-25 bound for the Mediterranean. The convoy arrived at Casablanca on 13 December. The escorts picked up convoy GUS-24 there and headed for the United States on 15 December 1943 and arrived safely at New York on 3 January 1944.

== Attacked by Luftwaffe aircraft ==
This section needs additional citations for verification.

Stanton escorted other convoys to North Africa and back, as a unit in task force TF 64 or TF 65. These included UGS-31, GUS-30, and UGS-37. She was the flagship of TF 65, escort for UGS-37 which consisted of over 60 ships, steaming from Norfolk to Bizerte, when it was attacked by the Luftwaffe. The convoy was off Algeria on the evening of 11 April when an enemy aircraft was reported in the area. Just before midnight, approximately two dozen Dornier 217's and Ju. 88's attacked. Stanton opened fire on a plane which crossed her bow and later had a stick of bombs fall close aboard. USS Holder was torpedoed in the port side by one of the low flying planes, but no merchant ships or LST's were hit. The convoy reached Bizerte the next day, and Stanton returned to New York with convoy GUS-37.

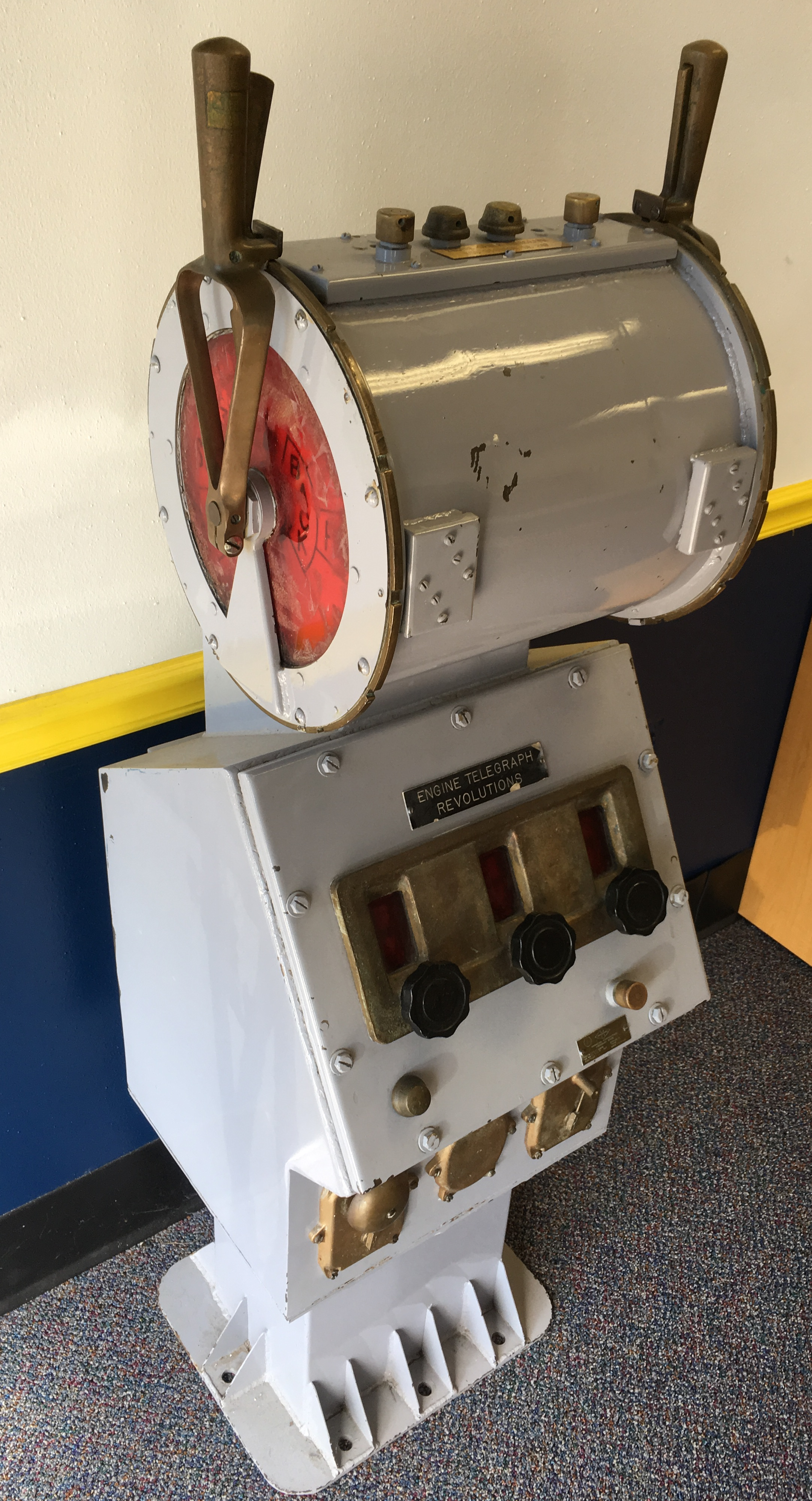
Engine room telegraph from USS Stanton

== Stateside repairs ==
She was in drydock until early May, and then participated in maneuvers off Cape May, New Jersey, before sailing to Hampton Roads, Virginia. She arrived on 30 May and was attached to CortDiv 13, Atlantic Fleet. Stanton joined convoy UGS-44, escorted it to Bizerte, and remained there from 22 to 30 June when she began the return voyage with convoy GUS 44 bound for New York.

Stanton was attached to the 6th Atlantic Fleet and held training exercises in Casco Bay from 30 July until she returned to New York to escort a section of convoy UGS-51 to Norfolk. The convoy sortied from there but, on the 19th, Stanton was ordered to proceed to the Boston Navy Yard for alterations and improvements. These lasted until mid-October after which she held sea trials and tested her new equipment and proceeded to Bermuda.

Stanton arrived at Port Royal Bay on 5 November, joined the screen of USS Croatan and returned to New York on 13 November 1944. The task group then proceeded to Guantánamo Bay via Norfolk to hold joint exercises, and returned to Norfolk in late December. On 10 January 1945, Stanton and CortDiv 13, with Croatan, steamed to Bermuda to continue antisubmarine warfare exercises in conjunction with flight operations. Upon completion of the training period, the task group called at New York on 4 February; shifted to the Naval Ammunition Depot, Earle, New Jersey, to load ammunition, and then sailed to Casco Bay for carrier qualification exercises. During the last week in March, the submarine hunter-killer group took its assigned position in the north central Atlantic, midway between Newfoundland and England as part of Operation Teardrop.

== Sinking German submarines ==
On 15 April 1945, Stanton made surface radar contact range 3,500 yards, and headed for the target. The U-boat disappeared from the radar screen, but sonar contact was made. Stanton fired a pattern of hedgehogs and a deep rumble followed their explosions.

Contact was regained, and another pattern was fired. This was followed by a heavy underwater explosion. Sonar contact was made again, and Stanton attacked. After this there was a tremendous explosion that shook the task group. USS Frost joined in the attack with her hedgehogs shortly after midnight. The two DE's kept pounding the contact until there was an explosion of such magnitude that it shook some of the group 10 miles away. Then, contact was lost, and so was U-1285. Just before 0200 on the 16th, Frost made a surface contact at 500 yards, fired starshells to no avail, and finally illuminated a U-boat with her searchlight. Frost opened fire with her deck guns as the submarine submerged and made several hits on the conning tower. Contact was lost so Stanton and Huse joined the search. At 0406, Stanton fired a hedgehog pattern over a contact that produced an explosion so violent that she thought she had been torpedoed and rocked Croatan 15 miles away. Frost fired one more pattern which produced three deep explosions. Diesel fuel already covered the surface of the sea, and sonar contact slowly faded. This was the end of U-880. The task group returned to Argentia, Newfoundland, from 22 to 28 April, to refuel and rearm before resuming antisubmarine patrols.

== Transferred to the Pacific Fleet ==
War with Germany ended in May 1945, and Stanton put into New York for fuel. She then was routed to Charleston, South Carolina, for yard availability. On 1 July, CortDiv 13 was assigned to the Pacific Fleet, and Stanton, with Swasey sailed for Hawaii, via Panama and San Diego, California. They arrived at Pearl Harbor on 9 August, a week before hostilities with Japan ended. Stanton participated in antisubmarine warfare practice until 22 August when she was detached from the Pacific Fleet and ordered to return to the Atlantic seaboard.

== Post-War activity ==
Stanton was in February 1946 sent to the Bikini's and participated in the United States atomic bombs test there. She was then moved to Norfolk, Virginia, on 28 September and the following month was assigned to the Atlantic Reserve Fleet at Green Cove Springs, Florida, moored, and provided steam and electrical services to units of CortDiv 36 from 1 January 1946 to 2 June 1947.

== Post-War decommissioning ==
On the latter date Stanton was placed in reserve, out of commission, and the skeleton crew of 64 was transferred. She was struck from the Navy List on 1 December 1970. The U.S. Navy lists her as being disposed of in support of a Fleet training exercise in 1972.

== Awards ==
Stanton received three battle stars for World War II service.
