= USS Champlin (DD-601) =

Benson-class destroyer

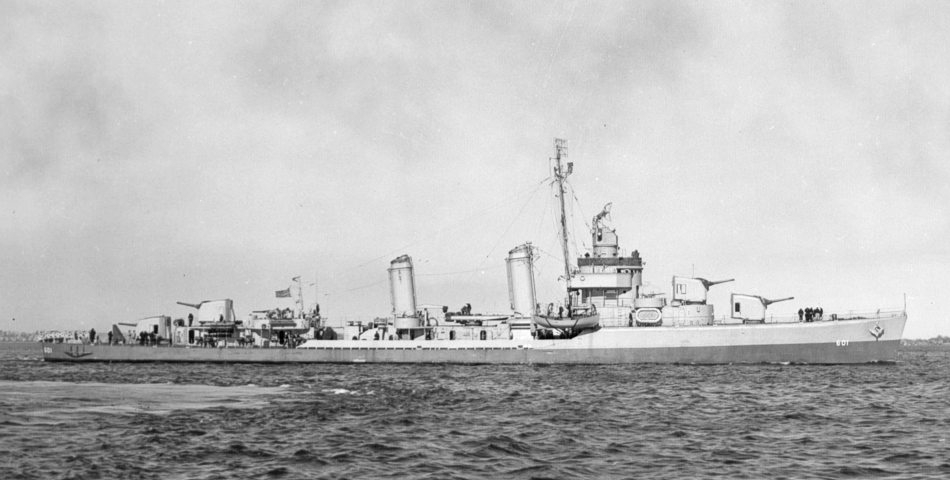
- USS Champlin (DD-601) at Boston in November 1942

History

United States
- Name: USS Champlin (DD-601)
- Namesake: Stephen Champlin
- Builder: Fore River Shipyard
- Launched: 25 July 1942
- Commissioned: 12 September 1942
- Decommissioned: 31 January 1947
- Fate: Sold for scrap, 8 May 1972

General characteristics
- Class & type: Benson-class destroyer
- Displacement: 1,620 tons
- Length: 347 ft 9 in (105.99 m)
- Beam: 36 ft 1 in (11.00 m)
- Draught: 17 ft 4 in (5.28 m)
- Speed: 38
- Complement: 252
- Armament: 4 x 5 in (130 mm)/38 guns, 5 x 21 inch (533 mm) tt.

USS Champlin (DD-601) was a Benson-class destroyer in the United States Navy during World War II. She was the second ship named for Stephen Champlin.

Champlin was launched 25 July 1942 by Bethlehem Steel Company, Fore River Shipyard, Quincy, Massachusetts; sponsored by Mrs. A. C. Brendel; and commissioned 12 September 1942.

== Service history ==
=== Operations ===
After escorting a convoy to NS Argentia, Newfoundland, and another to the Panama Canal Zone, Champlin sailed from New York 11 December 1942 on her first convoy crossing to Casablanca, returning to New York 7 February 1943. She sailed again on 4 March guarding a convoy which was constantly shadowed by German submarines for 6 days after it passed the Azores on 12 March. On that day, a radar contact was made ahead of the convoy, and Champlin charged ahead to investigate, finding a submarine on the surface. She opened fire, and attempted to ram the enemy, which made a crash dive. Champlin hurled a pattern of depth charges into the swirl, and sank U-130 at position 37°10′N 20°21′W. As the convoy plodded east, Champlin and the other escorts fought a constant battle to protect it, but the convoy lost three merchantmen before reaching Casablanca. Champlin rescued every member of Wyoming's 127-man crew, as well as taking aboard two survivors from Molly Pitcher. The return convoy which arrived at Boston, Massachusetts 15 April was without incident.

Champlin sailed from New York 1 May 1943 with convoy UGS.4, composed primarily of LSTs which would participate in the upcoming invasions of southern Europe. This convoy called at Bermuda before arriving at Oran 26 May. She put to sea again to bring a convoy in from Gibraltar, then took part in training as well as conducting patrols in the western Mediterranean Sea. On 5 July, she cleared Oran for the invasion of Sicily, escorting a convoy to the transport area south of Scoglitti arriving 9 July. Leaving her charges, she sped ahead to join in the pre-assault bombardment the next day, during which she aided in driving off an air attack. While covering the landing and initial advances the same day, she answered the request from shore for a bombardment of the village of Camerina, so successfully that the enemy there surrendered.

Champlin left Sicily guarding a convoy for Oran and New York, arriving 4 August 1943. She made four more Atlantic crossings on convoy escort duty from New York to North Africa and the British Isles between 21 August 1943 and 11 March 1944. While undergoing refresher training in Casco Bay, Maine, in March 1944, Champlin was ordered out on a submarine hunt, joining an all-day operation 7 April. At 1632, she made contact and dropped deep-set depth charges, driving the submarine to the surface. Immediately, her guns opened fire and started a fire. Champlin rammed the stern of the submarine, and U-856 sank at position 40°18′N 62°18′W. Champlin's commanding officer, Commander John J. Shaffer III, was wounded by shrapnel during the attack and died the next morning despite emergency surgery.

After repairs to her bow, damaged in the ramming, Champlin left New York 21 April 1944 with a convoy for Oran. On 15 May, she reported at Naples for duty supporting the operations striving to break loose from the Anzio beachhead. She conducted patrols, escorted convoys, and provided fire support for minesweepers, and the Army ashore. Returning to Palermo, she sailed from that port 13 August for the invasion of southern France, in which she was assigned to patrol southwest of the transport area as a reserve fire support unit. On 18 August, she rescued a downed Army pilot from his raft, and on 19 August, she was fired upon by shore batteries as she steamed off Cannes. Next day she returned to the area to locate those batteries and destroy them, and the 21st, blocked the Gulf of Napoule while German E-boats thus trapped were destroyed. Continuing her fire support, she knocked out a bridge across the Var River near Nice upon Army request on 24 August, and a week later left the area to guard merchantmen bound for Oran. She continued to New York, escorting a division of battleships, and began a program of training and plane guard operations which lasted through the remainder of 1944.

=== Atlantic convoy escort ===
On 6 January 1945, Champlin returned to Atlantic convoy escort, sailing for Oran. On 30 January, she cleared Oran to rendezvous with the group bringing President Franklin D. Roosevelt to Malta, where he was to enplane for the Yalta Conference. She later escorted this same group back into the Atlantic, and on 20 February returned to Gibraltar for patrol and convoy escort duty in the western Mediterranean. On 22 April, she departed Oran for New York and preparations for deployment to the Pacific Ocean.

Champlin passed through the Panama Canal 4 June 1945, arrived at Pearl Harbor 10 July, and after training, sailed 24 July for the attack on Wake Island 1 August. Continuing to Okinawa, she arrived 12 August for local escort and patrol duty until 4 September, when she cleared on the first of two voyages to Japan in connection with occupation arrangements. On 31 October, she sailed from Okinawa with homeward-bound servicemen, calling to embark more at Saipan and Pearl Harbor. She disembarked her passengers at San Diego, California 21 to 24 November, then sailed for the east coast.

=== Reserve status ===
Champlin was placed in commission in reserve at Charleston, South Carolina 28 March 1946, and out of commission in reserve 31 January 1947. She was sold 8 May 1972 and scrapped.

== Awards ==
Champlin was awarded:

- American Campaign Medal
- European-African-Middle Eastern Campaign Medal
- Asiatic-Pacific Campaign Medal
- World War II Victory Medal
- Navy Occupation Medal with "ASIA" clasp

Champlin received six battle stars for World War II service.
