= USS Huse =

1943 Edsall-class destroyer escort

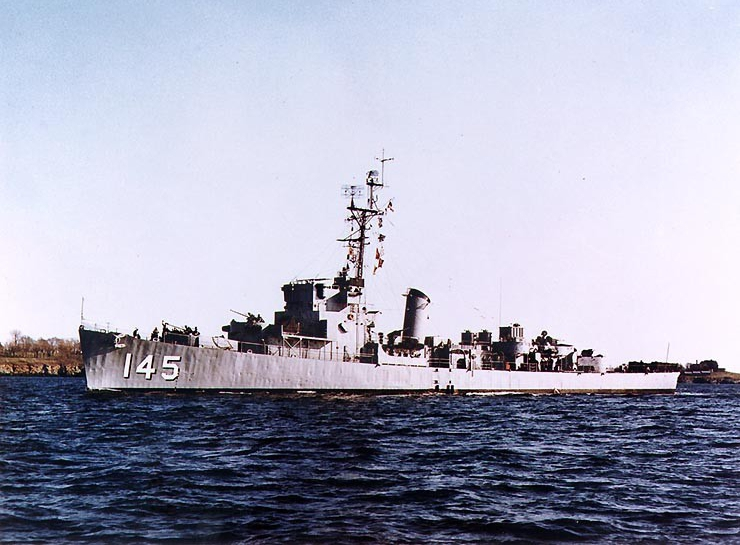
- Huse in harbor, c. 1950s.

History

United States
- Namesake: Harry McLaren Pinckney Huse
- Builder: Consolidated Steel Corporation, Orange, Texas
- Laid down: 11 January 1943
- Launched: 23 March 1943
- Commissioned: 30 August 1943
- Decommissioned: June 1965
- Stricken: August 1973
- Fate: Sold for scrapping in June 1974

General characteristics
- Class & type: Edsall-class destroyer escort
- Displacement: 1,253 tons standard; 1,590 tons full load
- Length: 306 feet (93.27 m)
- Beam: 36.58 feet (11.15 m)
- Draft: 10.42 full load feet (3.18 m)
- Propulsion: 4 FM diesel engines, 4 diesel-generators, 6,000 shp (4.5 MW), 2 screws
- Speed: 21 knots (39 km/h)
- Range: 9,100 nmi. at 12 knots; (17,000 km at 22 km/h)
- Complement: 8 officers, 201 enlisted
- Armament: 3 × single 3 in (76 mm)/50 guns; 1 × twin 40 mm AA guns; 8 × single 20 mm AA guns; 1 × triple 21 in (533 mm) torpedo tubes; 8 × depth charge projectors; 1 × depth charge projector (hedgehog); 2 × depth charge tracks

USS Huse (DE-145) was a U.S. Navy destroyer escort launched by Consolidated Steel Corp., Orange, Texas on 23 March 1943, during World War II. The ship was sponsored by Mrs. L. M. Humrichouse, daughter of Admiral Harry McLaren Pinckney Huse, whom the ship was named after and commissioned on 30 August 1943.

== World War II North Atlantic operations ==
Following a shakedown cruise off Bermuda, Huse returned to Charleston, South Carolina, 25 October 1943. She then moved to Norfolk, Virginia, for additional training before joining her first Atlantic convoy there 13 November. After escorting this convoy to Casablanca, she returned to New York on Christmas Day 1943. Following training exercises off Norfolk, Virginia, Huse escorted another convoy to Africa 25 January-11 February 1944, then, before returning home, engaged in antisubmarine patrol work off Gibraltar with ships of the Royal Navy.

Returning to New York 8 March, the ship was given a new assignment: to join escort carrier USS Croatan (CVE-25) antisubmarine group in the Atlantic. Sailing from Norfolk 24 March to search for U-boats, the ships detected 7 April.

== Hunting for German Submarines ==
On 7 April the group detected U-856 and the escorts remained in contact until it surfaced and was destroyed by gunfire from Huse and USS Champlin (DD-601). After a brief period at Bermuda, the group stood out to the search area again 12 April. Carrier aircraft and escort vessels came upon another submarine 26 April, and the destroyer escorts sank U-488.

Huse spent the period 11 May – 3 June at Brooklyn, New York, departing the latter date with Croatan to search for submarines. They had not long to wait, beginning attacks on a submerged submarine the morning of 11 June. Six depth charge and two hedgehog runs brought no confirmation of a sinking, but the persistent ships remained in the area searching until just after midnight 12 June, when radar revealed a surfaced submarine. The badly damaged U-490 was destroyed by gunfire. In the months that followed Huse continued to operate with the Croatan hunter-killer group, replenishing as necessary at Norfolk, Bermuda, or Casablanca. In addition, Huse rescued downed pilots from Croatan's air group on three separate occasions. She arrived in Brooklyn on 2 October 1944 for repairs and training, after which she conducted exercises in Chesapeake Bay and the Caribbean.

Huse joined Croatan for hunter-killer operations again 25 March 1945, and two of her sister ships scored a kill on Type VII U-880 on 16 April 1945 in the Atlantic. They continued to operate in northern waters out of Argentia, Newfoundland, until returning to New York 14 May 1945.

== End of War operations ==
The war against Germany over, Huse prepared to join the Pacific Fleet. She sailed 10 July 1945 for training exercises in the Caribbean, passing through the Panama Canal and arriving San Diego, California, 7 August 1945. During the voyage to Pearl Harbor, the ship learned of Japan's surrender 15 August. After various exercises in Hawaiian waters, the ship returned to Norfolk via San Diego and the Canal Zone 28 September 1945.

== Decommissioning ==
She arrived at Green Cove Springs, Florida on 19 January 1946 and decommissioned 27 March to join the Atlantic Reserve Fleet.

== Korean War Reactivation ==
Huse was recommissioned during the Korean War on 3 August 1951. After shakedown training in the Caribbean, she arrived Key West, Florida, 15 January 1952 to act as sonar-training ship. In May she steamed northward to take part in a cold-weather operation off Labrador. The ship then began regular training operations, based at Newport, Rhode Island, taking her to the Caribbean and Key West. This antisubmarine readiness training was maintained until July 1955 when the ship sailed to Norfolk to embark NROTC Midshipmen on a training cruise to Northern Europe. Huse returned to Newport 3 September 1955 and resumed antisubmarine operations. This continued until early 1957 when she made preparations to join the Navy task group operating off the Atlantic Missile Eastern Test Range.

During May 1957 Huse operated off Puerto Rico in connection with the launching of a Vanguard satellite test vehicle, and the subsequent nose cone recovery efforts. After further tactical exercises at Key West, she sailed in September for NATO exercises in Northern European waters, returning to Newport 21 October 1957. During 1958 and 1959, except for short cruises to the Caribbean and periodic overhaul, Huse remained in the Key West area on sonar-training operations.

Huse was assigned 'to the Naval Reserve Training program in March 1960, and for the next three months carried out training cruises with reservists from New York and Norfolk. She arrived New Orleans, her new home port, 6 July 1960 to begin reserve training cruises.

== Cuban Missile Crisis operations ==
In October 1962 Huse steamed to Florida to bolster Naval strength in support of the blockade.

== Decommissioning ==
Through 1963 into 1965 she continued to operate out of New Orleans in the Gulf of Mexico and the Caribbean performing training functions. In June 1965 Huse decommissioned and was placed in the Atlantic Reserve Fleet at Norfolk, Virginia. She was part of the Atlantic Reserve Fleet until stricken from the Naval Vessel Register in August 1973, and was sold for scrapping in June 1974.

== Awards ==
- European-African-Middle Eastern Campaign Medal with five battle stars
- World War II Victory Medal
- National Defense Service Medal with star
