= USS Frost =

Edsall-class destroyer escort (ship)

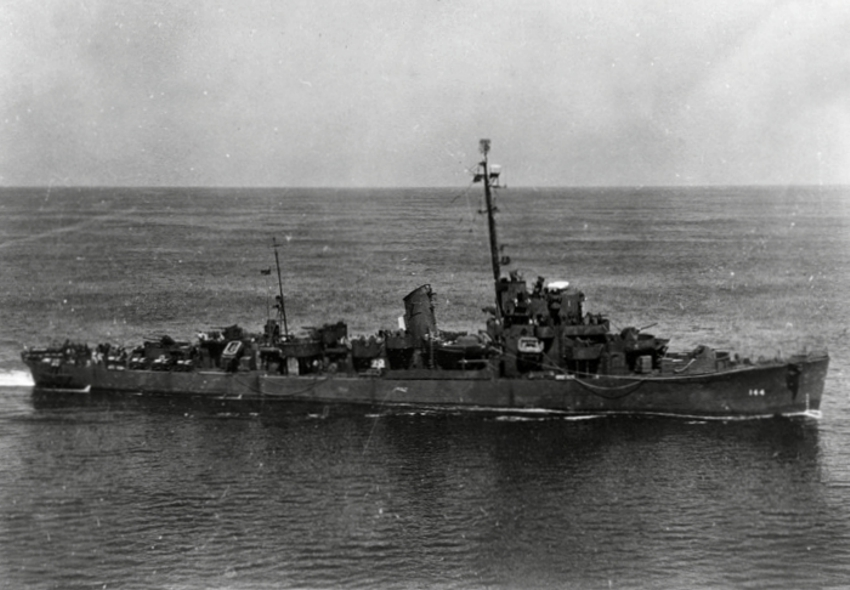

History

United States
- Namesake: Holloway Halstead Frost
- Builder: Consolidated Steel Corporation, Orange, Texas
- Laid down: 13 January 1943
- Launched: 21 March 1943
- Commissioned: 30 August 1943
- Decommissioned: 18 June 1946
- Stricken: 1 April 1965
- Honours and awards: 7 battle stars and the Presidential Unit Citation
- Fate: Sold 29 December 1966, scrapped

General characteristics
- Class & type: Edsall-class destroyer escort
- Displacement: 1,253 tons standard; 1,590 tons full load
- Length: 306 feet (93.27 m)
- Beam: 36.58 feet (11.15 m)
- Draft: 10.42 full load feet (3.18 m)
- Propulsion: 4 FM diesel engines, 4 diesel-generators, 6,000 shp (4.5 MW), 2 screws
- Speed: 21 knots (39 km/h)
- Range: 9,100 nmi. at 12 knots; (17,000 km at 22 km/h)
- Complement: 8 officers, 201 enlisted
- Armament: 3 × single 3 in (76 mm)/50 guns; 1 × twin 40 mm AA guns; 8 × single 20 mm AA guns; 1 × triple 21 in (533 mm) torpedo tubes; 8 × depth charge projectors; 1 × depth charge projector (hedgehog); 2 × depth charge tracks

USS Frost (DE-144) was an Edsall-class destroyer escort in service with the United States Navy from 1943 to 1946. She was scrapped in 1966.

== History ==
She was named in honor of Holloway Halstead Frost who was awarded the Navy Cross for his World War I service as aide to Commander, American Patrol Detachment, Atlantic Fleet, a billet in which he played a significant role in developing the tactics of surface and air forces in combined operations against submarines.

Frost (DE-144) was launched 21 March 1943 by Consolidated Steel Corp., Orange, Texas; sponsored by Mrs. Holloway H. Frost, widow of Commander Frost; and commissioned 30 August 1943.

=== Battle of the Atlantic ===
Frost made one convoy escort voyage to Casablanca between 11 November 1943 and 25 December before taking up her primary wartime assignments, coastal escort and operations with the USS Croatan (CVE-25) hunter-killer group.

Her first patrol with this group, from 24 March 1944 to 11 May, found her helping in the search for U-856, sunk on 7 April by other escorts of the group, and joining in sinking U-488 on 26 April, when she and three other escorts attacked after the submarine had been spotted by an aircraft from Croatan.

Again patrolling across the Atlantic to guard the movement of convoys to Casablanca between 3 June 1944 and 22 July, Frost made the initial contact with U-490 on 11 June. A lengthy attack followed, at the close of which the escorts drew the oxygen-exhausted submarine to the surface by feigning their departure from the area. She was sunk by gunfire, Frost taking 13 of her crew prisoner. A two-hour attack on 3 July, during which the target submarine attempted to torpedo Frost, resulted in the sinking of U-154.

During her third hunter-killer patrol, from 20 August 1944 to 2 October, Frost rescued survivors of USS Warrington (DD-383) who had capsized in a hurricane during the night of 13–14 September. Training at Guantanamo Bay and Bermuda preceded the next patrol, from 23 January 1945 to 7 February, during which her task group formed a part of the escort for USS Quincy (CA-71), carrying President Franklin D. Roosevelt toward the Yalta Conference. Additional training in Narragansett Bay and Casco Bay prepared her for her final antisubmarine patrol, during which she won the Presidential Unit Citation, for her high achievement in joining in sinking two submarines on the night of 15 – 16 April.

The first contact was made by USS Stanton (DE-247) just before midnight, and Frost joined in the attack which produced a violent underwater explosion at 0114 on 16 April. This was U-880. At 01:55, Frost picked up another target, and she and Stanton illuminated U-1235 and opened fire. They pressed home a depth charge attack when the submarine dived, and were rewarded at 04:10 with another great underwater explosion.

=== Post-war activity and decommissioning ===
Frost sailed from Boston, Massachusetts on 10 July 1945 for training in the Caribbean, and Pacific duty, reaching Pearl Harbor after the close of hostilities. She carried passengers back to San Diego, California, then sailed on to Norfolk, Virginia, and Green Cove Springs, Florida, where she was decommissioned and placed in reserve 18 June 1946. She was struck from the Navy list on 1 April 1965. On 29 December 1966 she was sold and scrapped.

== Awards ==
In addition to the Presidential Unit Citation, Frost received seven battle stars for World War II service.
