= USS Newell =

WWII US naval vessel

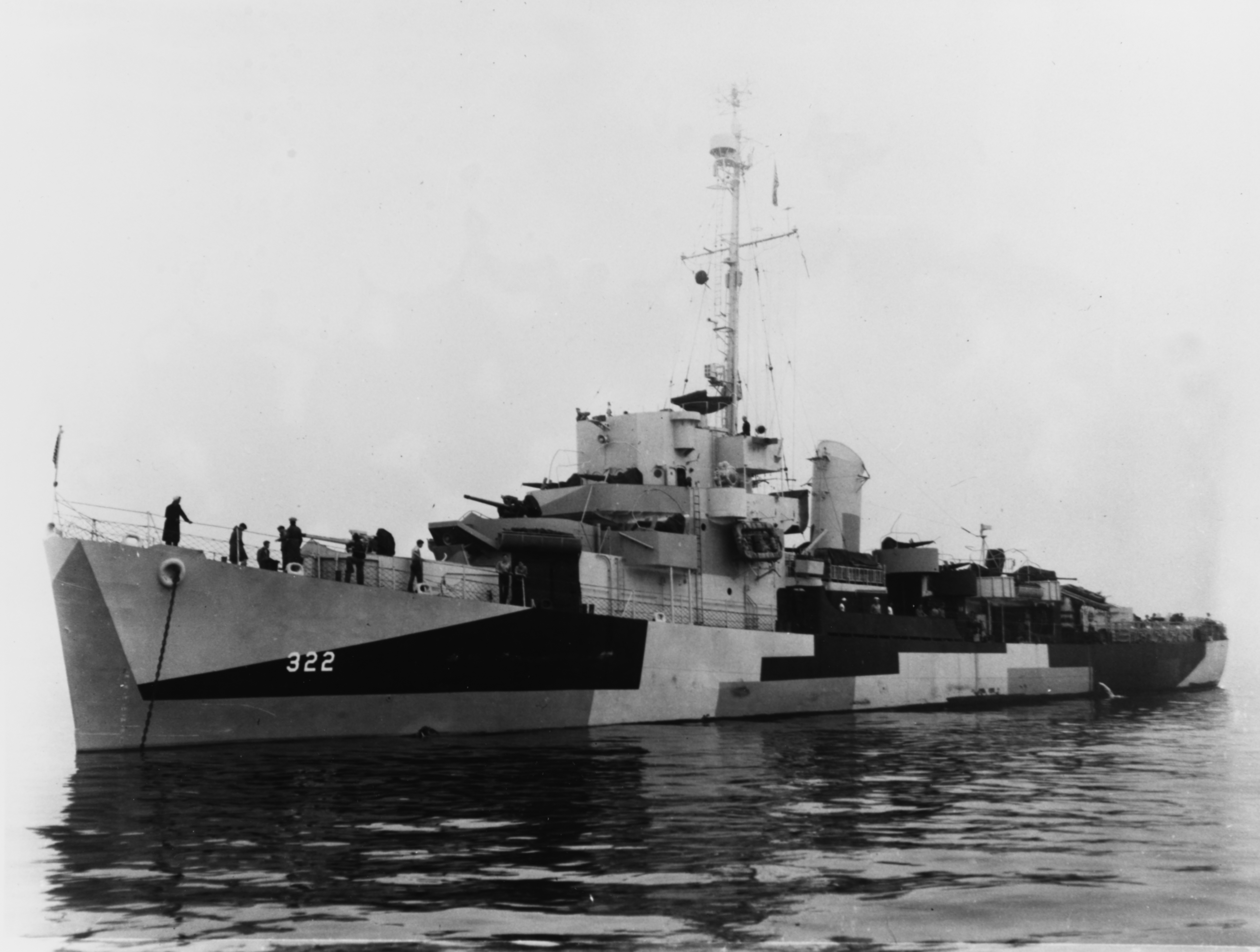
- USS Newell, June 1944

History

United States
- Namesake: Byron Bruce Newell
- Builder: Consolidated Steel Corporation, Orange, Texas
- Laid down: 5 April 1943
- Launched: 29 June 1943
- Sponsored by: Mrs. Byron B. Newell, widow of namesake
- Commissioned: 30 October 1943
- Decommissioned: 21 September 1968
- Reclassified: DER-322, 1 November 1956
- Stricken: 23 September 1968
- Fate: Sold for scrapping 15 December 1971

United States
- Name: USCGC Newell (WDE-422)
- Commissioned: 20 July 1951
- Decommissioned: 1 June 1954
- Fate: Returned to USN, 1 June 1954

General characteristics
- Class & type: Edsall-class destroyer escort
- Displacement: 1,253 tons standard; 1,590 tons full load
- Length: 306 feet (93.27 m)
- Beam: 36.58 feet (11.15 m)
- Draft: 10.42 full load feet (3.18 m)
- Propulsion: 4 FM diesel engines, 4 diesel-generators, 6,000 shp (4.5 MW), 2 screws
- Speed: 21 knots (39 km/h)
- Range: 9,100 nmi. at 12 knots; (17,000 km at 22 km/h)
- Complement: 8 officers, 201 enlisted
- Armament: 3 × single 3 in (76 mm)/50 guns; 1 × twin 40 mm AA guns; 8 × single 20 mm AA guns; 1 × triple 21 in (533 mm) torpedo tubes; 8 × depth charge projectors; 1 × depth charge projector (hedgehog); 2 × depth charge tracks

USS Newell (DE 322) was an Edsall-class destroyer escort built for the U.S. Navy during World War II. She served in the Atlantic and Pacific Oceans and provided destroyer escort protection against submarine and air attack for Navy vessels and convoys. Post war, she served in various capacities before being finally decommissioned.

== Namesake ==
Byron Bruce Newell was born on 29 November 1909 in Camp Hill, Alabama. He graduated from the United States Naval Academy on 5 June 1930. During the next decade he completed flight training and served on the USS New Mexico, USS Saratoga, USS Decatur, USS Kanawha and at the Naval Observatory, Washington. D.C. In August 1939 he reported to cargo ship Gold Star, home ported at Guam, before returning to Newport News for fitting out of the aircraft carrier USS Hornet. Soon after the Hornet commissioned 20 October 1941, the Empire of Japan attacked Pearl Harbor plunging the United States into World War II. On the morning of 26 October, during the Battle of the Santa Cruz Islands, a delayed action bomb exploded on the Hornets fantail killing him.

== Construction and commissioning ==
She was laid down 5 April 1943, by the Consolidated Steel Co., Orange, Texas; launched 29 June 1943; sponsored by Mrs. Byron B. Newell, wife of Lt. Comdr. Newell; and commissioned 30 October 1943.

== World War II North Atlantic operations ==
The new destroyer escort got under way 17 November 1943, for shakedown out of Bermuda. Newell then sailed, via Charleston, South Carolina., to Norfolk, Virginia, to train pre-commissioning crews for sister ships of her division. Two weeks, later USS Menges, USS Mosley, Newell, USS Pride, USS Falgout, and USS Lowe had assembled and the first convoy voyage began. The division safely escorted a convoy to Casablanca and back.

== Attacked by Luftwaffe planes ==
Her second transatlantic voyage took Newell to Bizerte. Two days past Gibraltar, during a twilight alert 20 April 1944, German planes hit the convoy with a torpedo attack. At 21:00, five planes were reported about six miles distant dead ahead. Four minutes later a terrific explosion occurred in the center of the convoy. At the same time three planes came in at about 40 feet above the water, cutting between Newell and USS Lansdale (DD-426). All starboard 20 millimeter guns and the 40 millimeter gun opened fire. Three of the 20s and the 40s were hitting the after plane repeatedly and it swerved off to port and probably exploded, as two German aviators were picked up in this area.

Gun number 3 observed planes coming in aft and opened up, immediately followed by the 40 millimeter gun. The planes were driven off to Newell's port.

== Rescuing survivors from the water ==
At 21:14, planes were sighted dead ahead. Guns 1 and 2 opened fire along with the forward 20 millimeter guns, blanketing the incoming planes which turned sharply northward. At 21:18 while Newell was closing the convoy, Lansdale broke in two and sank. Newell and Menges picked up 119 survivors. The ships then searched the area for additional survivors for three hours.

Many members of Newell's crew went over the side to bring on board survivors too weak to swim to the ship.

The ship with three other DE's then towed merchant ships to Algiers, where the survivors were discharged. The escorts then caught up with the convoy, which had proceeded to Bizerte. Newell had no ship's Doctor and two of the Pharmacist's Mates aboard were awarded the Legion of Merit for their courage and fortitude in treating the wounded that were recovered.

== German torpedoes sink ships ==
After ten days in Bizerte, the convoy started the long trek home. On the second night underway, Menges was torpedoed while tracking down a target, and on the next night Fechtler received a torpedo hit amidships, sinking her. Menges was towed to port and received another stern. The ship then made two more round trips to Bizerte and two to Oran.

== Assigned special duty ==
In February 1945, after the last of her six convoy trips, Newell reported to Norfolk, Virginia, for special duty in the Operational Training Command, Atlantic Fleet. She tested sonobuoys, determined the minimum speed possible for DEs while dropping various types of depth charges, and trained newly commissioned officers.

In April, Newell steamed to Florida, where she acted as escort and plane guard for a carrier training pilots. During this period, the ship recovered six downed pilots from the water. This assignment lasted until she sailed for New York on 3 June.

Newell sailed to Panama on 18 June, where she helped train submarines and remained on this duty through the summer and the Japanese surrender. On 20 October orders arrived sending the destroyer escort to Charleston, South Carolina., where she decommissioned 20 November 1945 and entered the Atlantic Reserve Fleet.

== Temporary duty with the Coast Guard ==
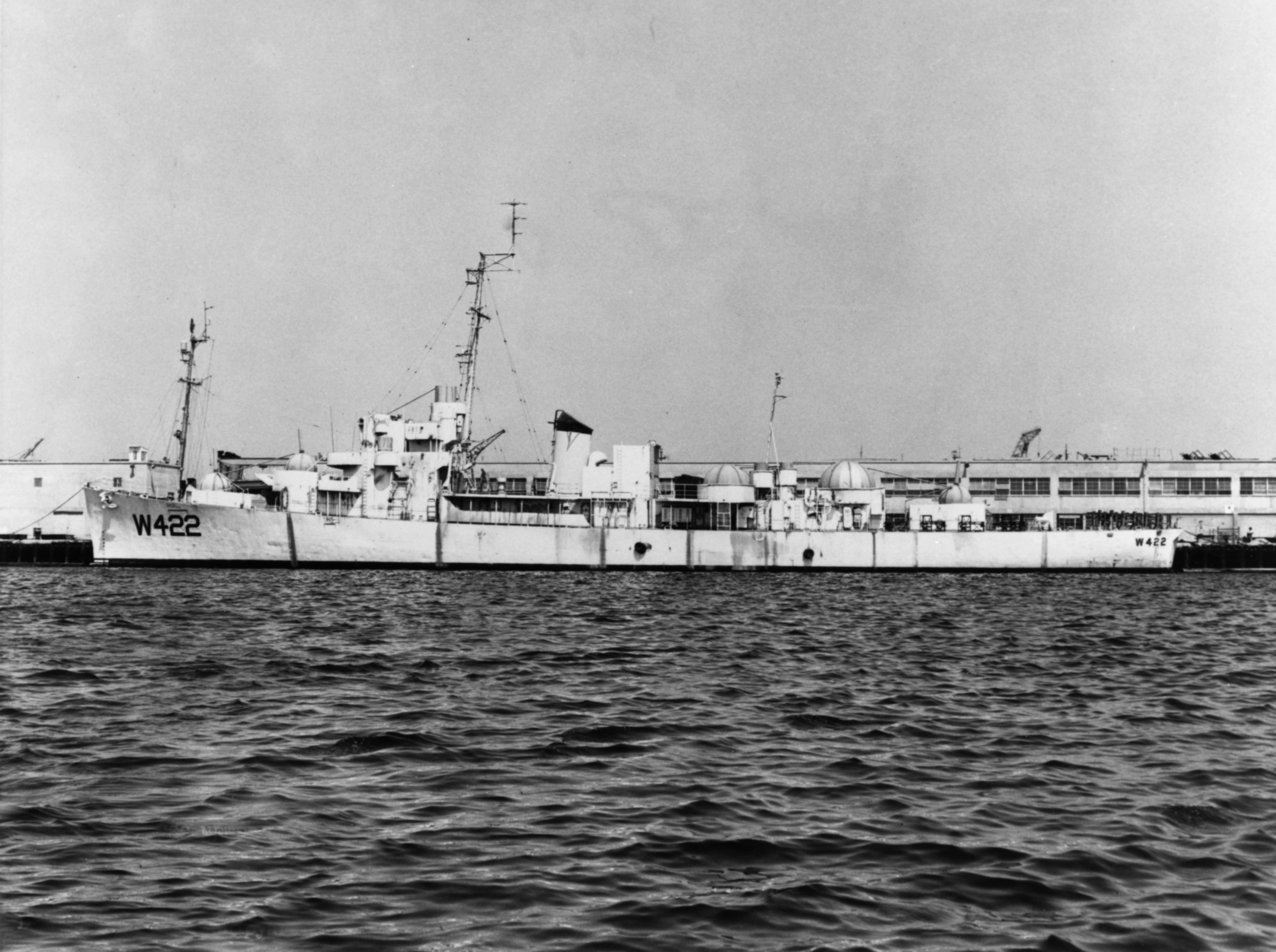
Newell with USCG markings in Long Beach prior to DER conversion, August 1956

Newell recommissioned in the U.S. Coast Guard 20 July 1951, steamed to Chesapeake Bay for shakedown, then transited the Panama Canal and proceeded to Mare Island Naval Shipyard for post activation overhaul and conversion to a WDE-type ship for ocean station search and rescue duty. Yard work completed, she steamed to Hawaii for operational training. She arrived on her first ocean station 27 April and for the next year and a half operated out of Pearl Harbor in the northwestern Pacific, ranging north to the Aleutians and west to Japan. Following first phase inactivation at Pearl Harbor the DE arrived Long Beach, California, 21 February 1954, decommissioned 31 March, and entered the Pacific Reserve Fleet.

== Converted as a radar picket ship ==
Fitted out with the latest electronic equipment, manned for the first time by a Navy crew and reclassified DER–322, Newell recommissioned at Long Beach 20 August 1957, and steamed to her new home port, Pearl Harbor. She soon took up station on the Pacific Barrier, the westward extension of the DEW Line. For over seven years she alternated duty at Pearl Harbor with patrols on the Pacific Barrier. During this period she also served in Operation Cosmos, the escort line for President Eisenhower's flight to the Far East in the spring of 1960; and provided weather surveillance for Johnston Island/Christmas Island nuclear tests. On 15 April 1965, Newell departed Pearl Harbor for her 28th Pacific Barrier patrol, the last picket ship to steam for the Pacific Barrier which Newell helped to formally terminate in a ceremony at Midway Island 1 May. The radar picket escort vessel then returned to Pearl Harbor to prepare for a WestPac deployment.

== Vietnam Crisis operations ==
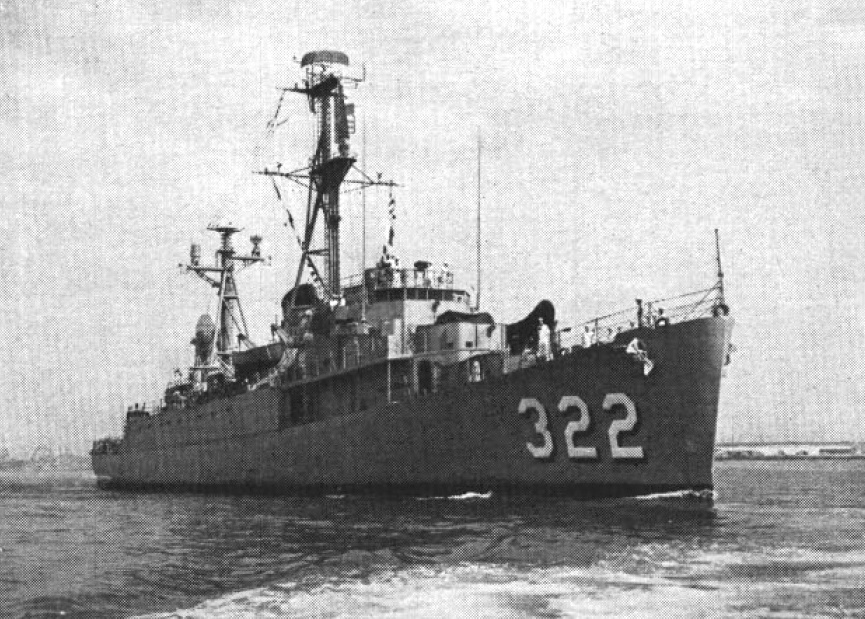
Newell after her DER-conversion.

Newell got underway 17 May for Vietnam via Guam, Subic Bay and Hong Kong. On her first Operation Market Time patrol, just north of the Mekong Delta, she searched many junks and several steel-hulled vessels to help stop infiltration of arms, ammunition, and supplies into South Vietnam to support Viet Cong forces. After upkeep at Subic Bay, her second patrol took her between Da Nang and Nha Trang. She worked closely with Vietnamese junk forces, Vietnamese Navy Sea Forces, U. S. Coast Guard cutters and other American Navy sea and air forces. On her third patrol, she operated between Vũng Tàu and An Thoi; and her guns destroyed a Viet Cong shelter on the Island of Phu Quoc. Her fourth and fifth patrols took her to the coast between Nha Trang and Da Nang. While on patrol off Viet Nam, she spent 155 days on station, detected 6,905 wooden hulls, inspected 2,472, and boarded 631. She detected 384 steel-hulled ships, inspected 67, and boarded 6.

On New Year's Day, 1966 Newell departed the "Market Time" area and sailed via Subic Bay and Japan, for home, arriving Pearl Harbor 3 February. After operations in Hawaiian waters, she headed back to the western Pacific 6 June. In addition to "Market Time" duty she supported smaller Coast Guard and Navy ships. On her third patrol she guarded the 17th parallel to stop infiltration from the North. She departed Vũng Tàu on the last day of 1966 and sailed via Japan for Hawaii, arriving Pearl Harbor 19 January 1967.

Underway 6 July for her third WestPac deployment. Newell spent much of July and August on Taiwan patrol before turning toward Vietnam on the 27th. She arrived "Market Time" Area 11 on 30 August, and departed on 19 September for Kaohsiung, to resume Taiwan patrol. She headed back toward the Vietnamese coast on the last day of October and relieved USS Lowe on Market Time Area II, 2 November. Newell departed Vietnam for the last time on the 28th, and steamed for Hawaii via Hong Kong; Subic Bay; Sydney, Australia; and Suva, Fiji Islands arriving Pearl Harbor 29 February 1968.

Newell was awarded the Armed Forces Expeditionary Medal for Vietnam service in June / July 1965. Newell also was awarded the Vietnam Service Medal for a number time periods of varying lengths, July to December 1965, June to December 1966 and December 1967 to January 1968.

== Final decommissioning ==
After operations in Hawaiian waters, Newell departed Pearl Harbor 6 August for WestPac, but three days later received orders to return for inactivation. She decommissioned at Pearl Harbor 21 September 1968, and was struck from the Naval Vessel Register 23 September 1968.

== Hollywood operations ==
Subsequently, the ship's engines were removed and her hull was used by Twentieth Century Fox Film Corp., 22 January to 15 April 1969 during the filming of motion picture Tora! Tora! Tora!.
