= USS Menges =

US naval vessel

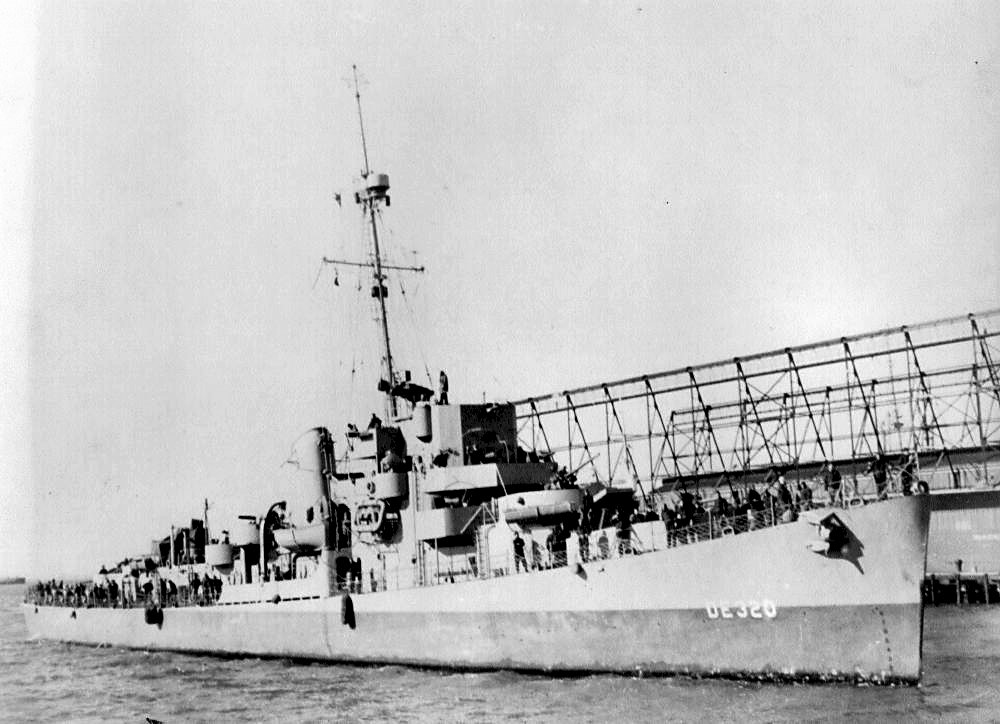
- USS Menges (DE-320)

History

United States
- Name: Menges
- Namesake: Herbert Hugo Menges
- Builder: Consolidated Steel Corporation, Orange, Texas
- Laid down: 22 March 1943
- Launched: 15 June 1943
- Commissioned: 26 October 1943
- Decommissioned: January 1947
- Stricken: 2 January 1971
- Fate: Sold for scrapping

General characteristics
- Class & type: Edsall-class destroyer escort
- Displacement: 1,253 tons standard; 1,590 tons full load
- Length: 306 ft (93.27 m)
- Beam: 36.58 ft (11.15 m)
- Draft: 10.42 ft (3.18 m) full load
- Propulsion: 4 × FM diesel engines; 4 × diesel-generators; 6,000 shp (4,500 kW); 2 × screws
- Speed: 21 knots (39 km/h; 24 mph)
- Range: 9,100 nmi (16,900 km; 10,500 mi) at 12 knots (22 km/h; 14 mph)
- Complement: 8 officers, 201 enlisted
- Armament: 3 × single 3 in (76 mm)/50 guns; 1 × twin 40 mm AA guns; 8 × single 20 mm AA guns; 1 × triple 21 in (533 mm) torpedo tubes; 8 × depth charge projectors; 1 × depth charge projector (hedgehog); 2 × depth charge tracks

USS Menges (DE-320) was an Edsall-class destroyer escort built for the United States Navy during World War II.

== Namesake ==
Herbert Hugo Menges was born on 20 January 1917 in Louisville, Kentucky. He enlisted in the Naval Reserve as seaman second class at Robertson, Missouri on 3 July 1939. He was appointed naval aviator on 24 July 1940, and assigned to Squadron 6 on USS Enterprise on 28 November 1940. He was killed during the Attack on Pearl Harbor on 7 December 1941.

== History ==
=== World War II ===
Menges was laid down by Consolidated Steel Corporation of Orange, Texas on 22 March 1943; launched 15 June 1943, sponsored by Mrs. Charles Menges, mother of the late Ensign Menges; and commissioned 26 October 1943. After shakedown off Bermuda, Menges spent January 1944 on "schoolship" duty in the lower Chesapeake Bay. On 26 January she got underway from Norfolk, Virginia for New York City, and on 31 January departed for Europe, on the first three-month-long deployment escorting convoys. On the night of 20 April her convoy, UGS 38, while off the coast of Algiers en route to the east coast of the U.S., was attacked by 30 German torpedo bombers. After shooting down one of the planes, Menges rescued 137 survivors of USS Lansdale, which had been sunk by a torpedo, and two German aircrew.

==== Torpedo attack ====
On 3 May 1944, at 0118 hours, Menges was 15½ miles astern of the convoy chasing down a radar contact when she was hit by a G7es acoustic torpedo from U-371 (which was in turn sunk the next day by USS Joseph E. Campbell, USS Pride and other warships). The explosion was so violent that the aft third of the ship was destroyed, killing 31 men and wounding 25. However, Commander McCabe refused to give the order to abandon ship as long as there was chance of saving her. In addition, several of the crew members heroically jumped astride torpedoes loosened in the blast to disarm them. Menges, thanks to such creditable action, remained afloat.

Four hours later Menges was taken in tow by HMS Aspirant, and later on 3 May reached Bougie, Algeria to disembark her dead and wounded. On 23 June, the temporarily repaired Menges got underway from Oran, under tow by USS Carib, bound for New York, and arrived 22 July. From 14 to 31 August the stern of USS Holder, whose forward two-thirds had been blown away by a torpedo in the Mediterranean Sea on 11 April, was welded to the remaining two-thirds of Menges. The "new" ship came out of drydock at the Brooklyn Navy Yard for shakedown from 26 September to 20 October in Casco Bay, Maine.

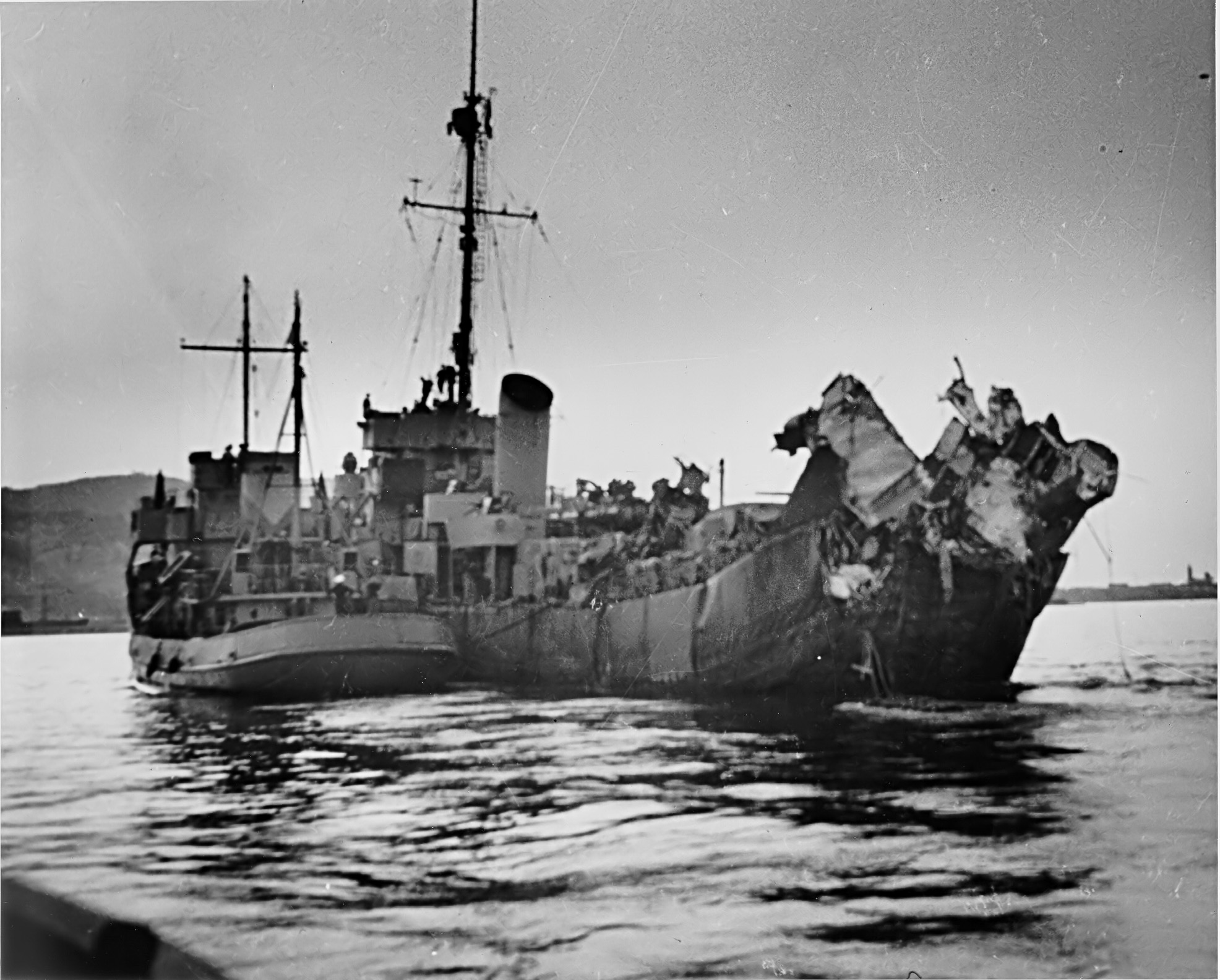
The severely damaged Menges under tow.

==== Convoy duty ====
On 15 November Menges steamed in convoy CU 47 from New York for Europe, arriving Plymouth, England on 26 November. She spent the next few months again on Atlantic convoy duty before joining USS Pride, USS Mosley, and USS Lowe late in February 1945 to form the only hunter-killer group in the North Atlantic to be manned completely by Coast Guard personnel. On 18 March Menges assisted Lowe in sinking U-866, their first target. She continued antisubmarine sweep and patrol operations until the German surrender on 7 May.

==== Coast guard service ====
On 30 May she escorted her last convoy to Europe, CU 73, arriving Cheshire, England on 8 June. Menges arrived back in New York on 21 June for duty as a training ship for the United States Coast Guard Academy, with two cadet cruises to the West Indies before arriving New London, Connecticut on 7 September. Three days later she departed for the Cape Cod area, arriving Boston, Massachusetts on 17 September. By Navy Day, 27 October, Menges was moored at Fall River, below Boston.

Menges received two battle stars for her World War II service.

=== Retirement ===
The escort ship moved on to Green Cove Springs, Florida for assignment in March 1946 to the 16th (Inactive Reserve) Fleet. Menges decommissioned in January 1947 and entered the berthing area in the St. Johns River to spend the next 15 years there in reserve. By 1 January 1962 she was berthed at Orange, Texas in the Atlantic Reserve Fleet, where she remained until stricken from the Naval Vessel Register 2 January 1971, the ship was sold for scrapping on 10 April 1972.
