= USS Sustain (AM-119) =

Minesweeper of the United States Navy

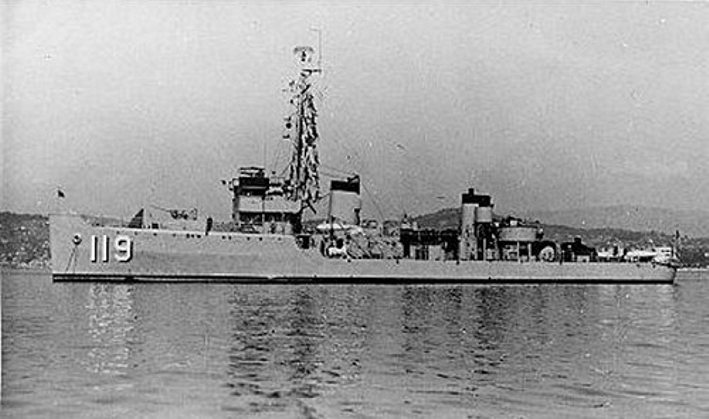

History

United States
- Name: USS Sustain (AM-119)
- Builder: American Ship Building Company, Cleveland, Ohio
- Laid down: 17 November 1941
- Launched: 23 June 1942
- Commissioned: 9 November 1942
- Decommissioned: 17 June 1946
- Recommissioned: 14 January 1952
- Decommissioned: 9 October 1954
- Reclassified: MSF-119, 7 February 1955
- Reclassified: MMC-2, 31 October 1958
- Stricken: 1 October 1959
- Honours and awards: 8 battle stars (World War II)
- Fate: Transferred to Norway, 1 October 1959

History

Norway
- Name: HNoMS Tyr (N47)
- Acquired: 1 October 1959
- Fate: unknown

General characteristics
- Class & type: Auk-class minesweeper
- Displacement: 890 long tons (904 t)
- Length: 221 ft 3 in (67.44 m)
- Beam: 32 ft (9.8 m)
- Draft: 10 ft 9 in (3.28 m)
- Speed: 18 knots (33 km/h; 21 mph)
- Complement: 100 officers and enlisted
- Armament: 1 × 3"/50 caliber gun; 2 × 40 mm guns

USS Sustain (AM-119) was an Auk-class minesweeper acquired by the United States Navy for the dangerous task of removing mines from minefields laid in the water to prevent ships from passing.

Sustain was laid down on 17 November 1941 by the American Ship Building Company, Cleveland, Ohio; launched on 23 June 1942; sponsored by Mrs. L. L. Dean; and commissioned on 9 November 1942.

Sustain departed Cleveland, Ohio on 15 November and headed for Quebec to await the forming of a convoy which she was to escort. The convoy sailed on the 25th for Halifax, Nova Scotia. She departed there on 4 December 1942 with another convoy bound for Boston. After a six-week yard period, the minesweeper performed coastal convoy duty until 19 March 1943. On that date, Sustain got underway with a Bermuda-bound convoy which, upon arrival, joined other ships there destined for North Africa.

== World War II North African operations ==
Sustain and the convoy stood out of port on 27 March and arrived at Oran, Algeria, on 13 April. The ship then began sweeping and patrol duty at the port of Ténès which lasted until 23 May. She returned to Oran and operated along the Algerian coast until 27 June when she joined a convoy for Tunis which arrived there two days later. Ten days were spent in final preparations for the landings on Sicily. The invasion fleet sortied on 8 July and, on the afternoon of the next day, Sustain and Steady were detached to proceed ahead of it. Late that evening, they began sweeping approach channels and clearing a transport anchorage off the prospective landing beaches for the invasion armada which landed troops at Gela on the 10th. She swept mines and patrolled off the beaches until the end of the month when she returned to Bizerte. She picked up a resupply convoy there and with other ships of Mine Squadron (MinRon) 6, escorted it to Palermo, where she swept and patrolled until 23 August when the squadron returned to Algeria.

== Participating in the invasion of Italy ==
Sustain stood out of Mers El Kébir on 5 September with Task Force (TF) 81 with a convoy en route to the Gulf of Salerno. She streamed her sweep gear on the evening of the 8th to clear the way for the landing of the Allied 5th Army the next morning. The remainder of September and the early part of October were spent in sweeping operations and "E-boat" patrols, occasionally broken by escort duty between Bizerte and Salerno. The latter part of October was spent at Bizerte undergoing repair. She then escorted convoys between Oran, Bizerte, Palermo, and Naples, Italy until the end of the year.

Sustain was at Naples in mid-January 1944 and attached to an invasion fleet to participate in "Operation Shingle", the amphibious landing of Allied forces 60 miles behind the German lines in the Anzio-Nettuno area. The morning of the landing, 22 January, she escorted landing craft to the beach. She then began anti-submarine and "E-boat" patrol duty outside the harbor. On 2 February, she escorted a convoy to Bizerte. On the 23rd, she joined another Anzio-bound convoy and, upon arrival there, resumed her former duties until 7 March. Sustain returned to Oran and was assigned to special convoy escort duty.

=== Attacked by German submarine ===
Sustain was on such duty on 4 May when an enemy submarine was sighted by the French ship Sénégalais. She closed the scene but not before this submarine scored a torpedo hit on Sénégalais. In concert with Pride, Joseph E. Campbell, and HMS Blankney, the submarine U-371 was sunk. Sustain rescued 30 survivors from the submarine. She continued escort duty until 23 June when she rejoined her squadron at Naples. She swept the coastal channels between Naples and Anzio and at Salerno before returning to Bizerte.

== Participating in Operation Dragoon ==
Sustain joined the largest invasion fleet ever assembled in the Mediterranean on 12 August to participate in "Operation Dragoon", the invasion of southern France. She entered the transport area at St. Raphael in early morning on 15 August and patrolled that area as the assault waves were landed. Sustain continued on patrol and sweeping duty until 4 October at which time she returned to Bizerte via Naples, Italy.

Sustain and her squadron joined a convoy of LST's and LCI's that sailed for the United States on 24 November. She arrived at Norfolk, Virginia, on 11 December 1944 and was refitted for duty in the Pacific.

== Pacific Ocean operations ==
Sustain put to sea on 15 February 1945 en route to the Pacific war zone. She arrived at Coco Solo on the 22nd; transited the canal on the 25th; and arrived at Pearl Harbor with the other ships of MinRon 6 on 19 March. The ship received a final overhaul in the yard. At this time air search radar was installed. Sustain sailed for Eniwetok on 24 April as a convoy escort and thence to Guam.

Sustain arrived at Apra Harbor, Guam, on 8 May and remained there until the end of the month when she sailed for Okinawa, arriving at Kerama Retto on 3 June and was assigned to antisubmarine patrol the remainder of the month. On 8 July, the minesweeper was detailed to sweep areas in the East China Sea. This duty lasted until 30 August when her area of operations was changed to Kagoshima, Kyūshū, to clear the bay so that occupation troops could be landed. After returning to Okinawa on 9 September for logistics, Sustain was ordered to sweep Bungo Suido. She swept that area from 24 September until 2 November when she steamed to Sasebo, Japan. During November and December, she swept mines in the East China Sea, off Takao, Formosa, and the southwest coast of that island. When that was completed, the ship sailed for Shanghai. She remained there from 23 December 1945 until 3 January 1946 when she set sail for the United States, via Eniwetok and Pearl Harbor.

== Post-World War II activity ==
Sustain was given a pre-inactivation overhaul at San Diego after her return in February and on 17 June 1946 was placed in reserve, out of commission.

Sustain was placed in commission again on 14 January 1952 and in April, she was assigned to the Atlantic Fleet for duty. She served that fleet along the U.S. East Coast and in the Mediterranean until 9 October 1954 when she was placed in reserve, in commission. On 2 February 1955, she was placed in reserve, out of commission at Green Cove Springs, Florida. On 5 February 1955, Sustain was reclassified from AM-119 to MSF-119, Minesweeper Fleet (steel-hulled). She was again redesignated MMC-2 in 1958.

== Decommissioning ==
Sustain was struck from the Navy List on 1 October 1959 and transferred to Norway on the same date.

== Awards ==
Sustain received eight battle stars for World War II service.
