= USS Mosley =

WWII US naval vessel

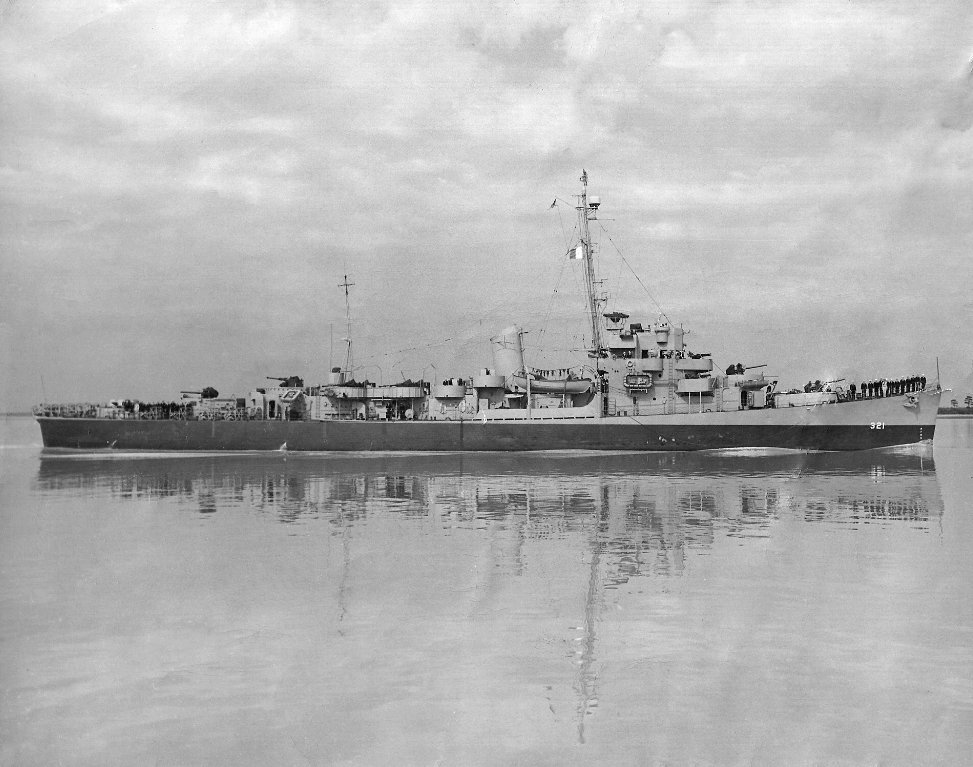
- USS Mosley

History

United States
- Namesake: Walter Harold Mosley
- Builder: Consolidated Steel Corporation, Orange, Texas
- Laid down: 6 April 1943
- Launched: 26 June 1943
- Commissioned: 30 October 1943
- Decommissioned: 15 March 1946
- Stricken: 2 January 1971
- Fate: Sold for scrapping 22 August 1973

General characteristics
- Class & type: Edsall-class destroyer escort
- Displacement: 1,253 tons standard; 1,590 tons full load
- Length: 306 feet (93.27 m)
- Beam: 36.58 feet (11.15 m)
- Draft: 10.42 full load feet (3.18 m)
- Propulsion: 4 FM diesel engines, 4 diesel-generators, 6,000 shp (4.5 MW), 2 screws
- Speed: 21 knots (39 km/h)
- Range: 9,100 nmi. at 12 knots; (17,000 km at 22 km/h)
- Complement: 8 officers, 201 enlisted
- Armament: 3 × single 3 in (76 mm)/50 guns; 1 × twin 40 mm AA guns; 8 × single 20 mm AA guns; 1 × triple 21 in (533 mm) torpedo tubes; 8 × depth charge projectors; 1 × depth charge projector (hedgehog); 2 × depth charge tracks

USS Mosley (DE 321) was an Edsall-class destroyer escort built for the U.S. Navy during World War II. She served in the Atlantic Ocean the Pacific Ocean and provided destroyer escort protection against submarine and air attack for Navy vessels and convoys.

== Namesake ==
Walter Harold Mosley was born on 17 January 1916 in Waco, Texas. He enlisted in the Navy 12 February 1940. He was appointed an aviation cadet on 21 June 1940. He completed flight training at Pensacola, Florida, and was commissioned as an ensign on 11 March 1941. Assigned to Patrol Squadron 22, he was based at Ford Field during the Japanese Attack on Pearl Harbor 7 December. In January 1942, he flew with his squadron to Darwin, Australia, to support the Allied attempt to halt the Japanese advance through Southeast Asia. Based on USS William B. Preston, he flew patrols north of Australia into the Java Sea and surrounding waters plotting the movements of the Japanese.

As copilot of a PBY-5, he departed for a patrol south of Amboina, Moluccas on 19 February. With Lt. Thomas H. Moorer as pilot, the patrol plane spotted a merchant ship off Melville Island, Australia, and turned to investigate. About 09:20, nine Japanese fighters, part of a 70 plane force en route to bomb Darwin, Australia, jumped the PBY. Soon the plane was in flames, its port engine out and fuel streaming along the fuselage. Despite the attacking fighters, Moorer and Mosley landed the plane. In Moorer's words, Mosley assisted by handling the throttle "although dazed and bleeding profusely from a wound in the head." Florence D., an American merchant ship carrying ammunition to the Philippines, rescued the crew. Later that day, Japanese carrier planes sunk the unarmed ship with 500 pound bombs. Survivors, including Mosley, made Bathurst Island in two lifeboats about midnight and an RAAF patrol plane spotted them on the 21st. The next morning, HMAS Warrnambool (J202), an Australian subchaser, rescued them and carried them to Darwin on 23 February.

Early in March, Mosley returned to the United States where he joined VP-44 for operations out of Pearl Harbor. Late in May, he flew search patrols out of Midway Island in anticipation of a Japanese attack. During the first air attack against the island 4 June, Mosley was serving as copilot in 44-P-12 PBY-5A when it was attacked by two Japanese seaplanes and the bomber was shot down in flames. He was posthumously awarded the Silver Star.

== Construction and commissioning ==
She was laid down by Consolidated Steel Corporation of Orange, Texas, 6 April 1943; launched 26 June 1943; by Mrs. A. G. Mosley; and commissioned at Orange 30 October 1943.

== World War II North Atlantic operations ==
After shakedown off Bermuda, Mosley escorted a convoy out of Norfolk, Virginia, to Texas Gulf ports and back. Then, on 28 January 1944, she sailed to New York for escort duty with CortDiv 46. Between 31 January and 18 March 1944, she screened a UGS GUS convoy to north Africa and back; then, following anti-submarine warfare (ASW) training off Block Island, she reached Norfolk 1 April for further escort duty.

== Under attack by the Luftwaffe ==
Three days later, Mosley sailed with convoy UGS 38 bound for the Mediterranean. The ships passed Gibraltar 18 April, and then closed the coast of North Africa. As the convoy hugged the Algerian coast on 20 April, the ships came under an intensive Luftwaffe attack shortly after 2100. Junkers and Heinkel bombers struck in three waves. The first attack blew the troop-loaded merchantman SS Paul Hamilton out of the water, killing 580 men; the next wave hit two more merchant ships; and the final strike sank screening escort USS Lansdale with a single torpedo which split open the unlucky destroyer. Mosley laid covering smoke and opened up with antiaircraft fire during the strikes. Her guns splashed one Ju 88 and damaged another German bomber during the first strike.

== Under attack by German submarines ==
Mosley reached Bizerte, Tunisia on 22 April, then departed 1 May as escort for westbound GUS 38. Two days later, the convoy ran into trouble from lurking U-boats. Early on 3 May, Menges, a sister escort, detected U-371 astern of the convoy. As she closed to attack the German submarine, Menges was damaged by an acoustic torpedo. The sub escaped, only to be hunted down and destroyed by searching escorts the next day. As the convoy neared Gibraltar early 5 May, a second U-boat, U-967, harassed the screen. A single torpedo fatally damaged Fechteler. Mosley, after aiding the search for the elusive sub, rejoined the convoy later that day in the Straits of Gibraltar. She reached New York via Norfolk 22 May.

Mosley resumed convoy escort duty out of Norfolk, Virginia on 11 June. During the next 8 months, she completed four round-trips to North Africa and back. She made two runs to Bizerte and two to Oran, returning from her final Mediterranean convoy on 11 February 1945. After completing availability at New York, she joined a hunter-killer group at New London, Connecticut, 23 February.

== Sinking of German Submarine U-866 ==
Designated Task Group 22.14, Mosley and sister escorts, Pride, Menges, and Lowe trained off Block Island before steaming to Casco Bay on 4 March. The next day, they sailed to seek out and destroy an enemy submarine reported off Newfoundland, north of Flemish Cap. They made first contact on 13 March, and during the next 5 days carried out persistent search-and-destroy operations. On 18 March in waters west of treacherous Sable Island, day-long hedgehog and depth charge attacks brought "air bubbles, wreckage, and large quantities of oil" to the surface. A violent underwater explosion at 1622 marked the end of U-866, and the hunter killer group returned to Casco Bay on 20 March.

Mosley resumed ASW patrols in the Gulf of Maine on 24 March; then, until 4 April, she searched the stormy North Atlantic south and west of Flemish Cap. On 10 April, TG 22.14 rendezvoused at sea with a hunter-killer group built around USS Mission Bay and began barrier patrols along the 30th meridian north of latitude 48°30'. One of four CVE-DE groups, Mission Bay and her escorts comprised the northern force of the First Barrier Force. Divided into two barrier forces, the hunter-killer groups formed two lines of defense against a harassing blitz by German snorkel submarines dubbed Group "Seewolf".

== Sinking of German Submarines U-1235 and U-880 ==
Between 10 and 16 April, Mosley carried out 10-mile patrols in her assigned barrier station. During the night of 15 and 16 April, escorts to the south of her blasted U-1235 and U-880 in heavy seas. Her war diary on 16 April at 02:00 noted: "Lots of fun going on in southern part of barrier." That evening, the barrier patrols shifted westward to the 38th meridian and Mosley resumed patrols across the 45th parallel.

== Hunting German Submarines U-805 and U-518 ==
Late on 21 April, Mosley, in company with Lowe and J.R.Y. Blakely made radar contact with a surfaced submarine, probably U-805. The contact disappeared at a range of 9,100 yards (8,300 m), and Mosley closed for attack. Bucking "short and steep" seas, Mosley fired hedgehogs, but without effect. The three escorts continued hedgehog and creeper attacks against the deep-running submarine. Shortly after 02:00 on 22 April, soundmen detected underwater explosions which were probably evasive tactics of the U-boat. At about the same time as Mosley first made contact, escorts Carter and Neal A. Scott attacked and sank U-518 some 100 miles southward along the barrier.

== End-of-War activity ==
The hunter-killer group returned to Argentia on 27 April for replenishment; then, Mosley resumed surface barrier patrols 2 May. She was patrolling the North Atlantic about 300 miles south of Cape Race, Newfoundland, as President Truman announced the German surrender on 8 May. On 14 May, she returned to New York, where she remained until 16 June, "removing the stains of North Atlantic duty." She sailed to Port Everglades, Florida, and on 25 June, began duty with the Atlantic Fleet's Antisubmarine Development Detachment, she carried out ASW test and development exercises with submarines and other escorts until 7 September. After completing overhaul at Charleston, South Carolina, she steamed to Green Cove Springs, Florida on 3 November.

== Post-War decommissioning ==
Mosley was decommissioned at Green Cove Springs on 15 March 1946, and entered the Atlantic Reserve Fleet. After that time she remained in reserve, and in 1969 was berthed with the Atlantic Inactive Fleet at Orange, Texas. She was struck from the Navy List on 2 January 1971 and was sold for scrap on 22 August 1973.

== Awards ==
- American Campaign Medal with one battle star
- European-African-Middle Eastern Campaign Medal with one battle star
- World War II Victory Medal
