= Lake Farmingdale (1919 ship) =

American steel-hulled cargo ship

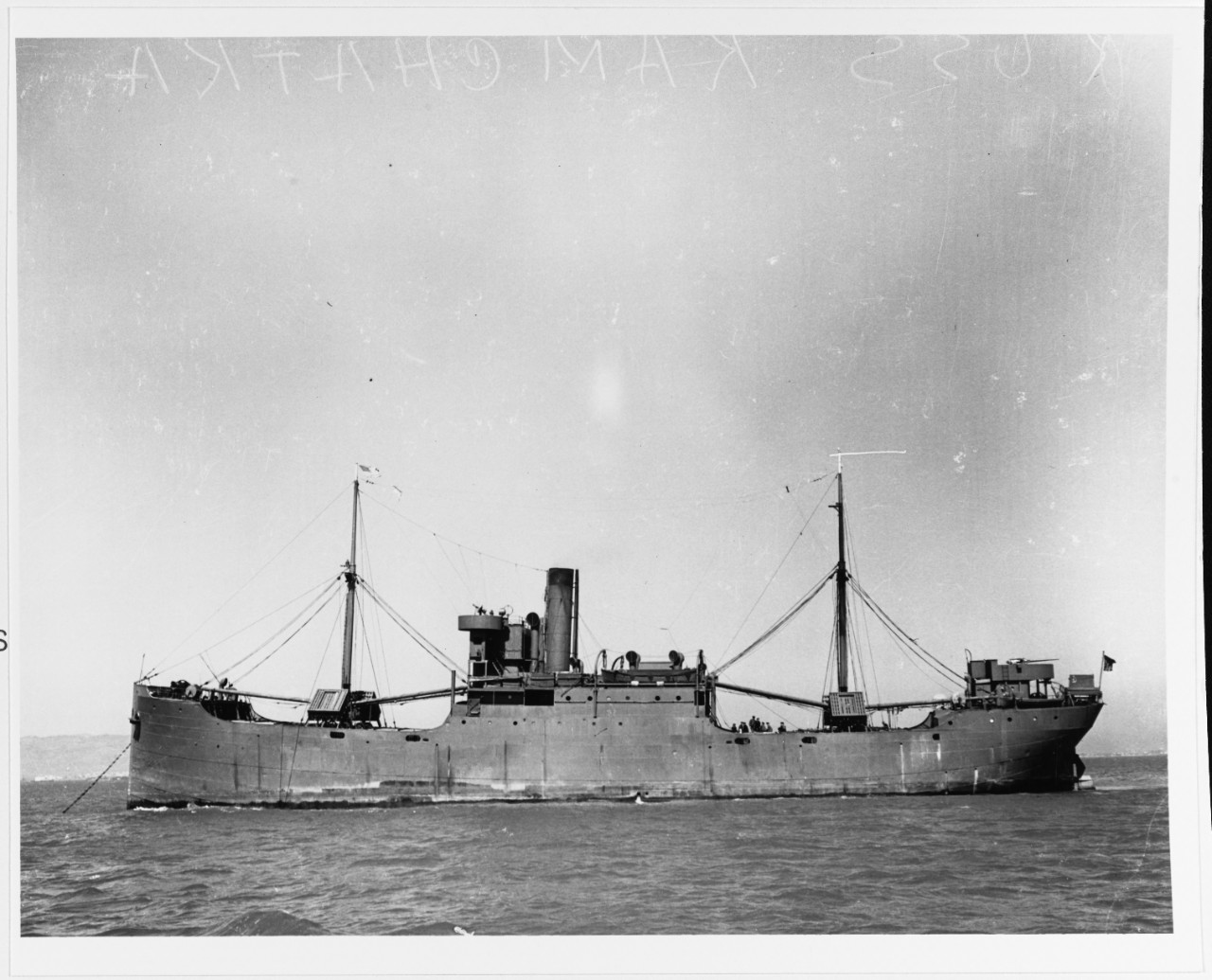
- Soviet freighter Kamchatka, launched as Lake Filson, a sister ship of Lake Farmingdale

History

United States
- Name: Lake Farmingdale (1919–1925); Florence D (1925–1942)
- Owner: United States Shipping Board (1919–1925); Cadwallader-Gibson Lumber Company (1925–1942)
- Builder: Superior Shipbuilding Company
- Launched: 30 April 1919
- Identification: Official number: 218471; Radio call sign: KIPZ (1920)
- Fate: Sunk by Japanese aircraft bombs, 19 February 1942

General characteristics
- Type: Design 1099 cargo ship
- Tonnage: 2,606 GRT; 1,612 NRT; 4,155 DWT
- Length: 251 ft (77 m)
- Beam: 43 ft 6 in (13.26 m)
- Draft: 24 ft 2 in (7.37 m)
- Installed power: 1,500 ihp (1,100 kW)
- Propulsion: Oil-fired triple-expansion steam engine
- Speed: 9.5 knots

The steamship Lake Farmingdale was steel-hulled freighter built for the United States Shipping Board in 1919. She spent most of her career in Southeast Asia as a passenger-cargo ship for the Pacific Mail Steamship Company, and, renamed Florence D., hauling timber for the Cadwallader-Gibson Lumber Company in the Philippines. She was sunk on 19 February 1942 by Japanese carrier aircraft while attempting to deliver arms and supplies to General Douglas MacArthur's forces in the Philippines.

== Construction and characteristics ==
When the United States entered World War I in April 1917, neither it nor any Allied power had shipping capacity to carry the two million Americans who sailed for Europe, much less all their accompanying armament and supplies. What shipping did exist in the Atlantic was pared back by Germany's U-boats, which sank almost 5,000 ships during the war. The United States Shipping Board and its wholly owned Emergency Fleet Corporation mass-produced ships to a few standard designs to "build a bridge across the ocean." Lake Farmingdale was one of those ships.

Lake Farmingdale was built to the Shipping Board's standard Design 1099. She was built of welded steel plates. She was 251 feet (77 m) long between perpendiculars, with a beam of 43 feet 6 inches (13.26 m), and a depth of hold of 28 feet 2 inches (8.59 m). Her fully loaded draft was just over 24 feet (7.3 m). Deadweight tonnage, the weight of cargo which could be carried, was 4,155 tons. Gross register tonnage was 2,643, while her net register tonnage was 1,634.

Lake Farmingdale had a single propeller which was driven by a single triple-expansion steam engine with 1,500 indicated horsepower (1,100 kW). This engine had high, medium, and low pressure cylinders with diameters of 21 inches, 35 inches, and 59 inches respectively, with a stroke of 42 inches. Steam was provided by two boilers, which were oil-fired. The ship was capable of reaching 9.5 knots (17.6 km/h; 10.9 mph). Her fuel tanks could hold 708 tons of oil, giving her a steaming range of just over 8,000 miles.

She had two cargo holds, each of which had two hatches. Each hold was serviced by four cargo booms, each of which had its own winch. The heaviest load that could be winched aboard was 4 tons. Lake Farmingdale had an effective cargo capacity of 166,806 cubic feet (4,723.4 m^{3}) for baled cargo and 180,033 ft^{3} (5,098.0 m^{3}) for grain.

Lake Farmingdale was built by the Superior Shipbuilding Company, a unit of the American Shipbuilding Company, at its Superior, Wisconsin shipyard. She was launched on 30 April 1919 and delivered to the Shipping Board in July 1919. Her original cost was $783,923.45.

== Service history ==
=== United States Shipping Board (1919–1925) ===
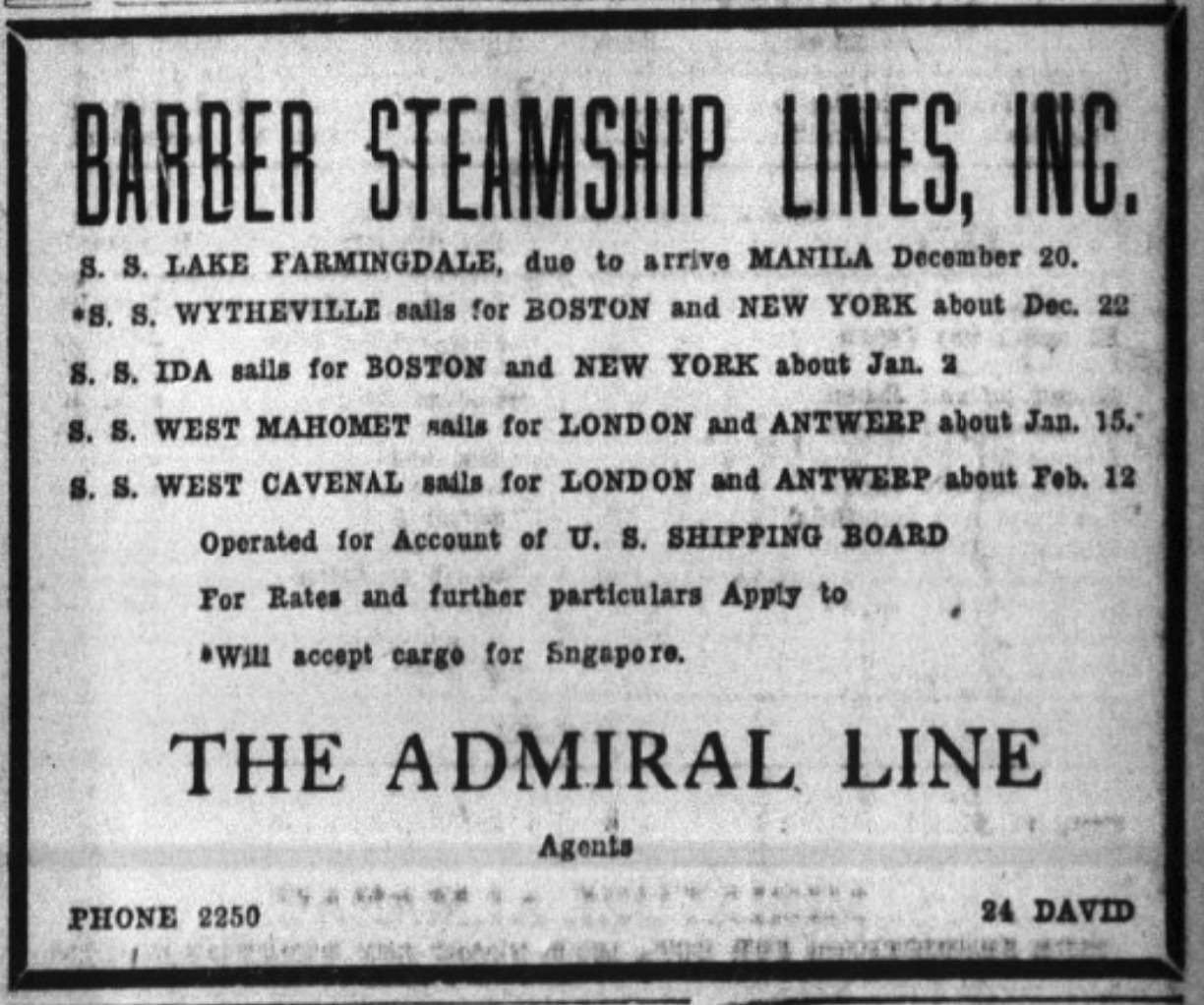
Newspaper announcement of Lake Farmingdale's 1919 arrival in Manila

Lake Farmingdale left Duluth on 26 July 1919, headed for Cleveland. She sailed briefly on the east coast in 1919. The lowlight of this period was her collision with the steamship Grantley in the Miramichi River in New Brunswick. On 10 September 1919, she left her dock in the river with a cargo of wood pulp, bound for Portland. She overtook and then collided with the Grantley, also headed out to sea. The damage did not prevent her from continuing her travels, and she left Portland for New York on 16 September 1919.

She was consigned to the Barber Lines by the Shipping Board. She sailed for her new company from New York bound for Yokohama, Japan on 5 October 1919. She reached Japan via the Panama Canal, San Francisco, and Honolulu. She had a full cargo of general merchandise, but lost a portion of her deck cargo, carboys of acid, in heavy seas off San Francisco. After stopping in Japan, she reached Manila, Philippines on 21 December 1919. Once her cargo was unloaded, the ship was turned over to the Pacific Mail Steamship Company.

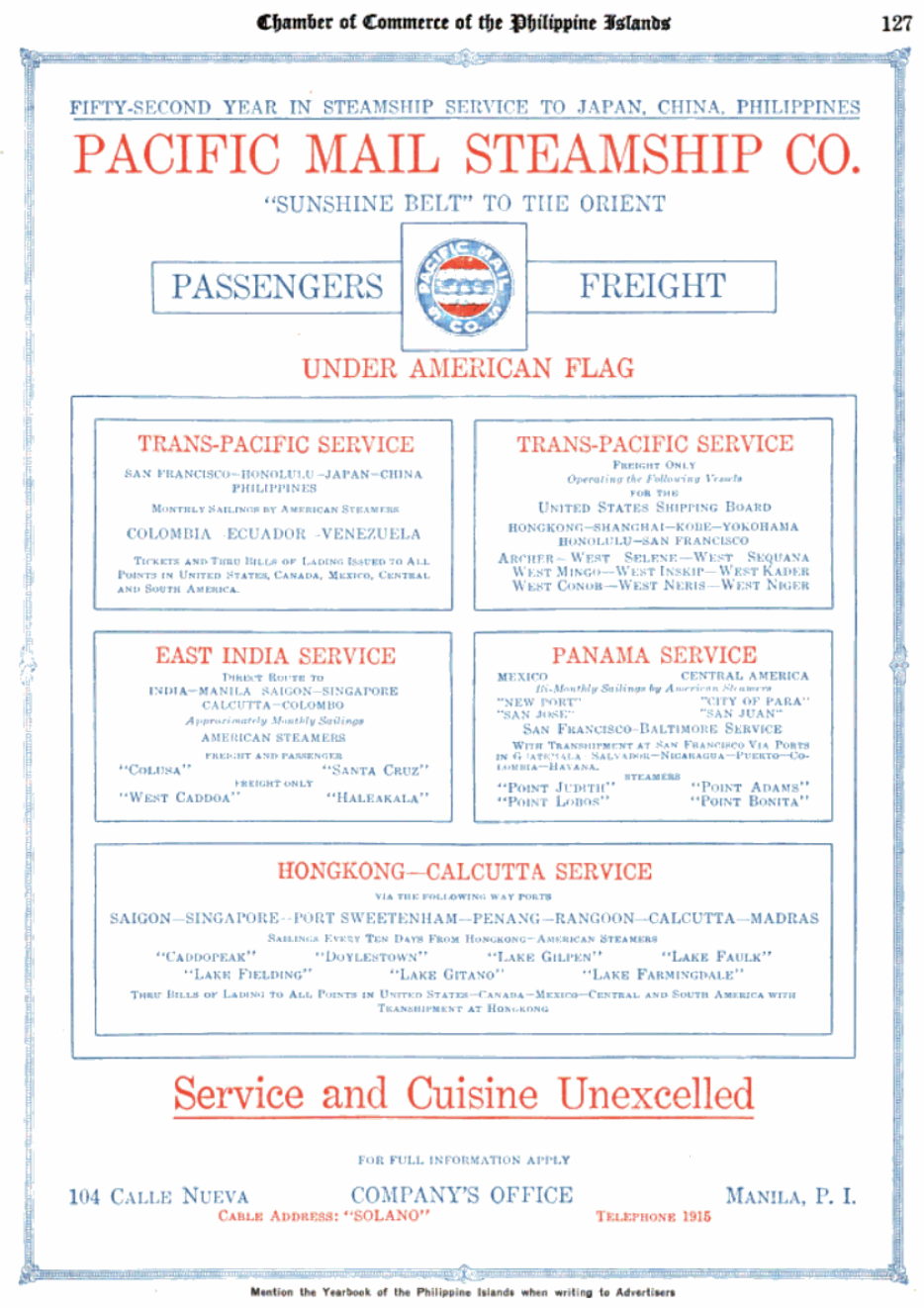
1920 Pacific Mail Steamship Company advertisement. Lake Farmingdale is shown as part of the Hong Kong-Calcutta service.

Lake Farmingdale sailed continuously in Southeast Asia for the Pacific Mail Steamship Company until 1922, calling at Hong Kong, Manila, Singapore, Calcutta, Saigon, Rangoon, Haiphong, Foochow, and Penang. Her last reported trip, in January 1922, had her sailing from Saigon to Calcutta.

It is not clear what the ship did in 1923, but given the global shipping glut at the end of World War I, it is possible that she was idle. In any case, on 16 June 1924, the Shipping Board entered into a six-month bare-boat charter of Lake Farmingdale with Captain Juan Gisbert. The ship was delivered to him at Olongapo, Philippines. Gisbert never paid for the insurance required under the charter agreement and it was terminated in August 1924. The ship was returned to Olongapo.

=== Cadwallader-Gibson Lumber Company (1925–1942) ===
In 1925, the Shipping Board sold Lake Farmingdale to Cadwallader-Gibson Lumber Company for $60,000 This was the American subsidiary of Cadwallader-Gibson, a large Philippine lumber company which had several sawmills and logging rights in hardwood forests on Luzon. Lake Farmingdale, now renamed Florence D., could carry nearly 2 million board feet of lumber. Florence D. was registered in the Philippines with her home port Manila. It may be that Florence D. was named after Florence D. Cadwallader, who was prominent in the woman's suffrage movement in the Philippines.

From 1929 to 1931 Florence D. sailed for the Philippine Steam Navigation Company, presumably under a charter from Cadwallader-Gibson, since Lloyd's Register shows no change in ownership. She was used as an inter-islander steamer, advertising "Excellent first and third class accommodations for passengers. Both Spanish and American Cooking." During this period she is recorded as calling at Bais, Cagayan, Cebu, Iloilo, Lamit Bay, Legaspi, Liguan, Sumagui, Tabaco, and Zamboanga.

== Loss of Florence D. (February 1942) ==
The Japanese assault on the Philippines began on 8 December 1941. General Douglas MacArthur's forces were in urgent need of additional supplies to defend the territory. The supply situation was so concerning that, on 18 January 1942, General George C. Marshall, Chief of Staff of the United States Army, cabled Major General Julian F. Barnes, the top Army officer in Australia, to commission blockade runners. Barnes, in turn, entrusted this mission to Colonel John D. Robenson, who flew to Java to find ships willing to attempt the mission.

When Robenson reached Soerabaja he was able to acquire supplies that MacArthur could use from the recently arrived President Polk. Finding ships willing to run the Japanese blockade was more difficult. In Soerabaja Harbor was Florence D., then chartered by the Naval Transport Service. The Navy did not want to release any of its ships, fearing that they would be destroyed. After repeated requests from Robenson, Rear Admiral William A. Glassford agreed to release Florence D. to the Army. Robenson signed a charter contract for Florence D. on 9 February 1942. She was to carry arms and supplies from Soerabaja to Gingoog, Mindanao. The thinking at the time was that once the supplies were in Mindanao, the abundant small craft in the area could shuttle them to MacArthur's forces in Bataan and Corregidor. The ship was loaded with 3-inch artillery shells, .30 and .50-caliber ammunition, 3,000 reels of barbed wire, 51,900 pounds (23,500 kg) of telephone wire, 250,000 pounds (110,000 kg) of sole leather, 16 cases of airplane parts, 300,000 pounds (140,000 kg) of sugar, and some sheet steel. Florence D. sailed from Soerabaja on 14 February 1942 and headed east toward the Timor Sea.

At 0730 on 19 February 1942, lookouts spotted Japanese carrier aircraft which were on their way to bomb Darwin, Australia. One of them shot down an American Navy PBY-5 from Patrol Squadron 22 which landed near the ship. Florence D rescued the eight crew members, which included the pilot, Lt. Thomas H. Moorer, who later in his career became Chief of Naval Operations, and co-pilot Ensign Walter H. Mosley, whose valor later in the war was honored in the naming of the destroyer escort USS Mosley.

At one in the afternoon, on 19 February 1942, a Japanese twin-float seaplane dropped two bombs on Florence D, and missed. It strafed the ship before leaving. Val dive bombers launched from the carrier Hiryū found Florence D. about an hour later. A bomb hit the bow and set off some of the ammunition the ship was carrying. Three more bombs were near misses. The ship sank bow first, but remained afloat long enough for the survivors to cut loose two lifeboats. Three of the Filipino crew were killed, as was one of the American flyers rescued from the PBY. There were forty men aboard the two lifeboats.

After about nine hours the two boats landed on Bathurst Island, north of Darwin. The survivors were picked up on 22 February 1942 by HMAS Warrnambool. She was attacked by a Japanese flying boat, but used a smoke screen to avoid damage and returned safely to Darwin.
