= USS Bristol (DD-453) =

Gleaves-class destroyer

Coordinates: 37°19′N 6°19′E

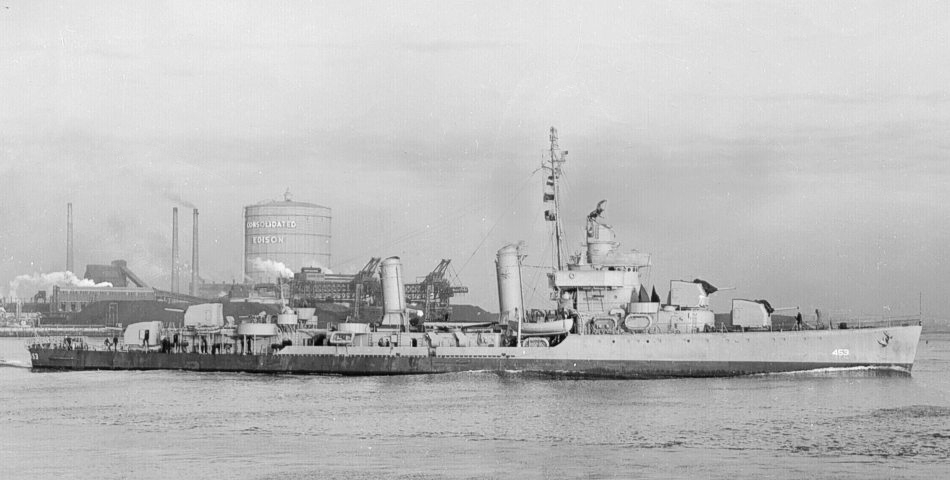
- USS Bristol (DD-453) off the Brooklyn Navy Yard in January 1943.

History

United States
- Name: Bristol
- Namesake: Mark Lambert Bristol
- Builder: Federal Shipbuilding and Drydock Company
- Laid down: 20 December 1940
- Launched: 25 July 1941
- Commissioned: 22 October 1941
- Fate: Torpedoed and sunk on 13 October 1943

General characteristics
- Class & type: Gleaves-class destroyer
- Displacement: 1,630 tons (normal); 2,395 tons (full load)
- Length: 341 ft (104 m) (waterline), 348 ft 3 in (106.15 m) (overall)
- Beam: 36 ft (11 m)
- Draft: 11 ft 9 in (3.58 m) (normal), 17 ft 6 in (5.33 m) (full load)
- Propulsion: four Babcock & Wilcox boilers; General Electric geared turbines; two shafts; 50,000 shp (37,000 kW)
- Speed: 37.5 kn (69.5 km/h; 43.2 mph)
- Range: 6,000 nmi (11,000 km; 6,900 mi) at 15 kn (28 km/h; 17 mph)
- Complement: 208 (276 war)
- Armament: 4 × 5 in (127 mm) DP guns, 1 × 1.1 in (28 mm) quad AA gun, 6 × 0.5 in (12.7 mm) guns, 10 × 21 in (533 mm) torpedo tubes

USS Bristol (DD 453) was a Bristol class destroyer, later absorbed into the Gleaves class, of the United States Navy, named for Rear Admiral Mark Lambert Bristol. She was launched 25 July 1941 by Federal Shipbuilding, Kearny, New Jersey; sponsored by Mrs. Powell Clayton.The destroyer was commissioned on 22 October 1941.

== Service history ==
During her first year of service Bristol operated as a patrol and convoy escort in the North Atlantic, making several trans-Atlantic voyages to Ireland. On 22 September 1942, Cmdr John Albert Glick took over command of the ship. On 24 October 1942, she made her first voyage to North Africa, as part of the Operation Torch landings at Fedala, French Morocco (8–17 November). Returning to the United States in late November, she operated out of Norfolk, Virginia until 14 January 1943, when she again steamed to the Mediterranean where, with the exception of one trip to the Panama Canal Zone in April 1943, she served exclusively until 13 October 1943.

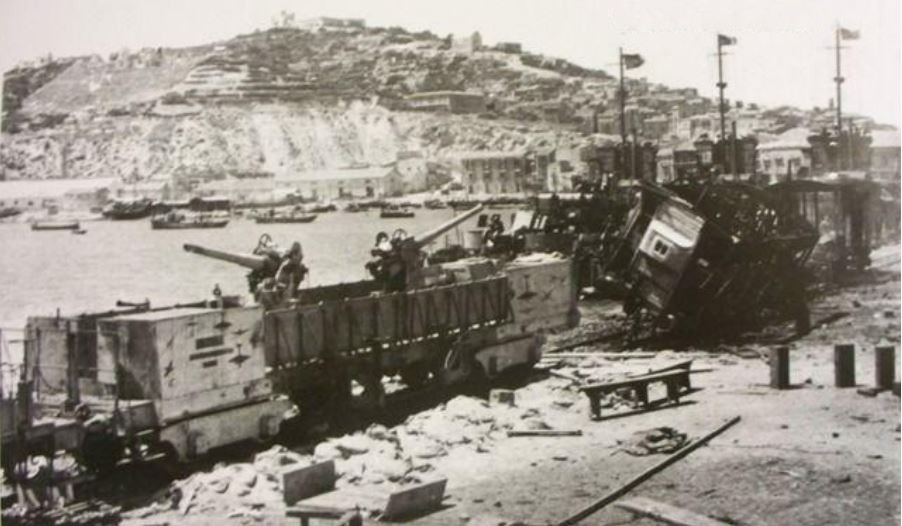
Remains of the Italian Navy armed train ("treno armato") T.A. 76/2/T (it).

While on duty in that area, she took part in Operation Husky (9 July – 17 August 1943) and the Salerno landings (9–21 September). On 11 September 1943, Bristol rescued 70 survivors from the torpedoed destroyer Rowan. While performing shore bombardment during the same operation, she destroyed the Italian Navy armed train ("treno armato") T.A. 76/2/T around the port of Licata.

At 04:30 on 13 October 1943, while escorting a convoy to Oran, Algeria, Bristol was struck on the port side at the forward engine room by a single torpedo from U-boat U-371 commanded by Waldemar Mehl. Bristol was broken in half by the single explosion. No fires resulted, but steam, electrical power, and communications were lost and the ship had to be abandoned. Eight minutes after the explosion the aft section sank, followed four minutes later by the foreparts. Bristol suffered the loss of 52 of her crew; the survivors were rescued by the destroyers Trippe and Wainwright.

=== Convoys escorted ===
Convoy	Escort Group	Dates	Notes
HX 179	MOEF group A5	13–22 March 1942	21 ships escorted without loss from Newfoundland to Northern Ireland
ON 81	MOEF group A5	30 March–9 April 1942	13 ships escorted without loss from Northern Ireland to Newfoundland
AT 17		1–12 July 1942	6 troopships escorted without loss from New York City to Firth of Clyde
UGF 1		24 October–8 November 1942	31 ships escorted without loss from Chesapeake Bay to Operation Torch
UGF 4		14–25 January 1943	21 ships escorted without loss from Chesapeake Bay to Mediterranean Sea
UGF 6		5–18 March 1943	22 ships escorted without loss from Chesapeake Bay to Mediterranean Sea
UGS 6	battle reinforcement	20–22 March 1943	Chesapeake Bay to Mediterranean Sea; 3 ships torpedoed & sunk
GUF 6		25 March–7 April 1943	15 ships escorted without loss from Mediterranean Sea to Chesapeake Bay
UGS 8A		17 May–1 June 1943	80 ships escorted without loss from Chesapeake Bay to Mediterranean Sea

== Awards ==
Bristol received three battle stars for her World War II service.
