= German submarine U-371 =

German type VII C World War II submarine

History

Nazi Germany
- Name: U-371
- Ordered: 23 September 1939
- Builder: Howaldtswerke, Kiel
- Yard number: 2
- Laid down: 17 November 1939
- Launched: 27 January 1941
- Commissioned: 15 March 1941
- Fate: Sunk on 4 May 1944

General characteristics
- Class & type: Type VIIC submarine
- Displacement: 769 tonnes (757 long tons) surfaced; 871 t (857 long tons) submerged
- Length: 67.10 m (220 ft 2 in) o/a; 50.50 m (165 ft 8 in) pressure hull
- Beam: 6.20 m (20 ft 4 in) o/a; 4.70 m (15 ft 5 in) pressure hull
- Height: 9.60 m (31 ft 6 in)
- Draught: 4.74 m (15 ft 7 in)
- Installed power: 2,800–3,200 PS (2,100–2,400 kW; 2,800–3,200 bhp) (diesels); 750 PS (550 kW; 740 shp) (electric)
- Propulsion: 2 shafts; 2 × diesel engines; 2 × electric motors
- Speed: 17.7 knots (32.8 km/h; 20.4 mph) surfaced; 7.6 knots (14.1 km/h; 8.7 mph) submerged
- Range: 8,500 nmi (15,700 km; 9,800 mi) at 10 knots (19 km/h; 12 mph) surfaced; 80 nmi (150 km; 92 mi) at 4 knots (7.4 km/h; 4.6 mph) submerged
- Test depth: 230 m (750 ft); Crush depth: 250–295 m (820–968 ft)
- Complement: 4 officers, 40–56 enlisted
- Armament: 5 × 53.3 cm (21 in) torpedo tubes (four bow, one stern); 14 × torpedoes or 26 TMA mines; 1 × 8.8 cm (3.46 in) deck gun (220 rounds); 1 x 2 cm (0.79 in) C/30 AA gun

Service record
- Part of: 1st U-boat Flotilla; 15 March – 31 October 1941; 23rd U-boat Flotilla; 1 November 1941 – 14 April 1942; 29th U-boat Flotilla; 15 April 1942 – 4 May 1944
- Identification codes: M 40 472
- Commanders: Kptlt. Heinrich Driver; 15 March 1941 – 5 April 1942; Oblt.z.S. Karl-Otto Weber; 26 March – 6 April 1942; Kptlt. Heinz-Joachim Neumann (acting); 6 April – 24 May 1942; Kptlt. Waldemar Mehl; 25 May 1942 – 4 April 1944; Oblt.z.S. Horst-Arno Fenski; 5 April – 4 May 1944
- Operations: 19 patrols: 1st patrol: 5 June – 1 July 1941; 2nd patrol: 23 July – 19 August 1941; 3rd patrol: 16 September – 24 October 1941; 4th patrol: 4 December 1941 – 10 January 1942; 5th patrol: 4 – 25 March 1942; 6th patrol: a. 21 April – 9 May 1942; b. 1 – 7 July 1942; 7th patrol: a. 5 – 18 September 1942; b. 12 – 16 October 1942; 8th patrol: 1 – 4 December 1942; 9th patrol: 7 December 1942 – 10 January 1943; 10th patrol: 14 February – 3 March 1943; 11th patrol: 7 April – 11 May 1943; 12th patrol: 3 – 12 July 1943; 13th patrol: 22 July – 11 August 1943; 14th patrol: 21 August – 3 September 1943; 15th patrol: 7 – 28 October 1943; 16th patrol: 15 – 23 November 1943; 17th patrol: 22 January – 13 February 1944; 18th patrol: 4 – 25 March 1944; 19th patrol: 23 April – 4 May 1944
- Victories: 8 merchant ships sunk (51,401 GRT); 2 warships sunk (2,286 tons); 1 auxiliary warship sunk (545 GRT); 2 merchant ships total loss (13,341 GRT); 4 merchant ships damaged (28,072 GRT); 2 warships damaged (2,500 tons)

German submarine U-371 was a Type VIIC U-boat of Nazi Germany's Kriegsmarine during World War II. The submarine was laid down on 17 November 1939 in Kiel, launched on 27 January 1941, and commissioned on 15 March under the command of Oberleutnant zur See Heinrich Driver. After training, U-371 was ready for front-line service with the 1st U-boat Flotilla from 1 July 1941.

Operating mostly in the Mediterranean Sea, in 19 patrols between June 1941 and May 1944 the U-boat sank 11 ships totalling 51,946 GRT and 2,286 tons, including the American destroyer USS Bristol, and damaged six more totalling 28,072 GRT and 2,500 tons.

U-371 was sunk at 04:09 local time on 4 May 1944 in the Mediterranean north of Jijel, in position 37°49′N 05°39′E by a force of American, French and British destroyers. Three men were killed, with 49 survivors.

== Design ==
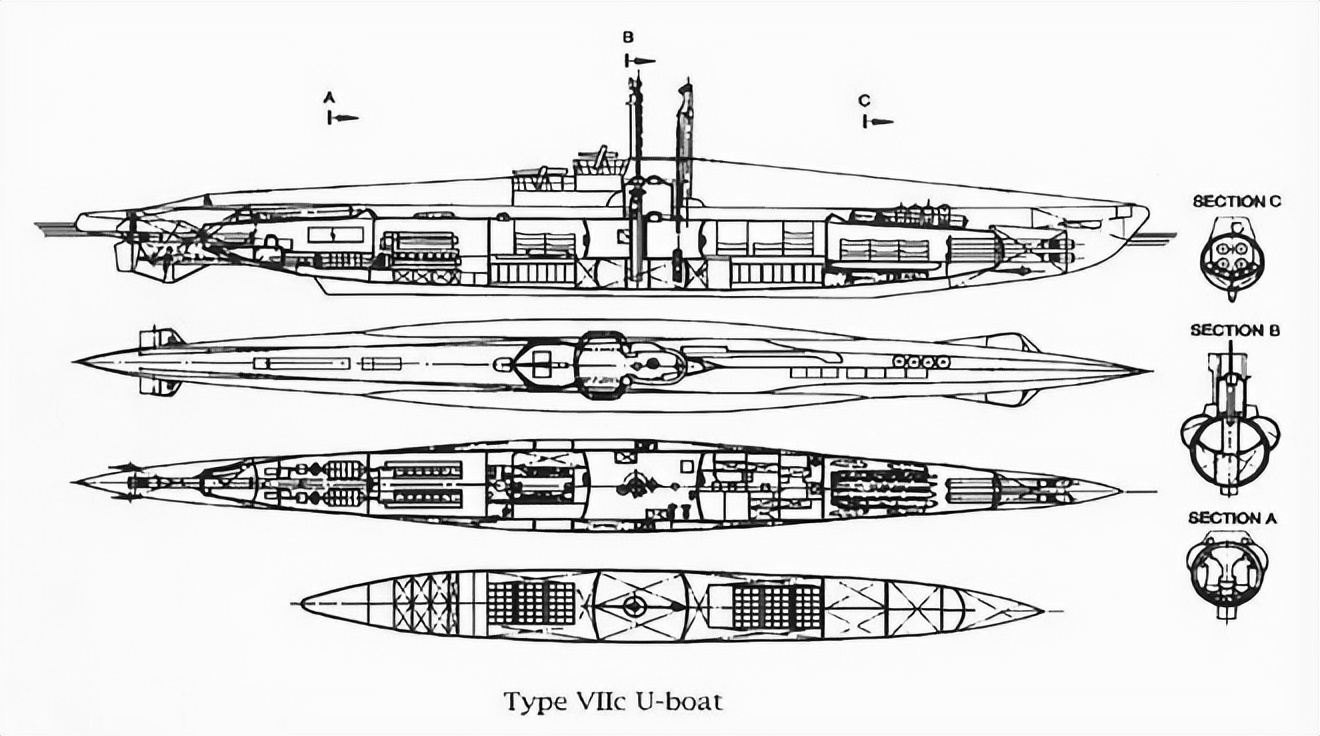
A cross-section of a Type VIIC submarine

German Type VIIC submarines were preceded by the shorter Type VIIB submarines. U-371 had a displacement of 769 tonnes (757 long tons) when at the surface and 871 tonnes (857 long tons) while submerged. She had a total length of 67.10 m (220 ft 2 in), a pressure hull length of 50.50 m (165 ft 8 in), a beam of 6.20 m (20 ft 4 in), a height of 9.60 m (31 ft 6 in), and a draught of 4.74 m (15 ft 7 in). The submarine was powered by two Germaniawerft F46 four-stroke, six-cylinder supercharged diesel engines producing a total of 2,800 to 3,200 metric horsepower (2,060 to 2,350 kW; 2,760 to 3,160 shp) for use while surfaced, two AEG GU 460/8–27 double-acting electric motors producing a total of 750 metric horsepower (550 kW; 740 shp) for use while submerged. She had two shafts and two 1.23 m (4 ft) propellers. The boat was capable of operating at depths of up to 230 metres (750 ft).

The submarine had a maximum surface speed of 17.7 knots (32.8 km/h; 20.4 mph) and a maximum submerged speed of 7.6 knots (14.1 km/h; 8.7 mph). When submerged, the boat could operate for 80 nautical miles (150 km; 92 mi) at 4 knots (7.4 km/h; 4.6 mph); when surfaced, she could travel 8,500 nautical miles (15,700 km; 9,800 mi) at 10 knots (19 km/h; 12 mph). U-371 was fitted with five 53.3 cm (21 in) torpedo tubes (four fitted at the bow and one at the stern), fourteen torpedoes, one 8.8 cm (3.46 in) SK C/35 naval gun, 220 rounds, and a 2 cm (0.79 in) C/30 anti-aircraft gun. The boat had a complement of between forty-four and sixty.

== Service history ==
U-371 was ordered by the Kriegsmarine on 23 September 1939. She was laid down about two months later at the Howaldtswerke yard in Kiel, on 17 November. Just over a year and two months later, U-371 was launched on 27 January 1941. She was formally commissioned later that year on 15 March.

=== First patrol ===
U-371 left Kiel on 5 June 1941, under the command of Kapitänleutnant Heinrich Driver, and sailed out into the north Atlantic. She sank two merchant ships; the British 6,373 GRT Silverpalm on 12 June and the Norwegian 4,765 GRT Vigrid on 24 June, position 54.30N- 41.30W whilst on a voyage from New Orleans, LA, USA via Bermuda to Belfast, Northern Ireland and Manchester, England with 6,000 t general cargo including 1.000 t spelter, 600 t copper and 752 t iron and steel. 47 persons on board. 21 crew, one gunner and 4 passengers died. before U -371 arriving at Brest in France on 1 July.

=== Second patrol ===
The U-boat sailed from Brest on 23 July 1941 to patrol between the coast of Portugal and the Azores. Early on 30 July she sank two more merchant ships south-east of the Azores, both from Convoy OS-1; the British 6,935 GRT Shahristan, and the Dutch 7,049 GRT Sitoebondo. She returned to Brest on 19 August.

=== Third patrol ===
U-371 departed from Brest on 16 September 1941, sailing south, and then through the Strait of Gibraltar into the Mediterranean Sea. After patrolling the coast of Egypt, the U-boat arrived at Salamis in Greece on 24 October, having had no successes, officially transferring to the 23rd U-boat Flotilla on 1 November.

=== Fourth and fifth patrols ===
U-371 carried out two more patrols along the coast of Egypt and in the Eastern Mediterranean from December 1941 to January 1942 and again in March 1942, but sank no ships.

=== 6th patrol ===
Now part of the 29th U-boat Flotilla, U-371 left Salamis again on 21 April 1942 under the temporary command of Kapitänleutnant Heinz-Joachim Neumann, and headed south to the coast of Egypt. However, on 7 May the U-boat was depth-charged by two submarine chasers and so badly damaged that she had to return to base. She arrived back at Salamis on 9 May.

=== 7th patrol ===
Command of U-371 was now assumed by Kapitänleutnant Waldemar Mehl, who took the U-boat from Salamis to Pola, Venezia Giulia, in early July, not sailing on a combat patrol until 5 September when he took the U-boat along the length of the Adriatic Sea, and through the eastern Mediterranean to the coast of British Palestine and French Syria, arriving back at Salamis on 18 September, and returning to Pola in mid-October.

=== Eighth and ninth patrols ===
The U-boat left Pola and sailed to Messina in Sicily on 1 to 4 December 1942, leaving on 7 December to attack the Allied shipping off the coast of French Algeria after "Operation Torch", the invasion of North Africa. There, on 7 January 1943, she attacked Convoy MKS-5, sinking the British naval trawler HMS Jura, and later the same day damaged the 7,159 GRT British troopship Ville de Strasbourg. The U-boat then sailed to La Spezia in north-western Italy, arriving on 10 January 1943.

=== 10th patrol ===
The Algerian coast now became U-371's hunting ground, and she left La Spezia on 14 February 1943 to return there to sink the unescorted 2,089 GRT British merchant ship Fintra on 23 February, and to damage the 7,176 GRT American liberty ship Daniel Carroll from Convoy TE-16, before returning to La Spezia on 3 March.

=== 11th patrol ===
U-371 departed La Spezia again on 7 April 1943, once more heading to the Algerian coast, where she sank the 1,162 GRT Dutch merchant ship Merope on 27 April, before heading to her new home port of Toulon in southern France on 11 May 1943.

=== 12th patrol ===
After leaving Toulon on 3 July 1943, on the tenth, U-371 attacked Convoy ET-22A, damaging two American ships; the 6,561 GRT tanker Gulfprince and the 7,176 GRT liberty ship Matthew Maury, returning to Toulon on the 12th.

=== 13th and 14th patrol ===
U-371's next patrol lasted from 22 July until 11 August 1943, during which she sank the 6,004 GRT British merchant ship Contractor, part of Convoy GTX-5. U-371 patrolled again from 21 August to 3 September 1943, but made no successful attacks.

=== 15th patrol ===
Leaving Toulon on 7 October 1943, U-371 once more haunted the Algerian coast, sinking the British minesweeper HMS Hythe on 11 October, the American destroyer USS Bristol on the 13th, and on the 15th torpedoed the American liberty ship James Russell Lowell, damaging her so badly that she was declared a total loss. The U-boat returned to base on 28 October.

=== 16th and 17th patrols ===
The U-boat's next patrol was short, lasting from 15 to 23 November 1943, and was unsuccessful. Her 17th patrol began on 22 January 1944, and took her to the western coast of Italy after the launching of "Operation Shingle", the Allied landings at Anzio. She made no successful attacks and returned to Toulon on 13 February.

=== 18th patrol ===
U-371 departed Toulon on 4 March 1944 and returned to the Algerian coast. On the 17th she attacked Convoy SNF-17, sinking the 17,024 GRT Dutch troopship Dempo, and badly damaging the 6,165 GRT American C2 cargo ship Maiden Creek, which later broke in two after being beached. The U-boat returned to Toulon on 25 March. Three days later, U-371's commander, Waldemar Mehl, received the Knight's Cross of the Iron Cross, before leaving the U-boat to serve on the staff of FdU Mittelmeer ("U-boat Command Mediterranean"). On 5 April command of U-371 passed to Oberleutnant zur See Horst-Arno Fenski, former commander of U-410.

=== 19th patrol ===
Under Fenski's command, U-371 left Toulon for the final time at about 19:00 on 23 April 1944, and headed back to the coast of Algeria, patrolling from 10 to 15 miles offshore.

On 28 April, U-371 received a report of a large convoy and set course to intercept it. On the night of 2 May, the U-boat planned to surface in order to top up her batteries by running on her diesel engines, as she expected to contact the convoy within a few hours. Unfortunately on doing so, she found herself almost in the middle of the convoy, and immediately crash-dived to about 100 metres (330 ft). After an hour, the U-boat surfaced again and headed toward the convoy, but was soon detected by American destroyer escort USS Menges. As the US ship closed to 3,000 m (3,300 yd), U-371 fired a T-5 acoustic torpedo from her stern tube, and immediately dived. The Menges was hit; the aft third of the vessel was destroyed, killing 31 men and wounding 25. But she remained afloat and was towed to Bougie in Algeria and later repaired and returned to service.

=== Fate ===
U-371 found herself being relentlessly hunted by American destroyer escorts USS Pride and USS Joseph E. Campbell, the Free French Sénégalais and L'Alcyon, and the British HMS Blankney.

When U-371 first attempted to surface after crippling the Menges, depth charges forced her back down, cutting all the lights, damaging the hydroplanes, and rupturing the trim tanks. The U-boat levelled off at about 200–215 metres (656–705 ft), leaking badly. The depth charge attacks continued at about 30-minute intervals, with increasing accuracy, and the U-boat sustained further damage.

At around 06:00 on 3 May, U-371 attempted to evade ASDIC (sonar) detection by lying on the sea floor. This would also conserve battery power, which was running dangerously low. She lay on the sea bed at around 240 metres (790 ft) in depth for the rest of the day, hoping the attackers would give up the hunt. Late that night though, the surface vessels could still be heard, and with the air quality in the boat rapidly deteriorating, the emergency lighting system out, and with U-371 having taken on about 15 tons of water, Fenski, the U-boat's commander, decided that their only hope was to surface and attempt to escape in the darkness.

Blowing her ballast tanks only attracted the attention of the attackers, which began dropping depth charges again, and the U-boat was still stuck on the sea bed. The crew had to run from one end of the U-boat to the other while the engines ran at full power in order to break the grip of the mud before the U-boat finally began to surface. All torpedo tubes were loaded and readied for firing, and all guns were manned when U-371, her batteries practically exhausted, surfaced and ran for safety.

After fifteen minutes, the enemy was seen coming up astern, immediately opening fire and scoring several hits. The U-boat returned fire, but the situation was clearly hopeless and most of her crew jumped overboard. As a last show of defiance, the U-boat fired a T-5 acoustic torpedo from her stern tube and managed to hit the Sénégalais, causing some damage.

By this time, around 04:00 on 4 May 1944, only commander Fenski, the Engineering Officer and a control room petty officer remained aboard. The latter two remained below to flood the tanks, which caused U-371 to sink so rapidly that they were unable to escape, and both drowned.

=== Wolfpacks ===
U-371 took part in two wolfpacks, namely:

- Kurfürst (17 – 20 June 1941)
- Goeben (16 – 24 September 1941)

== Summary of raiding history ==
Date	Ship Name	Nationality	Tonnage (Note: Merchant ship tonnages are in gross register tons. Military vessels are listed by tons displacement.)	Fate
12 June 1941	Silverpalm	United Kingdom	6,373	Sunk
24 June 1941	Vigrid	Norway	4,765	Sunk
30 July 1941	Shahristan	United Kingdom	6,935	Sunk
30 July 1941	Sitoebondo	Netherlands	7,049	Sunk
7 January 1943	HMT Jura	Royal Navy	545	Sunk
7 January 1943	Ville de Strasbourg	United Kingdom	7,159	Damaged
23 February 1943	Fintra	United Kingdom	2,089	Sunk
28 February 1943	Daniel Carroll	United States	7,176	Damaged
27 April 1943	Merope	Netherlands	1,162	Sunk
10 July 1943	Gulfprince	United States	6,561	Damaged
10 July 1943	Matthew Maury	United States	7,176	Damaged
7 August 1943	Contractor	United Kingdom	6,004	Sunk
11 October 1943	HMS Hythe	Royal Navy	656	Sunk
13 October 1943	USS Bristol	United States Navy	1,630	Sunk
15 October 1943	James Russell Lowel	United States	7,176	Total loss
17 March 1944	Dempo	Netherlands	17,024	Sunk
17 March 1944	Maiden Creek	United States	6,165	Total loss
3 May 1944	USS Menges	United States Navy	1,200	Damaged
4 May 1944	FFL Sénégalais	Free French Naval Forces	1,300	Damaged

== Bibliography ==
- Busch, Rainer; Röll, Hans-Joachim (1999). German U-boat commanders of World War II : a biographical dictionary. Translated by Brooks, Geoffrey. London, Annapolis, Md: Greenhill Books, Naval Institute Press. ISBN 1-55750-186-6.
- Busch, Rainer; Röll, Hans-Joachim (1999). Deutsche U-Boot-Verluste von September 1939 bis Mai 1945 [German U-boat losses from September 1939 to May 1945]. Der U-Boot-Krieg (in German). Vol. IV. Hamburg, Berlin, Bonn: Mittler. ISBN 3-8132-0514-2.
- Gröner, Erich; Jung, Dieter; Maass, Martin (1991). U-boats and Mine Warfare Vessels. German Warships 1815–1945. Vol. 2. Translated by Thomas, Keith; Magowan, Rachel. London: Conway Maritime Press. ISBN 0-85177-593-4.
- Kemp, Paul (1997). U-Boats Destroyed – German Submarine Losses in the World Wars. Arms & Armour. ISBN 1-85409-515-3.
