= USS Lansdale (DD-426) =

Benson-class destroyer

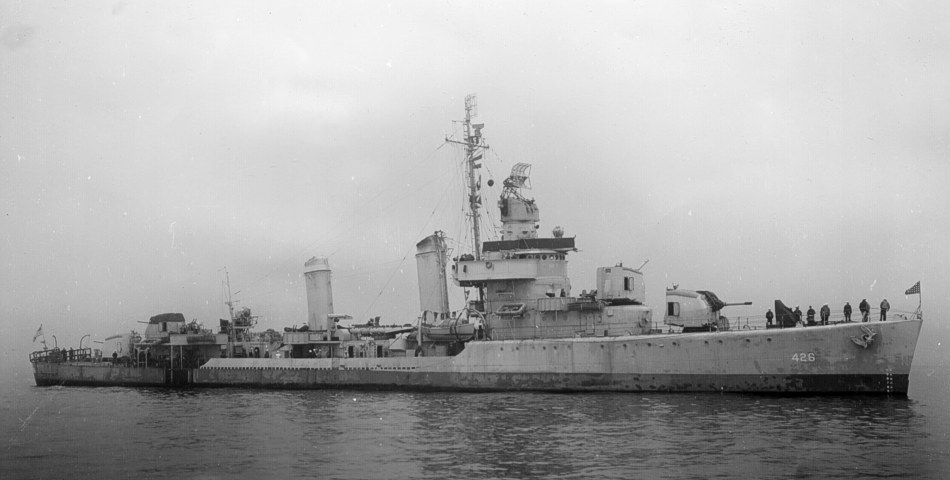
- USS Lansdale (DD-426) off New York in October 1943

History

United States
- Name: USS Lansdale (DD-426)
- Namesake: Lieutenant Philip Lansdale
- Builder: Boston Navy Yard
- Laid down: 19 December 1938
- Launched: 30 October 1939
- Sponsored by: Mrs. Ethel S. Lansdale
- Commissioned: 17 September 1940
- Honors and awards: 4 Battle Stars
- Fate: Sunk by enemy action, 20 April 1944

General characteristics
- Class & type: Benson-class destroyer
- Displacement: 1,620 long tons (1,650 t)
- Length: 347 ft 11 in (106.05 m)
- Beam: 36 ft 1 in (11.00 m)
- Draft: 11 ft 9 in (3.58 m)
- Speed: 33 kn (38 mph; 61 km/h)
- Complement: 191
- Armament: 5 × 5 in (127 mm)/38 cal Mark 12 dual purpose guns, 4 × .50 in (13 mm) machine guns, 10 × 21 inch (533 mm) torpedo tubes, 1 × depth charge thrower

The second USS Lansdale (DD-426) was a Benson-class destroyer in the United States Navy during World War II. She was named for Philip Lansdale.

Lansdale was laid down on 19 December 1938 by Boston Navy Yard; launched on 30 October 1939; sponsored by Mrs. Ethel S. Lansdale, widow of the ship's namesake; and commissioned on 17 September 1940 at Boston, Massachusetts.

== 1941 ==
After shakedown in the Caribbean, Lansdale departed Boston on 18 January 1941 for Neutrality patrol duty in the Caribbean. She cruised off Cuba, the Virgin Islands, Martinique, and the British West Indies before returning to Boston on 6 March. After escort training along the Atlantic coast, she screened transports from Charleston, South Carolina, to NS Argentia, Newfoundland, in late June, then departed Argentia on 30 June on a neutrality-patrol run to Iceland. During the remainder of the year, she made three escort runs between Newfoundland and Iceland. En route to Hvalfjörður, Iceland, when the United States entered the war against the Axis, she steamed to Boston from 15 to 24 December.

== 1942 ==
Lansdale escorted seven troopships from New York City to Key West from 22 to 27 January 1942 before arriving Casco Bay, Maine on 1 February to serve as plane guard for the aircraft carrier Wasp. For the next six months, anti-submarine warfare patrols and escort run carried her from the eastern seaboard to Iceland, the Caribbean, the Panama Canal, and the Gulf of Mexico. From 8 to 21 May, she patrolled the Atlantic between Puerto Rico and Bermuda with the light cruisers Savannah and Juneau, after which she resumed convoy screening out of Norfolk, Virginia.

On 9 August, Lansdale joined a convoy out of Halifax, Nova Scotia, bound for Northern Ireland. Arriving Lisahally on the 18th, she returned as escort from Greenock, Scotland, to New York from 27 August to 5 September. After escorting another convoy from New York via Halifax to Northern Ireland, she returned to New York from 10 to 21 October as screen for the battleship Arkansas, then departed on 2 November with Task Force 38 (TF 38) to escort convoy UGF 2 to north Africa. Arriving Safi, French Morocco on 18 November, she patrolled approaches to Safi and Casablanca until 22 December, when she sailed for New York in a convoy of 41 transports and six escorts.

== 1943 ==
Reaching New York on 10 January 1943, she underwent overhaul until 30 January, when she departed with a convoy for Northern Ireland. She reached Derry on 9 February, joined with units of the 42nd British Escort Group, and departed on 15 February to escort tanker convoy UC 1 from the United Kingdom to the West Indies. As the convoy steamed south of the Azores on the 23rd, a German wolf pack of six to 10 submarines made early morning and late night attacks that sank three tankers and damaged two others. Lansdale made several ASW counterattacks without known results, but two nights later she hit a submerging U-boat with 5 in (130 mm) gunfire. Although scattered night attacks continued until the 27th, prompt, aggressive counterattacks by American escorts prevented further losses by the Americans.

Lansdale arrived Port-au-Spain, Trinidad on 6 March as escort for SS Maasyerk before proceeding on 8–9 March to Curaçao, Netherlands Antilles for more escort duty. From 20 March to 6 October, she made eight escort runs between the Caribbean and the United Kingdom, three convoy runs between Curaçao and New York, and periodic escort and patrol runs to Puerto Rico and the Virgin Islands.

== 1944 ==
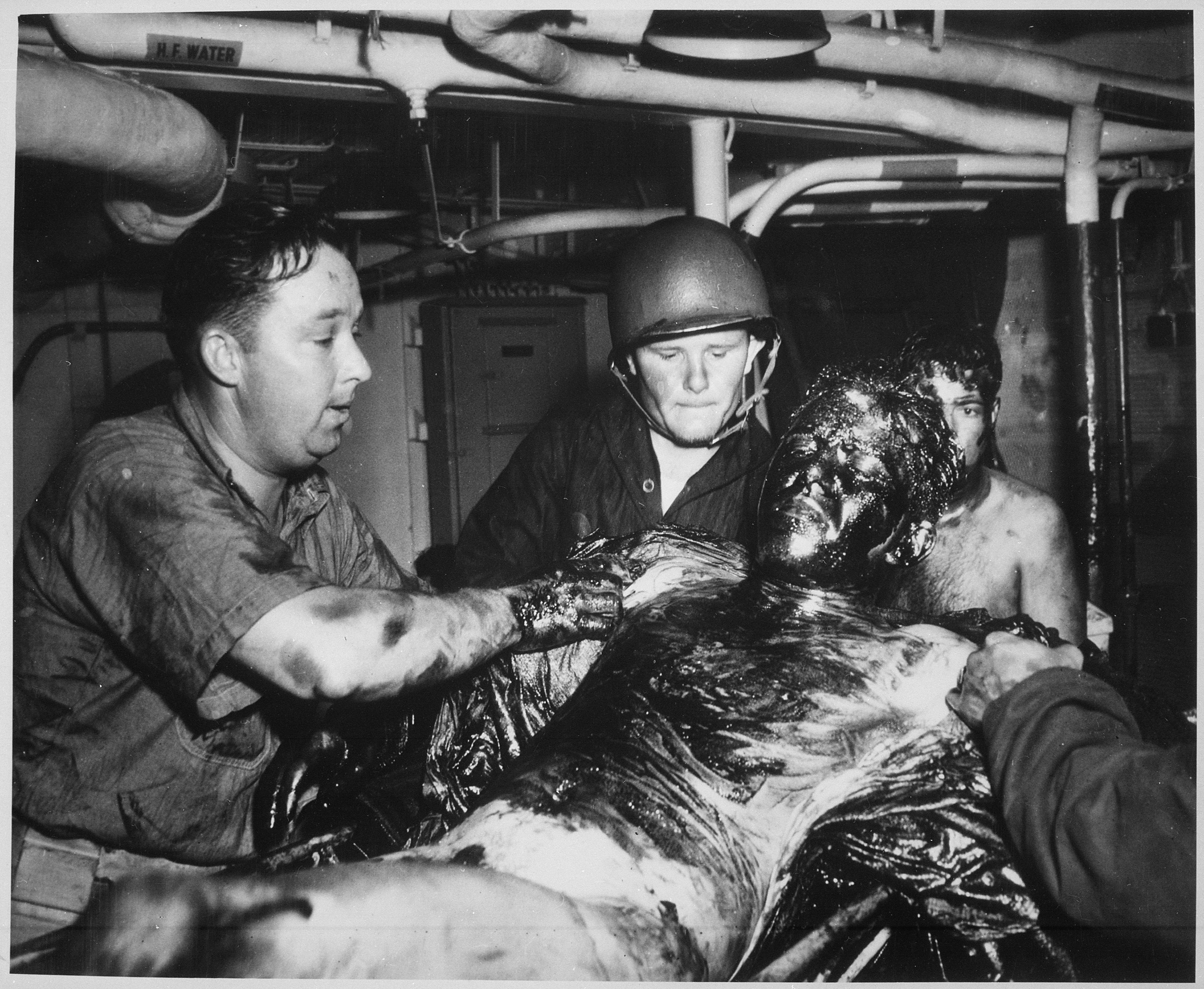
Rescued survivor from USS Lansdale

Continuing escort duty out of Norfolk, Virginia, Lansdale made a run to Casablanca and back from 3 November to 17 December before sailing again for north Africa on 13 January 1944. She reached Casablanca on 1 February and continued the next day via Oran and Algiers to Tunis where she arrived the 10th. After escorting the light cruiser Brooklyn to Algiers, she arrived Pozzuoli, Italy on 14 February for operations off the Anzio beachhead. Until returning to Oran from 22 to 26 March, she searched for German submarines and screened the light cruiser Philadelphia during fire support and shore bombardment operations from Naples to Anzio.

Lansdale departed Oran on 10 April and joined convoy UGS 37, composed of 60 merchant ships and six LSTs, bound from Norfolk to Bizerte. At 23:30 on 11 April, some 16 to 25 German Dornier and Junkers bombers attacked the convoy off Cape Bengut, Algeria. During the next hour, the planes lit the night with flares and struck at the tightly formed convoy with torpedoes and radio-controlled bombs. Although the destroyer escort Holder took a torpedo hit amidships, warning of an impending attack, an effective smokescreen, and massive, accurate anti-aircraft fire repulsed the enemy planes. While losing four planes, the Germans failed to sink a single ship.

Leaving UGS 37 on 12 April, Lansdale escorted three merchant ships from Oran to westbound convoy GUS 36. Then she sailed from Oran 18 April to join UGS 38 the next day. Stationed off the port bow of the Bizerte-bound convoy, she served as a "jam ship" against radio-controlled bombs, in addition to screening against U-boats. As the ships hugged the Algerian coast during first watch on 20 April, they approached approximately the same position off Cape Bengut where the Luftwaffe had attacked UGS 37 on 11–12 April. Though warned of possible attack during the afternoon and evening, the ships had little chance to avoid the strike unleashed by the Germans shortly after 21:00.

Attacking as twilight faded on 20 April, the German planes, flying close to shore and low over the water, evaded radar detection until they were almost upon the convoy. Some 18 to 24 Junkers and Heinkel bombers struck in three waves, minutes after the destroyer escort Joseph E. Campbell of the outer screen reported, "They are all around me...they are enemy, they are enemy."

The first wave of about nine Junkers Ju 88s attacked from dead ahead. Their torpedoes damaged SS Samite and detonated high explosives aboard SS Paul Hamilton, blowing her out of the water and killing all 580 men on board. The second wave of about seven Junkers hit the starboard flank of the convoy and damaged two more merchant ships, one fatally. And the third, consisting of about five Heinkel He 111s, bore down on the convoy's port bow, Lansdale's station.

== Loss ==
Silhouetted by the explosion of Paul Hamilton at 21:04, Lansdale was attacked from both port and starboard by planes from two and possibly three waves. As Heinkels approached on the port bow and launched two torpedoes that missed, Lansdale turned to starboard to repel five Ju 88s which had veered seaward from the convoy. Her guns hit one as it passed down the starboard side; but, as it crashed well astern, another launched a torpedo 500 yd (460 m) on the starboard beam before passing over the forecastle under heavy fire and going down on the port quarter.

The torpedo struck the starboard side forward about 21:06, wrecking the forward fireroom and opening both sides to the sea. Almost split in two, Lansdale immediately took a 12° list to port. Her rudder jammed 22° to starboard, and she steamed at 13 kn (15 mph; 24 km/h) in a clockwise circle.

At 21:12, she again came under attack. Two bombers launched torpedoes on the beam and broad on the bow to port but both missed the still-turning ship. Despite the increasing list, her guns downed one of the planes as it turned away from the ship.

At 21:20, the course of the ship straightened out, but the list increased steadily. Within two minutes, it reached 45° despite the efforts of her crew to control the battle damage. Her skipper, Lt. Cdr. D. M. Swift, ordered her abandoned when he feared the stricken ship might roll "completely over." By 21:30, the list had increased to 80° and the destroyer began to break up. Five minutes later she broke in half, and the stern section quickly sank. The forward section sank 20 minutes later as destroyer escorts Menges and Newell began rescue operations.

The two destroyer escorts swept the water from 21:55 to 03:30 the next morning searching for survivors. Menges picked up 115 men, including two German fliers who were shot down either by Lansdale or Newell. Newell rescued 119 survivors, including Lt. Cdr. Swift. Another survivor was Robert M. Morgenthau, later district attorney of New York County (Manhattan). Forty-seven officers and men were carried down with Lansdale.

Lt. William B. Neal Jr. was cited for distinguished heroism following the attack, receiving the Navy and Marine Corps Medal, Although injured, he continued to provide first aid after the order to abandon ship was given. He continued for over thirty-six hours, saving several lives.

== Convoys escorted ==
Convoy	Escort Group	Dates	Notes
	task force 19	1–7 July 1941	occupation of Iceland prior to US declaration of war
ON 18		24 Sept – 2 Oct 1941	from Iceland to Newfoundland prior to US declaration of war
HX 154		12–19 Oct 1941	from Newfoundland to Iceland prior to US declaration of war
ON 30		2–9 Nov 1941	from Iceland to Newfoundland prior to US declaration of war
HX 162		29 Nov – 7 Dec 1941	from Newfoundland to Iceland prior to US declaration of war
AT 18		6–17 Aug 1942	troopships from New York City to Firth of Clyde
UGF 2		2–18 Nov 1942	from Chesapeake Bay to Morocco
GUS 2		22 Dec 1942 – 13 Jan 1943	from Morocco to Chesapeake Bay
UC 1		15 Feb – 6 March 1943	from Liverpool to Curacao
CU 1		20 March – 1 April 1943	from Curacao to Liverpool
UC 2		9–23 April 1943	from Liverpool to Curacao
CU 2		21 May – 5 June 1943	from Curacao to Liverpool
UC 3		10–26 June 1943	from Liverpool to Curacao
CU 3		11–24 July 1943	from Curacao to Firth of Clyde
UC 3A		30 July-10 Aug 1943	from Liverpool to Curacao
CU 4		26 Aug-9 Sept 1943	from Curacao to Liverpool
UC 4		15–27 Sept 1943	from Liverpool to Curacao
UGS 37		11–12 April 1944	
GUS 36		April 1944	
UGS 38		19–20 April 1944	sunk by German torpedo bombers

== Awards ==
Lansdale received four battle stars for World War II service.
