= HMS Aspirant =

Favourite-class tugboat of the Royal Navy

History

United Kingdom
- Builder: Levingston Shipbuilding Company, Orange, Texas
- Launched: 10 October 1942
- Commissioned: 3 May 1943
- Stricken: 1 May 1946
- Fate: Returned to US Navy, transferred to Belgian Congo Otraco, deleted 1999

General characteristics
- Displacement: 852 tons light
- Length: 165 ft 5 in (50.42 m)
- Beam: 33 ft 4 in (10.16 m) (extreme)
- Draught: 15 ft 10 in (4.83 m) (limiting)
- Propulsion: triple-expansion reciprocating steam engines, single screw, 1,600 hp
- Speed: 12 knots (22 km/h; 14 mph)
- Complement: 52
- Armament: 1 x 3"/50 caliber gun; 2 x single 20mm AA guns

HMS Aspirant (W 134) was a Favourite-class tugboat of the Royal Navy during World War II.

== Service history ==
Aspirant was laid down in late 1942 at the Levingston Shipbuilding Company in Orange, Texas as BATR-42, launched 10 October 1942 and commissioned into the Royal Navy under Lend-Lease on 3 May 1943. She served through the war with the Royal Navy in the Mediterranean Sea. Aspirant was returned to the US Navy on 20 March 1946, struck 1 May 1946 and transferred to the Maritime Commission on 18 November 1946 for disposal. She was sold in 1947 to the Moran Towing and Transportation Company and resold in 1948 to the Office d’Exploitation des Transports Coloniaux in Belgian Congo, where she was renamed Vivi. Her final disposition is unknown.
