= USS Pride =

1943 Edsall-class destroyer escort

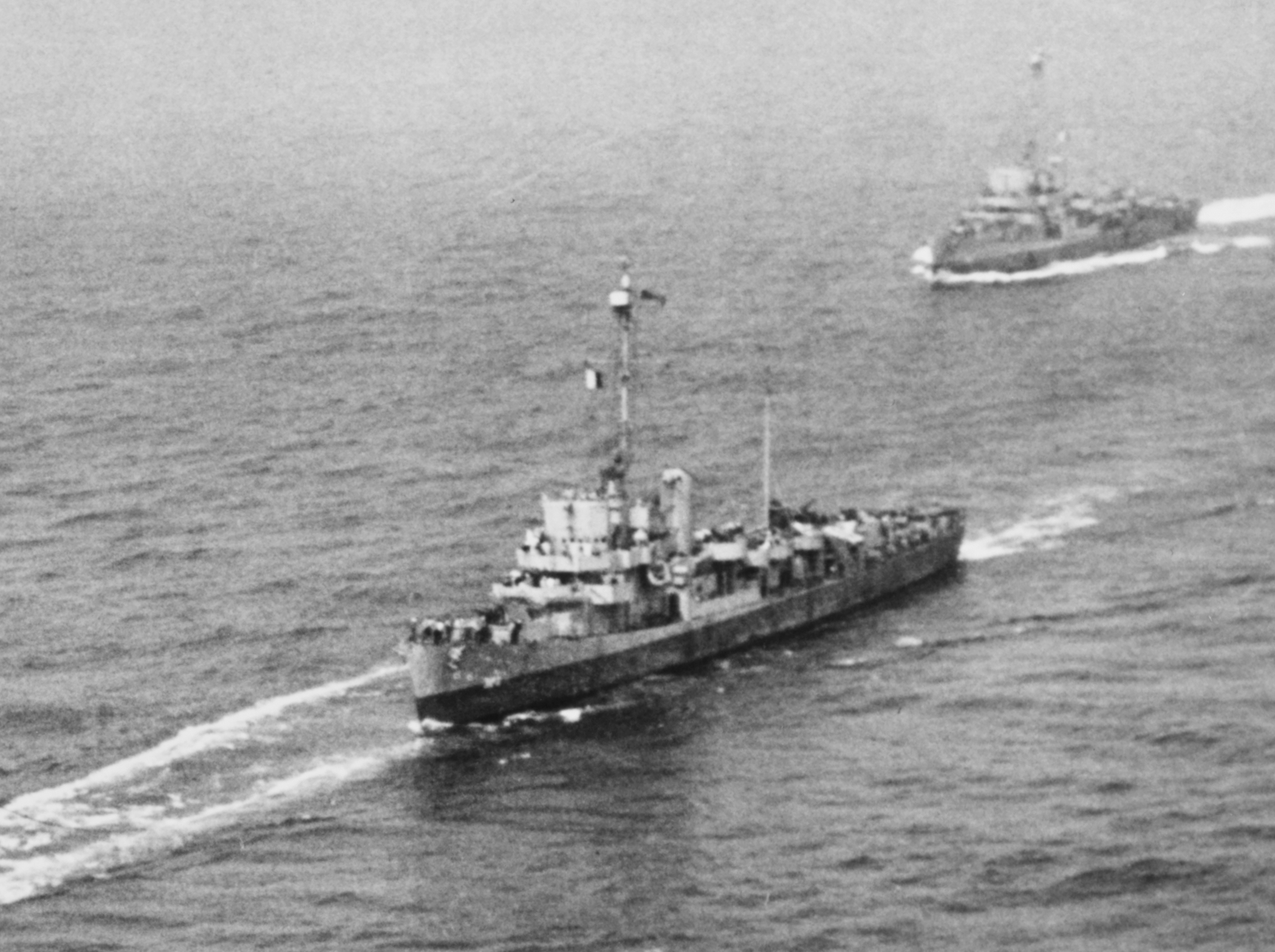

History

United States
- Namesake: Lewis Bailey Pride, Jr.
- Builder: Consolidated Steel Corporation, Orange, Texas
- Laid down: 12 April 1943
- Launched: 3 July 1943
- Commissioned: 13 November 1943
- Decommissioned: 1 June 1954
- Stricken: 2 January 1971
- Fate: Sold for scrapping 30 January 1974

United States
- Name: USCGC Pride (WDE-423)
- Commissioned: 20 July 1951
- Decommissioned: 1 June 1954
- Fate: Returned to USN, 1 June 1954

General characteristics
- Class & type: Edsall-class destroyer escort
- Displacement: 1,253 tons standard; 1,590 tons full load
- Length: 306 feet (93.27 m)
- Beam: 36.58 feet (11.15 m)
- Draft: 10.42 full load feet (3.18 m)
- Propulsion: 4 FM diesel engines, 4 diesel-generators, 6,000 shp (4.5 MW), 2 screws
- Speed: 21 knots (39 km/h)
- Range: 9,100 nmi. at 12 knots; (17,000 km at 22 km/h)
- Complement: 8 officers, 201 enlisted
- Armament: 3 × single 3 in (76 mm)/50 guns; 1 × twin 40 mm AA guns; 8 × single 20 mm AA guns; 1 × triple 21 in (533 mm) torpedo tubes; 8 × depth charge projectors; 1 × depth charge projector (hedgehog); 2 × depth charge tracks

USS Pride (DE-323) was an Edsall-class destroyer escort built for the U.S. Navy during World War II. She served in the Atlantic Ocean the Pacific Ocean and provided destroyer escort protection against submarine and air attack for Navy vessels and convoys. She returned home at war's end with three battle stars and then entered into service for the U.S. Coast Guard before final decommissioning.

== Namesake ==
Lewis Bailey Pride, Jr. was born on 22 April 1919 in Miami, Florida. He appointed Midshipman from Kentucky 23 June 1937. He was commissioned an Ensign 7 February 1941, and reported on board USS Oklahoma on 13 March 1941. He was killed in the Japanese Attack on Pearl Harbor, 7 December 1941.

== Construction and commissioning ==
She was laid down by the Consolidated Steel Co., Orange, Texas, 12 April 1943; launched 3 July 1943; sponsored by Mrs. Lewis Bailey Pride, mother of Lewis Bailey Pride, Jr.; and commissioned 13 November 1943.

== World War II North Atlantic operations ==
After shakedown off Bermuda, Pride spent the next twelve months escorting six convoys into the Mediterranean. On 20 April 1944 during the second voyage German planes attacked Convoy UGS–38 at dusk off Algiers, and sank five ships, including a transport carrying 500 soldiers, and destroyer USS Lansdale (DD-426).

== Sinking German Submarine U-371 ==
On the return voyage Pride together with USS Joseph E. Campbell, the French frigate Sénégalais and HMS Blankney sank the German submarine U-371, taking 49 prisoners on 4 May 1944.

== Sinking of German Submarine U-866 ==
On 1 March 1945, she was assigned hunter killer work with three other ships of her division, the group sinking U-866 off Halifax. She then joined a North Atlantic escort carrier group assigned to search out and destroy U-boats before they gained access to the shipping lanes. By the end of European hostilities, 5 of the 6 submarines known to be in the area were destroyed. The 6th surrendered shortly after V-E Day.

She then escorted two transports to Liverpool, whence she steamed back across the Atlantic to Panama where she conducted submarine training exercises until late in 1945.

== Decommissioning ==
On 29 December she reported to the Atlantic Reserve Fleet at Green Cove Springs, Florida. On 26 April 1946 Pride decommissioned at Green Cove Springs. In 1961 she was moved to Orange, Texas. She was struck from the Navy List on 2 January 1971 and sold for scrapping 30 January 1974.

== Awards ==
Pride earned three battle stars for World War II service.
