= USS Lowe =

US naval vessel (1943–1968)

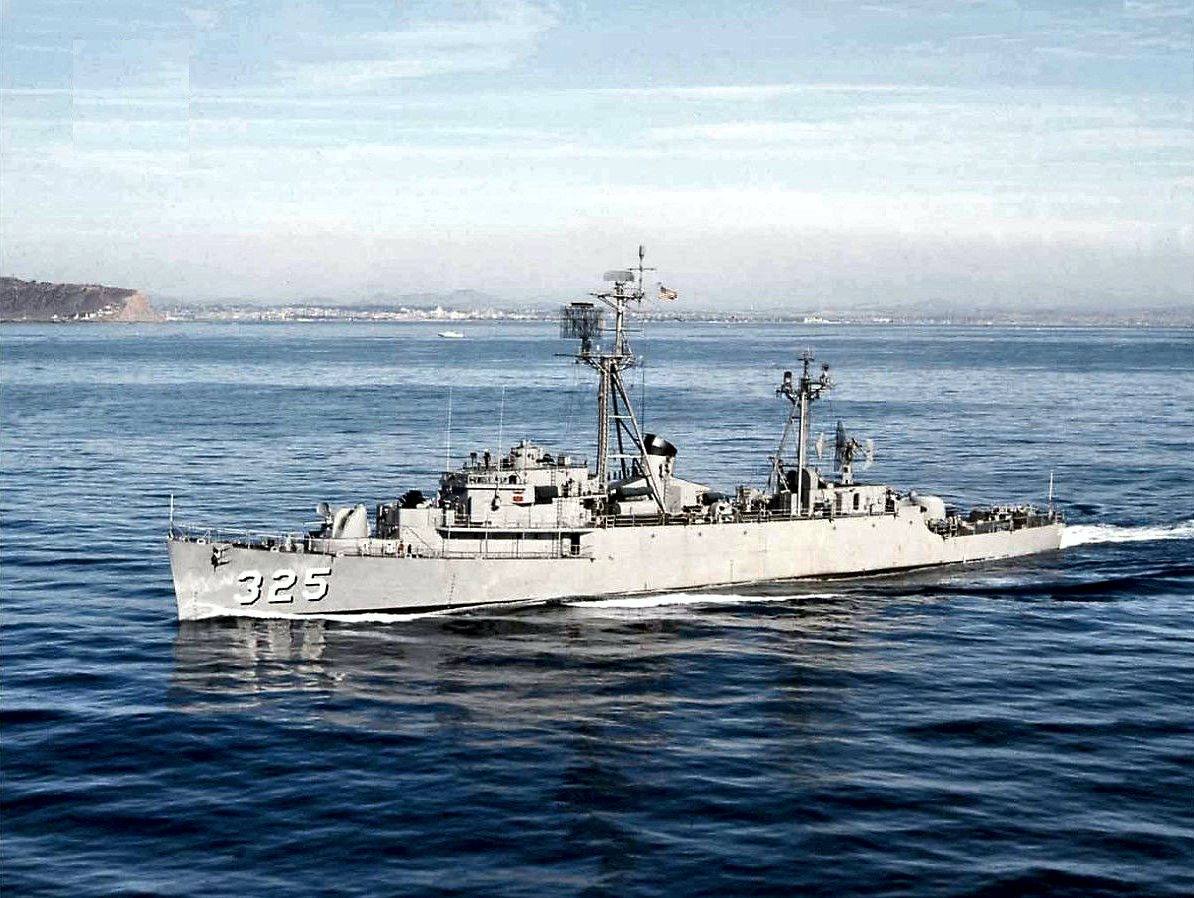

History

United States
- Namesake: Harry James Lowe
- Builder: Consolidated Steel Corporation, Orange, Texas
- Laid down: 24 May 1943
- Launched: 28 July 1943
- Commissioned: 22 November 1943
- Decommissioned: 20 September 1968
- Reclassified: DER-325, 28 October 1954
- Stricken: 23 September 1968
- Fate: Sold for scrapping 3 September 1969

General characteristics
- Class & type: Edsall-class destroyer escort
- Displacement: 1,253 tons standard; 1,590 tons full load
- Length: 306 feet (93.27 m)
- Beam: 36.58 feet (11.15 m)
- Draft: 10.42 full load feet (3.18 m)
- Propulsion: 4 FM diesel engines, 4 diesel-generators, 6,000 shp (4.5 MW), 2 screws
- Speed: 21 knots (39 km/h)
- Range: 9,100 nmi. at 12 knots; (17,000 km at 22 km/h)
- Complement: 8 officers, 201 enlisted
- Armament: 3 × single 3 in (76 mm)/50 guns; 1 × twin 40 mm AA guns; 8 × single 20 mm AA guns; 1 × triple 21 in (533 mm) torpedo tubes; 8 × depth charge projectors; 1 × depth charge projector (hedgehog); 2 × depth charge tracks

USS Lowe (DE-325) was an Edsall-class destroyer escort in service with the United States Navy from 1943 to 1946 and from 1955 to 1968. Between 1951 and 1954 she was loaned to the U.S. Coast Guard as USCGC Lowe (WDE-425). She was scrapped in 1969.

== Namesake ==
Harry James Lowe Jr. was born on 6 January 1922 in Paducah, Kentucky. He entered naval service as a seaman apprentice 28 August 1940. He served on the USS San Francisco from 6 December 1940 to 12 November 1942, when he was killed in action off the Solomon Islands when he refused to abandon his gun in the face of an onrushing Japanese torpedo plane. Gunner's Mate Third Class Lowe was posthumously awarded the Navy Cross.

== History ==
The ship was laid down by Consolidated Steel Corp., Orange, Texas, 24 May 1943; launched 28 July 1943; sponsored by Mrs. Harry J. Lowe, the namesake's mother; and commissioned 22 November 1943.

=== World War II ===
After a shakedown cruise to Bermuda, Lowe reported for convoy duty 2 February 1944 and departed Charleston, South Carolina, escorting convoy UGS 32 to Casablanca, French Morocco, and back. On her second such assignment, Lowe went into action 20 April when her convoy came under tenacious enemy air attack off the North African coast. Simultaneously, two high speed wakes made directly for the starboard side of the ship. She evaded the torpedoes by a hard right turn which enabled her to escape between the oncoming warheads.

Lowe continued convoy escort service making a total of 12 Atlantic crossings until 5 March 1945 when she joined TG 22.14, an exclusively U.S. Coast Guard “hunter-killer” group, with the specific mission of finding and destroying an enemy submarine operating due east of Newfoundland.

While steaming in search of the enemy 18 March 100 miles east of Halifax, Lowe made sonar contact and attacked with two patterns of hedgehogs. The depth charge attacks with those of other ships of the group brought an oil slick and large amounts of debris to the surface. The submarine was still on the bottom the following day when Lowe reestablished sound contact. Postwar investigation verified the destruction of U-866 by this group; Lowe received credit for the kill, and her commanding officer and four other crew members received awards for their part in the action. While serving with task group TG 22.14 3 May, Lowe rescued the crew of the foundered Newfoundland schooner Marion Duffitt and her guns sank the hulk, which was a menace to navigation.

Commencing 6 July, the ship assumed duties as a training vessel at Norfolk, Virginia, departing only to participate in the Navy Day observance at Washington, D.C., 24 October. Departing the Capital 1 November, she offloaded ammunition at Yorktown, Virginia, and 30 December arrived at St. Johns River, Florida, headquarters of the Florida Group, 16th Fleet, U.S. Atlantic Fleet, where she decommissioned 1 May 1946 and entered the Reserve Fleet.

=== U.S. Coast Guard weather ship ===
Recommissioned 20 July 1951 as USCGC Lowe (WDE-425), she saw service as a weather ship in the Atlantic and Pacific Oceans. She decommissioned a second time 1 June 1954 at the Todd Shipyard, Long Beach, California.

=== Radar picket ship ===
She was recommissioned in the Navy at Long Beach Naval Shipyard after being converted to a radar picket escort vessel. Lowe joined Escort Squadron 5 at Seattle, Washington.

She saw extended duty with the North American Air Defense Command as a unit of the seaward extension of the DEW line, eventually completing 67 tours as a picket vessel. While on station 20 February 1962, she was an emergency rescue link for Lt. Col. John Glenn's three orbit space mission.

At the disestablishment of the Radar Barrier 30 June 1965, Lowe sailed for the western Pacific and joined the U.S. 7th Fleet 5 August. Taking station off the coast of Vietnam 15 August, she was assigned the task of preventing seaborne infiltration of enemy elements to the south of that country as a part of Operation Market Time. In early September 1965, she returned to her new homeport, Guam, for a period of rest and upkeep. She rejoined task force TF 115 off Vietnam 22 November and resumed "Market Time" surveillance. When not a unit of TF 115, Lowe served as a unit of the Taiwan Patrol Force or as station ship Hong Kong.

=== Decommissioning and fate ===
This pattern of duty continued until 20 September 1968 when she decommissioned at Guam. Struck 23 September, Lowe began stripping in preparation for being sold for scrapping. LCDR Stephen W. Reszetar was her last commanding officer. She was then sold for scrapping 3 September 1969.
