= USS Joseph E. Campbell =

Buckley-class destroyer escort

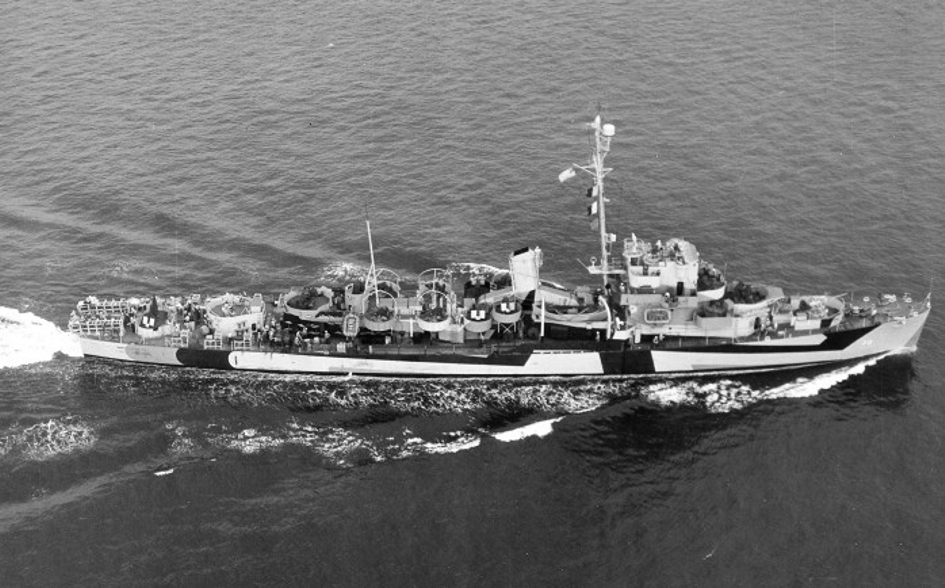
- USS Joseph E. Campbell in June 1944

History

United States
- Ordered: 1942
- Builder: Bethlehem-Hingham Shipyard
- Laid down: 29 March 1943
- Launched: 26 June 1943
- Commissioned: 23 September 1943
- Reclassified: APD-49, 24 November 1944
- Decommissioned: 15 November 1946
- Fate: Sold to Chile, 15 November 1966
- Stricken: 1 December 1966

History

Chile
- Name: Riquelme (APD-28)
- Acquired: 15 November 1966
- Fate: Used as parts hulk and scrapped

General characteristics
- Class & type: Buckley-class destroyer escort
- Displacement: 1,400 long tons (1,422 t) light; 1,740 long tons (1,768 t) standard
- Length: 306 ft (93 m)
- Beam: 37 ft (11 m)
- Draft: 9 ft 6 in (2.90 m) standard; 11 ft 3 in (3.43 m) full load
- Propulsion: 2 × boilers; General Electric turbo-electric drive; 12,000 shp (8.9 MW); 2 × solid manganese-bronze 3,600 lb (1,600 kg) 3-bladed propellers, 8 ft 6 in (2.59 m) diameter, 7 ft 7 in (2.31 m) pitch; 2 × rudders; 359 tons fuel oil
- Speed: 23 knots (43 km/h; 26 mph)
- Range: 3,700 nmi (6,900 km) at 15 kn (28 km/h; 17 mph); 6,000 nmi (11,000 km) at 12 kn (22 km/h; 14 mph)
- Complement: 15 officers, 198 men
- Armament: 3 × 3"/50 caliber guns; 1 × quad 1.1"/75 caliber gun; 8 × single 20 mm guns; 1 × triple 21-inch (533 mm) torpedo tubes; 1 × Hedgehog anti-submarine mortar; 8 × K-gun depth charge projectors; 2 × depth charge tracks

USS Joseph E. Campbell (DE-70/APD-49), a Buckley-class destroyer escort of the United States Navy, was named in honor of Ensign Joseph Eugene Campbell (1919–1942), who was killed in action while engaging the enemy on 9 August 1942.

Joseph E. Campbell was laid down on 29 March 1943 at the Bethlehem Hingham Shipyard; launched on 26 June 1943, sponsored by Mrs. Marie S. Campbell, mother of Ensign Campbell; and commissioned on 23 September 1943.

== Service history ==
After shakedown off Bermuda, Joseph E. Campbell departed Boston, Massachusetts, on 11 October; and, after escorting a convoy to Derry, Northern Ireland, returned to New York on 16 December. Between 31 December 1943 and 8 October 1944, the destroyer escort made three convoy escort voyages to French North Africa.

Returning to New York from the last voyage on 8 October, conversion to a Charles Lawrence-class high speed transport began at Tompkinsville, Staten Island Naval Base, and Joseph E. Campbell was reclassified APD-49 on 24 November 1944. After exercises and training along the East Coast, the high speed transport departed Key West on 8 March 1945, arriving at Pearl Harbor on 8 April via the Panama Canal and San Diego. Departing Pearl Harbor on 29 April, she steamed to Eniwetok, where she rendezvoused with two merchant ships and escorted them to Leyte.

For the next three months Joseph E. Campbell served as anti-submarine screen for LST groups in and out of Okinawa. On 1 September, she departed Cebu Island, as part of the screen for occupation forces for Japan, where she arrived eight days later. Joseph E. Campbell continued her escort duties between Japan and the Philippines until returning to the East Coast in December. After visiting Philadelphia and Norfolk, Virginia, she steamed to Guantanamo Bay, Cuba, and San Juan, Puerto Rico, where she embarked passengers and returned to Morehead City, North Carolina, on 31 March 1946.

After visits to Philadelphia, Baltimore, and Hampton Roads, Joseph E. Campbell arrived at Charleston, South Carolina, on 22 May for inactivation. Secured for preservation, she was towed to Green Cove Springs, Florida, where she was decommissioned on 15 November 1946, and joined the Atlantic Reserve Fleet at Orange, Texas. Joseph E. Campbell was struck from the Navy List on 1 December 1966 after being sold to Chile in November 1966 and renamed Riquelme.

== In Chilean service ==
Sources differ as to the service of Riquelme in the Chilean Navy. While some sources state that Riquelme was an operational commissioned unit from 1966 until 1973, when she was used as a source of spare parts for her three sister ships; Serrano (APD-26) (ex-Odum), Orella (APD-27) (ex-Jack C. Robinson), and Virgilio Uribe (APD-29) (ex-Daniel T. Griffin), other sources claim that Riqulme was never an operational vessel in the Chilean Navy, being only used as a spares source.

== Awards ==
Joseph E. Campbell received one battle star for World War II service.
