= List of frigates of World War II =

This is a list of frigates of World War II. The list includes frigate-class ships, such as US Navy "destroyer escorts", and British "escort destroyers" and sloops but US Navy "escort destroyers", are destroyer-class vessels and found in that list.

For the Royal Navy, the distinction between frigate and destroyer was whether the vessel carried torpedo tubes. The Type III Hunt-class destroyers were equipped with torpedo tubes; all Hunt-class were capable of 27 knots compared to the 20 knots of the River-class frigates

The List of ships of World War II contains major military vessels of the war, arranged alphabetically and by type. The list includes armed vessels that served during the war and in the immediate aftermath, inclusive of localized ongoing combat operations, garrison surrenders, post-surrender occupation, colony re-occupation, troop and prisoner repatriation, to the end of 1945.

For smaller vessels, see also List of World War II ships of less than 1000 tons. Some uncompleted Axis ships are included, out of historic interest. Ships are designated to the country under which they operated for the longest period of the World War II, regardless of where they were built or previous service history.

== List ==
List of frigates of World War II
Ship	Operator	Class	Type	Displacement (tons)	First commissioned	Fate
Abercrombie	United States Navy	John C. Butler	destroyer escort	1,350	1 May 1944	decommissioned 1946, sunk as target 1968
Aberdeen	Royal Navy	Grimsby (Group 2)	sloop	990	17 September 1936	sold for scrap 16 December 1948
Acree	United States Navy	Cannon	destroyer escort	1,240	19 July 1943	decommissioned 1946, scrapped 1973
Actaeon	Royal Navy	Black Swan (Modified)	sloop	1,350	24 July 1946	to West Germany as Hipper 9 December 1958, sold for scrap 25 October 1967
Adrias	Royal Hellenic Navy	Hunt (Type III)	escort destroyer	1,050	5 August 1942	damaged by mine 22 October 1943, scrapped 1945
Affleck	Royal Navy	Captain (TE type)	frigate	1,400	29 September 1943	constructive loss 26 December 1944, sold for scrap 24 January 1947
Afonso de Albuquerque	Portuguese Navy	Afonso de Albuquerque	aviso	1,811	28 May 1934	destroyed in combat 18 December 1961, sold for scrap 1962
Ahrens	United States Navy	Buckley	destroyer escort	1,400	12 February 1944	decommissioned 1946, scrapped 1967
Airedale	Royal Navy	Hunt (Type III)	escort destroyer	1,050	8 January 1942	sunk June 1942
Alacrity	Royal Navy	Black Swan (Modified)	sloop	1,350	13 April 1945	scrapped 15 September 1956
Albatros	Soviet Navy	Yastreb (Project 29K)	guard ship	891	29 September 1945	scrapped 28 February 1961
Albert T. Harris	United States Navy	John C. Butler	destroyer escort	1,350	29 November 1944	sunk as target 1969
Albuquerque	United States Navy; Soviet Navy	Tacoma	frigate	1,430	20 December 1943	to Soviet Union as EK-14 16 August 1945, returned to United States 1949, to Japan as Tochi 1953, returned to United States 1971
Albrighton	Royal Navy	Hunt (Type III)	escort destroyer	1,050	22 February 1942	paid off 6 January 1956
Aldenham	Royal Navy	Hunt (Type III)	escort destroyer	1,050	5 February 1942	sunk 14 December 1944
Alexander Hamilton	United States Coast Guard	Treasury	cutter	2,216	4 March 1937	sunk 29 January 1942
Alexander J. Luke	United States Navy	Buckley	destroyer escort	1,400	19 February 1944	decommissioned 1947, sunk as target 1970
Alger	United States Navy; Brazilian Navy	Cannon	destroyer escort	1,240	12 November 1943	To Brazil 10 March 1945 as Babitonga, scrapped 1964
Algérien	Free French Naval Forces	Cannon	destroyer escort	1,240	23 January 1944	to France after war, scrapped November 1965
Alvin C. Cockrell	United States Navy	John C. Butler	destroyer escort	1,350	7 October 1944	Sunk as target 1969
Amakusa	Imperial Japanese Navy	Etorofu	kaibōkan	870	20 November 1943	sunk 9 August 1945
Amesbury	United States Navy	Buckley	destroyer escort	1,400	31 August 1943	sold for scrap, sank under tow 1962
Amethyst	Royal Navy	Black Swan (Modified)	sloop	1,350	2 November 1943	scrapped 19 January 1957
Amick	United States Navy	Cannon	destroyer escort	1,240	26 July 1943	To Japan 1955, to Philippines 1976, scrapped 1989
Amiral Charner	French Navy	Bougainville	aviso	1,938	20 April 1934	scuttled 10 March 1945
Amiral Murgescu	Royal Romanian Navy	Amiral Murgescu	destroyer escort	812	2 March 1941	to Soviet Union as Don 1944, sold for scrap 4 July 1988
Andres	United States Navy	Evarts	destroyer escort	1,140	15 March 1943	decommissioned 1945, scrapped 1946
Anguilla	Royal Navy	Colony	frigate	1,264	15 October 1943	Returned to USN 31 May 1946; scrapped 1949
Annan	Royal Canadian Navy	River	frigate	1,445	13 January 1944	paid off 20 June 1945
Antigonish	Royal Canadian Navy	River	frigate	1,445	4 July 1944	paid off 30 November 1966
Antigua	Royal Navy	Colony	frigate	1,264	4 November 1943	Returned to USN 2 May 1946
Ascension	Royal Navy	Colony	frigate	1,264	24 November 1943	Returned to USN 31 May 1946
Atherstone	Royal Navy	Hunt (Type I)	escort destroyer	1,000	23 March 1940	paid off 23 September 1945, scrapped 1957
Atherton	United States Navy	Cannon	destroyer escort	1,240	29 August 1943	To Japan 1955, to Philippines 1976, active as of 2012
Auckland	Royal Navy	Egret	sloop	1,200	16 November 1938	sunk 24 June 1941
Austin	United States Navy	Evarts	destroyer escort	1,140	13 February 1943	decommissioned 1945, scrapped 1947
Avon Vale	Royal Navy	Hunt (Type II)	escort destroyer	1,050	17 February 1941	scrapped 1958
Awaji	Imperial Japanese Navy	Mikura	kaibōkan	940	25 January 1944	sunk 2 June 1944
Aylmer	Royal Navy	Captain (TE type)	frigate	1,400	30 September 1943	returned to USN 5 November 1945, sold for scrap 9 June 1947
Badsworth	Royal Navy; Royal Norwegian Navy	Hunt (Type II)	escort destroyer	1,050	18 August 1941	paid off 16 November 1944, to Norway as Arendal 8 August 1944
Bahamas	Royal Navy	Colony	frigate	1,264	6 December 1943	Returned to USN 11 June 1946
Baker	United States Navy	Cannon	destroyer escort	1,240	23 December 1943	to France 1952, sunk as target 1970
Balfour	Royal Navy	Captain (TE type)	frigate	1,400	7 October 1943	returned to USN 25 October 1945, sold 28 October 1946
Bangust	United States Navy	Cannon	destroyer escort	1,240	30 October 1943	to Peru 1952, scrapped 1979
Banff	Royal Navy	Banff	sloop	2,075	12 April 1930	Launched with Royal Navy, transferred back to USCG on 27 May 1947, sold 16 February 1959
Barbados	Royal Navy	Colony	frigate	1,264	18 December 1943	Returned to USN 11 June 1946
Barber	United States Navy	Buckley	destroyer escort	1,400	10 October 1943	to Mexico 1969, struck 2001
Baron	United States Navy	Cannon	destroyer escort	1,240	5 July 1943	to Uruguay 1952, scrapped 1990
Barr	United States Navy	Buckley	destroyer escort	1,400	16 February 1944	sunk as target 1963
Bartolomeu Dias	Portuguese Navy	Afonso de Albuquerque	aviso	1,811	1934	hulked 1965
Bates	United States Navy	Buckley	destroyer escort	1,400	13 September 1943	sunk by kamikazes 25 May 1945
Bauru	United States Navy; Brazilian Navy	Cannon	destroyer escort	1,240	11 October 1943	to Brazil 16 August 1944, paid off 17 September 1981, museum ship
Bayntun	Royal Navy	Captain (GMT type)	frigate	1,140	13 February 1943	returned to USN 22 August 1945, sold for scrap 17 June 1947
Bazely	Royal Navy	Captain (GMT type)	frigate	1,140	18 February 1943	returned to USN 20 August 1945, scrapped 28 May 1946
Bditelny	Soviet Navy	Yastreb (Project 29)	guard ship	829		laid down 23 May 1940, never completed and scrapped
Beacon Hill	Royal Canadian Navy	River	frigate	1,445	16 May 1944	paid off 15 September 1967
Beaufort	Royal Navy	Hunt (Type II)	escort destroyer	1,000	3 November 1941	scrapped 1965
Beautemps-Beaupré	French Navy	Bougainville	aviso	1,938	Never commissioned	scuttled 24 June 1940
Bebas	United States Navy	Evarts	destroyer escort	1,140	15 May 1943	decommissioned 1945, scrapped 1947
Beberibe	United States Navy; Brazilian Navy	Cannon	destroyer escort	1,240	6 October 1943	to Brazil 1 August 1944, paid off 1968
Belvoir	Royal Navy	Hunt (Type III)	escort destroyer	1,050	29 March 1942	paid off 1957, scrapped 21 October 1957
Benevente	United States Navy; Brazilian Navy	Cannon	destroyer escort	1,240	23 October 1943	to Brazil 19 December 1944, paid off 1964
Bentinck	Royal Navy	Captain (TE type)	frigate	1,400	19 May 1943	returned to USN 5 January 1946, sold for scrap June 1946
Bentley	Royal Navy	Captain (TE type)	frigate	1,400	14 October 1943	returned to USN 5 November 1945, sold for scrap 17 June 1947
Berkeley	Royal Navy	Hunt (Type I)	escort destroyer	1,000	6 June 1940	scuttled 19 August 1942
Berry	Royal Navy	Captain (GMT type)	frigate	1,140	15 February 1943	returned to USN 15 February 1946, sold for scrap 9 November 1946
Bertioga	United States Navy; Brazilian Navy	Cannon	destroyer escort	1,240	15 September 1943	to Brazil 1 August 1944, paid off 1964
Bibb	United States Coast Guard	Treasury	cutter	2,216	10 March 1937	decommissioned 1985, sunk as artificial reef 1987
Bicester	Royal Navy	Hunt (Type II)	escort destroyer	1,050	9 May 1942	paid off 1955, scrapped 1956
Bickerton	Royal Navy	Captain (TE type)	frigate	1,400	17 October 1943	sunk 22 August 1944
Bideford	Royal Navy	Shoreham	sloop	1,105	23 February 1932	sold for scrap 14 September 1949
Bittern	Royal Navy	Bittern	sloop	1,190	15 March 1938	sunk 30 April 1940
Bivin	United States Navy	John C. Butler	destroyer escort	1,350	31 October 1944	decommissioned 1947, sunk as target 1969
Black Swan	Royal Navy	Black Swan	sloop	1,250	27 January 1940	sold for scrap 13 September 1956
Blackmore	Royal Navy	Hunt (Type II)	escort destroyer	1,050	14 April 1942	
Blackwood	Royal Navy	Captain (GMT type)	frigate	1,140	27 March 1943	torpedoed 15 June and foundered 16 June 1944
Blair	United States Navy	Edsall	destroyer escort	1,250	13 September 1943	decommissioned 1960, scrapped 1972
Blankney	Royal Navy	Hunt (Type II)	escort destroyer	1,050	11 April 1941	scrapped 1958
Blean	Royal Navy	Hunt (Type III)	escort destroyer	1,050	23 August 1942	sunk 11 December 1942 by U-443
Bleasdale	Royal Navy	Hunt (Type III)	escort destroyer	1,050	16 April 1942	paid off 1956, scrapped 14 September 1956
Blencathra	Royal Navy	Hunt (Type II)	escort destroyer	1,050	14 December 1940	paid off July 1948, scrapped 1957
Blessman	United States Navy	Buckley	destroyer escort	1,400	19 September 1943	to Taiwan as ROCS Chung Shan 1967, scrapped 1995
Bligh	Royal Navy	Captain (TE type)	frigate	1,400	22 October 1943	returned to USN 12 November 1945, sold for scrap 13 June 1946
Bocaina	United States Navy; Brazilian Navy	Cannon	destroyer escort	1,240	3 September 1943	to Brazil 20 March 1945, paid off 1975
Booth	United States Navy	Cannon	destroyer escort	1,240	19 September 1943	to Philippines 1967, lost in typhoon 1981
Borum	United States Navy	Buckley	destroyer escort	1,400	30 November 1943	decommissioned 1946, scrapped 1966
Bostwick	United States Navy	Cannon	destroyer escort	1,240	1 December 1943	to Republic of China 1948, scrapped 1972
Bougainville	French Navy	Bougainville	aviso	1,938	15 February 1933	sunk 9 November 1940
Bowers	United States Navy	Buckley	destroyer escort	1,400	27 January 1944	to Philippines 1961
Brackett	United States Navy	Evarts	destroyer escort	1,140	18 October 1943	decommissioned 1945, scrapped 1947
Bracui	United States Navy; Brazilian Navy	Cannon	destroyer escort	1,240	29 September 1943	to Brazil 15 August 1944, paid off 11 July 1972
Braid	Royal Navy; Free French Naval Forces	River	frigate	1,370	21 January 1944	to Free French as Aventure 21 January 1944, paid off 1964
Braithwaite	Royal Navy	Captain (TE type)	frigate	1,400	13 November 1943	returned to USN 13 November 1945, sold for scrap June 1946
Bramham	Royal Navy	Hunt (Type II)	escort destroyer	1,050	16 June 1942	paid off March 1943, scrapped 1960
Bray	United States Navy	Rudderow	destroyer escort	1,450	4 September 1944	decommissioned 1946, sunk as target 1963
Brecon	Royal Navy	Hunt (Type IV)	escort destroyer	1,175	18 December 1942	Paid off 12 December 1945
Breeman	United States Navy	Cannon	destroyer escort	1,240	12 December 1943	to Republic of China 1948, scrapped 1972
Brennan	United States Navy	Evarts	destroyer escort	1,140	20 January 1943	decommissioned 1945, scrapped 1946
Bridgewater	Royal Navy	Bridgewater	sloop	1,045	14 March 1929	sold for scrap 22 May 1947
Bright	United States Navy	Cannon	destroyer escort	1,240	30 June 1944	to France 1950, scrapped 1965
Brinio	Royal Netherlands Navy	Brinio	gunboat	545	8 September 1914	scuttled 14 May 1940
Brissenden	Royal Navy	Hunt (Type IV)	escort destroyer	1,175	12 February 1943	Paid off 19 June 1948
Brister	United States Navy	Edsall	destroyer escort	1,250	30 November 1943	scrapped 1968
Brocklesby	Royal Navy	Hunt (Type II)	escort destroyer	1,050	9 April 1941	paid off 22 June 1963, scrapped 1968
Bronstein	United States Navy	Cannon	destroyer escort	1,240	13 December 1943	to Uruguay 1952, scrapped 1988
Brough	United States Navy	Edsall	destroyer escort	1,250	18 September 1943	scrapped 1967
Buckingham	Royal Canadian Navy	River	frigate	1,445	2 November 1944	paid off 23 March 1965
Buckley	United States Navy	Buckley	destroyer escort	1,400	30 April 1943	scrapped 1969
Bull	United States Navy	Buckley	destroyer escort	1,400	12 August 1943	to Taiwan 1966, scrapped 1995
Bullen	Royal Navy	Captain (TE type)	frigate	1,400	25 October 1943	sunk 6 December 1944
Bunch	United States Navy	Buckley	destroyer escort	1,400	21 August 1943	decommissioned 1946, scrapped 1965
Buran	Soviet Navy	Uragan (Series II)	guard ship	450	7 October 1935	paid off 1959
Burden R. Hastings	United States Navy	Evarts	destroyer escort	1,140	1 May 1943	decommissioned 1945, scrapped 1947
Burges	Royal Navy	Captain (GMT type)	frigate	1,140	2 June 1943	returned to USN 27 February 1946, sold for scrap 14 November 1946
Burke	United States Navy	Buckley	destroyer escort	1,400	20 July 1943	to Colombia 1968, scrapped 1974
Burrows	United States Navy	Cannon	destroyer escort	1,240	19 December 1943	to Netherlands 1950, scrapped 1968
Burya	Soviet Navy	Uragan (Series III)	guard ship	450	27 October 1936	sunk 24 August 1942
Byard	Royal Navy	Captain (TE type)	frigate	1,400	18 June 1943	returned to USN 12 February 1945, sold for scrap 1946
Byron	Royal Navy	Captain (TE type)	frigate	1,400	30 October 1943	returned to USN 24 November 1945, sold for scrap 25 October 1947
Cabana	United States Navy	Evarts	destroyer escort	1,140	9 July 1943	decommissioned 1946, scrapped 1947
Caicos	Royal Navy	Colony	frigate	1,264	31 December 1943	Returned to USN 12 December 1945; sold to Argentina as Santísima Trinidad, later Comodoro Augusto Lasserre, sold and scrapped 1971
Calcaterra	United States Navy	Edsall	destroyer escort	1,250	17 November 1943	scrapped 1974
Calder	Royal Navy	Captain (TE type)	frigate	1,400	15 July 1943	returned to USN 19 October 1945, sold for scrap 15 January 1948
Calpe	Royal Navy	Hunt (Type II)	escort destroyer	1,050	11 December 1941	scrapped 1966
Campbell	United States Coast Guard	Treasury	cutter	2,216	16 June 1936	decommissioned 1982, sunk as target 1984
Camp	United States Navy	Edsall	destroyer escort	1,250	16 September 1943	to South Vietnam 1971, to Philippines 1976
Canfield	United States Navy	Evarts	destroyer escort	1,140	22 July 1943	decommissioned 1945, scrapped 1947
Cannon	United States Navy; Brazilian Navy	Cannon	destroyer escort	1,240	26 September 1943	to Brazil 19 December 1944 as Baependi
Cap de la Madeleine	Royal Canadian Navy	River	frigate	1,445	30 September 1944	paid off 15 May 1965
Cape Breton	Royal Canadian Navy	River	frigate	1,445	25 October 1943	paid off 26 January 1946
Capel	Royal Navy	Captain (GMT type)	frigate	1,140	16 August 1943	sunk 26 December 1944
Capilano	Royal Canadian Navy	River	frigate	1,445	25 August 1944	paid off 24 November 1945
Căpitan Dumitrescu Constantin	Royal Romanian Navy	Friponne	gunboat	344	1918	to Soviet Union as Araks September 1944, sunk 10 January 1945
Carlplace	Royal Canadian Navy	River	frigate	1,445	13 December 1944	paid off 13 December 1945
Carlson	United States Navy	Evarts	destroyer escort	1,140	10 May 1943	decommissioned 1945, scrapped 1946
Carroll	United States Navy	Cannon	destroyer escort	1,240	24 October 1943	decommissioned 1946, scrapped 1966
Carter	United States Navy	Cannon	destroyer escort	1,240	3 May 1944	to Republic of China 1948, scrapped 1973
Cates	United States Navy	Cannon	destroyer escort	1,240	15 December 1943	to France 1950, scrapped 1959
Catterick	Royal Navy	Hunt (Type III)	escort destroyer	1,050	12 June 1942	Sold to Greece as Hastings 1946, scrapped 20 November 1963
Cattistock	Royal Navy	Hunt (Type I)	escort destroyer	1,000	22 July 1940	paid off 26 March 1946, scrapped 1957
Cauvery	Royal Indian Navy	Black Swan (Modified)	sloop	1,350	26 August 1943	renamed INS Kaveri 1968, sold for scrap 1979
Cayman	Royal Navy	Colony	frigate	1,264	20 January 1944	Returned to USN 23 April 1946
Cecil J. Doyle	United States Navy	John C. Butler	destroyer escort	1,350	16 October 1944	decommissioned 1946, sunk as target 1967
Cetatea Albă	Royal Romanian Navy	Amiral Murgescu	destroyer escort	812		completed 1940, further status unknown
Chaffee	United States Navy	Rudderow	destroyer escort	1,450	9 May 1944	decommissioned 1946, scrapped 1948
Chambers	United States Navy	Edsall	destroyer escort	1,250	24 November 1943	scrapped 1975
Chanticleer	Royal Navy	Black Swan (Modified)	sloop	1,350	29 March 1943	converted into base ship as Lusitania after torpedoed, scrapped 1945
Charles E. Brannon	United States Navy	John C. Butler	destroyer escort	1,350	1 November 1944	decommissioned 1960, scrapped 1969
Charles J. Kimmel	United States Navy	Rudderow	destroyer escort	1,450	20 April 1944	decommissioned 1947, sunk as target 1969
Charles Lawrence	United States Navy	Buckley	destroyer escort	1,400	31 May 1943	scrapped 1965
Charles R. Greer	United States Navy	Evarts	destroyer escort	1,140	25 June 1943	decommissioned 1945, scrapped 1947
Charleston	United States Navy	Erie	gunboat	2,000	8 July 1936	decommissioned 10 May 1946, served as training ship until 1959
Charlottetown (II)	Royal Canadian Navy	River	frigate	1,445	28 April 1944	paid off 25 March 1947
Chase	United States Navy	Buckley	destroyer escort	1,400	18 July 1943	scrapped 1946
Chatelain	United States Navy	Edsall	destroyer escort	1,250	22 September 1943	scrapped 1974
Chautauqua	United States Coast Guard	Owasco	cutter	2,010	4 August 1945	decommissioned 1973, scrapped 1974
Chebogue	Royal Canadian Navy	River	frigate	1,445	22 February 1944	paid off 25 September 1945
Chester T. O'Brien	United States Navy	John C. Butler	destroyer escort	1,350	3 July 1944	decommissioned 1960, scrapped 1974
Chiburi	Imperial Japanese Navy	Mikura	kaibōkan	940	3 April 1944	sunk 12 January 1945
Chiddingfold	Royal Navy	Hunt (Type II)	escort destroyer	1,050	16 October 1941	to India as Ganga April 1952, scrapped 1975
Christopher	United States Navy; Brazilian Navy	Cannon	destroyer escort	1,240	23 October 1943	to Brazil 19 December 1944 as Benevente
Clarence L. Evans	United States Navy	Cannon	destroyer escort	1,240	25 June 1944	to France 1952, scrapped 1960
Cleveland	Royal Navy	Hunt (Type I)	escort destroyer	1,000	18 September 1940	paid off 26 March 1946, scrapped 14 December 1959
Clive	Royal Indian Navy		sloop	2,083	20 April 1920	scrapped 1947
Cloues	United States Navy	Evarts	destroyer escort	1,140	10 August 1943	decommissioned 1945, scrapped 1947
Coates	United States Navy	Rudderow	destroyer escort	1,450	24 January 1944	decommissioned 1970, sunk as target 1971
Coaticook	Royal Canadian Navy	River	frigate	1,445	25 July 1944	paid off 29 November 1945
Cockrill	United States Navy	Edsall	destroyer escort	1,250	24 December 1943	decommissioned 1946, sunk as target 1974
Cofer	United States Navy	Buckley	destroyer escort	1,400	18 January 1944	decommissioned 1946, scrapped 1968
Coffman	United States Navy	Cannon	destroyer escort	1,240	27 December 1943	decommissioned 1946, scrapped 1973
Conklin	United States Navy	John C. Butler	destroyer escort	1,350	21 April 1944	decommissioned 1946, scrapped 1972
Conn	Royal Navy	Captain (TE type)	frigate	1,400	31 October 1943	returned to USN 26 November 1945, sold for scrap 21 January 1948
Connolly	United States Navy	Evarts	destroyer escort	1,140	8 July 1944	decommissioned 1945, scrapped 1946
Cooke	Royal Navy	Captain (GMT type)	frigate	1,140	30 August 1943	returned to USN 5 March 1946, sold for scrap June 1947
Coolbaugh	United States Navy	Buckley	destroyer escort	1,400	15 October 1943	decommissioned 1960, scrapped 1973
Cooner	United States Navy	Cannon	destroyer escort	1,240	21 August 1943	decommissioned 1946, scrapped 1973
Corbesier	United States Navy	John C. Butler	destroyer escort	1,350	31 March 1944	decommissioned 1946, scrapped 1974
Cornwallis	Royal Indian Navy	Aubrietia	sloop	1,290	1917	scrapped 1946
Cosby	Royal Navy	Captain (TE type)	frigate	1,400	20 December 1943	returned to USN 4 March 1946, sold for scrap 5 November 1946
Cotswold	Royal Navy	Hunt (Type I)	escort destroyer	1,050	16 November 1940	paid off 1946, scrapped 1957
Cottesmore	Royal Navy	Hunt (Type I)	escort destroyer	1,050	29 December 1940	to Egypt as Ibrahim El Awal 17 May 1950, renamed Mohammed Ali el Kebir 1951, renamed Port Said 1971, converted to accommodation hulk 1986
Cotton	Royal Navy	Captain (TE type)	frigate	1,400	8 November 1943	returned to USN 5 November 1945, sold for scrap 1946
Cowdray	Royal Navy	Hunt (Type II)	escort destroyer	1,050	29 July 1942	paid off January 1950, scrapped 1959
Crane	Royal Navy	Black Swan (Modified)	sloop	1,350	10 May 1943	scrapped March 1965
Cranstoun	Royal Navy	Captain (TE type)	frigate	1,400	13 November 1943	returned to USN 3 December 1945, sold for scrap 20 November 1947
Cronin	United States Navy	Buckley	destroyer escort	1,400	5 May 1944	sunk as target 1971
Croome	Royal Navy	Hunt (Type II)	escort destroyer	1,000	29 June 1941	paid off October 1945, scrapped 1957
Cross	United States Navy	John C. Butler	destroyer escort	1,350	8 January 1945	decommissioned 1958, scrapped 1968
Crouter	United States Navy	Evarts	destroyer escort	1,140	25 May 1943	decommissioned 1945, scrapped 1947
Crowley	United States Navy	Evarts	destroyer escort	1,140	25 March 1944	decommissioned 1945, scrapped 1946
Cuba	Cuban Constitutional Navy		sloop	2,055	c.1911	stricken 1971
Cubitt	Royal Navy	Captain (TE type)	frigate	1,400	17 November 1943	returned to USN 4 March 1946, sold for scrap 4 March 1947
Currier	United States Navy	Buckley	destroyer escort	1,400	1 February 1944	sunk as target 1967
Curzon	Royal Navy	Captain (TE type)	frigate	1,400	20 November 1943	returned to USN 27 March 1946, sold for scrap 4 November 1946
Cygnet	Royal Navy	Black Swan (Modified)	sloop	1,350	1 December 1942	scrapped 16 March 1956
D'Entrecasteaux	French Navy; Free French Naval Forces	Bougainville	aviso	1,938	15 February 1933	scrapped 19 October 1948
D'Iberville	French Navy	Bougainville	aviso	1,938	22 September 1935	scuttled 27 November 1942, scrapped 1956
Dacres	Royal Navy	Captain (GMT type)	frigate	1,140	28 August 1943	returned to USN 26 January 1946, sold for scrap 14 December 1946
Daitō	Imperial Japanese Navy	Hiburi	kaibōkan	940	7 August 1944	sunk 16 November 1945
Dakins	Royal Navy	Captain (TE type)	frigate	1,400	23 November 1943	constructive loss 25 December 1944, sold for scrap 9 January 1947
Dale W. Peterson	United States Navy	Edsall	destroyer escort	1,250	17 February 1944	decommissioned 1946, scrapped 1972
Damon M. Cummings	United States Navy	Buckley	destroyer escort	1,400	29 June 1944	decommissioned 1947, scrapped 1973
Daniel	United States Navy	Edsall	destroyer escort	1,250	24 January 1944	decommissioned 1946, scrapped 1974
Daniel A. Joy	United States Navy	Rudderow	destroyer escort	1,450	28 April 1944	decommissioned 1965, scrapped 1966
Daniel T. Griffin	United States Navy	Buckley	destroyer escort	1,400	9 June 1943	to Chile 1966
Darby	United States Navy	Buckley	destroyer escort	1,400	15 November 1943	sunk as target 1970
Day	United States Navy	Rudderow	destroyer escort	1,450	10 June 1944	decommissioned 1946, sunk as target 1969
Deane	Royal Navy	Captain (TE type)	frigate	1,400	26 November 1943	returned to USN 4 March 1946, sold for scrap 7 November 1946
Decker	United States Navy; Republic of China Navy	Evarts	destroyer escort	1,140	3 May 1943	to Republic of China as Tai Ping 28 August 1945; sunk in action 1954
Deede	United States Navy	Evarts	destroyer escort	1,140	29 July 1943	decommissioned 1946, scrapped 1947
DeLong	United States Navy	Rudderow	destroyer escort	1,450	31 December 1943	decommissioned 1962, sunk as target 1970
Dempsey	United States Navy	Evarts	destroyer escort	1,140	23 July 1943	decommissioned 1945, scrapped 1947
Dennis	United States Navy	John C. Butler	destroyer escort	1,350	20 March 1944	decommissioned 1946, scrapped 1973
Deptford	Royal Navy	Grimsby (Group 1)	sloop	990	14 August 1935	sold for scrap 3 April 1948
Derwent	Royal Navy	Hunt (Type III)	escort destroyer	1,050	24 April 1942	scrapped 1947
Diana	Regia Marina		aviso	1,736	12 November 1940	sunk 29 June 1942
Dionne	United States Navy	Evarts	destroyer escort	1,140	16 July 1943	decommissioned 1946, scrapped 1947
Dobler	United States Navy	Evarts	destroyer escort	1,140	17 May 1943	decommissioned 1945, scrapped 1946
Doherty	United States Navy	Evarts	destroyer escort	1,140	6 February 1943	decommissioned 1945, scrapped 1946
Domett	Royal Navy	Captain (GMT type)	frigate	1,140	3 September 1943	returned to USN 5 March 1946, sold for scrap 3 June 1947
Dominica	Royal Navy	Colony	frigate	1,264	25 January 1944	
Donaldson	United States Navy	Evarts	destroyer escort	1,140	1 December 1943	decommissioned 1945, scrapped 1946
Doneff	United States Navy	Evarts	destroyer escort	1,140	10 June 1943	decommissioned 1945, scrapped 1947
Donnell	United States Navy	Buckley	destroyer escort	1,400	26 June 1943	damaged August 1943 and converted to power barge, scrapped 1946
Douglas A. Munro	United States Navy	John C. Butler	destroyer escort	1,350	11 July 1944	decommissioned 1960, sunk as target 1966
Douglas L. Howard	United States Navy	Edsall	destroyer escort	1,250	29 July 1943	decommissioned 1946, scrapped 1974
Doyle C. Barnes	United States Navy	John C. Butler	destroyer escort	1,350	13 July 1944	decommissioned 1947, scrapped 1973
Drury	Royal Navy	Captain (GMT type)	frigate	1,140	12 April 1943	returned to USN 20 August 1945, sold for scrap June 1946
Duane	United States Coast Guard	Treasury	cutter	2,216	1 August 1936	decommissioned 1985, sunk as artificial reef 1987
Duckworth	Royal Navy	Captain (TE type)	frigate	1,400	4 August 1943	returned to USN 17 December 1945, sold for scrap 29 May 1946
Duff	Royal Navy	Captain (TE type)	frigate	1,400	23 August 1943	constructive loss 30 November 1944, sold for scrap May 1947
Duffy	United States Navy	Evarts	destroyer escort	1,140	5 August 1943	decommissioned 1945, scrapped 1947
Dufilho	United States Navy	John C. Butler	destroyer escort	1,350	21 July 1944	decommissioned 1946, scrapped 1973
Dulverton	Royal Navy	Hunt (Type II)	escort destroyer	1,000	September 1941	scuttled on 13 November 1943
Dumont d'Urville	French Navy; Free French Naval Forces	Bougainville	aviso	1,938	4 June 1932	scrapped 26 March 1958
Dundee	Royal Navy	Shoreham	sloop	1,105	31 March 1933	Torpedoed and sunk 15 September 1940
Durant	United States Navy	Edsall	destroyer escort	1,250	17 February 1944	decommissioned 1964, scrapped 1974
Durik	United States Navy	Buckley	destroyer escort	1,400	16 November 1943	decommissioned 1946, scrapped 1967
Earl V. Johnson	United States Navy	Buckley	destroyer escort	1,400	18 March 1944	decommissioned 1946, scrapped 1968
Eastview	Royal Canadian Navy	River	frigate	1,445	3 June 1944	paid off 17 January 1946
Edgar G. Chase	United States Navy	Evarts	destroyer escort	1,140	5 August 1943	decommissioned 1945, scrapped 1947
Edmonds	United States Navy	John C. Butler	destroyer escort	1,350	3 April 1944	decommissioned 1965, sold for scrap 1973
Edsall	United States Navy	Edsall	destroyer escort	1,250	10 April 1943	decommissioned 1960, scrapped 1972
Edward C. Daly	United States Navy	Evarts	destroyer escort	1,140	3 April 1943	decommissioned 1945, scrapped 1946
Edward H. Allen	United States Navy	John C. Butler	destroyer escort	1,350	16 December 1943	decommissioned 1958, sold for scrap 1974
Edwin A. Howard	United States Navy	John C. Butler	destroyer escort	1,350	25 May 1944	decommissioned 1946, sold for scrap 1973
Eggesford	Royal Navy	Hunt (Type III)	escort destroyer	1,050	21 January 1943	paid off 1946
Eglinton	Royal Navy	Hunt (Type I)	escort destroyer	1,000	28 August 1940	paid off 1945, scrapped 1956
Egret	Royal Navy	Egret	sloop	1,200	10 November 1938	sunk 27 August 1943
Eichenberger	United States Navy	Buckley	destroyer escort	1,400	17 November 1943	decommissioned 1946, sold for scrap 1973
Eisele	United States Navy	Evarts	destroyer escort	1,140	18 October 1943	decommissioned 1945, scrapped 1948
Ekins	Royal Navy	Captain (TE type)	frigate	1,400	29 November 1943	constructive loss 16 April 1945, sold for scrap March 1947
Elden	United States Navy	Evarts	destroyer escort	1,140	4 August 1943	decommissioned 1946, scrapped 1947
Emery	United States Navy	Evarts	destroyer escort	1,140	14 August 1943	decommissioned 1945, scrapped 1947
Enchantress	Royal Navy	Bittern	sloop	1,085	8 April 1935	sold to mercantile as Lady Enchantress 1946, sold for scrap 1952
Engstrom	United States Navy	Evarts	destroyer escort	1,140	21 June 1943	decommissioned 1945, scrapped 1946
England	United States Navy	Buckley	destroyer escort	1,400	10 December 1943	sold and broken up, 26 November 1946
Enright	United States Navy	Buckley	destroyer escort	1,400	21 September 1943	to Ecuador as BAE 25 de Julio July 1967, scrapped 1989
Eridge	Royal Navy	Hunt (Type II)	escort destroyer	1,050	28 February 1941	scrapped 1946
Erie	United States Navy	Erie	gunboat	2,000	1 July 1936	capsized 5 December 1942, the wreck raised and scuttled 1952
Eritrea	Regia Marina		sloop	2,165	10 February 1937	ceded to France 1948, renamed Francis Garnier, expended as target 1966
Erne	Royal Navy	Black Swan	sloop	1,250	26 April 1941	scrapped October 1965
Eskdale	Royal Norwegian Navy	Hunt (Type III)	escort destroyer	1,050	31 July 1942	sunk 14 April 1943
Essington	Royal Navy	Captain (TE type)	frigate	1,400	7 September 1943	returned to USN 19 October 1946, sold for scrap 22 December 1947
Etorofu	Imperial Japanese Navy	Etorofu	kaibōkan	870	15 May 1943	scrapped 13 October 1947
Ettrick	Royal Navy; Royal Canadian Navy	River	frigate	1,445	11 July 1943	to Canada 29 January 1944, paid off 30 May 1945
Eugene E. Elmore	United States Navy	Rudderow	destroyer escort	1,450	4 February 1944	decommissioned 1946, sold for scrap 1969
Evarts	United States Navy	Evarts	destroyer escort	1,140	5 April 1943	decommissioned 1945, scrapped 1946
Eversole	United States Navy	John C. Butler	destroyer escort	1,350	21 March 1944	sunk 28 October 1944
Everett	United States Navy; Soviet Navy	Tacoma	frigate	1,430	22 January 1944	to Soviet Union as EK-15 16 August 1945, returned to United States 1949, to Japan as Kiri 1953, returned to United States 1976 and scrapped
Exmoor (L61)	Royal Navy	Hunt (Type I)	escort destroyer	1,000	18 October 1940	sunk by E-boat S-30, 25 February 1941.
Exmoor (L08)	Royal Navy	Hunt (Type II)	escort destroyer	1,050	18 October 1941	November 1945
F 1	Kriegsmarine	F	escort ship	712	15 December 1935	converted to tender ship and renamed as Jagd April 1942, to German Mine Sweeping Administration post-war, to France 1947 and scrapped
F 2	Kriegsmarine	F	escort ship	712	27 February 1936	to United Kingdom post-war, sunk 1946 and partly salvaged
F 3	Kriegsmarine	F	escort ship	712	7 March 1936	converted to tender ship and renamed as Hai, sunk 3 May 1945, refloated and scrapped 1948
F 4	Kriegsmarine	F	escort ship	712	5 April 1936	renamed as Koblenz and planned conversion to tender ship, to United Kingdom 1945 and scrapped
F 5	Kriegsmarine	F	escort ship	712	1 May 1936	sunk 29 January 1945
F 6	Kriegsmarine	F	escort ship	712	25 June 1936	converted to tender ship and renamed as Königin Luise 20 September 1939, sunk 30 March 1945, refloated and scrapped 1955
F 7	Kriegsmarine	F	escort ship	712	15 February 1937	to Soviet Union 1947
F 8	Kriegsmarine	F	escort ship	712	8 April 1937	to United States 1945, scrapped 1950
F 9	Kriegsmarine	F	escort ship	712	21 August 1937	sunk 14 December 1939
F 10	Kriegsmarine	F	escort ship	712	12 March 1938	to United States 1945, scrapped 1950
Fair	United States Navy	Evarts	destroyer escort	1,140	23 October 1943	decommissioned 1945, to US Army 1947, scrapped 1949
Falgout	United States Navy	Edsall	destroyer escort	1,250	15 November 1943	decommissioned 1946, commissioned into Coast Guard in 1951, returned to Navy in 1954, decommissioned again 1969, sunk as target 1977
Falmouth	Royal Navy	Shoreham	sloop	1,105	27 October 1932	transferred to RNVR as Calliope January 1952, scrapped 30 April 1968
Farndale	Royal Navy	Hunt (Type II)	escort destroyer	1,050	27 April 1941	scrapped 1962
Farquhar	United States Navy	Edsall	destroyer escort	1,250	5 August 1943	decommissioned 1946, sold for scrap 1974
Fechteler	United States Navy	Buckley	destroyer escort	1,400	1 July 1943	sunk 5 May 1944
Fessenden	United States Navy	Edsall	destroyer escort	1,250	25 August 1943	decommissioned 1960, sunk as target 1967
Fernie	Royal Navy	Hunt (Type I)	escort destroyer	1,000	29 May 1940	paid off 1947
Fieberling	United States Navy	Buckley	destroyer escort	1,400	11 April 1944	decommissioned 1948, sold for scrap 1972
Finch	United States Navy	Edsall	destroyer escort	1,250	13 December 1943	decommissioned 1946, commissioned into Coast Guard 1951, returned to Navy 1954, decommissioned again 1973, sold for scrap 1974
Finnegan	United States Navy	Evarts	destroyer escort	1,140	19 August 1944	decommissioned 1945, scrapped 1946
Fiske	United States Navy	Edsall	destroyer escort	1,250	25 August 1943	Sunk by German U-804 2 August 1944
Fitzroy	Royal Navy	Captain (TE type)	frigate	1,400	16 October 1943	returned to USN 5 January 1946, sold for scrap 23 May 1946
Flaherty	United States Navy	Edsall	destroyer escort	1,250	26 June 1943	decommissioned 1946, sold for scrap 1966
Flamingo	Royal Navy	Black Swan	sloop	1,250	3 November 1939	to West Germany as Graf Spee 21 January 1959, sold for scrap 25 October 1967
Fleetwood	Royal Navy	Grimsby (Group 2)	sloop	990	19 November 1936	scrapped 1959
Fleming	United States Navy	Evarts	destroyer escort	1,140	18 September 1943	decommissioned 1945, scrapped 1948
Flores	Royal Netherlands Navy	Flores	gunboat	1,457	25 March 1926	scrapped November 1968
Fogg	United States Navy	Buckley	destroyer escort	1,400	7 July 1943	decommissioned 1947, sold for scrap 1966
Foley	Royal Navy	Captain (GMT type)	frigate	1,140	8 September 1943	returned to USN 22 August 1945, sold for scrap June 1946
Folkestone	Royal Navy	Hastings	sloop	1,045	25 June 1930	sold for scrap 22 May 1947
Foreman	United States Navy	Buckley	destroyer escort	1,400	22 October 1943	decommissioned 1946, sold for scrap 1966
Formoe	United States Navy	John C. Butler	destroyer escort	1,350	5 October 1944	decommissioned 1957, to Portugal as Diogo-Cão 7 February 1957, scrapped 1970
Forster	United States Navy	Edsall	destroyer escort	1,250	25 January 1944	decommissioned 1946, commissioned into Coast Guard 1951, returned to Navy 1954, decommissioned again 1971, captured by North Vietnam and renamed Dai Ky 1975, remained in service in Vietnamese navy
Fort Erie	Royal Canadian Navy	River	frigate	1,445	27 October 1944	paid off 26 March 1965
Fowey	Royal Navy	Shoreham	sloop	1,105	11 September 1931	sold for commercial service 1946 and renamed Rowlock, scrapped 1950
Foss	United States Navy	Buckley	destroyer escort	1,400	23 July 1943	decommissioned 1957, sold for scrap 1965
Fowler	United States Navy	Buckley	destroyer escort	1,400	15 March 1944	decommissioned 1946, sold for scrap 1966
Frament	United States Navy	Buckley	destroyer escort	1,400	15 August 1943	decommissioned 1946, to Ecuador as power hulk 1961
Francis M. Robinson	United States Navy	Buckley	destroyer escort	1,400	15 January 1944	decommissioned 1960, sold for scrap 1973
Frederick C. Davis	United States Navy	Edsall	destroyer escort	1,200	14 July 1943	sunk 24 April 1945
French	United States Navy	John C. Butler	destroyer escort	1,350	9 October 1944	decommissioned 1946, sold for scrap 1973
Friso	Royal Netherlands Navy	Brinio	gunboat	530	12 July 1915	sunk 12 May 1940
Frome	Royal Navy; Free French Naval Forces	River	frigate	1,370	3 March 1944	to Free French 3 March 1944 as L'Escarmouche, paid off 1960
Frost	United States Navy	Edsall	destroyer escort	1,250	30 August 1943	decommissioned 1946, sold for scrap 1966
Frybarger	United States Navy	Buckley	destroyer escort	1,400	18 May 1944	decommissioned 1957, scrapped 1973
Fukae	Imperial Japanese Navy	Etorofu	kaibōkan	870	28 June 1943	to United Kingdom July 1947, scrapped
Gantner	United States Navy	Buckley	destroyer escort	1,400	29 July 1943	decommissioned 1949, to Republic of China as ROCS Wen Shan 22 February 1966, scrapped 1991
Gardiner	Royal Navy	Captain (GMT type)	frigate	1,140	28 September 1943	returned to USN 12 February 1946, sold for scrap June 1947
Garlies	Royal Navy	Captain (GMT type)	frigate	1,140	13 September 1943	returned to USN 20 August 1945, sold for scrap 18 July 1947
Garth	Royal Navy	Hunt (Type I)	escort destroyer	1,000	28 August 1940	scrapped 1958
Gendreau	United States Navy	Buckley	destroyer escort	1,400	17 March 1944	decommissioned 1948, sold for scrap 1973
Gentry	United States Navy	John C. Butler	destroyer escort	1,350	14 June 1944	decommissioned 1946, sold for scrap 1973
George	United States Navy	Buckley	destroyer escort	1,400	20 November 1943	decommissioned 1958, scrapped 1970
George A. Johnson	United States Navy	Rudderow	destroyer escort	1,450	15 April 1944	decommissioned 1957, scrapped 1966
George E. Davis	United States Navy	John C. Butler	destroyer escort	1,350	11 August 1944	decommissioned 1954, sold for scrap 1974
George W. Ingram	United States Navy	Buckley	destroyer escort	1,400	11 August 1943	decommissioned 1947, to Republic of China as ROCS Kang Shan 16 May 1967, scrapped 1978
Gillette	United States Navy	Buckley	destroyer escort	1,400	27 October 1943	decommissioned 1947, sold for scrap 1973
Gilligan	United States Navy	John C. Butler	destroyer escort	1,350	12 May 1944	decommissioned 1959, sold for scrap 1973
Gilmore	United States Navy	Evarts	destroyer escort	1,140	17 April 1943	decommissioned 1945, scrapped 1947
Glace Bay	Royal Canadian Navy	River	frigate	1,445	2 September 1944	paid off 17 November 1945
Glaisdale	Royal Navy	Hunt (Type III)	escort destroyer	1,050	12 June 1942	to Norway after war, scrapped 1961
Goathland	Royal Navy	Hunt (Type III)	escort destroyer	1,050	6 November 1942	constructive loss 24 July 1944, scrapped February 1946
Godavari	Royal Indian Navy	Black Swan	sloop	1,350	28 June 1943	to Pakistan as Sind 1948, sold for scrap 2 June 1959
Good Hope	South African Navy	Loch	frigate	1,435	9 November 1944	scuttled as artificial reef 12 December 1978
Goodall	Royal Navy	Captain (GMT type)	frigate	1,140	4 October 1943	sunk 29 April 1945
Goodson	Royal Navy	Captain (GMT type)	frigate	1,140	9 October 1943	damaged 26 June 1944, returned to USN 21 October 1944, sold 9 January 1947
Gore	Royal Navy	Captain (GMT type)	frigate	1,140	14 October 1943	returned to USN 2 May 1946, sold for scrap 10 June 1947
Gould	Royal Navy	Captain (GMT type)	frigate	1,140	18 September 1943	sunk 1 March 1944
Goss	United States Navy	John C. Butler	destroyer escort	1,350	26 August 1944	decommissioned 1958, sold for scrap 1972
Grady	United States Navy	John C. Butler	destroyer escort	1,350	11 September 1944	decommissioned 1957, sold for scrap 1969
Greenwood	United States Navy	Buckley	destroyer escort	1,400	25 September 1943	decommissioned and sold for scrap 1967
Greiner	United States Navy	Evarts	destroyer escort	1,140	18 August 1943	decommissioned 1945, scrapped 1946
Griswold	United States Navy	Evarts	destroyer escort	1,140	28 April 1943	decommissioned 1945, scrapped 1946
Grimsby	Royal Navy	Grimsby (Group 1)	sloop	990	17 May 1934	sunk 25 May 1941
Grindall	Royal Navy	Captain (GMT type)	frigate	1,140	23 September 1943	returned to USN 20 August 1945, sold for scrap May 1946
Grom	Soviet Navy	Uragan (Series II)	guard ship	450	22 July 1935	paid off 1959
Grou	Royal Canadian Navy	River	frigate	1,445	4 December 1943	paid off 25 December 1946
Grove	Royal Navy	Hunt (Type II)	escort destroyer	1,050	5 February 1942	sunk 12 June 1942
Groza	Soviet Navy	Uragan (Series I)	guard ship	450	22 July 1932	scrapped 1959
Gruno	Royal Netherlands Navy	Brinio	gunboat	533	15 July 1915	decommissioned January 1950
Gunason	United States Navy	Buckley	destroyer escort	1,400	1 February 1944	decommissioned 1948, sunk as target 1973
Haas	United States Navy	John C. Butler	destroyer escort	1,350	2 August 1944	decommissioned 1958, sold for scrap 1967
Habuto	Imperial Japanese Navy	Hiburi	kaibōkan	940	7 April 1945	decommissioned 23 October 1945, ceded to United Kingdom 16 July 1947, later scrapped
Hachijo	Imperial Japanese Navy	Shimushu	kaibōkan	870	31 March 1941	scrapped 30 April 1948
Hai Chao	Republic of China Navy		sloop	1,250		
Haines	United States Navy	Buckley	destroyer escort	1,400	27 December 1943	decommissioned 1946, scrapped 1961
Halloran	United States Navy	Evarts	destroyer escort	1,140	27 May 1944	decommissioned 1945, scrapped 1947
Hallowell	Royal Canadian Navy	River	frigate	1,445	8 August 1944	paid off 7 November 1945
Halsted	Royal Navy	Captain (TE type)	frigate	1,400	3 November 1943	constructive loss 11 June 1944, sold for scrap 28 March 1947
Hambledon	Royal Navy	Hunt (Type I)	escort destroyer	1,000	8 June 1940	paid off December 1945, scrapped 1957
Hammann	United States Navy	Edsall	destroyer escort	1,250	17 May 1943	decommissioned 1945, sold for scrap 1974
Hanna	United States Navy	John C. Butler	destroyer escort	1,350	27 January 1945	decommissioned 1959, sold for scrap 1973
Hargood	Royal Navy	Captain (TE type)	frigate	1,400	7 February 1944	returned to USN 23 February 1946, sold for scrap March 1947
Harmon	United States Navy	Buckley	destroyer escort	1,400	31 August 1943	decommissioned 1947, sold for scrap 1967
Harold C. Thomas	United States Navy	Evarts	destroyer escort	1,140	31 May 1943	decommissioned 1945, scrapped 1946
Hart	Royal Navy	Black Swan (Modified)	sloop	1,350	12 December 1943	to West Germany as Scheer 1958, sold for scrap 17 March 1971
Hartland	Royal Navy	Banff-class sloop	sloop	2,108	16 June 1928	Transferred to Royal Navy on 30 April 1941, sunk in 1942
Harveson	United States Navy	Edsall	destroyer escort	1,250	12 October 1943	decommissioned 1960, sunk as target 1967
Hastings	Royal Navy	Hastings	sloop	1,045	26 November 1930	scrapped 10 April 1946
Haverfield	United States Navy	Edsall	destroyer escort	1,250	29 November 1943	decommissioned 1969, sold for scrap 1971
Haydon	Royal Navy	Hunt (Type II)	escort destroyer	1,050	24 October 1942	paid off and scrapped 1958
Hayter	United States Navy	Buckley	destroyer escort	1,400	16 March 1944	to South Korea as ROKS Jon Nam 23 July 1967, scrapped 1986
Henry R. Kenyon	United States Navy	Buckley	destroyer escort	1,400	30 November 1943	decommissioned 1947, sold for scrap 1970
Herbert C. Jones	United States Navy	Edsall	destroyer escort	1,250	21 July 1943	decommissioned 1947, sold for scrap 1973
Heyliger	United States Navy	John C. Butler	destroyer escort	1,350	24 March 1945	decommissioned 1958, sunk as target 1969
Heythrop	Royal Navy	Hunt (Type II)	escort destroyer	1,050	21 June 1941	sunk 20 March 1942
Hiburi	Imperial Japanese Navy	Hiburi	kaibōkan	940	27 June 1944	sunk 22 August 1944
Hill	United States Navy	Edsall	destroyer escort	1,250	16 August 1943	decommissioned 1946, sold for scrap 1974
Hind	Royal Navy	Black Swan (Modified)	sloop	1,350	11 April 1944	scrapped 10 December 1958
Hindustan	Royal Indian Navy	Hastings	sloop	1,045	10 October 1930	to Pakistan 1948, renamed Karsaz
Hirado	Imperial Japanese Navy	Etorofu	kaibōkan	870	28 September 1943	sunk 12 September 1944
Hissem	United States Navy	Edsall	destroyer escort	1,250	13 January 1944	decommissioned 1970, sunk as target 1982
Hodges	United States Navy	Rudderow	destroyer escort	1,450	27 May 1944	decommissioned 1946, scrapped 1973
Holder	United States Navy	Edsall	destroyer escort	1,250	18 January 1944	Torpedoed by German aircraft northeast of Algiers on 11 April 1944. Struck from Navy List 23 September 1944. Stern used to repair Menges. Remainder of ship sold for scrap 1947
Holderness	Royal Navy	Hunt (Type I)	escort destroyer	1,000	10 August 1940	paid off 1956, scrapped 1956
Holmes	Royal Navy	Captain (TE type)	frigate	1,400	31 January 1944	returned to USN 3 December 1945, sold for scrap October 1947
Hollis	United States Navy	Buckley	destroyer escort	1,400	24 January 1944	decommissioned 1956, scrapped 1975
Holt	United States Navy	Rudderow	destroyer escort	1,450	9 June 1944	to South Korea as Chung Nam 1963, scrapped 1984
Holton	United States Navy	Buckley	destroyer escort	1,400	1 May 1944	decommissioned 1946, scrapped 1974
Hopping	United States Navy	Buckley	destroyer escort	1,400	21 May 1943	decommissioned 1947, sold for scrap 1966
Hoquiam	United States Navy; Soviet Navy	Tacoma	frigate	1,430	8 May 1944	to Soviet Union as EK-13 16 August 1945, returned to United States 1949, to South Korea as Nae Tong 1951, scrapped 1973
Hoste	Royal Navy	Captain (GMT type)	frigate	1,140	3 December 1943	returned to USN 22 August 1945, sold for scrap May 1946
Hotham	Royal Navy	Captain (TE type)	frigate	1,400	8 February 1944	returned to USN 13 March 1956, sold for scrap 1 November 1956
Hova	Free French Naval Forces	Cannon	destroyer escort	1,240	18 March 1944	Decommissioned May 1964
Howard D. Crow	United States Navy	Edsall	destroyer escort	1,250	27 September 1943	decommissioned 1968, sold for scrap 1970
Howard F. Clark	United States Navy	John C. Butler	destroyer escort	1,350	25 May 1944	decommissioned 1946, sold for scrap 1973
Hubbard	United States Navy	Buckley	destroyer escort	1,400	6 March 1944	decommissioned 1946, sold for scrap 1966
Humaitá	Paraguayan Navy	Humaitá	gunboat	856	May 1931	preserved as museum ship 1992
Hursley	Royal Navy; Royal Hellenic Navy	Hunt (Type II)	escort destroyer	1,050	2 April 1942	to Greece 2 November 1943 as Kriti, scrapped April 1960
Hurst	United States Navy	Edsall	destroyer escort	1,250	30 August 1943	decommissioned 1946, transferred to Mexico as comodoro Manual Azueta 1973
Hurworth	Royal Navy	Hunt (Type II)	escort destroyer	1,050	5 October 1941	sunk 22 October 1943
Huse	United States Navy	Edsall	destroyer escort	1,250	30 June 1965	decommissioned 1965, sold for scrap 1974
Ibis	Royal Navy	Black Swan	sloop	1,250	30 August 1941	sunk 10 November 1942
Iki	Imperial Japanese Navy	Etorofu	kaibōkan	870	31 May 1943	sunk 24 May 1944
Ikuna	Imperial Japanese Navy	Hiburi	kaibōkan	940	15 October 1944	decommissioned 30 November 1945, to Japan Maritime Safety Agency as Ojika 1 January 1949, decommissioned 25 May 1963
Inch	United States Navy	Edsall	destroyer escort	1,250	8 September 1943	decommissioned 1946, sold for scrap 1974
Inch Arran	Royal Canadian Navy	River	frigate	1,445	18 November 1944	paid off 23 June 1965
Indus	Royal Indian Navy	Grimsby	sloop	1,210	15 March 1935	sunk 6 April 1942
Ingham	United States Coast Guard	Treasury	cutter	2,216	12 September 1936	decommissioned 1988, preserved as museum ship
Inglis	Royal Navy	Captain (GMT type)	frigate	1,140	12 January 1944	returned to USN 20 March 1946, sold for scrap September 1947
Inman	Royal Navy	Captain (GMT type)	frigate	1,140	13 January 1944	returned to USN 1 March 1946, sold for scrap November 1946
Insidioso	Regia Marina; Kriegsmarine	Indomito	destroyer escort	741	1914	scuttled 10 September 1943, raised by Germany and later commissioned as Wildfang 8 November 1943, sunk 5 November 1944
Ira Jeffery	United States Navy	Buckley	destroyer escort	1,400	15 August 1943	decommissioned 1946, sunk as target 1962
Isabel	United States Navy		patrol yacht	710	28 December 1917	scrapped 25 March 1946
Ishigaki	Imperial Japanese Navy	Shimushu	kaibōkan	870	15 February 1941	sunk 31 May 1944
J. Douglas Blackwood	United States Navy	Buckley	destroyer escort	1,400	15 December 1943	decommissioned and sunk as target 1970
J. R. Y. Blakely	United States Navy	Edsall	destroyer escort	1,250	16 August 1943	decommissioned 1946, sold for scrap 1973
J. Richard Ward	United States Navy	Edsall	destroyer escort	1,250	5 July 1943	decommissioned 1946, sold for scrap 1972
Jaccard	United States Navy	John C. Butler	destroyer escort	1,350	26 July 1944	decommissioned 1946, sunk as target 1968
Jack Miller	United States Navy	John C. Butler	destroyer escort	1,350	13 April 1944	decommissioned 1946, sold for scrap 1969
Jack W. Wilke	United States Navy	Buckley	destroyer escort	1,400	7 March 1944	decommissioned 1960, scrapped 1974
Jacob Jones	United States Navy	Edsall	destroyer escort	1,250	29 April 1943	decommissioned 1946, sold for scrap 1973
James E. Craig	United States Navy	Buckley	destroyer escort	1,400	1 November 1943	decommissioned 1946, sunk as target 1969
Janssen	United States Navy	Edsall	destroyer escort	1,250	18 December 1943	decommissioned 1946, sold for scrap 1973
Jenks	United States Navy	Buckley	destroyer escort	1,400	19 January 1944	decommissioned 1946, sold for scrap 1968
Jesse Rutherford	United States Navy	John C. Butler	destroyer escort	1,350	31 May 1944	decommissioned 1946, sunk as target 1968
Jobb	United States Navy	Rudderow	destroyer escort	1,450	4 July 1944	decommissioned 1946, sold for scrap 1970
Johan Maurits van Nassau	Royal Netherlands Navy		gunboat	1,795	5 April 1933	sunk 14 May 1940
John C. Butler	United States Navy	John C. Butler	destroyer escort	1,350	31 March 1944	decommissioned 1957, sunk as target 1971
John J. Powers	United States Navy	Evarts	destroyer escort	1,140	29 February 1944	decommissioned 1945, scrapped 1946
John L. Williamson	United States Navy	John C. Butler	destroyer escort	1,350	31 October 1944	decommissioned 1946, sold for scrap 1973
John M. Bermingham	United States Navy	Evarts	destroyer escort	1,140	4 April 1944	decommissioned 1945, scrapped 1946
Johnnie Hutchins	United States Navy	John C. Butler	destroyer escort	1,350	28 August 1944	decommissioned 1958, sold for scrap 1974
Joliette	Royal Canadian Navy	River	frigate	1,445	14 June 1944	paid off 19 November 1945
Jonquiere	Royal Canadian Navy	River	frigate	1,445	10 May 1944	paid off 23 September 1966
Jordan	United States Navy	Buckley	destroyer escort	1,400	17 December 1943	decommissioned 1945, sold for scrap 1947
Joseph E. Campbell	United States Navy	Buckley	destroyer escort	1,400	23 September 1943	to Chile as Riquelme 1966, hulked and used as spare parts
Joseph E. Connolly	United States Navy	John C. Butler	destroyer escort	1,350	28 February 1945	decommissioned 1946, sunk as target 1972
Joyce	United States Navy	Edsall	destroyer escort	1,250	30 September 1943	decommissioned 1960, sold for scrap 1973
Jumna	Royal Indian Navy	Black Swan	sloop	1,250	13 May 1941	renamed INS Jamuna 1968, paid off late 1980 and broken up
K1	Kriegsmarine	K	sloop	1,200	2 October 1941	sunk 5 May 1945
K2	Kriegsmarine	K	sloop	1,200	14 November 1942	heavily damaged 9 October 1944, sold for scrap October 1947
K3	Kriegsmarine	K	sloop	1,200	2 February 1942	returned to Netherlands as HNLMS Van Speijk 18 July 1946, sold for scrap 29 August 1960
Kanaris	Royal Hellenic Navy	Hunt (Type III)	escort destroyer	1,050	10 August 1942	paid off 1959, scrapped 1960
Kanju	Imperial Japanese Navy	Etorofu	kaibōkan	870	30 October 1943	scuttled 15 August 1945
Kasado	Imperial Japanese Navy	Etorofu	kaibōkan	870	27 February 1944	scrapped 1948
Keats	Royal Navy	Captain (GMT type)	frigate	1,140	19 October 1943	returned to USN 27 February 1946, sold for scrap 19 November 1946
Keith	United States Navy	Edsall	destroyer escort	1,250	19 July 1943	decommissioned 1946, sold for scrap 1973
Kempthorne	Royal Navy	Captain (GMT type)	frigate	1,140	23 October 1943	returned to USN 20 August 1945, sold for scrap May 1946
Kendall C. Campbell	United States Navy	John C. Butler	destroyer escort	1,350	31 July 1944	decommissioned 1946, sold for scrap 1973
Kenneth M. Willett	United States Navy	John C. Butler	destroyer escort	1,350	19 July 1944	decommissioned 1959, sunk as target 1974
Kephart	United States Navy	Buckley	destroyer escort	1,400	7 January 1944	to South Korea as ROKS Gyeongbuk 16 May 1967, stricken 1985
Key	United States Navy	John C. Butler	destroyer escort	1,350	5 June 1944	decommissioned 1946, sold for scrap 1972
Kingsmill	Royal Navy	Captain (GMT type)	frigate	1,140	23 October 1943	returned to USN 22 August 1945, sold for scrap 17 February 1947
Kirkland Lake	Royal Canadian Navy	River	frigate	1,445	21 August 1944	paid off 14 December 1945
Kirkpatrick	United States Navy	Edsall	destroyer escort	1,250	23 October 1943	decommissioned 1960, sold for scrap 1975
Kistna	Royal Indian Navy	Black Swan (Modified)	sloop	1,350	26 August 1943	renamed INS Krishna 1968, paid off late 1981 and scrapped
Kite	Royal Navy	Black Swan (Modified)	sloop	1,350	1 March 1943	sunk 21 August 1944
Koiner	United States Navy	Edsall	destroyer escort	1,250	27 December 1943	decommissioned 1968, sold for scrap 1969
Kokanee	Royal Canadian Navy	River	frigate	1,445	6 June 1944	paid off 21 December 1945
Krakowiak	Polish Navy	Hunt (Type II)	escort destroyer	1,050	28 May 1941	returned to RN September 1946, scrapped March 1959.
Kretchmer	United States Navy	Edsall	destroyer escort	1,250	27 December 1943	decommissioned 1973, sold for scrap 1974
Kujawiak	Polish Navy	Hunt (Type II)	escort destroyer	1,050	17 June 1941	sunk 16 June 1942
Kume	Imperial Japanese Navy	Hiburi	kaibōkan	940	25 September 1944	sunk 28 January 1945
Kunashiri	Imperial Japanese Navy	Shimushu	kaibōkan	870	3 October 1940	ran aground and abandoned 4 June 1946
Kurahashi	Imperial Japanese Navy	Mikura	kaibōkan	940	19 February 1944	ceded to United Kingdom 1947, scrapped 1948
Kusagaki	Imperial Japanese Navy	Mikura	kaibōkan	940	1 July 1944	sunk 14 April 1945
La Combattante	Free French Naval Forces	Hunt (Type III)	escort destroyer	1,050	30 December 1942	sunk 23 February 1945
La Grandière	French Navy; Free French Naval Forces	Bougainville	aviso	1,938	20 June 1940	scrapped 23 November 1959
La Hulloise	Royal Canadian Navy	River	frigate	1,445	6 December 1945	paid off 16 July 1965
La Prade	United States Navy	John C. Butler	destroyer escort	1,350	20 April 1944	decommissioned 1946, sold for scrap 1973
Labuan	Royal Navy	Colony	frigate	1,264	5 February 1944	18 May 1948; scrapped 1957
Lake	United States Navy	Evarts	destroyer escort	1,140	5 February 1944	decommissioned 1945, scrapped 1946
Lamerton	Royal Navy	Hunt (Type II)	escort destroyer	1,000	16 August 1941	scrapped 1975
Lanark	Royal Canadian Navy	River	frigate	1,445	6 July 1944	paid off 19 March 1965
Laning	United States Navy	Buckley	destroyer escort	1,400	1 August 1943	decommissioned 1957, sold for scrap 1975
Lansing	United States Navy	Edsall	destroyer escort	1,250	10 November 1943	decommissioned 1965, sold for scrap 1974
Lapwing	Royal Navy	Black Swan (Modified)	sloop	1,350	21 March 1944	sunk 20 March 1945
Lark	Royal Navy	Black Swan (Modified)	sloop	1,350	10 April 1944	torpedoed 17 February 1945, to Soviet as Neptun June 1945, scrapped 1956
Lasalle	Royal Canadian Navy	River	frigate	1,445	29 June 1944	paid off 17 December 1945
Lauderdale	Royal Navy	Hunt (Type II)	escort destroyer	1,050	August 1942	to Greece as Aigaion 1946, scrapped 1960
Lauzon	Royal Canadian Navy	River	frigate	1,445	30 August 1944	paid off 24 May 1963
Lawford	Royal Navy	Captain (GMT type)	frigate	1,140	3 November 1943	sunk 8 June 1944
Lawrence	Royal Indian Navy		sloop	1,245	27 December 1919	Scrapped 1947
Lawrence C. Taylor	United States Navy	John C. Butler	destroyer escort	1,350	13 May 1944	decommissioned 1946, sold for scrap 1973
Ledbury	Royal Navy	Hunt (Type II)	escort destroyer	1,050	11 February 1942	scrapped April 1958
Lee Fox	United States Navy	Buckley	destroyer escort	1,400	30 August 1943	decommissioned 1946, sold for scrap 1966
LeHardy	United States Navy	Evarts	destroyer escort	1,140	15 May 1943	decommissioned 1945, scrapped 1946
Leith	Royal Navy	Grimsby (Group 1)	sloop	990	12 July 1934	sold to civilian 25 November 1946, scrapped 1955
Leland E. Thomas	United States Navy	John C. Butler	destroyer escort	1,350	19 June 1944	decommissioned 1946, sold for scrap 1973
Leopold	United States Navy	Edsall	destroyer escort	1,250	18 October 1943	Sunk by German U-255 south of Iceland on 10 March 1944
LeRay Wilson	United States Navy	John C. Butler	destroyer escort	1,350	10 May 1944	decommissioned 1959, sold for scrap 1973
Leslie L.B. Knox	United States Navy	Rudderow	destroyer escort	1,450	22 March 1944	decommissioned 1946, sold for scrap 1973
Levis	Royal Canadian Navy	River	frigate	1,445	21 July 1944	paid off 21 February 1946
Lewis	United States Navy	John C. Butler	destroyer escort	1,350	5 September 1944	decommissioned 1960, sunk as target 1966
Liddesdale	Royal Navy	Hunt (Type II)	escort destroyer	1,000	28 February 1941	scrapped 1948
Liddle	United States Navy	Buckley	destroyer escort	1,400	6 December 1943	decommissioned and sold for scrap 1967
Limbourne	Royal Navy	Hunt (Type III)	escort destroyer	1,050	24 October 1942	sunk 22 October 1943
Lloyd	United States Navy	Buckley	destroyer escort	1,400	11 February 1944	decommissioned 1958, sold for scrap 1968
Lloyd E. Acree	United States Navy	John C. Butler	destroyer escort	1,350	1 August 1944	decommissioned 1946, sold for scrap 1973
Loch Achanalt	Royal Canadian Navy	Loch	frigate	1,435	31 July 1944	to New Zealand as Pukaki March 1948, scrapped October 1965
Loch Achray	Royal Navy	Loch	frigate	1,435	1 February 1945	to New Zealand as Kaniere 1948, scrapped 1966
Loch Alvie	Royal Canadian Navy	Loch	frigate	1,435	10 August 1944	transferred to the Royal Navy in 1945, scrapped in 1965
Loch Arkaig	Royal Navy	Loch	frigate	1,435	1 November 1945	paid off 1952, scrapped 28 January 1960
Loch Craggie	Royal Navy	Loch	frigate	1,435	23 October 1944	sold for scrap 8 July 1963
Loch Dunvegan	Royal Navy	Loch	frigate	1,435	25 June 1944	sold for scrap 24 August 1960
Loch Eck	Royal Navy	Loch	frigate	1,435	7 November 1944	to New Zealand as Hawea 1948, sold for scrap September 1965
Loch Fada	Royal Navy	Loch	frigate	1,435	10 April 1944	paid off 11 October 1967, scrapped 28 May 1970
Loch Fyne	Royal Navy	Loch	frigate	1,435	9 November 1944	paid off 6 May 1963, scrapped 1970
Loch Glendhu	Royal Navy	Loch	frigate	1,435	23 February 1945	scrapped November 1957
Loch Gorm	Royal Navy	Loch	frigate	1,435	18 December 1944	sold for commercial service September 1961, renamed Orion
Loch Insh	Royal Navy	Loch	frigate	1,435	20 October 1944	scrapped in 1977
Loch Katrine	Royal Navy	Loch	frigate	1,435	29 December 1944	to New Zealand as Rotoiti 1948, sold for scrap 18 January 1967
Loch Killin	Royal Navy	Loch	frigate	1,435	12 April 1944	scrapped 24 August 1960
Loch Killisport	Royal Navy	Loch	frigate	1,435	9 July 1945	paid off 4 August 1965, scrapped 18 March 1970
Loch Lomond	Royal Navy	Loch	frigate	1,435	16 November 1944	sold for scrapped 1968
Loch More	Royal Navy	Loch	frigate	1,435	24 February 1945	scrapped August 1963
Loch Morlich	Royal Canadian Navy	Loch	frigate	1,435	17 July 1944	to New Zealand as Tutira April 1949, scrapped 1966
Loch Quoich	Royal Navy	Loch	frigate	1,435	11 January 1945	scrapped November 1957
Loch Ruthven	Royal Navy	Loch	frigate	1,435	6 October 1944	scrapped 1966
Loch Scavaig	Royal Navy	Loch	frigate	1,435	22 December 1944	scrapped September 1959
Loch Shin	Royal Navy	Loch	frigate	1,435	10 October 1944	to New Zealand as Taupo 13 September 1948, sold for scrap 15 December 1961
Loch Tarbert	Royal Navy	Loch	frigate	1,435	22 February 1945	scrapped September 1959
Loch Torridon	Royal Navy	Loch	frigate	1,435	19 October 1945	scrapped August 1965
Loch Tralaig	Royal Navy	Loch	frigate	1,435	4 July 1945	scrapped August 1963
Loch Veyatie	Royal Navy	Loch	frigate	1,435	13 July 1946	scrapped August 1965
Locotenent Lepri Remus	Royal Romanian Navy	Friponne	gunboat	344	1918	sunk 11 January 1941
Locotenent-Comandor Stihi Eugen	Royal Romanian Navy	Friponne	gunboat	344	1918	to Soviet Union as Akhtuba September 1944, returned to Romania October 1945, served as survey vessel until 2002
Loeser	United States Navy	Buckley	destroyer escort	1,400	10 October 1943	decommissioned 1968, sunk as target 1969
Londonderry	Royal Navy	Grimsby (Group 1)	sloop	990	20 September 1935	scrapped 1948
Longueuil	Royal Canadian Navy	River	frigate	1,445	18 May 1944	paid off 31 December 1946
Lough	United States Navy	Rudderow	destroyer escort	1,450	2 May 1944	decommissioned 1946, sold for scrap 1970
Lovelace	United States Navy	Buckley	destroyer escort	1,400	7 November 1943	decommissioned 1946, sunk as target 1968
Lovering	United States Navy	Evarts	destroyer escort	1,140	17 September 1943	decommissioned 1945, scrapped 1946
Lowe	United States Navy	Edsall	destroyer escort	1,250	22 November 1943	decommissioned 1968, sold for scrap 1969
Lowestoft	Royal Navy	Grimsby (Group 1)	sloop	990	22 November 1934	sold to civilian 1946, scrapped 1955
Loy	United States Navy	Buckley	destroyer escort	1,400	12 September 1943	decommissioned 1947, sold for scrap 1966
Lyman	United States Navy	Evarts	destroyer escort	1,140	19 February 1944	decommissioned 1945, scrapped 1946
Mack	United States Navy	John C. Butler	destroyer escort	1,350	16 August 1944	decommissioned 1946, sold for scrap 1973
Maeklong	Royal Thai Navy	Maeklong	sloop	1,400	10 June 1937	preserved as museum ship 1996
Magog	Royal Canadian Navy	River	frigate	1,445	7 May 1944	paid off 20 December 1944
Magpie	Royal Navy	Black Swan (Modified)	sloop	1,350	30 August 1943	scrapped 12 July 1959
Major	United States Navy	Buckley	destroyer escort	1,400	12 February 1944	decommissioned 1948, scrapped 1973
Maloy	United States Navy	Buckley	destroyer escort	1,400	13 December 1943	decommissioned 1965, scrapped 1966
Manju	Imperial Japanese Navy	Etorofu	kaibōkan	870	30 November 1943	scrapped 1946
Manlove	United States Navy	Evarts	destroyer escort	1,140	8 November 1943	decommissioned 1945, scrapped 1948
Manning	United States Navy	Buckley	destroyer escort	1,400	1 October 1943	decommissioned 1947, sold for scrap 1969
Marchand	United States Navy	Edsall	destroyer escort	1,250	8 September 1943	decommissioned 1947, sold for scrap 1974
Marocain	United States Navy; Free French Naval Forces	Cannon	destroyer escort	1,240	29 February 1944	to Free French 29 February 1944, decommissioned May 1964
Marsh	United States Navy	Buckley	destroyer escort	1,400	12 January 1944	decommissioned 1962, scrapped 1974
Martin	United States Navy	Evarts	destroyer escort	1,140	4 September 1943	decommissioned 1945, scrapped 1946
Martin H. Ray	United States Navy	Edsall	destroyer escort	1,250	28 February 1944	decommissioned 1946, sold for scrap 1967
Mason	United States Navy	Evarts	destroyer escort	1,140	20 March 1944	decommissioned 1945, scrapped 1947
Matane	Royal Canadian Navy	River	frigate	1,445	22 October 1943	paid off 11 February 1946
Matsuwa	Imperial Japanese Navy	Etorofu	kaibōkan	870	23 March 1943	sunk 22 August 1944
Maurice J. Manuel	United States Navy	John C. Butler	destroyer escort	1,350	30 June 1944	decommissioned 1957, sunk as target 1966
McCoy Reynolds	United States Navy	John C. Butler	destroyer escort	1,350	2 May 1944	decommissioned 1957, to Portugal as Corte Real December 1968, scrapped 1970
McGinty	United States Navy	John C. Butler	destroyer escort	1,350	25 September 1944	decommissioned 1968, sold for scrap 1969
McNulty	United States Navy	Rudderow	destroyer escort	1,450	31 March 1944	decommissioned 1946, sunk as target 1972
Melbreak	Royal Navy	Hunt (Type III)	escort destroyer	1,050	10 October 1942	paid off and scrapped 1956
Melvin R. Nawman	United States Navy	John C. Butler	destroyer escort	1,350	16 May 1944	decommissioned 1960, sold for scrap 1973
Mendip	Royal Navy	Hunt (Type I)	escort destroyer	1,000	12 October 1940	paid off 20 May 1946, scrapped 1972
Mendota	United States Coast Guard	Owasco	cutter	2,010	2 June 1945	decommissioned 1973, scrapped 1974
Menges	United States Navy	Edsall	destroyer escort	1,250	26 October 1943	decommissioned 1947, sold for scrap 1972
Meon	Royal Navy; Royal Canadian Navy	River	frigate	1,445	31 December 1943	to Canada 7 February 1944, paid off 23 April 1945
Mermaid	Royal Navy	Black Swan (Modified)	sloop	1,350	12 May 1944	to West Germany as Scharnhorst 5 May 1950, scrapped April 1990
Merrill	United States Navy	Edsall	destroyer escort	1,250	27 November 1943	decommissioned 1946, sold for scrap 1974
Metel	Soviet Navy	Uragan (Series I)	guard ship	450	18 November 1934	converted to training ship 1945
Metivier	United States Navy	Rudderow	destroyer escort	1,450	7 April 1944	decommissioned 1946, sold as scrap 1968
Meynell	Royal Navy	Hunt (Type I)	escort destroyer	1,050	10 December 1940	scrapped 1978
Miaoulis	Royal Hellenic Navy	Hunt (Type III)	escort destroyer	1,050	25 November 1942	paid off 1959, scrapped 1960
Middleton	Royal Navy	Hunt (Type II)	escort destroyer	1,050	10 January 1943	scrapped February 1958
Milford	Royal Navy	Shoreham	sloop	1,105	22 December 1932	scrapped 22 July 1949
Mills	United States Navy	Edsall	destroyer escort	1,250	30 August 1943	decommissioned 1970, sold for scrap 1975
Mitchell	United States Navy	Evarts	destroyer escort	1,140	17 November 1943	decommissioned 1945, scrapped 1946
Mikura	Imperial Japanese Navy	Mikura	kaibōkan	940	31 October 1943	sunk 28 March 1945
Miyake	Imperial Japanese Navy	Mikura	kaibōkan	940	30 November 1943	scrapped 2 July 1948
Modeste	Royal Navy	Black Swan (Modified)	sloop	1,350	3 September 1945	scrapped 11 March 1961
Mokuto	Imperial Japanese Navy	Hiburi	kaibōkan	940	19 February 1945	sunk 4 April 1945
Molniya	Soviet Navy	Uragan (Series III)	guard ship	450	20 September 1936	paid off 1959
Monnow	Royal Navy; Royal Canadian Navy	River	frigate	1,445	11 May 1944	to Canada 3 August 1944, paid off 11 June 1945
Montreal	Royal Canadian Navy	River	frigate	1,445	12 November 1943	paid off 15 October 1945
Montserrat	Royal Navy	Colony	frigate	1,264	31 August 1944	Returned to USN 11 June 1946
Moore	United States Navy	Edsall	destroyer escort	1,250	1 July 1943	decommissioned 1947, sunk as target 1975
Moresby	Royal Australian Navy	24	sloop	1,320	25 May 1918	sold for scrap 3 February 1947
Mosley	United States Navy	Edsall	destroyer escort	1,250	30 October 1943	decommissioned 1946, sold for scrap 1973
Moyola	Royal Navy; Free French Naval Forces	River	frigate	1,370	15 October 1944	to France as Tonkinois 15 October 1944, Decommissioned 1961
Mutsure	Imperial Japanese Navy	Etorofu	kaibōkan	870	31 July 1943	sunk 2 September 1943
Naifeh	United States Navy	John C. Butler	destroyer escort	1,350	4 July 1944	decommissioned 1960, sunk as target 1966
Narbada	Royal Indian Navy	Black Swan	sloop	1,250	29 April 1943	to Pakistan as Jhelum 1948, sold for scrap 15 July 1959
Narborough	Royal Navy	Captain (TE type)	frigate	1,400	21 January 1944	returned to USN 4 February 1946, sold for scrap 14 December 1946
Natal	South African Navy	Loch	frigate	1,435	1 March 1945	sunk as target 19 September 1972
Nene	Royal Navy; Royal Canadian Navy	River	frigate	1,445	8 April 1943	to Canada 4 June 1944, paid off 11 June 1945
Nereide	Royal Navy	Black Swan (Modified)	sloop	1,350	6 May 1946	scrapped 18 May 1958
Neuendorf	United States Navy	Buckley	destroyer escort	1,400	18 October 1943	decommissioned 1946, sunk as target 1967
Neunzer	United States Navy	Edsall	destroyer escort	1,250	27 September 1943	decommissioned 1947, sold for scrap 1973
New Glasgow	Royal Canadian Navy	River	frigate	1,445	22 December 1943	paid off 30 January 1967
New Waterford	Royal Canadian Navy	River	frigate	1,445	21 January 1944	paid off 2 December 1966
Newell	United States Navy	Edsall	destroyer escort	1,250	30 October 1943	decommissioned 1968, sold for scrap 1971
Newman	United States Navy	Buckley	destroyer escort	1,400	26 November 1943	decommissioned 1946, sold for scrap 1966
Nōmi	Imperial Japanese Navy	Mikura	kaibōkan	940	28 February 1944	sunk 14 April 1945
Nyasaland	Royal Navy	Colony	frigate	1,264	31 July 1944	Returned to USN 15 April 1946
O'Flaherty	United States Navy	John C. Butler	destroyer escort	1,350	8 April 1944	decommissioned 1947, sold for scrap 1973
O'Reilly	United States Navy	Edsall	destroyer escort	1,250	28 December 1943	decommissioned 1946, sold for scrap 1972
O'Toole	United States Navy	Evarts	destroyer escort	1,140	22 January 1944	decommissioned 1945, scrapped 1946
Oakley	Royal Navy	Hunt (Type II)	escort destroyer	1,050	7 May 1942	to West Germany as Gneisenau 11 November 1957, scrapped 18 January 1977
Oberrender	United States Navy	John C. Butler	destroyer escort	1,350	11 May 1944	decommissioned 1945, sunk as target 1945
Oki	Imperial Japanese Navy	Etorofu	kaibōkan	870	28 March 1943	to Republic of China as Gu An August 1947, captured by Communist China and renamed Chang Bai 1949, scrapped 1982
Oliver Mitchell	United States Navy	John C. Butler	destroyer escort	1,350	14 June 1944	decommissioned 1946, sold for scrap 1973
Opossum	Royal Navy	Black Swan (Modified)	sloop	1,350	16 June 1945	scrapped 26 April 1960
Orkney	Royal Canadian Navy	River	frigate	1,445	18 April 1944	paid off 22 January 1946
Osberg	United States Navy	John C. Butler	destroyer escort	1,350	10 December 1945	decommissioned 1958, sold for scrap 1974
Osmus	United States Navy	Buckley	destroyer escort	1,400	23 February 1944	decommissioned 1947, scrapped 1973
Otter	United States Navy	Buckley	destroyer escort	1,400	21 February 1944	decommissioned 1947, sunk as target 1970
Otterstetter	United States Navy	Edsall	destroyer escort	1,250	6 August 1943	decommissioned 1960, sold for scrap 1976
Ōtsu	Imperial Japanese Navy	Hiburi	kaibōkan	940		launched 10 May 1945, 95% completed by the end of the war, scrapped 25 March 1948
Outremont	Royal Canadian Navy	River	frigate	1,445	27 November 1943	paid off 7 June 1965
Owasco	United States Coast Guard	Owasco	cutter	2,010	18 May 1945	decommissioned 1973, scrapped 1974
Papua	Royal Navy	Colony	frigate	1,264	25 July 1944	Returned to USN 13 May 1946; sold to Egypt and sank in Gulf of Suez 1953
Paraguay	Paraguayan Navy	Humaitá	gunboat	856	May 1931	still in service
Parle	United States Navy	Rudderow	destroyer escort	1,450	29 July 1944	decommissioned 1970, sunk as target 1970
Parramatta	Royal Australian Navy	Grimsby	sloop	1,060	8 April 1940	sunk 27 November 1941
Pasco	United States Navy; Soviet Navy	Tacoma	frigate	1,430	15 April 1944	to Soviet Union as EK-12 16 August 1945, returned to United States 1949, to Japan as Kashi 1953, to South Korea for parts and converted to floating pier 1969
Pathan	Royal Indian Navy	P	sloop	623	5 August 1921	sunk 23 June 1940.
Paul G. Baker	United States Navy	Buckley	destroyer escort	1,400	25 May 1944	decommissioned 1947, sold for scrap 1970
Peacock	Royal Navy	Black Swan (Modified)	sloop	1,350	10 May 1944	scrapped 7 May 1958
Peiffer	United States Navy	Rudderow	destroyer escort	1,450	15 June 1944	decommissioned 1946, sunk as target 1967
Pelican	Royal Navy	Egret	sloop	1,200	2 March 1939	scrapped 1958
Penetang	Royal Canadian Navy	River	frigate	1,445	19 October 1944	paid off 2 September 1955
Penylan	Royal Navy	Hunt (Type III)	escort destroyer	1,050	25 August 1942	sunk 3 December 1942
Penzance	Royal Navy	Hastings	sloop	1,045	15 January 1931	sunk 24 August 1940
Perim	Royal Navy	Colony	frigate	1,264	16 March 1944	Returned to USN 22 May 1946
Peterson	United States Navy	Edsall	destroyer escort	1,250	29 September 1943	decommissioned 19465, sold for scrap 1974
Pettit	United States Navy	Edsall	destroyer escort	1,250	23 September 1943	decommissioned 1946, sold for scrap 1974
Pheasant	Royal Navy	Black Swan (Modified)	sloop	1,350	12 May 1943	scrapped January 1963
Pillsbury	United States Navy	Edsall	destroyer escort	1,250	7 June 1943	decommissioned 1960, sold for scrap 1966
Pindos	Royal Hellenic Navy	Hunt (Type III)	escort destroyer	1,050	27 June 1942	paid off 1959, scrapped 1960
Pitcairn	Royal Navy	Colony	frigate	1,264	7 July 1944	Returned to USN 11 June 1946
Poole	United States Navy	Edsall	destroyer escort	1,250	29 September 1943	decommissioned 1947, sold for scrap 1974
Pope	United States Navy	Edsall	destroyer escort	1,250	25 June 1943	decommissioned 1946, sold for scrap 1973
Port Colborne	Royal Canadian Navy	River	frigate	1,445	15 November 1943	paid off 7 November 1945
Poundmaker	Royal Canadian Navy	River	frigate	1,445	17 September 1944	paid off 25 November 1945
Pontchartrain	United States Coast Guard	Owasco	cutter	2,010	28 July 1945	decommissioned 1973, scrapped 1974
Pratt	United States Navy	John C. Butler	destroyer escort	1,350	18 September 1944	decommissioned 1946, sold for scrap 1973
Presley	United States Navy	John C. Butler	destroyer escort	1,350	7 November 1944	decommissioned 1946, sold for scrap 1970
Prestonian	Royal Canadian Navy	River	frigate	1,445	13 September 1944	paid off 24 April 1956
Price	United States Navy	Edsall	destroyer escort	1,250	12 January 1944	decommissioned 1960, sold for scrap 1975
Pride	United States Navy	Edsall	destroyer escort	1,250	13 November 1943	decommissioned 1946, sold for scrap 1974
Prince Rupert	Royal Canadian Navy	River	frigate	1,445	30 August 1943	paid off 15 January 1946
Puckeridge	Royal Navy	Hunt (Type II)	escort destroyer	1,000	30 July 1941	sunk 6 September 1943 by U-617
Purga	Soviet Navy	Uragan (Series III)	guard ship	450	4 September 1936	sunk 1 September 1942, later raised
Pytchley	Royal Navy	Hunt (Type I)	escort destroyer	1,050	23 October 1940	paid off 1946, scrapped 1956
Quantock	Royal Navy	Hunt (Type I)	escort destroyer	1,050	6 February 1941	scrapped 1978
Quorn	Royal Navy	Hunt (Type I)	escort destroyer	1,050	21 September 1940	sunk 3 August 1944
Raby	United States Navy	Buckley	destroyer escort	1,400	7 December 1943	decommissioned 1953, scrapped 1969
Rall	United States Navy	Evarts	destroyer escort	1,140	8 April 1944	decommissioned 1945, scrapped 1947
Ramsden	United States Navy	Edsall	destroyer escort	1,250	19 October 1943	decommissioned 1960, sunk as target 1974
Raymond	United States Navy	John C. Butler	destroyer escort	1,350	15 April 1944	decommissioned 1958, sunk as target 1974
Redmill	Royal Navy	Captain (TE type)	frigate	1,400	30 November 1943	constructive loss 27 April 1945, sold for scrap 1947
Redpole	Royal Navy	Black Swan (Modified)	sloop	1,350	24 June 1943	scrapped 20 November 1960
Reeves	United States Navy	Buckley	destroyer escort	1,400	9 May 1943	decommissioned 1946, to Ecuador 1960
Renard	Royal Canadian Navy		patrol yacht	399	4 September 1917	paid off 1 August 1944, derelict 1955
Reuben James	United States Navy	Buckley	destroyer escort	1,400	1 April 1943	decommissioned 1947, sunk as a target 1971
Reynolds	United States Navy	Evarts	destroyer escort	1,140	1 November 1943	decommissioned 1945, scrapped 1947
Rhodes	United States Navy	Edsall	destroyer escort	1,250	25 October 1943	decommissioned 1963, sold for scrap 1975
Ribble	Royal Navy; Royal Canadian Navy	River	frigate	1,445	24 July 1944	to Canada 24 July 1944, paid off 11 June 1945
Rich	United States Navy	Buckley	destroyer escort	1,400	1 October 1943	sunk 8 June 1944
Richard M. Rowell	United States Navy	John C. Butler	destroyer escort	1,350	9 March 1944	decommissioned 1946, sold for scrap 1969
Richard S. Bull	United States Navy	John C. Butler	destroyer escort	1,350	26 February 1944	decommissioned 1946, sunk as target 1969
Richard W. Suesens	United States Navy	John C. Butler	destroyer escort	1,350	26 April 1944	decommissioned 1947, sold for scrap 1973
Richey	United States Navy	Edsall	destroyer escort	1,250	30 October 1943	decommissioned 1947, sunk as target 1969
Ricketts	United States Navy	Edsall	destroyer escort	1,250	5 October 1943	decommissioned 1946, sold for scrap 1974
Rigault de Genouilly	French Navy	Bougainville	aviso	1,938	14 March 1934	sunk 4 July 1940
Riley	United States Navy	Rudderow	destroyer escort	1,450	13 March 1944	to Taiwan as Tai Yuan 1968, scrapped 1996
Rizzi	United States Navy	John C. Butler	destroyer escort	1,350	26 June 1945	decommissioned 1958, sold for scrap 1974
Robert Brazier	United States Navy	John C. Butler	destroyer escort	1,350	18 May 1944	decommissioned 1946, sunk as target 1969
Robert E. Peary	United States Navy	Edsall	destroyer escort	1,250	31 May 1943	decommissioned 1947, sold for scrap 1967
Robert F. Keller	United States Navy	John C. Butler	destroyer escort	1,350	17 June 1944	decommissioned 1965, sold for scrap 1974
Robert I. Paine	United States Navy	Buckley	destroyer escort	1,400	26 February 1944	decommissioned 1947, sold for scrap 1969
Rochester	Royal Navy	Shoreham	sloop	1,105	24 March 1932	sold for scrap January 1951
Rockwood	Royal Navy	Hunt (Type III)	escort destroyer	1,050	4 November 1942	constructive loss November 1943, scrapped August 1946
Rolf	United States Navy	John C. Butler	destroyer escort	1,350	7 September 1944	decommissioned 1946, sold for scrap 1973
Rombach	United States Navy	John C. Butler	destroyer escort	1,350	20 September 1944	decommissioned 1958, sold for scrap 1972
Roy O. Hale	United States Navy	Edsall	destroyer escort	1,250	3 February 1944	decommissioned 1963, sold for scrap 1975
Royal Mount	Royal Canadian Navy	River	frigate	1,445	25 August 1944	paid off 17 November 1945
Rudderow	United States Navy	Rudderow	destroyer escort	1,450	14 May 1944	decommissioned 1947, sold for scrap 1970
Runels	United States Navy	Buckley	destroyer escort	1,400	3 January 1944	decommissioned 1947, sold for scrap 1961
Runnymede	Royal Canadian Navy	River	frigate	1,445	14 June 1944	paid off 19 January 1946
Sado	Imperial Japanese Navy	Etorofu	kaibōkan	870	27 March 1943	sunk 22 August 1944
Saint John	Royal Canadian Navy	River	frigate	1,445	13 December 1943	paid off 27 November 1945
Sakito	Imperial Japanese Navy	Hiburi	kaibōkan	940	10 January 1945	decommissioned 20 November 1945, scrapped January 1947
Samuel B. Roberts	United States Navy	John C. Butler	destroyer escort	1,370	28 April 1944	sunk 25 October 1944 Battle off Samar
Sanders	United States Navy	Evarts	destroyer escort	1,140	1 October 1943	decommissioned 1945, scrapped 1947
Sandwich	Royal Navy	Bridgewater	sloop	1,045	23 March 1929	sold for scrap 8 January 1946
Sarawak	Royal Navy	Colony	frigate	1,264	7 February 1944	Returned to USN 22 May 1946
Sausalito	United States Navy; Soviet Navy	Tacoma	frigate	1,430	4 March 1944	to Soviet Union as EK-16 16 August 1945, returned to United States 1949, to South Korea as Imchin 1952, scrapped 1973
Savage	United States Navy	Edsall	destroyer escort	1,250	29 October 1943	decommissioned 1969, sunk as target 1982
Savorgnan de Brazza	French Navy; Free French Naval Forces	Bougainville	aviso	1,938	21 February 1933	sold for scrap 20 March 1957
Scarborough	Royal Navy	Hastings	sloop	1,045	31 July 1930	scrapped 3 July 1949
Schmitt	United States Navy	Buckley	destroyer escort	1,400	24 July 1943	to Taiwan as ROCS Lung Shan 1968, scrapped 1976
Scott	United States Navy	Buckley	destroyer escort	1,400	20 July 1943	decommissioned 1947, sold for scrap 1967
Scroggins	United States Navy	Buckley	destroyer escort	1,400	30 March 1944	decommissioned 1946, sold for scrap 1967
Sea Cliff	Royal Canadian Navy	River	frigate	1,445	26 September 1944	paid off 28 November 1945
Sebago	United States Coast Guard	Owasco	cutter	2,010	20 September 1945	decommissioned 1972, scrapped 1974
Sederstrom	United States Navy	Evarts	destroyer escort	1,140	11 September 1943	decommissioned 1945, scrapped 1947
Seid	United States Navy	Evarts	destroyer escort	1,140	11 June 1943	decommissioned 1945, scrapped 1947
Sellstrom	United States Navy	Edsall	destroyer escort	1,250	12 October 1943	decommissioned 1960, sold for scrap 1967
Seychelles	Royal Navy	Colony	frigate	1,264	12 February 1944 or 27 June 1944	Returned to USN June 1946
Shelton	United States Navy	John C. Butler	destroyer escort	1,350	4 April 1944	sunk 3 October 1944
Shimushu	Imperial Japanese Navy	Shimushu	kaibōkan	870	30 June 1940	to Soviet Union as EK-31 5 July 1947, decommissioned 16 May 1959 and scrapped
Shisaka	Imperial Japanese Navy	Hiburi	kaibōkan	940	15 December 1944	to Republic of China as Huian 6 July 1947, defected to Communist China 23 April 1949, decommissioned 1990
Shōnan	Imperial Japanese Navy	Hiburi	kaibōkan	940	13 July 1944	sunk 25 February 1945
Shoreham	Royal Navy	Shoreham	sloop	1,105	2 November 1931	sold for commercial service 4 November 1946 and renamed Jorge F El Joven, scrapped November 1950
Shkval	Soviet Navy	Uragan (Series II)	guard ship	450	13 October 1932	paid off 1959
Shtorm	Soviet Navy	Uragan (Series II)	guard ship	450	5 March 1932	paid off 1959
Silverstein	United States Navy	John C. Butler	destroyer escort	1,350	14 July 1944	decommissioned 1959, sold for scrap 1973
Sims	United States Navy	Buckley	destroyer escort	1,400	24 April 1943	decommissioned 1946, sold for scrap 1961
Ślązak	Polish Navy	Hunt (Type II)	escort destroyer	1,050	9 May 1942	paid off 28 September 1946.
Sloat	United States Navy	Edsall	destroyer escort	1,250	16 August 1943	decommissioned 1947, sold for scrap 1972
Smartt	United States Navy	Evarts	destroyer escort	1,140	18 June 1943	decommissioned 1945, scrapped 1946
Smerch	Soviet Navy	Uragan (Series I)	guard ship	450	13 September 1932	sunk 8 December 1942, later raised
Sneg	Soviet Navy	Uragan (Series IV)	guard ship	450	25 September 1938	sunk 28 August 1941
Snipe	Royal Navy	Black Swan (Modified)	sloop	1,350	9 September 1946	scrapped 23 August 1960
Snowden	United States Navy	Edsall	destroyer escort	1,250	23 August 1943	decommissioned 1968, sunk as target 1969
Soemba	Royal Netherlands Navy	Flores	gunboat	1,457	12 April 1926	scrapped June/July 1985
Solar	United States Navy	Buckley	destroyer escort	1,400	15 February 1944	decommissioned and scuttled 1946
Sollum	Egyptian Navy		sloop	1,290		
Somali	Free French Naval Forces	Cannon	destroyer escort	1,240	9 April 1944	Disarmed 1956, used as an experimental vessel
Somaliland	Royal Navy	Colony	frigate	1,264	22 February 1944 or 24 July 1944	Returned to USN 22 May 1946
Southdown	Royal Navy	Hunt (Type I)	escort destroyer	1,050	8 November 1940	paid off 1946, scrapped 1956
Southwold	Royal Navy	Hunt (Type II)	escort destroyer	1,050	9 October 1941	sunk 24 March 1942
Spangenberg	United States Navy	Buckley	destroyer escort	1,400	15 April 1943	decommissioned 1947, sold for scrap 1966
Spangler	United States Navy	Buckley	destroyer escort	1,400	31 October 1943	decommissioned 1958, sold for scrap 1972
Sparrow	Royal Navy	Black Swan (Modified)	sloop	1,350	16 December 1946	scrapped 26 May 1958
Spencer	United States Coast Guard	Treasury	cutter	2,216	1 March 1937	decommissioned 1974, scrapped 1981
Springhill	Royal Canadian Navy	River	frigate	1,445	21 March 1944	paid off 1 December 1945
St. Catharines	Royal Canadian Navy	River	frigate	1,445	31 July 1943	paid off 14 December 1945
St. Helena	Royal Navy	Colony	frigate	1,264	19 February 1944	Returned to USN 8 April 1946
St. Pierre	Royal Canadian Navy	River	frigate	1,445	28 August 1944	paid off 22 November 1945
St. Stephen	Royal Canadian Navy	River	frigate	1,445	28 July 1944	paid off 30 January 1946
Stadtfeld	United States Navy	Evarts	destroyer escort	1,140	26 August 1943	decommissioned 1945, scrapped 1947
Stafford	United States Navy	John C. Butler	destroyer escort	1,350	19 April 1944	decommissioned 1946, sold for scrap 1973
Stanton	United States Navy	Edsall	destroyer escort	1,250	7 August 1943	decommissioned 1947, sunk as target 1972
Starling	Royal Navy	Black Swan (Modified)	sloop	1,350	1 April 1943	scrapped July 1965
Ste. Therese	Royal Canadian Navy	River	frigate	1,445	28 May 1944	paid off 30 January 1967
Stettler	Royal Canadian Navy	River	frigate	1,445	7 May 1944	paid off 31 August 1966
Steele	United States Navy	Evarts	destroyer escort	1,140	4 May 1943	decommissioned 1945
Stevenstone	Royal Navy	Hunt (Type III)	escort destroyer	1,050	18 March 1943	Scrapped in 1959
Stewart	United States Navy	Edsall	destroyer escort	1,250	31 May 1943	decommissioned 1947, donated as a museum ship 1974
Stockdale	United States Navy	Edsall	destroyer escort	1,250	31 December 1943	decommissioned 1946, sunk as target 1974
Stone Town	Royal Canadian Navy	River	frigate	1,445	21 July 1944	paid off 13 November 1945
Stork	Royal Navy	Bittern	sloop	1,190	10 September 1936	scrapped 1958
Stormont	Royal Canadian Navy	River	frigate	1,445	27 November 1943	paid off 9 November 1945
Strathadam	Royal Canadian Navy	River	frigate	1,445	29 September 1944	paid off 7 November 1945
Straus	United States Navy	John C. Butler	destroyer escort	1,350	6 April 1944	decommissioned 1947, sunk as target 1973
Strickland	United States Navy	Edsall	destroyer escort	1,250	10 January 1944	decommissioned 1960, sold for scrap 1974
Strule	Royal Navy; Free French Naval Forces	River	frigate	1,370	30 Jul 1943	to Free French 25 September 1944 as Croix de Lorraine, Decommissioned 1961
Sturtevant	United States Navy	Edsall	destroyer escort	1,250	16 June 1943	decommissioned 1960, sold for scrap 1973
Sublocotenent Ghiculescu	Royal Romanian Navy	Friponne	gunboat	344	1918	to Soviet Union as Angara September 1944, returned to Romania October 1945, served as survey vessel until 2002
Sussexvale	Royal Canadian Navy	River	frigate	1,445	29 November 1944	paid off 30 November 1966
Sutlej	Royal Indian Navy	Black Swan	sloop	1,250	23 April 1941	paid off late 1978, scrapped 1980.
Swale	Royal Navy; South African Navy	River	frigate	1,370	24 June 1942	to South Africa 29 July 1945 scrapped February 1955
Swan	Royal Australian Navy	Grimsby	sloop	1,060	10 December 1936	scrapped 1964
Swansea	Royal Canadian Navy	River	frigate	1,445	4 October 1943	paid off 14 October 1966
Swasey	United States Navy	Edsall	destroyer escort	1,250	31 August 1943	decommissioned 1946, sold for scrap 1974
Swenning	United States Navy	Edsall	destroyer escort	1,250	1 December 1943	decommissioned 1946, sold for scrap 1974
Tabberer	United States Navy	John C. Butler	destroyer escort	1,350	23 May 1944	decommissioned 1960, sold for scrap 1973
Tachin	Royal Thai Navy	Maeklong	sloop	1,400	10 June 1937	decommissioned 1945
Tacoma	United States Navy; Soviet Navy	Tacoma	frigate	1,430	6 November 1943	to Soviet Union as EK-11 16 August 1945, returned to United States 1949, to South Korea as Taedong 1951, preserved as museum ship 1973
Taifun	Soviet Navy	Uragan (Series I)	guard ship	450	14 September 1931	paid off 1959
Talybont	Royal Navy	Hunt (Type II)	escort destroyer	1,050		
Tanatside	Royal Navy	Hunt (Type III)	escort destroyer	1,050	4 September 1942	paid off 1946, scrapped 1964
Taney	United States Coast Guard	Treasury	cutter	2,216	24 October 1936	decommissioned 1986, preserved as museum ship
Tatum	United States Navy	Buckley	destroyer escort	1,400	22 November 1943	decommissioned 1946, sold for scrap 1961
Teme	Royal Canadian Navy	River	frigate	1,445	28 February 1944	constructive loss 29 March 1945, scrapped 1946
Tetcott	Royal Navy	Hunt (Type II)	escort destroyer	1,050	2 December 1941	scrapped 1956
Teviot	Royal Navy; South African Navy	River	frigate	1,370	30 January 1943	to South Africa 10 June 1945, scrapped 29 March 1955
Thaddeus Parker	United States Navy	John C. Butler	destroyer escort	1,350	25 October 1944	decommissioned 1967, sold for scrap 1968
Thetford Mines	Royal Canadian Navy	River	frigate	1,445	24 May 1944	paid off 18 November 1945
Thomas F. Nickel	United States Navy	Rudderow	destroyer escort	1,450	9 June 1944	decommissioned 1958, sold for scrap 1973
Thomas J. Gary	United States Navy	Edsall	destroyer escort	1,250	27 November 1943	decommissioned March 1973, transferred to Tunisia as President Bourgiba October 1973
Thomason	United States Navy	Buckley	destroyer escort	1,400	10 December 1943	decommissioned 1946, sold for scrap 1969
Tinsman	United States Navy	Rudderow	destroyer escort	1,450	26 June 1944	decommissioned 1946, sold for scrap 1973
Tisdale	United States Navy	Evarts	destroyer escort	1,140	11 October 1943	decommissioned 1945, scrapped 1948
Tobago	Royal Navy	Colony	frigate	1,264	12 August 1944	Returned to USN 13 May 1946; sold to Egypt and scuttled as a blockship in the Suez Canal, 1956
Tomich	United States Navy	Edsall	destroyer escort	1,250	27 July 1943	decommissioned 1946, sold for scrap 1974
Tomoshiri	Imperial Japanese Navy	Hiburi	kaibōkan	940		laid down 5 March 1945, 20% completed by the end of the war, scrapped 23 October 1947
Toronto	Royal Canadian Navy	River	frigate	1,445	6 May 1944	paid off 14 April 1956
Torridge	Royal Navy; Free French Naval Forces	River	frigate	1,370	1944	to Free French as La Surprise 6 June 1944.
Tortola	Royal Navy	Colony	frigate	1,264	16 May 1944	Returned to USN 22 May 1946
Transvaal	South African Navy	Loch	frigate	1,435	14 May 1945	decommissioned 14 August 1964, and sunk as artificial reef 3 August 1978
Traw	United States Navy	John C. Butler	destroyer escort	1,350	20 June 1944	decommissioned 1946, sunk as target 1968
Tsiklon	Soviet Navy	Uragan (Series I)	guard ship	450	3 July 1932	sunk 28 August 1941
Tsushima	Imperial Japanese Navy	Etorofu	kaibōkan	870	28 July 1943	to Republic of China as Lin An 31 July 1947, scrapped 1963
Tucha	Soviet Navy	Uragan (Series IV)	guard ship	450	25 September 1938	paid off 1959
Tunisien	Free French Naval Forces	Cannon	destroyer escort	1,240	11 February 1944	decommissioned May 1964
Tweedy	United States Navy	John C. Butler	destroyer escort	1,350	12 February 1944	decommissioned 1969, sunk as target 1970
Tynedale	Royal Navy	Hunt (Type I)	escort destroyer	1,050	2 December 1940	sunk 12 December 1943
Ulvert M. Moore	United States Navy	John C. Butler	destroyer escort	1,350	18 July 1944	decommissioned 1958, sunk as target 1966
Underhill	United States Navy	Buckley	destroyer escort	1,673	15 November 1943	sunk 24 July 1945
Uragan	Soviet Navy	Uragan (Series I)	guard ship	450	12 September 1931	scrapped 1959
Valleyfield	Royal Canadian Navy	River	frigate	1,445	7 December 1943	paid off 7 May 1944
Vammen	United States Navy	Buckley	destroyer escort	1,400	27 July 1944	decommissioned 1969, sunk as target 1971
Van Kinsbergen	Royal Netherlands Navy		sloop	1,760	24 August 1939	sold for scrap 19 May 1974
Vance	United States Navy	Edsall	destroyer escort	1,250	1 November 1943	decommissioned 1946, transferred to Coast Guard 1952, recommissioned into Navy 1956, decommissioned again 1969, sunk as target 1985
Varian	United States Navy	Buckley	destroyer escort	1,400	29 February 1944	decommissioned 1946, sold for scrap 1974
Victoriaville	Royal Canadian Navy	River	frigate	1,445	11 November 1944	paid off 31 December 1973
Vikhr	Soviet Navy	Uragan (Series I)	guard ship	450	12 September 1932	sunk 21 September 1941, later raised
Vyuga	Soviet Navy	Uragan (Series I)	guard ship	450	18 November 1934	converted to training ship 1945
Wakamiya	Imperial Japanese Navy	Etorofu	kaibōkan	870	10 August 1943	sunk 24 May 1944
Walter C. Wann	United States Navy	John C. Butler	destroyer escort	1,350	2 May 1944	decommissioned 1946, sold for scrap 1969
Walter S. Brown	United States Navy	Evarts	destroyer escort	1,140	25 June 1943	decommissioned 1945, scrapped 1946
Walton	United States Navy	John C. Butler	destroyer escort	1,350	4 September 1944	decommissioned 1968, sunk as target 1969
Warrego	Royal Australian Navy	Grimsby	sloop	1,060	21 August 1940	scrapped 1965
Waskesiu	Royal Canadian Navy	River	frigate	1,445	16 June 1943	paid off 29 January 1946
Weber	United States Navy	Buckley	destroyer escort	1,400	30 June 1943	decommissioned 1947, sunk as target 1962
Weeden	United States Navy	Buckley	destroyer escort	1,400	19 February 1944	decommissioned 1958, sold for scrap 1969
Wellington	Royal Navy	Grimsby (Group 1)	sloop	990	24 January 1935	sold 1947, currently as headquarters ship of Honourable Company of Master Mariners
Wensleydale	Royal Navy	Hunt (Type III)	escort destroyer	1,050	20 October 1942	constructive loss 11 December 1944
Wentworth	Royal Canadian Navy	River	frigate	1,445	7 December 1943	paid off 10 October 1945
Weston	Royal Navy	Shoreham	sloop	1,105	23 February 1933	scrapped 22 May 1947
Whaddon	Royal Navy	Hunt (Type I)	escort destroyer	1,000	28 February 1941	broken up April 1959
Wheatland	Royal Navy	Hunt (Type II)	escort destroyer	1,050	3 November 1941	paid off 19 June 1945, scrapped 20 September 1959
Whimbrel	Royal Navy	Black Swan	sloop	1,250	13 January 1943	transferred to Egypt as El Malek Farouq November 1949, renamed Tarik 1954, in active service with Egyptian Navy
Whitehurst	United States Navy	Buckley	destroyer escort	1,400	19 November 1943	decommissioned 1962, sunk as target 1971
Whitman	United States Navy	Evarts	destroyer escort	1,140	3 July 1943	decommissioned 1945, scrapped 1947
Wild Goose	Royal Navy	Black Swan	sloop	1,250	11 March 1943	sold for scrap 27 February 1956
Wileman	United States Navy	Evarts	destroyer escort	1,140	11 June 1943	decommissioned 1945, scrapped 1947
Wilhoite	United States Navy	Edsall	destroyer escort	1,250	16 December 1943	decommissioned 1969, sold for scrap 191972
William C. Cole	United States Navy	Buckley	destroyer escort	1,400	12 May 1944	decommissioned 1948, sold for scrap 1972
William C. Miller	United States Navy	Evarts	destroyer escort	1,140	2 July 1943	decommissioned 1945, scrapped 1947
William Seiverling	United States Navy	John C. Butler	destroyer escort	1,350	1 June 1944	decommissioned 1957, sold for scrap 1973
William T. Powell	United States Navy	Buckley	destroyer escort	1,400	28 March 1944	decommissioned 1958, sold for scrap 1966
Williams	United States Navy	John C. Butler	destroyer escort	1,350	11 November 1944	decommissioned 1946, sunk as target 1968
Willis	United States Navy	Edsall	destroyer escort	1,250	10 December 1943	decommissioned 1946, sold for scrap 1972
Willmarth	United States Navy	Buckley	destroyer escort	1,400	13 March 1944	decommissioned 1946, sold for scrap 1968
Wilton	Royal Navy	Hunt (Type II)	escort destroyer	1,050	18 February 1942	paid off 19 June 1945, scrapped 1959
Windrush	Royal Navy Free French Naval Forces	River	frigate	1,370	February 1944	to France February 1944 as Découverte. Decommissioned 1959
Winnebago	United States Coast Guard	Owasco	cutter	2,010	21 June 1945	decommissioned 1973, scrapped 1974
Wintle	United States Navy	Evarts	destroyer escort	1,140	10 July 1943	decommissioned 1945, scrapped 1947
Wiseman	United States Navy	Buckley	destroyer escort	1,400	4 April 1944	decommissioned 1973, sold for scrap 1974
Witter	United States Navy	Buckley	destroyer escort	1,400	29 December 1943	decommissioned 1945, scrapped 1946
Woodcock	Royal Navy	Black Swan (Modified)	sloop	1,350	29 May 1943	sold for scrap 28 November 1955
Woodpecker	Royal Navy	Black Swan	sloop	1,250	14 December 1942	sunk 27 February 1944.
Woodson	United States Navy	John C. Butler	destroyer escort	1,350	24 August 1944	decommissioned 1962, sold for scrap 1966
Wren	Royal Navy	Black Swan	sloop	1,250	4 February 1943	sold for scrap 2 February 1956
Wyffels	United States Navy; Republic of China Navy	Evarts	destroyer escort	1,140	15 April 1943	to Republic of China as Tai Kang 28 August 1945, scrapped 1972
Wyman	United States Navy	Evarts	destroyer escort	1,140	1 September 1943	decommissioned 1945, scrapped 1947
Yarra	Royal Australian Navy	Grimsby	sloop	1,060	19 December 1935	sunk 4 March 1942
Yashiro	Imperial Japanese Navy	Mikura	kaibōkan	940	10 May 1944	to Republic of China as Cheng An 29 August 1947, scrapped 1963
Yastreb	Soviet Navy	Yastreb (Project 29)	guard ship	829	30 December 1944	scrapped 12 September 1959
Zarnitsa	Soviet Navy	Uragan (Series III)	guard ship	450	6 November 1936	paid off 1959
Zanzibar	Royal Navy	Colony	frigate	1,264	21 June 1944	Returned to USN 31 May 1946
Zetland	Royal Navy	Hunt (Type II)	escort destroyer	1,050	27 June 1942	paid off 20 April 1946, scrapped 1965
