= HNLMS Friso =

HNLMS Friso (Dutch: Hr.Ms. Friso) may refer to the following ships of the Royal Netherlands Navy that have been named after Johan Willem Friso.

- HNLMS Friso (1915), a Brinio-class gunboat sunk during the defence of the Netherlands at the start of the Second World War.
- HNLMS Friso (K00), a Flower-class corvette commissioned into the Royal Netherlands Navy in 1943.
