= DE261 =

DE261 may refer to:

- Delaware Route 261
- JDS Wakaba (DE-261)
- USS Dionne (DE-261)
