= Escort destroyer =

Type of warship

An escort destroyer was a small warship built to full naval standards which was optimised for air-defence and anti-submarine duties in wartime, but which retained many of the capabilities of a traditional fleet destroyer, enabling it to conduct operations in conjunction with main fleet units as well as carrying out convoy escort and ASW patrols. Typically, escort destroyers had a high enough speed and sufficient armament of guns and torpedoes that they were capable of skirmishing successfully with enemy destroyers and cruisers.

An escort destroyer with United States Navy hull classification symbol DDE was a destroyer (DD) modified for and assigned to a fleet escort role after World War II. These destroyers retained their original hull numbers. Later, in March 1950, the post World War II ASW destroyer (DDK) classification was merged with the DDE classification, resulting in all DDK ships being reclassified as DDE, but again retaining their original hull numbers. On 30 June 1962, the DDE classification was retired, and all DDEs were reclassified as destroyers (DD).

Escort destroyers should not be confused with the cheaper, slower, less capable, and more lightly armed World War II destroyer escorts.

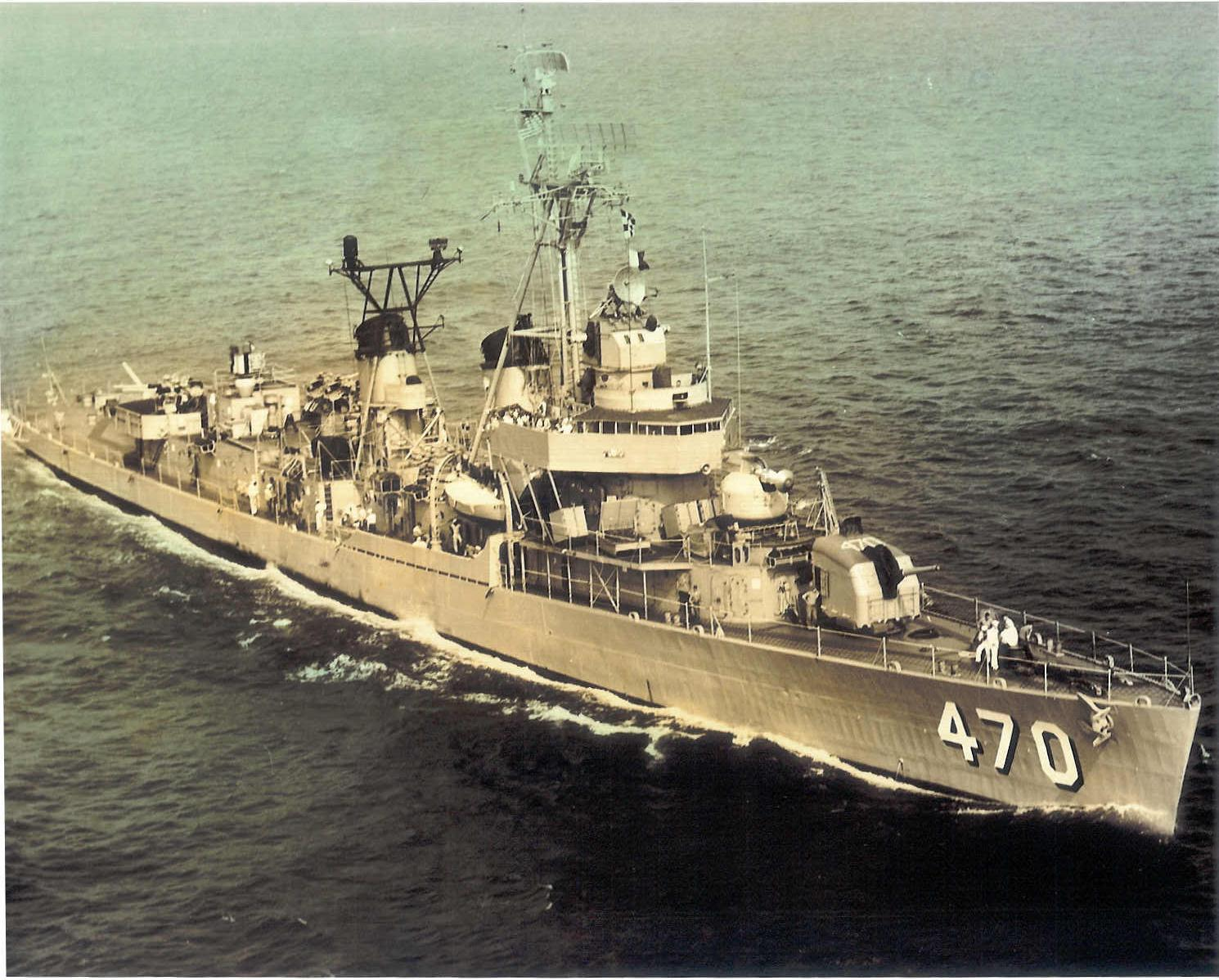
USS Bache following DDE conversion with Weapon Alpha replacing mount 52.

== Concept ==
Following the outbreak of World War II, the Royal Navy had inadequate numbers of warships suitable for escort of trade convoys. While more modern destroyers were assigned to screen capital ships, destroyers built during World War I were modified to serve as trade convoy escorts. Four V and W-class destroyers were re-armed with modern anti-aircraft and anti-submarine weapons. Additional V & W destroyers received simpler modifications as shipyard resources became taxed by other wartime needs. The quarterdeck gun was removed to increase depth charge storage, and the after bank of torpedo tubes was replaced by a 3-inch (76 mm) anti-aircraft gun for escort of convoys in European coastal waters. Destroyers escorting trans-Atlantic convoys also replaced the forecastle gun with hedgehog, removed all torpedo tubes to improve seaworthiness, and replaced one boiler with additional fuel storage to increase range. Similar modifications were made to former United States destroyers obtained through the Destroyers for Bases Agreement. Anticipating a possible need to defend convoys supplying NATO allies, the United States Navy modified older destroyers during the Cold War. In the absence of hostilities requiring escort of merchant shipping, escort destroyers operated with anti-submarine warfare carrier (CVS) hunter-killer groups. Operational doctrine anticipated each CVS would be accompanied by eight DDEs. Four DDEs would provide a close screen for the CVS while the other four attacked submarines detected by aircraft.

== Gearing class ==
Gearing class conversions were modified by replacing the B position 5"/38 caliber guns (mount 52) with either RUR-4 Weapon Alpha or hedgehog. A second Weapon Alpha was sometimes installed at the aft end of the 01 level above the aft 5"/38 gun mount.

== Fletcher class ==
Fletcher class conversions removed all torpedo tubes and three 5"/38 caliber gun mounts to retain only the main deck mounts fore and aft. A Weapon Alpha replaced the B position gun mount.

Similar modifications were made by the Royal Navy, usually to older, World War I era vessels, to fit them for specific tasks such as convoy work.

== See also ==
- Destroyer escort
- Ocean escort
