= USS Tweedy =

John C. Butler-class destroyer escort in the US Navy

USS Tweedy (DE-532)
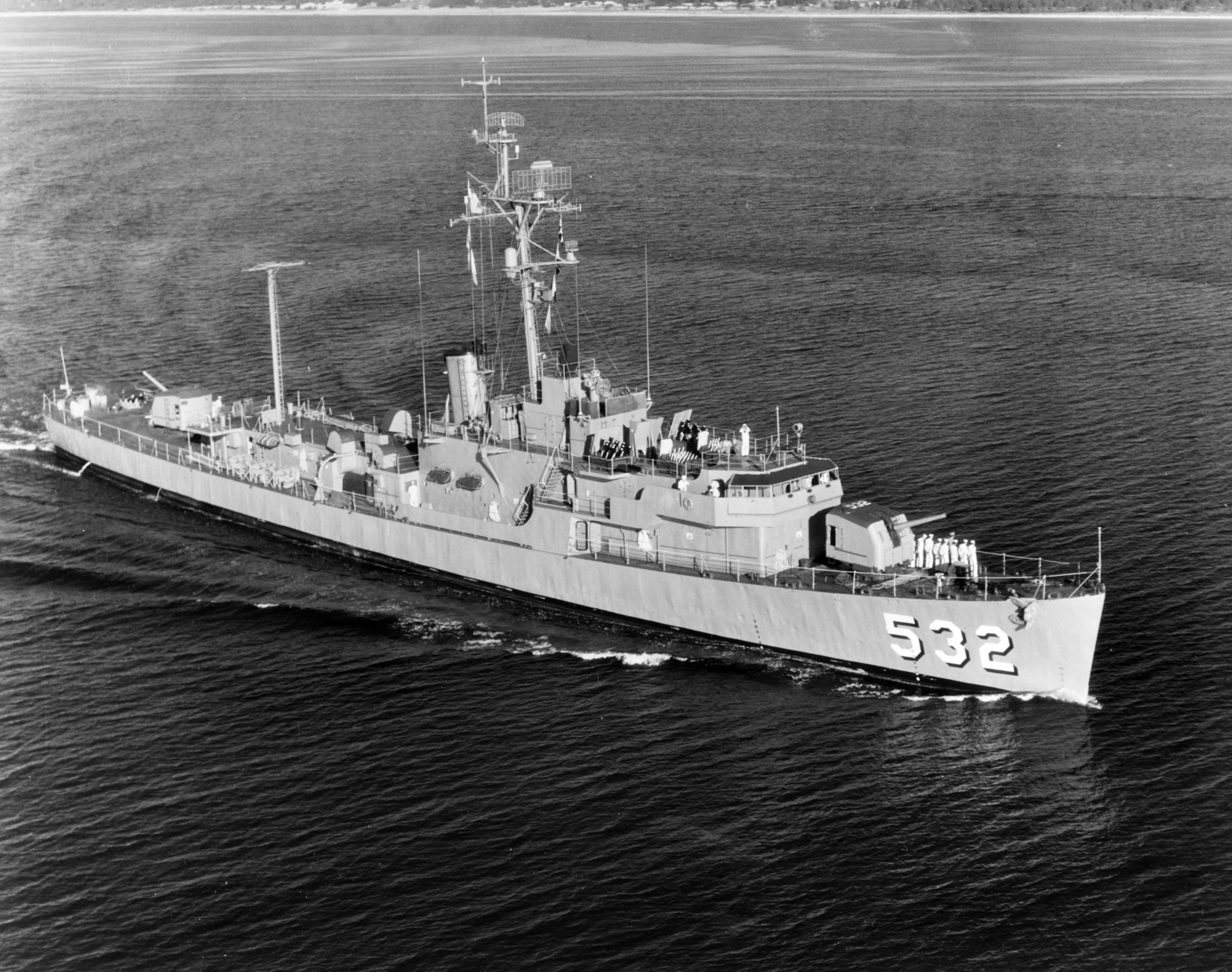

History

United States
- Namesake: Albert William Tweedy, Jr.
- Laid down: 31 August 1943
- Launched: 7 October 1943
- Sponsored by: Mrs. Albert William Tweedy
- Commissioned: 12 February 1944 – 10 May 1946 (in reserve); 2 April 1952 – 20 June 1959 (in reserve); 2 October 1961 – 1 August 1962 (in reserve)
- Decommissioned: 30 June 1969
- Stricken: 30 June 1969
- Fate: Sunk as target off Florida May 1970

General characteristics
- Displacement: 1,350 long tons (1,372 t)
- Length: 306 ft (93 m) (LOA)
- Beam: 36 ft 10 in (11.23 m)
- Draft: 13 ft 4 in (4.06 m) (max)
- Propulsion: 2 boilers, 2 geared steam turbines, 12,000 shp (8,900 kW), 2 screws
- Speed: 24 knots (44 km/h; 28 mph)
- Range: 6,000 nmi (11,000 km; 6,900 mi) at 12 knots (22 km/h; 14 mph)
- Complement: 14 officers, 201 enlisted
- Armament: 2 × 5"/38 guns; 4 × (2×2) 40 mm AA guns; 10 × 20 mm AA guns; 3 × 21-inch (533 mm) torpedo tubes; 1 × Hedgehog; 8 × depth charge throwers; 2 × depth charge tracks

USS Tweedy (DE-532) was a John C. Butler-class destroyer escort in service with the United States Navy from 1944 to 1946 and from 1952 to 1969. She was sunk as a target in 1970.

== Namesake ==
Albert William Tweedy Jr., was born on 22 March 1920 and attended public schools in Winnetka, Illinois and Hingham, Massachusetts. He enrolled at Williams College, Williamstown, Massachusetts, in late 1938. In the summer of 1939, he completed United States Marine Corps' Platoon Commander School at Marine Corps Base Quantico, Virginia and, at the end of his second year, left college to become a Marine Aviation Cadet. Following flight training at Naval Air Station Squantum, Massachusetts and Naval Air Station Pensacola, Florida, he was commissioned a Second Lieutenant in the United States Marine Corps Reserve on 14 October 1941.

Assigned to the 2nd Marine Aircraft Wing, Fleet Marine Force, he was stationed at San Diego and Hawaii before reporting for duty with Marine Scouter-Bomber Squadron (VMSB)-241 at Midway Atoll early in 1942. He served as Assistant Flight Officer and Assistant Communications Officer for the squadron before becoming its Communications Officer late in May.

Early on the morning of 4 June 1942, he took off from Midway in his Douglas SBD Dauntless dive-bomber. Minutes later, the Battle of Midway commenced as planes from the Imperial Japanese Navy carriers pounded the Marine installations on Midway, and outdated American fighter planes based at Midway were dispatched by the newer and nimbler Japanese Mitsubishi A6M Zeros in the opening stages of the battle. VMSB-241 attempted a glide-bombing attack on the aircraft carrier Hiryū. Despite a fearsome antiaircraft barrage and repeated attacks by the numerically superior enemy fighter planes, Lt. Tweedy dove his aircraft to a perilously low altitude before releasing a bomb over the carrier. Japanese fighters then attacked and shot down Tweedy's plane. He was posthumously awarded the Navy Cross.

== History ==
Tweedy was laid down on 31 August 1943 by the Boston Navy Yard; launched on 7 October 1943; sponsored by Mrs. Albert William Tweedy, Lt. Tweedy's mother; and commissioned on 12 February 1944.

=== World War II North Atlantic operations ===
On completion of her fitting out, Tweedy departed Boston, Massachusetts, on 1 March and steamed for Bermuda where she conducted shakedown exercises through the end of the month. En route from Bermuda to Boston on 30 and 31 March, the destroyer escort conducted an unproductive 13-hour search for a German submarine known to be lurking in the coastal shipping lanes.

=== Assigned training ship duties ===
She began April moored in Boston, then moved south for firing tests in the Chesapeake Bay before arriving at Miami, Florida, on the 18th. There, she began the duties which were to occupy her throughout most of World War II. Assigned to the Naval Training Center, Miami, she operated off the Florida Keys, conducting indoctrination cruises for student officers and nucleus crews. Occasionally putting in at Charleston, South Carolina, for repairs or alterations, she continued in this essential but inconspicuous role, supplying the fleets with trained personnel, into the early months of 1945. In April 1945, she rescued six downed aviators from a Navy flying boat and conducted a submarine search north of San Salvador.

In June 1945, she put in at Charleston to undergo availability in preparation for assignment to Destroyer Escort Division 63. From mid-June until late October, she participated in exercises in Casco Bay with that division. On 21 October, she moored at Boston for Navy Day activities. The ship got underway on 8 November, bound for Florida, and arrived at Green Cove Springs, Florida, on the 11th. There, she prepared for inactivation. On 10 May 1946, she was decommissioned and placed in reserve.

=== Recommissioned as a training ship ===
Towed from her Florida berth late in March 1949, she underwent conversion and repairs at Charleston and Bath, Maine, which continued into the autumn of 1950. She arrived at Boston in November 1950 and remained there until she was recommissioned on 2 April 1952. Tweedy was the only destroyer escort to receive the full SCB 63 anti-submarine warfare conversion, including a new superstructure forward with four Hedgehogs mounted above the bridge, which was moved on the 01 level. Following exercises out of Guantanamo Bay, Cuba, she finished out the year as a training ship for the Fleet Sonar School at Key West, Florida.

For the next three years, Tweedy conducted reserve training and midshipman cruises in addition to assignments at the Fleet Sonar School at Key West and participated in the annual Operation Springboard in the Caribbean. In 1956, she added submarine hunter-killer exercises in the North Atlantic Ocean, during which she tested new antisubmarine warfare equipment, to her activities. Late in the summer of 1957, she was deployed on her first Mediterranean cruise and, before returning to Key West in November, participated in Operation Deepwater.

=== Conversion to Naval Reserve training ===
In June 1958, Tweedy became a Naval Reserve training ship. Following refresher training in Cuban waters, she assumed duties as flagship for Reserve Escort Squadron 4, training reservists from the 6th Naval District. The ship was placed out of commission, in reserve, on 20 June 1959, but she conducted weekend training cruises out of Pensacola, Florida, for over two years.

=== Reactivated during the Berlin crisis ===
In response to the Berlin Crisis of August 1961, Tweedy was recommissioned on 2 October of that year. Following refresher training, she was assigned the home port of Newport, Rhode Island, and commenced antisubmarine barrier duties in the Caribbean early in 1962. Throughout the year, she engaged in fleet and type exercises, made goodwill visits, and served as flagship for Escort Squadron 12. On 12 June, as Tweedy steamed from Pensacola to Norfolk, Virginia, she came upon nine Cuban nationals in distress after two days at sea in an open, 14-foot boat. Tweedy aided the refugees and, later in the day, transferred them to U.S. Coast Guard representatives for assistance on their way to Miami.

On 1 August 1962, the destroyer escort was again decommissioned and returned to reserve training ship status. Operating out of Florida ports, she continued in that capacity until late in May 1969 when she departed St. Petersburg, Florida, for the last time.

=== Final decommissioning ===
On 29 May, she arrived at Orange, Texas, for inactivation and on 30 June 1969, her name was stricken from the Navy list. In March 1970, she was assigned to Naval Air Atlantic for destruction as a target. She was sunk as target off Florida in May 1970.
