= Yastreb-class guard ship =

Soviet guard ship class

- Yastreb

Class overview
- Name: Yastreb
- Operators: Soviet Navy
- Preceded by: Uragan class
- Succeeded by: Kola class
- Subclasses: Project 29K
- Built: 1939–1951
- In service: 1944–1969
- Planned: 20
- Completed: 6
- Canceled: 5
- Lost: 9

General characteristics (Project 29)
- Type: Guard ship
- Displacement: 842 tonnes (829 long tons; 928 short tons) (standard); 995 tonnes (979 long tons; 1,097 short tons) (full load)
- Length: 85.7 m (281 ft 2 in)
- Beam: 8.4 m (27 ft 7 in)
- Draught: 2.6 m (8 ft 6 in)
- Propulsion: 2-shaft geared steam turbines; 2 boilers; 23,000 shp (17,000 kW)
- Speed: 34 knots (39 mph; 63 km/h)
- Endurance: 2,700 nmi (5,000 km) at 15 knots (28 km/h)
- Complement: 112 men
- Armament: 3 × 1 - 100 mm (3.9 in) B-34 guns; 4 × 1 - 12.7 mm (0.50 in) AA machine guns; 1 × 3 - 456 mm (18.0 in) torpedo tubes; up to 40 mines

The Yastreb-class guard ships were built for the Soviet Navy as small patrol and escort ships. Fifteen out of twenty planned ships were laid down before the start of Operation Barbarossa. Only one was completed during World War II. Five others were completed after the war, but five were scrapped on the stocks at Nikolayev when it was captured by the Germans in late 1941. Four were scrapped by the Soviets at Leningrad and five were cancelled before they were laid down. The postwar ships were completed to a modified design as Project 29K. One of these was transferred to the NKVD. The last of the ships was scrapped in 1975.

== Design ==
The Yastreb-class guard ships were designed to replace the unsatisfactory Uragan-class guard ship that preceded them. The Uragans had proven to be too small for the weight of their armament, too slow and had poor seakeeping capabilities due to their excessive top-weight. Despite being almost twice the displacement of the older ships, the Yastreb were equipped with only one additional main gun. This was done to minimize the stability problems experienced by their predecessors.

=== General characteristics ===
The Project 29 ships were longer than their predecessors at 85.7 m (281 ft) overall. They had a beam of 8.4 m (28 ft) and, at full load, a draft of 2.6 m (8.5 ft). They were significantly heavier than the Uragan class; the Yastreb-class ships displaced 842 metric tons (829 long tons) at a standard load, and 995 metric tons (980 long tons) at full load, nearly twice the 457 metric tons (400 long tons) at standard load of the earlier ships. The Project 29K ships had a deeper draft of 3.3 m (11 ft) at full load and they were slightly heavier than their half-sister; they displaced 905 metric tons (891 long tons) at a standard load, and 1,059 metric tons (1,040 long tons) at full load. Their crew increased to 127 men, an increase of 15 men over Yastreb.

=== Armament ===
The intended main armament was three single 100 mm (3.9 in) B-34 guns, protected by gun shields. Some ships reportedly substituted the B-34 guns for three of the naval version 85 mm (3.3 in) 52-K anti-aircraft guns. Four 12.7 mm (0.50 in) AA machine guns were also carried. The underwater armament consisted of one triple 456 mm (18.0 in) torpedo tube mount, fitted between the funnels and up to 40 mines.

=== Propulsion ===
Yastreb had 2 shaft geared steam turbines producing 23,000 shp (17,000 kW) that propelled her to 34 knots (39 mph; 63 km/h). Her endurance was 2,700 nmi (5,000 km) at 15 knots (28 km/h). The Project 29K ships used the same machinery, but were half a knot slower and had only a range of 2,200 nmi (4,070 km) at 15 knots (28 km/h).

== Construction ==
The construction of all the Project 29 ships was interrupted by Operation Barbarossa in 1941. Those ships furthest along were suspended for the duration of the war, although Yastreb, as the lead ship of the class, was just over half-complete on 22 June 1941. It was finished at the end of 1944 after the Siege of Leningrad was broken in early 1944. Most of the others were scrapped or cancelled. Eleven more ships were intended to be laid down in 1942 and another eight in 1943, but the war ended that plan.

Five other ships had made significant progress before the Germans invaded and were completed to a revised design, Project 29K, after the war. These were slightly larger, added four single 37 mm (1.5 in) 61-K AA guns, and a pair of depth charge throwers in lieu of the mines.

The six ships that were to start construction at the Ordzhonikidze Shipyard in Sevastopol actually had their material prepared at Marti South in Nikolayev and shipped to Sevastopol for building. Similarly the three ships launched, but not completed by the end of the war at the Zhandov Shipyard in Leningrad, were towed to the former Schichau-Werke shipyard in Kaliningrad for completion.

== Ships ==
Project 29
| Ship | Builder | Laid down | Launched | Commissioned | Fate |
|---|---|---|---|---|---|
| Yastreb | Zhdanov, Leningrad | 23 May 1939 | 10 June 1940 | 30 December 1944 | scrapped 12 September 1959 |
| Bditel'nyi | Zhdanov, Leningrad | 23 May 1940 | | | Never completed and scrapped |
| Tigr | Ordzhonikidze, Sevastopol | 1940 | | | scrapped on the stocks by the Germans |
| Leopard | Ordzhonikidze, Sevastopol | 1940 | | | scrapped on the stocks by the Germans |
| Rys' | Ordzhonikidze, Sevastopol | 1941 | | | scrapped on the stocks by the Germans |
| Yaguar | Ordzhonikidze, Sevastopol | 1941 | | | scrapped on the stocks by the Germans |
| Kuguar | Ordzhonikidze, Sevastopol | 1941 | | | scrapped on the stocks by the Germans |
| Pantera | Ordzhonikidze, Sevastopol | 1941 | | | not laid down, cancelled |
| Berkut | Zhdanov, Leningrad | August 1940 | | | scrapped on the stocks |
| Sokol' | Zhdanov, Leningrad | October 1940 | | | scrapped on the stocks |
| Grif | Zhdanov, Leningrad | May 1941 | | | scrapped on the stocks |
| Voron | Zhdanov, Leningrad | | | | Canceled 19 July 1941 |
| Kondor | Zhdanov, Leningrad | | | | Canceled 19 July 1941 |
| Fregate | Shipyard 199, Komsomolsk-on-Amur | | | | Canceled |
| Orlan | Shipyard 199, Komsomolsk-on-Amur | | | | Canceled |
Project 29K
| Orel | Zhdanov, Leningrad | 28 May 1939 | 12 February 1941 | 21 December 1950 | scrapped 18 September 1969 |
| Korshun | Zhdanov, Leningrad | 25 October 1939 | 28 May 1941 | 21 January 1951 | scrapped 31 January 1961 |
| Zorkii | Zhdanov, Leningrad | 23 May 1940 | 31 October 1940 | 30 January 1950 | scrapped 4 November 1975 |
| Burevestnik | Shipyard 199, Komsomolsk-on-Amur | 4 December 1939 | 17 July 1943 | 15 July 1947 | scrapped 28 January 1958 |
| Al'batros | Shipyard 199, Komsomolsk-on-Amur | 4 December 1939 | 2 June 1944 | 29 September 1945 | scrapped 28 February 1961 |

== Career ==
Little is known about their careers. Yastreb reportedly became a training ship on 17 February 1956. It became a target ship on 31 August 1956 and was then sold for scrap on 12 September 1959. Orel became a floating barracks on 31 January 1964 before being sold for scrap on 18 September 1969. Korshun may have been transferred to the Border Guards for several years before it was returned to the Navy in 1952. She was sold for scrap 31 January 1964. Zorkii also appears to have been transferred to the Border Guards upon completion before it was returned to the Navy in 1952. She became a training ship on 18 October 1956 and was sold for scrap on 4 November 1975. Burevestnik became a training ship on 17 February 1956 and was sold for scrap on 28 January 1958. Al'batros also became a training ship at the same time and was sold for scrap on 28 February 1961.
