= USS Dionne =

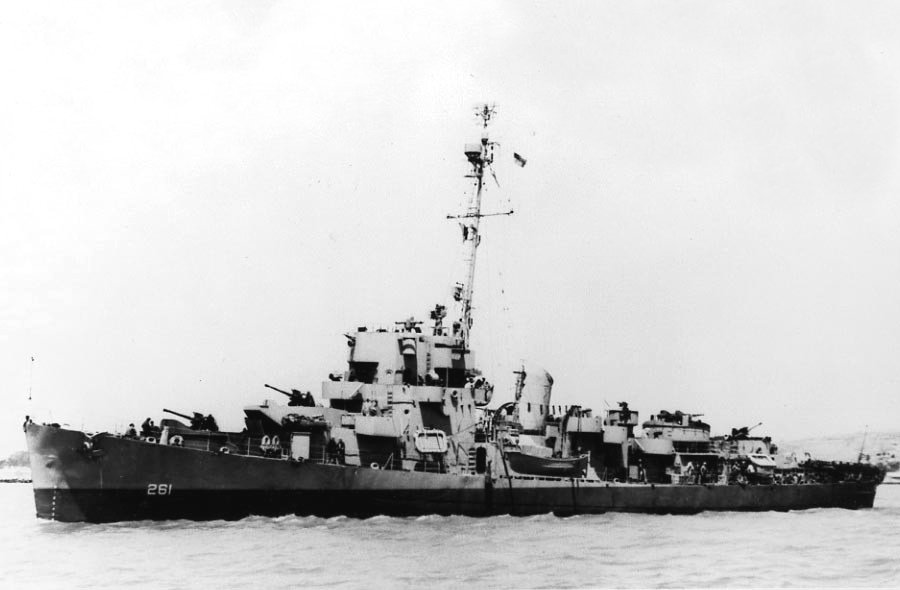
- Dionne underway on 21 May 1945

History

United States
- Name: USS Dionne
- Builder: Boston Navy Yard
- Laid down: 27 January 1943
- Launched: 10 March 1943
- Commissioned: 16 July 1943
- Decommissioned: 18 January 1946
- Stricken: 7 February 1946
- Honors and awards: 6 battle stars (World War II)
- Fate: Sold for scrapping, 12 June 1947

General characteristics
- Type: Evarts-class destroyer escort
- Displacement: 1,140 long tons (1,158 t) standard; 1,430 long tons (1,453 t) full
- Length: 289 ft 5 in (88.21 m) o/a; 283 ft 6 in (86.41 m) w/l
- Beam: 35 ft 2 in (10.72 m)
- Draft: 11 ft (3.4 m) (max)
- Propulsion: 4 × General Motors Model 16-278A diesel engines with electric drive, 6,000 shp (4,474 kW); 2 screws
- Speed: 19 knots (35 km/h; 22 mph)
- Range: 4,150 nmi (7,690 km)
- Complement: 15 officers and 183 enlisted
- Armament: 3 × single 3"/50 Mk.22 dual-purpose guns; 1 × quad 1.1"/75 Mk.2 AA gun; 9 × 20 mm Mk.4 AA guns; 1 × Hedgehog Projector Mk.10 (144 rounds); 8 × Mk.6 depth charge projectors; 2 × Mk.9 depth charge tracks

USS Dionne (DE-261) was an Evarts-class destroyer escort of the United States Navy during World War II. She was sent off into the Pacific Ocean to protect convoys and other ships from Japanese submarines and fighter aircraft. She performed escort and antisubmarine operations in dangerous battle areas and returned home with six battle stars, a high number for a ship of her type.

== Design ==
The Evarts-class destroyer escorts were 289 ft 5 in (88.21 m) long overall, and they had a beam of 35 ft 2 in (10.72 m). They had an average draft of 10 ft 1 in (3.07 m) at their full load displacement of 1,416 long tons (1,439 t). Each ship had a normal crew numbered 156 officers and sailors.

Dionne was propelled by a pair of diesel motors manufactured by General Motors, which drove a pair of screw propellers. Her propulsion system was rated to produce 6,000 brake horsepower (4,500 kW) for a top speed of 19.5 knots (36.1 km/h; 22.4 mph). Oil storage amounted to between 131 and 197 long tons (133 and 200 t), which allowed a cruising radius of up to 6,000 nautical miles (11,000 km; 6,900 mi) at an economical pace of 10 knots (19 km/h; 12 mph).

The ship's armament consisted of a main battery of three 3-inch (76 mm) /50-caliber guns in individual pivot mounts, which could be used against air or surface targets. These were supported by a light anti-aircraft battery that initially consisted of four 1.1 in (28 mm) /75-caliber guns in a quadruple mount and nine 20 mm (0.79 in) Oerlikon guns. For attacks against submarines, the ship was equipped with a Hedgehog mortar, eight depth charge throwers, and two depth charge racks.

== Service history ==
Named for Arthur Dionne, a naval officer killed during the Battle of Tassafaronga, Dionne was launched on 10 March 1943 by Boston Navy Yard; sponsored by Mrs. L. A. Dionne, mother of the namesake. The ship was commissioned on 16 July 1943.

Dionne sailed from Boston, Massachusetts, on 7 September 1943 to escort a convoy to Norfolk, Virginia. She conducted training in the Chesapeake Bay area until 2 October when she got underway for the Pacific Ocean. Arriving at Pearl Harbor on 26 October she was assigned to night radar picket duty and on 15 November she sortied for the invasion of the Gilbert Islands. Dionne screened a group of tankers serving the ships engaged in this operation until her return to Pearl Harbor on 12 January 1944 for repairs. From 4 February to 1 March 1944 Dionne served in the Marshalls operation, escorting convoys and acting as harbor guard at Kwajalein. After an overhaul at Mare Island, California, from 9 March to 8 April she sailed to Kwajalein and Eniwetok as convoy escort, then returned to Pearl Harbor on 10 May to rehearse amphibious landings.

Dionne sailed from Pearl Harbor on 1 June 1944 for the invasion of the Marianas. She patrolled by day and screened transports at night, picking up seven Japanese prisoners and a 9-year-old Japanese girl. On 21 June she screened California (BB-44) during her bombardment of Saipan. From 25 June to 16 July she was at Eniwetok to replenish, returning to Guam for a pre-invasion bombardment on 20 and 21 July and to provide fire support for the landings of 21 July. Three days later she bombarded Tinian, off which she patrolled until returning to Pearl Harbor on 3 September. On 23 September 1944 Dionne departed for Ulithi carrying garrison forces. She remained there from 8 to 24 October on patrol and local escort duty. After escorting ships to Eniwetok and Saipan, she returned to Pearl Harbor on 23 November as screen for Salmon (SS-182), damaged by Japanese depth charges, and Holland (AS-3). Dionne served in anti-submarine warfare exercises and amphibious training in the Hawaiian Islands until 20 January 1945 when she began convoy duty between Pearl Harbor and Eniwetok.

Dionne sailed from Eniwetok on 21 February 1945 for Saipan and Iwo Jima, landing her garrison group there on 7 March. She patrolled off Iwo Jima until 20 March, then sailed for Pearl Harbor with evacuated combat troops, arriving on 4 April. Four days later she got underway for San Francisco, California, and overhaul. Returning to Pearl Harbor on 15 June 1945 Dionne escorted convoys to Eniwetok and Ulithi. On 25 July she departed Ulithi to join the oilers serving the 3rd Fleet during their strikes on the Japanese mainland, duty which occupied her until the end of the war.

From 4 September she screened oilers fueling ships of the 7th Fleet operating in the Yellow Sea and off Jinsen, Korea. Dionne sailed from Jinsen on 5 October for Pearl Harbor and the west coast, arriving at San Francisco on 25 November. She was decommissioned on 18 January 1946. Dionne was sold on 12 June 1947.

== Awards ==
Dionne received six battle stars for World War II service.
