= Brinio-class gunboat =

Royal Netherlands Navy gunboat class

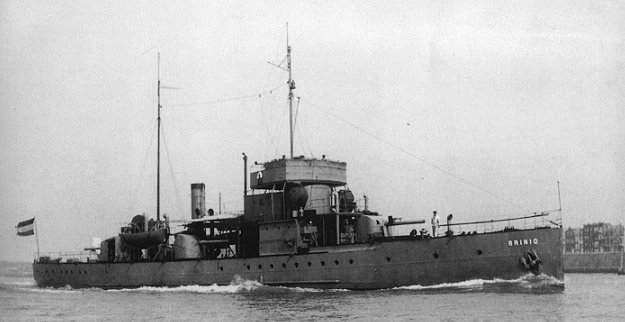
- Brinio

Class overview
- Name: Brinio class
- Builders: Rijkswerf, Amsterdam
- Operators: Royal Netherlands Navy
- Completed: 3
- Lost: 2
- Retired: 1

General characteristics
- Type: Gunboat
- Displacement: Brinio: 545 tons; 634 tons (full load); Gruno: 533 tons; 581 tons (full load); Friso: 530 tons; 573 tons (full load)
- Length: 52.66 m (172 ft 9 in)
- Beam: 8.52 m (27 ft 11 in)
- Draught: 2.75 m (9 ft 0 in)
- Propulsion: 2 × 750 ihp (560 kW), two shafts (Brinio and Friso); 2 × 600 ihp (450 kW), two shafts (Gruno)
- Speed: 14 knots (26 km/h) - 15 knots (28 km/h)
- Complement: 52; 63 (WW II)
- Armament: 4 × 10.5 cm (4.1 in)
- Armour: 1.7 cm (0.67 in) deck; 5.5 cm (2.2 in) belt; 5 centimetres (2.0 in) Conning tower

The Brinio class (sometimes referred to as Gruno class) was a class of three gunboats built by the Rijkswerf in Amsterdam for the Royal Netherlands Navy. The class comprised Gruno, Brinio and Friso.

== Service history ==
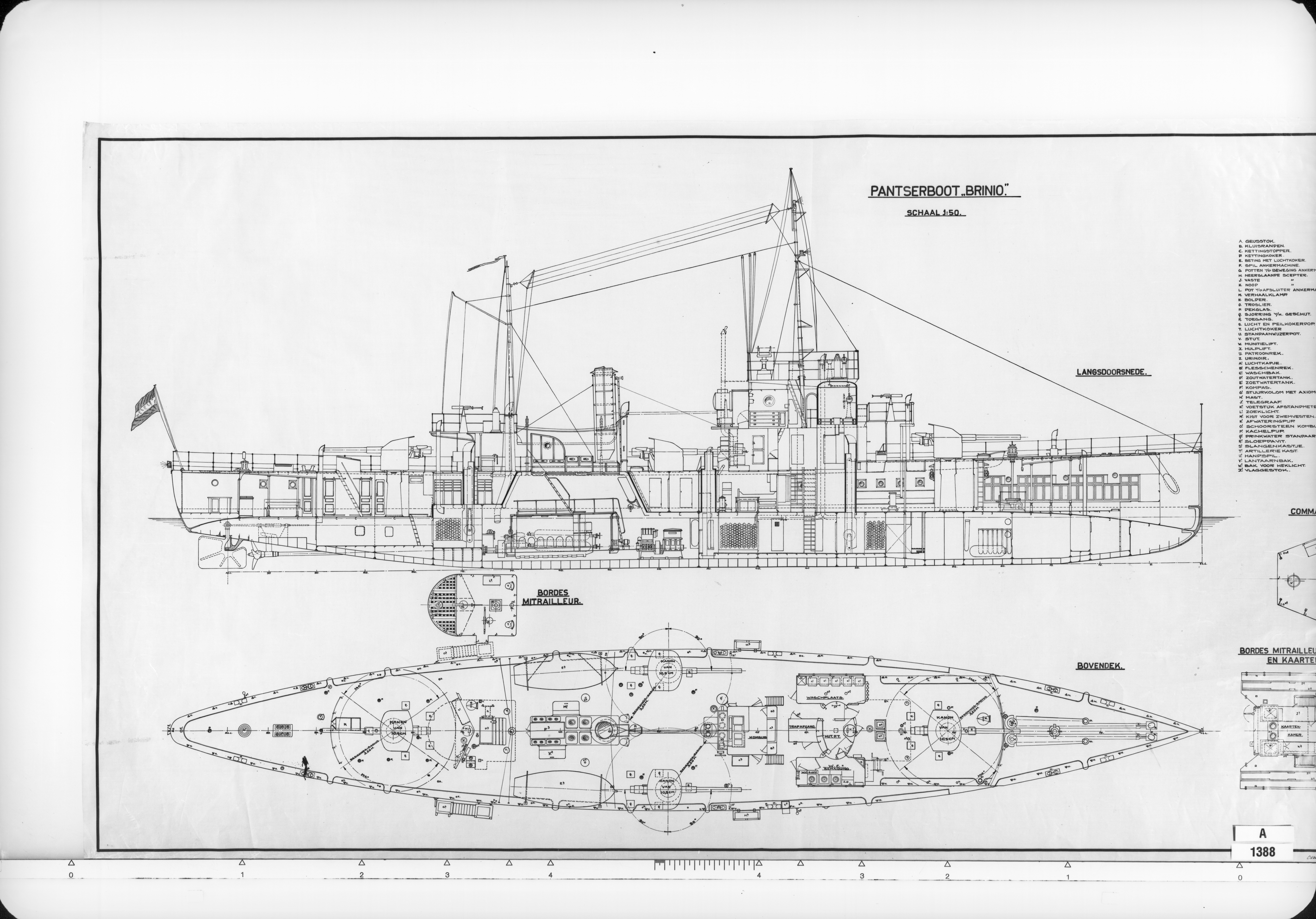
Ship plan

All ships were still in service at the start of World War II. While considered obsolete due to their age and lack of proper anti-aircraft weaponry, these ships could still provide effective firepower for their size due to the large main battery.

Friso was sunk by German bombers on 12 May 1940 on the IJsselmeer and Brinio was scuttled by her own crew on the IJsselmeer on 14 May 1940 after being damaged by a German aircraft.

Gruno escaped to the United Kingdom where she was equipped with depth charges and an asdic type 140A sonar in January of 1941. She continued to serve in the defense of British home waters until May of 1944 when she was laid up and used as an accommodation ship for the remainder of the war in Europe. She then returned to the Netherlands where she served as an accommodation ship once more until sticken in 1950. Gruno was sold for scrap in 1959.

== Boats ==
Brinio class construction data
Name	Laid down	Launched	Commissioned	Decommissioned
Brinio	16 October 1911	12 August 1912	8 September 1914	14 May 1940
Friso	2 November 1911	29 August 1912	12 July 1915	12 May 1940
Gruno	12 February 1912	26 May 1913	15 July 1915	January 1950

== Citations ==
=== Bibliography ===
- Angenent, A.W.P.; Hasselt, F.; J.H.P., Verhoeven (1932). Kent u de marine? (in Dutch). Den Helder: H.J.P. Egner.
- Roberts, John (1980). "The Netherlands". In Chesneau, Roger (ed.). Conway's All the World's Fighting Ships 1922–1946. Conway Maritime Press. pp. 385–396. ISBN 0-85177-146-7.
- de Jong, P.; Cageling, M.A., eds. (1938). Onze strijdmacht ter zee (in Dutch). Rotterdam: M. Wyt & Zonen.
- van Willigenburg, Henk (2010). Dutch Warships of World War II. Emmen: Lanasta. ISBN 978-90-8616-318-2.
- von Münching, L.L. (1978). Schepen van de Koninklijke Marine in de Tweede Wereldoorlog (in Dutch). Alkmaar: De Alk. ISBN 90-6013-903-8.
