= USS Pratt (DE-363) =

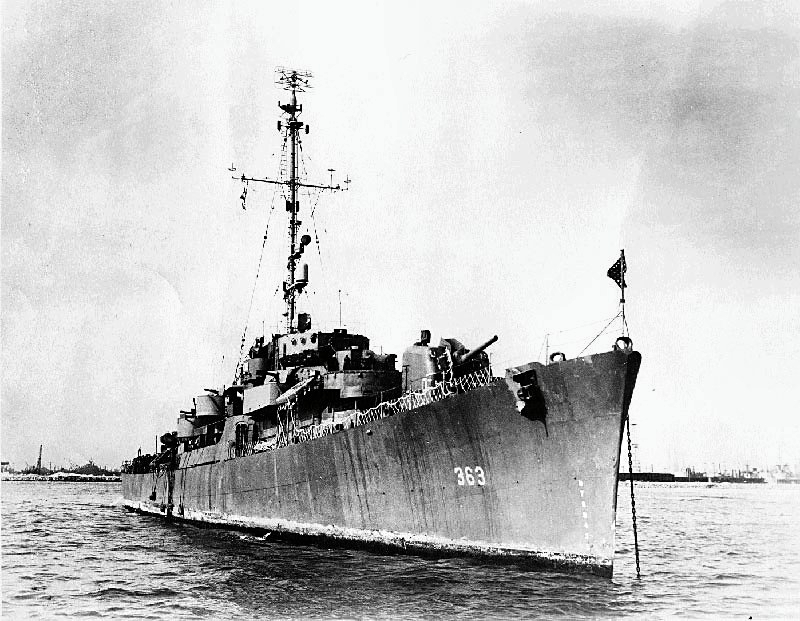
- USS Pratt (DE-363) at anchor, c. 1945

History

United States
- Name: Pratt
- Namesake: Malcolm Lewis Pratt
- Builder: Consolidated Steel Corporation, Orange, Texas
- Laid down: 11 April 1944
- Launched: 1 June 1944
- Commissioned: 18 September 1944
- Decommissioned: 14 May 1946
- Stricken: 15 March 1972
- Fate: Sold for scrap, 15 January 1973

General characteristics
- Class & type: John C. Butler-class destroyer escort
- Displacement: 1,350 long tons (1,372 t)
- Length: 306 ft (93 m)
- Beam: 36 ft 8 in (11.18 m)
- Draft: 9 ft 5 in (2.87 m)
- Propulsion: 2 boilers, 2 geared turbine engines, 12,000 shp (8,900 kW); 2 propellers
- Speed: 24 knots (44 km/h; 28 mph)
- Range: 6,000 nmi (11,000 km; 6,900 mi) at 12 kn (22 km/h; 14 mph)
- Complement: 14 officers, 201 enlisted
- Armament: 2 × single 5 in (127 mm) guns; 2 × twin 40 mm (1.6 in) AA guns; 10 × single 20 mm (0.79 in) AA guns; 1 × triple 21 in (533 mm) torpedo tubes; 8 × depth charge throwers; 1 × Hedgehog ASW mortar; 2 × depth charge racks

USS Pratt (DE-363) was a John C. Butler-class destroyer escort in service with the United States Navy from 1944 to 1946.

== Namesake ==
Malcolm Lewis Pratt was born on 5 August 1891 in Bellefontaine, Ohio. He became Assistant Surgeon with rank of Lieutenant (junior grade), USNRF on 27 March 1917. He received the Navy Cross for extraordinary heroism in reestablishing an advanced aid station just demolished by shell-fire in Lucy-le-Bocage on 11 June 1918, and in continuing to dress and evacuate the wounded under direct and continuous shell-fire at Thiancourt 13 September. He resigned from the Navy on 13 October 1919.

On 2 May 1941 he reported for active duty again with the rank of Lieutenant Commander, MC, USNR. Attached to a Marine Division, he was reported missing in action as of 13 August 1942, when he failed to return from a reconnaissance patrol near the village Mantanikau on Guadalcanal.

== Construction and commissioning ==
Laid down in April 1944, launched in June 1944, and commissioned more than four months later, Pratt served as an escort for convoys between New Guinea and the Philippines during early 1945. She then spent three months training and escorting submarines while also patrolling shipping lanes off the Philippines. After the end of the war in the Pacific, Pratt helped establish seaplane anchorages in Korea and China before being decommissioned in late 1945. She remained in reserve until being sold for scrap in 1973.

== Design ==
The John C. Butler-class destroyer escorts were designed to meet a need for large numbers of cheap anti-submarine escort ships for ocean convoys, and as a result carried little anti-surface armament. The class was part of an initial requirement for 720 escorts to be completed by the end of 1944, which was significantly reduced.

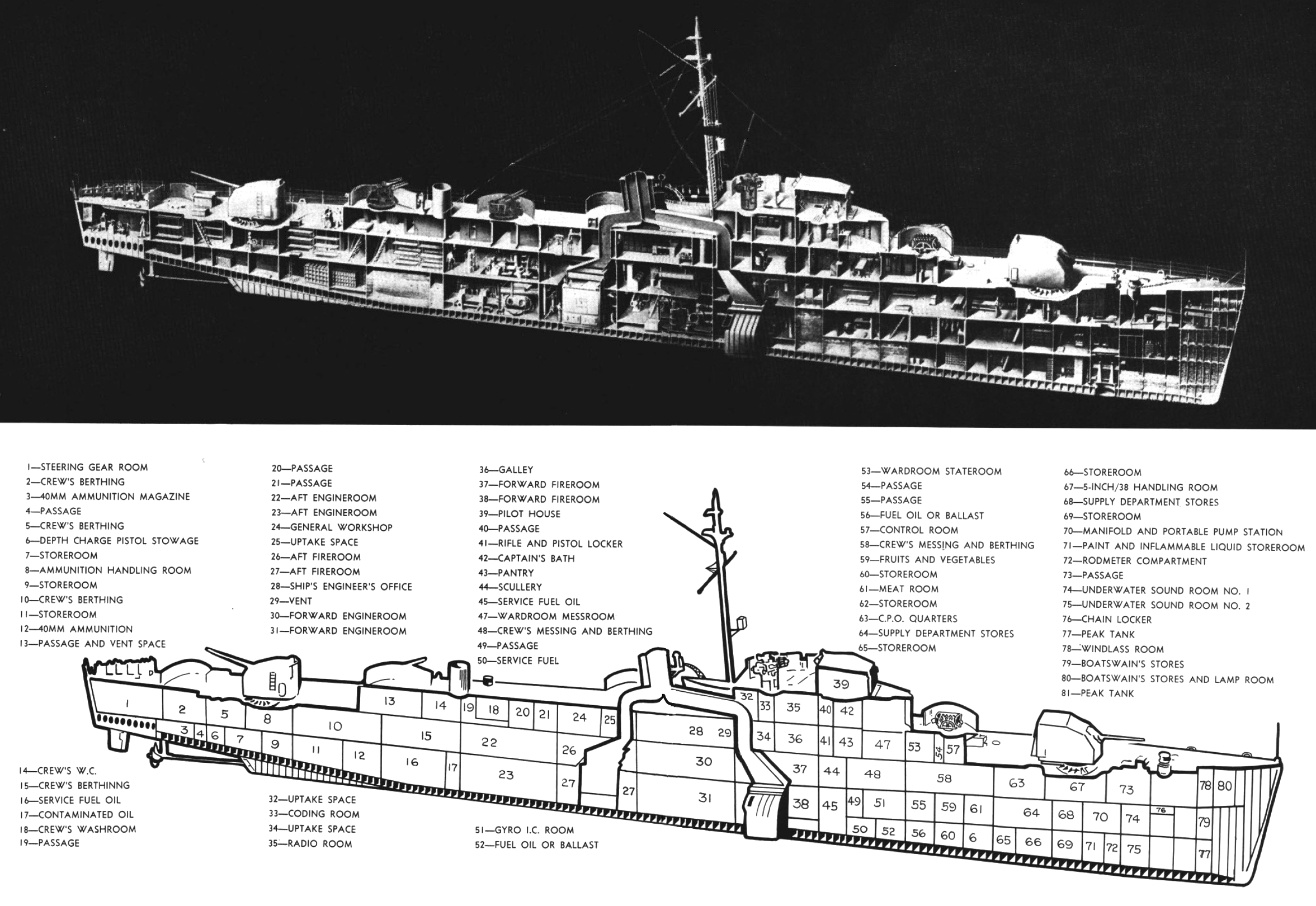
A United States Navy diagram of a destroyer escort

Pratt was 306 feet (93.3 m) long overall with a beam of 36 feet 10 inches (11.2 m) and a draft of 13 feet 4 inches (4.1 m). She displaced 1,350 long tons (1,372 t) standard and 1,745 long tons (1,773 t) full load, with a complement of 14 officers and 201 enlisted men.

The ship was propelled by two Westinghouse geared steam turbines powered by two "D" Express boilers, which created 12,000 shaft horsepower (8,900 kW) for a designed maximum speed of 24 knots (44 km/h; 28 mph). She had a range of 6,000 nautical miles (11,000 km; 6,900 mi) at 12 knots (22 km/h; 14 mph).

=== Armament and sensors ===
Pratt mounted a main battery of two single turret-mounted 5-inch (127 mm) /38 caliber guns, one forward and one aft of the superstructure, to protect against surface and aerial threats, directed by the Mark 51 Gunnery Fire-Control System. In addition, she was armed with six 40-millimeter (1.6 in) Bofors anti-aircraft (AA) guns in two twin mounts, superfiring over the 5-inch guns, also controlled by the Mark 51 fire-control system, and ten single Oerlikon 20-millimeter (0.8 in) light AA guns. Equipped with three 21-inch (533 mm) centerline torpedo tubes, the ship also carried two depth charge racks, eight K-gun depth-charge throwers and one Hedgehog spigot mortar as anti-submarine weapons. She was equipped with a QC series sonar and a SL-1 surface search radar.

== Construction and service ==
Pratt was named for Malcolm Lewis Pratt, a World War I Navy Cross recipient, and his son John Lester Pratt, both of whom were killed in action during the Guadalcanal campaign. The ship's keel was laid down by the Consolidated Steel Corp., Ltd. at their yard in Orange, Texas on 11 April 1944. The destroyer escort was launched on 1 June 1944; sponsored by Mrs. Malcolm L. Pratt, and commissioned 18 September 1944.

=== World War II Pacific Theatre operations ===
After shakedown off Bermuda, Pratt sailed with Escort Division 85 for the Panama Canal and southwest Pacific Ocean. Arriving at Manus, Admiralty Islands on 7 January 1945, Pratt was escort commander for convoys running between New Guinea and the Philippines until 25 May. Between 25 May and 25 August she trained and escorted British and U.S. submarines in the Subic Bay area and patrolled the shipping lanes off the northwestern coast of Luzon.

=== China and Korea operations ===
Pratt next joined TG 70.4 and sailed to Okinawa where she joined the Korean occupation force. On 5 September she sailed for Jinsen and after aiding in establishing a seaplane anchorage there, she got underway with Currituck and Rombach, for Shanghai, China, whence she shifted to Taku, arriving on 28 September to plant seaplane moorings.

=== Post-war decommissioning ===
On 21 November the ship departed the Asian continent for Okinawa, thence to the United States for inactivation. Arriving at San Pedro, Los Angeles on 16 December, she decommissioned on 14 May 1946 and was berthed at Stockton, California as a unit of the Pacific Reserve Fleet. Transferred to the Mare Island Group in 1959, she remained a unit of the Reserve Fleet until she was struck on 15 March 1972. Pratt was sold for scrap on 15 January 1973 and broken up.
