= USS John L. Williamson =

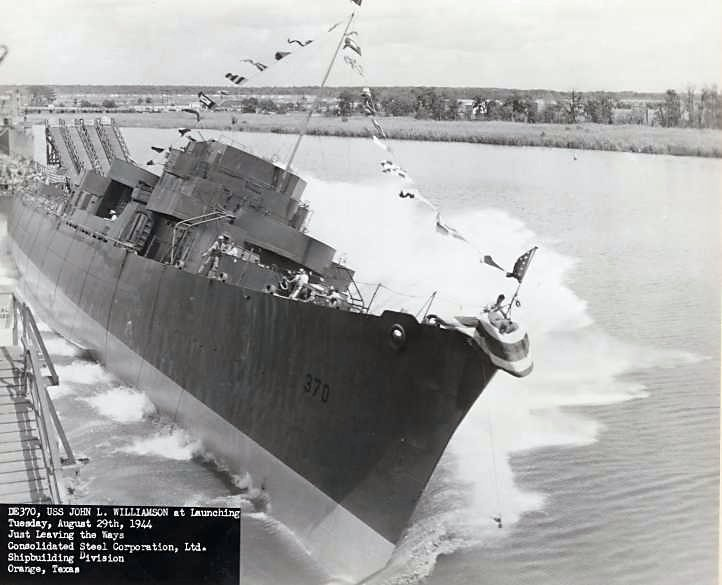
- The ship being launched

History

United States
- Name: John L. Williamson
- Namesake: John Leon Williamson
- Builder: Consolidated Steel Corporation, Orange, Texas
- Laid down: 22 May 1944
- Launched: 29 August 1944
- Commissioned: 31 October 1944
- Decommissioned: 14 June 1946
- Stricken: 15 September 1970
- Fate: Sold for scrapping 13 June 1973

General characteristics
- Class & type: John C. Butler-class destroyer escort
- Displacement: 1,350 long tons (1,372 t)
- Length: 306 ft (93 m)
- Beam: 36 ft 8 in (11.18 m)
- Draft: 9 ft 5 in (2.87 m)
- Propulsion: 2 boilers, 2 geared turbine engines, 12,000 shp (8,900 kW); 2 propellers
- Speed: 24 knots (44 km/h)
- Range: 6,000 nmi (11,000 km) at 12 kn (22 km/h)
- Complement: 14 officers, 201 enlisted
- Armament: 2 × single 5 in (127 mm) guns; 2 × twin 40 mm (1.6 in) AA guns; 10 × single 20 mm (0.79 in) AA guns; 1 × triple 21 in (533 mm) torpedo tubes; 8 × depth charge throwers; 1 × Hedgehog ASW mortar; 2 × depth charge racks

USS John L. Williamson (DE-370) was a John C. Butler-class destroyer escort acquired by the U.S. Navy during World War II. The primary purpose of the destroyer escort was to escort and protect ships in convoy, in addition to other tasks as assigned, such as patrol or radar picket.

== Namesake ==
John Leon Williamson was born 5 November 1921 in Ash, North Carolina. He enlisted in the Navy at Raleigh, North Carolina on 11 July 1940. After recruit training, he was assigned to cruiser USS San Francisco. He was on board the cruiser during the Attack on Pearl Harbor on 7 December 1941 and the initial American amphibious assault of the war on Guadalcanal. He also took part in the American victory at the night Battle of Cape Esperance in October.

On 12 November 1942 one of the many Japanese attempts to bombard American positions on Guadalcanal and to reinforce their own garrisons there resulted in the Naval Battle of Guadalcanal. Before the main engagement, the San Francisco and other ships were attacked by torpedo bombers off Guadalcanal. Williamson was an antiaircraft gunner fired at an approaching torpedo plane, remaining at his station as the aircraft crashed directly into his gun mount. He was posthumously awarded the Navy Cross.

== Construction and commissioning ==
The ship's keel was laid down 22 May 1944 by Consolidated Steel Corp. at their yard in Orange, Texas. The ship was launched on 29 August 1944, sponsored by Mrs. Sherman Register, sister of Seaman First Class Williamson and commissioned on 31 October 1944.

== History ==
=== World War II ===
Following shakedown training in waters off Bermuda, the new escort vessel arrived at Boston, Massachusetts on 21 December 1944. Early in 1945, she received orders to join the U.S. Pacific Fleet and got underway on 3 January to steam via the Panama Canal to San Diego, California. There she arrived on 19 January and moved on to Pearl Harbor on 28 January for training exercises. As Allied amphibious assaults struck ever-closer to Japan, John L. Williamson sailed on 2 March with a convoy for Iwo Jima, arriving on 20 March after a stop at Eniwetok. She took up antisubmarine patrol around the island for four days and anchored again at Eniwetok 28 March 1945.

After serving on a brief antisubmarine patrol off Eniwetok, the ship steamed to Majuro on 5 April and for the next three weeks operated in the Marshall Islands. Air strikes and shore bombardments combined with surrender demands over loudspeakers were used to induce Japanese holdouts to give themselves up. John L. Williamson fired at shore batteries and emplacements at Mill, Alu and other islands, taking off scores of prisoners and natives from these bypassed islands. She sailed from Majuro on 24 April and arrived at Ulithi five days later for picket duty.

John L. Williamson remained on patrol duty around Ulithi with an occasional escort voyage to Eniwetok with troop transports until departing on 15 July with a large convoy for Okinawa. She arrived in Okinawa on 21 July during the final stages of this, the last great island fight of the war, and after two days patrolling off the transport area returned to Ulithi on 27 July. The ship made one more escort voyage to Okinawa in August, and was at anchor at Ulithi when the Japanese accepted surrender terms on 15 August.

The destroyer escort sailed on 22 August for Okinawa and Japan, arriving at Wakayama on 14 September to escort ships through the swept channel and aid in occupation operations. After screening flight operations off Japan, she carried out courier duties between Wakayama and Yokosuka until she sailed for the United States on 2 January 1946.

=== Post-war decommissioning ===
John L. Williamson arrived in San Francisco, California on 22 January 1946 and was decommissioned on 14 June 1946 at San Diego, California. She entered the Pacific Reserve Fleet there and in January 1947 was transferred to Stockton, California. On 15 September 1970, she was struck from the Navy list, and, on 13 June 1973, she was sold for scrapping.

== See also ==
- USS Williamson (DD-244)
