= USS Joseph E. Connolly =

History

United States
- Laid down: 6 April 1944
- Launched: 6 August 1944
- Commissioned: 28 February 1945
- Decommissioned: 20 June 1946
- Stricken: 1 June 1970
- Fate: Sunk as target 24 February 1972

General characteristics
- Displacement: 1,350 long tons (1,372 t)
- Length: 306 ft (93 m) (oa)
- Beam: 36 ft 10 in (11.23 m)
- Draught: 13 ft 4 in (4.06 m) (max)
- Propulsion: 2 boilers, 2 geared steam turbines, 12,000 shp, 2 screws
- Speed: 24 knots
- Range: 6,000 nm @ 12 knots
- Complement: 14 officers, 201 enlisted
- Armament: 2-5 in (130 mm), 4 (2×2) 40 mmAA, 10-20 mm AA, 3-21-inch (533 mm) TT, 1 Hedgehog, 8 DCT's, 2 DC tracks

USS Joseph E. Connolly (DE-450) was a John C. Butler-class destroyer escort acquired by the U.S. Navy during World War II. The primary purpose of the destroyer escort was to escort and protect ships in convoy, in addition to other tasks as assigned, such as patrol or radar picket. Post-war she returned home with one battle star to her credit.

Joseph E. Connolly (DE-450) was named in honor of Joseph Edward Connolly who was killed in the Guadalcanal campaign and was awarded the Navy Cross.

== Namesake ==
Joseph Edward Connolly was born on 1 June 1904 in New York City. He served in the United States Navy from 1927 to 1930 before enlisting in the United States Marine Corps on 9 March 1936. He attained the grade of Corporal by 1942 and took part in the assault on Guadalcanal, first American amphibious operation of the war.

On 9 October 1942 Connolly and his men bore the brunt of a heavy Japanese assault along the Matanikau River. He was posthumously awarded the Navy Cross.

== Construction and commissioning ==
She was laid down 6 April 1944 by Federal Shipbuilding & Dry Dock Co., Newark, New Jersey; launched 6 August 1944; sponsored by Miss Cecilia C. Connolly, sister of Corporal Connolly; and commissioned 28 February 1945.

== World War II Pacific Theatre operations ==
Following shakedown training in the Caribbean Joseph E. Connolly departed Norfolk, Virginia, 10 May 1945 for assignment to the Pacific Fleet. She transited the Panama Canal and steamed by way of San Diego, California, to Pearl Harbor, where she arrived 6 June for additional intensive training. The ship then steamed to Eniwetok in early July to act as an escort ship during the final days of the Pacific war. Joseph E. Connolly served as screen ship to logistic-support units of the U.S. 3rd Fleet during the final strikes on the Japanese mainland.

== End-of-war operations ==
The escort vessel returned to Ulithi after war's end, arriving 31 August, and joined the screening unit for logistic support ships. She arrived Tokyo Bay 13 September and steamed to Jinsen, Korea, 22 September to assist in the occupation of Korea and North China, then the subject of critical contention between Communist and Nationalist factions in China. Joseph E. Connolly spent 27 to 31 October at Shanghai in support of the U.S. Marines ashore, after which she joined a service squadron in supplying fuel and supplies to various Pacific island bases.

== Post-war decommissioning ==
After patrol off Saipan in December, the ship sailed for the United States 4 January 1946, arriving Boston, Massachusetts, 17 February via San Diego and the Panama Canal Zone. She later steamed to Green Cove Springs, Florida, where she decommissioned 20 June 1946 and entered the Reserve Fleet. Joseph E. Connolly was struck from the Navy list on 1 June 1970 and, on 24 February 1972, she was sunk as a target.

== Military awards ==
Joseph E. Connolly received one battle star for World War II service.
