= USS Bivin =

John C. Butler-class destroyer escort of the United States Navy

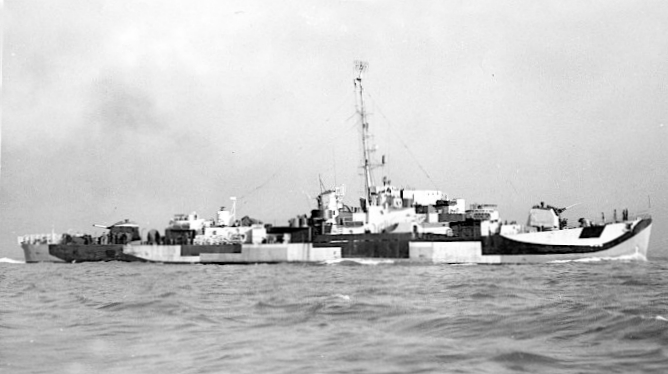

History

United States
- Laid down: 3 November 1943
- Launched: 7 December 1943
- Commissioned: 31 October 1944
- Decommissioned: 15 January 1947
- Stricken: 30 June 1968
- Fate: Sunk as target off California on 17 July 1969

General characteristics
- Displacement: 1,350 long tons (1,372 t)
- Length: 306 ft (93 m) (oa)
- Beam: 36 ft 10 in (11.23 m)
- Draft: 13 ft 4 in (4.06 m) (max)
- Propulsion: 2 boilers, 2 geared steam turbines, 12,000 shp, 2 screws
- Speed: 24 knots
- Range: 6,000 nmi at 12 knots
- Complement: 14 officers, 201 enlisted
- Armament: 2-5 in (130 mm), 4 (2×2) 40 mmAA, 10-20 mm AA, 3-21-inch (533 mm) TT, 1 Hedgehog, 8 DCT's, 2 DC tracks

USS Bivin (DE-536) was a John C. Butler-class destroyer escort in service with the United States Navy from 1944 to 1947. She was finally sunk as a target in 1969.

== History ==
Bivin was named after Vernard Eugene Bivin who was killed during the Battle of Cape Esperance and awarded the Navy Cross posthumously for his brave actions. USS Bivin (DE-536) was launched 7 December 1943 by Boston Navy Yard; sponsored by Mrs. Ella Florence Bivin, mother of Seaman Bivin; and commissioned 31 October 1944.

Assigned to the U.S. Pacific Fleet, Bivin departed Boston, Massachusetts, 1 February 1945 and arrived at Seeadler Harbor, Manus, Admiralty Islands, 20 March. After escorting a convoy from Kossol Roads, Palau Islands, to Leyte during late March and early April, she patrolled and escorted convoys in the Philippines. Between late August and early November she escorted convoys from the Philippines to Okinawa, patrolled in the Philippines, and made a trip to Hong Kong.

Returning to San Pedro, California, 17 December 1945 she reported to the 19th Fleet. On 15 January 1947 she went out of commission in reserve. On 30 June 1968 she was struck from the Navy list, and, on 17 July 1969, sunk as target off California.
