= USS Edwin A. Howard =

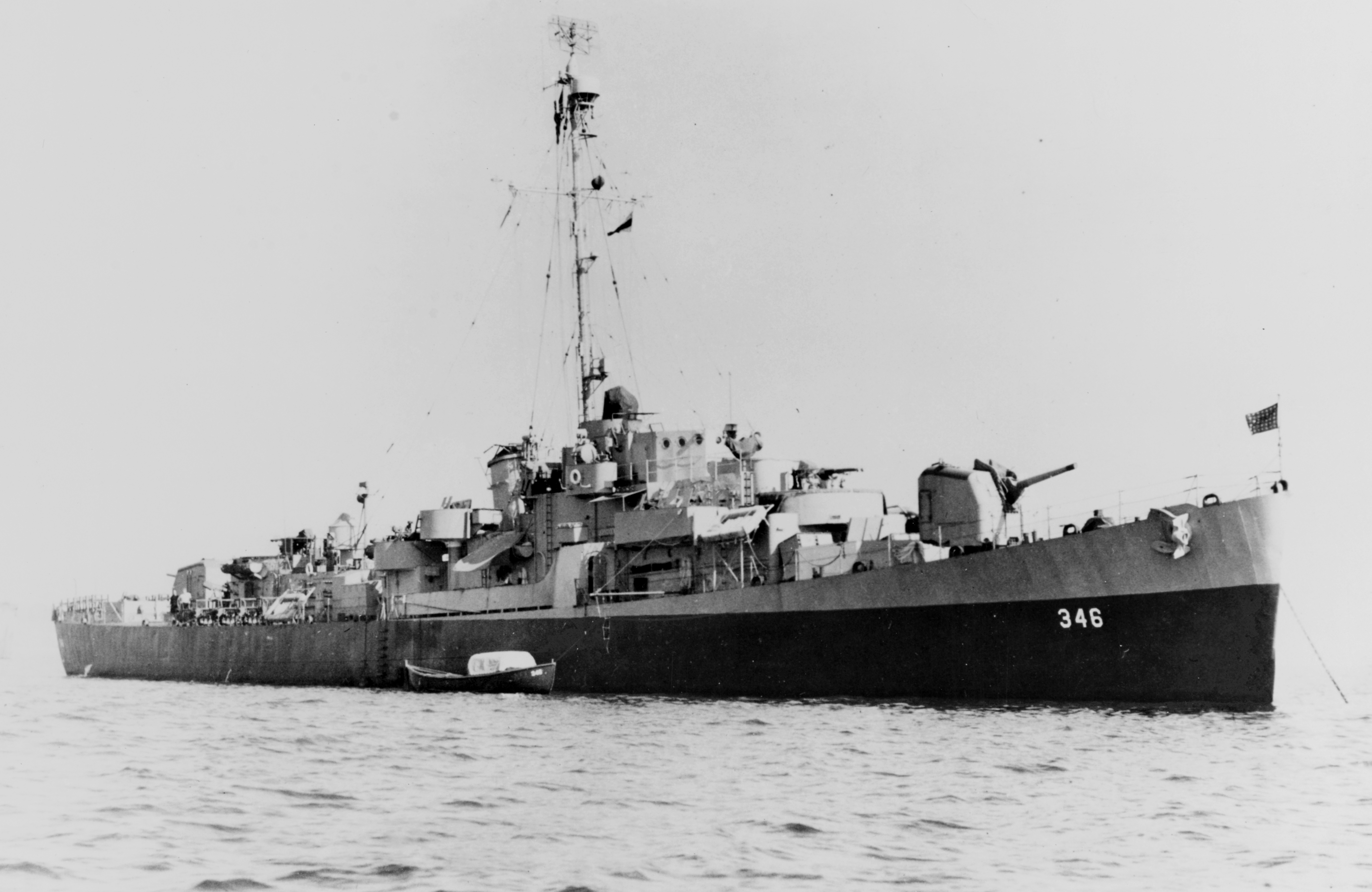
- USS Edwin A. Howard at anchor c. 1945

History

United States
- Name: Edwin A. Howard
- Namesake: Edwin Alfred Howard
- Builder: Consolidated Steel Corporation, Orange, Texas
- Laid down: 15 November 1943
- Launched: 25 January 1944
- Commissioned: 25 May 1944
- Decommissioned: 25 September 1946
- Stricken: 1 December 1972
- Identification: DE-346
- Honours and awards: 1 battle star for World War II
- Fate: Sold for scrapping 12 September 1973

General characteristics
- Class & type: John C. Butler-class destroyer escort
- Displacement: 1,350 long tons (1,372 t)
- Length: 306 ft (93 m)
- Beam: 36 ft 8 in (11.18 m)
- Draft: 9 ft 5 in (2.87 m)
- Propulsion: 2 boilers, 2 geared turbine engines, 12,000 shp (8,900 kW); 2 propellers
- Speed: 24 knots (44 km/h; 28 mph)
- Range: 6,000 nmi (11,000 km; 6,900 mi) at 12 kn (22 km/h; 14 mph)
- Complement: 14 officers, 201 enlisted
- Armament: 2 × single 5 in (127 mm) guns; 2 × twin 40 mm (1.6 in) AA guns; 10 × single 20 mm (0.79 in) AA guns; 1 × triple 21 in (533 mm) torpedo tubes; 8 × depth charge throwers; 1 × Hedgehog ASW mortar; 2 × depth charge racks

USS Edwin A. Howard (DE-346) was a John C. Butler-class destroyer escort acquired by the United States Navy during World War II. The primary purpose of the destroyer escort was to escort and protect ships in convoy, in addition to other tasks as assigned, such as patrol or radar picket. Post-war, she returned home with one battle star to her credit.

== Namesake ==
Edwin Alfred Howard was born on 6 July 1922 in Phoenix, Arizona. He enlisted in the U.S. Marine Corps on 23 September 1941. On 3 November 1942 at Guadalcanal, Corporal Howard was in charge of a communication wire team trying to reestablish vital lines to the rear under enemy fire when he was killed trying to move a wounded comrade to safety. He was posthumously awarded the Silver Star.

== Construction and commissioning ==
Edwin A. Howard (DE-346) was launched 25 January 1944 by Consolidated Steel Corp., Ltd., Orange, Texas; sponsored by Mrs. Julia W. Howard, mother of Corporal Howard; and commissioned 25 May 1944.

== Operational history ==
=== Pacific Theatre operations ===
After one convoy escort voyage to the Mediterranean in September and October 1944, Edwin A. Howard sailed from New York 10 November for the South Pacific. From Hollandia she shepherded a convoy to San Pedro Bay, Leyte, arriving 6 January 1945. Edward A. Howard reinforced Destroyer Squadron 49 on antisubmarine patrol in Leyte Gulf. She took a convoy through from the Palaus to San Pedro Bay, and continued escort service between New Guinea and Leyte.

=== Supporting Leyte landings ===
Edwin A. Howard arrived in Polloc Harbor 30 April 1945, and for the next month escorted convoys to supply troops ashore around Davao Gulf, on the second such voyage bombarding targets on Samal Island in the gulf, and other points on the shore. On 10 June she sailed from San Pedro Bay with a convoy of landing craft bound for Morotai, from which the destroyer escort returned to Tawi Tawi escorting an ammunition ship. She left Tawi Tawi 26 June to escort a squadron of motor torpedo boats and their tender to Balikpapan, arriving 27 June, four days before the invasion. Edwin A. Howard screened minesweepers operating off the coast, and covered the landings, then escorted reinforcements from Morotai to the beachheads before returning to Leyte on 26 July.

The escort vessel remained in the Far East on occupation duty, escorting convoys from Leyte to Ulithi, Okinawa, and Japan.

=== Post-war decommissioning ===
She sailed from Samar 28 November 1945 for the United States and was placed out of commission in reserve 25 September 1946.

== Awards ==
Edwin A. Howard received one battle star for World War II service.
