= USS George E. Davis =

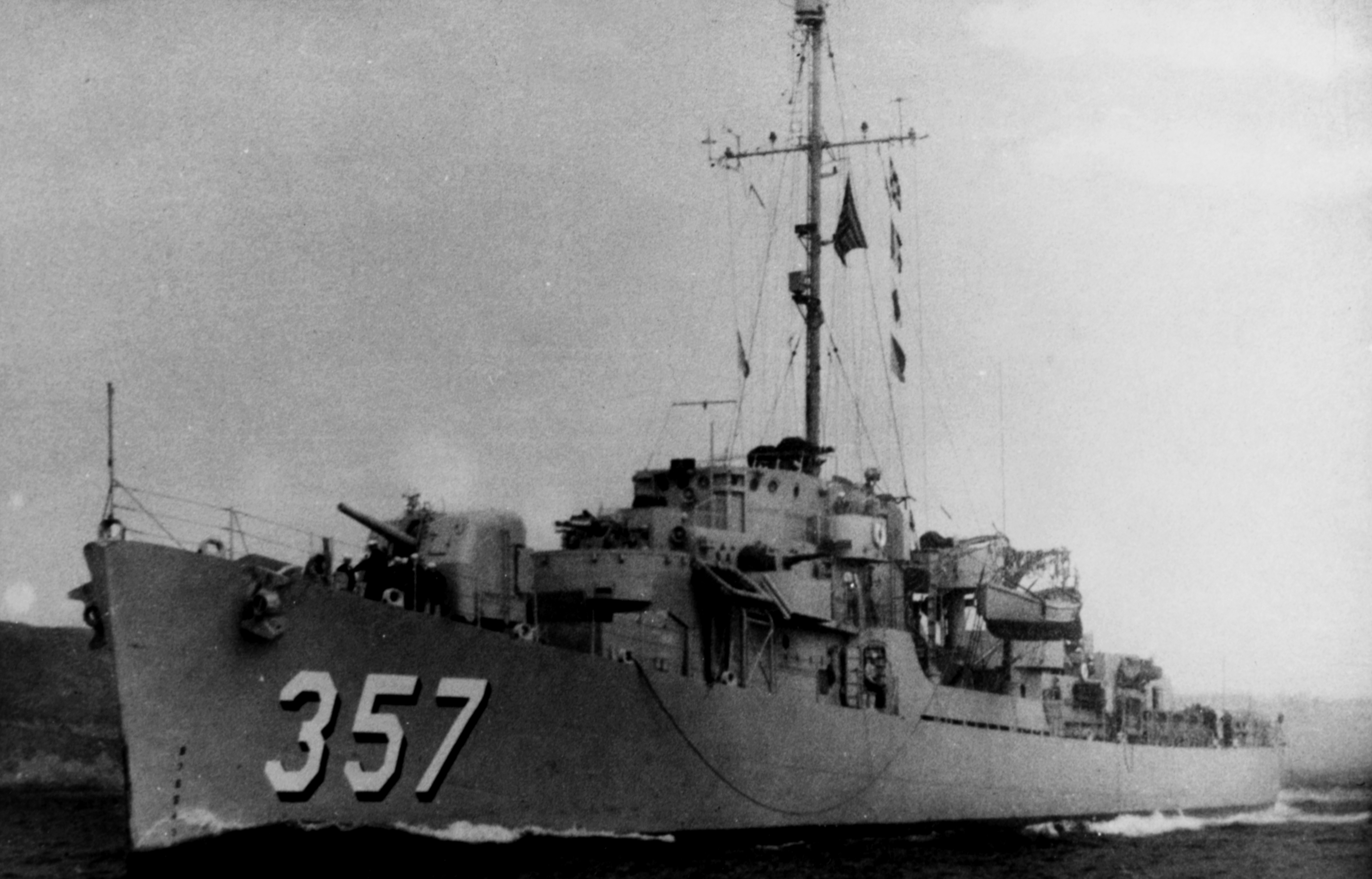
- USS George E. Davis (DE-357) c. the early 1950s

History

United States
- Name: George E. Davis
- Namesake: George Elliot Davis, Jr.
- Builder: Consolidated Steel Corporation, Orange, Texas
- Laid down: 15 February 1944
- Launched: 8 April 1944
- Commissioned: 11 August 1944
- Decommissioned: 26 August 1946
- Commissioned: 11 July 1951
- Decommissioned: 11 November 1954
- Stricken: 1 December 1972
- Fate: Sold for scrap 2 January 1974

General characteristics
- Class & type: John C. Butler-class destroyer escort
- Displacement: 1,350 long tons (1,372 t)
- Length: 306 ft (93 m)
- Beam: 36 ft 8 in (11.18 m)
- Draft: 9 ft 5 in (2.87 m)
- Propulsion: 2 boilers, 2 geared turbine engines, 12,000 shp (8,900 kW); 2 propellers
- Speed: 24 knots (44 km/h; 28 mph)
- Range: 6,000 nmi (11,000 km; 6,900 mi) at 12 kn (22 km/h; 14 mph)
- Complement: 14 officers, 201 enlisted
- Armament: 2 × single 5 in (127 mm) guns; 2 × twin 40 mm (1.6 in) AA guns; 10 × single 20 mm (0.79 in) AA guns; 1 × triple 21 in (533 mm) torpedo tubes; 8 × depth charge throwers; 1 × Hedgehog ASW mortar; 2 × depth charge racks

USS George E. Davis (DE-357) was a John C. Butler-class destroyer escort acquired by the U.S. Navy during World War II. The primary purpose of the destroyer escort was to escort and protect ships in convoy, in addition to other tasks as assigned, such as patrol or radar picket.

The ship was named in honor of Lt. George Elliot Davis, Jr., who was killed in action by enemy aircraft near Madoera Strait, Borneo. The destroyer escort's keel was laid down on 15 February 1944 by the Consolidated Steel Corp. at their yard in Orange, Texas. George E. Davis was launched on 8 April 1944; sponsored by Mrs. George E. Davis, Jr., his widow. The ship was commissioned on 11 August 1944.

== Operational history ==
=== Pacific Theatre operations ===
After shakedown off Bermuda, George E. Davis departed Norfolk, Virginia, for the Pacific Ocean on 21 October 1944 and arrived Hollandia, New Guinea on 28 November. As a convoy escort, she sailed on 7 December for the Philippines where she arrived San Pedro Bay, Leyte on 12 December. Assigned to the Philippine Sea Frontier, during the remaining months of fighting in the Pacific she served in the Southwest Pacific on convoy escort and antisubmarine patrols.

=== Supporting Philippine operations ===
Until March 1945 George E. Davis operated out of San Pedro Bay, Leyte, escorting troop and supply convoys to and from New Guinea, the Admiralty Islands, and the Palaus. On 23 March she departed Leyte for the western Philippines; and, steaming via Mindoro, she arrived Subic Bay, Luzon on 30 March. During the next two months she patrolled the convoy lanes west of Mindoro and Luzon, sweeping the South China Sea in search of Japanese submarines. Between 3 and 7 June she steamed from Subic Bay to Ulithi, Western Carolines, returning to Subic Bay on 12 June as escort for a convoy. Departing 16 June, she returned to Ulithi on 20 June; and between 27 and 30 June, she escorted a supply convoy to Leyte Gulf.

=== End-of-war activity ===
During July George E. Davis escorted convoys between the Philippines and Okinawa. After the Japanese capitulation 15 August, she continued escort and patrol duties in the Philippines and in the East China Sea. In September she guarded convoys carrying occupation troops from the Philippines to Japan. Early in December she sailed from the Philippines to the coast of China where she supported American and Chinese Nationalist troops during reoccupation operations along the coast of northern China. During January and February 1946 she operated along the coast of Japan before returning to Qingdao, China on 20 February. She patrolled the East China Sea and Yellow Sea off mainland China until 16 April when she departed for the United States. She arrived at San Pedro, California on 11 May and decommissioned at San Diego, California on 26 August. The warship entered the Pacific Reserve Fleet.

=== Recommissioned as a training ship ===
George E. Davis recommissioned at San Diego on 11 July 1951, and departed San Diego on 11 October. She steamed via the Panama Canal to the U.S. East Coast, where she arrived at Newport, Rhode Island on 27 October. Assigned to the Atlantic Fleet, during the next three years she operated out of Newport as a training ship for the U.S. Naval Reserves. This duty carried her along the eastern seaboard and in the Caribbean and she continued this service until June 1954.

=== Final decommissioning ===
She decommissioned on 11 November 1954 at Green Cove Springs, Florida, and entered the Atlantic Reserve Fleet. On 1 December 1972 she was struck from the Navy list and, on 2 January 1974, she was sold for scrap.
