= USS Chester T. O'Brien =

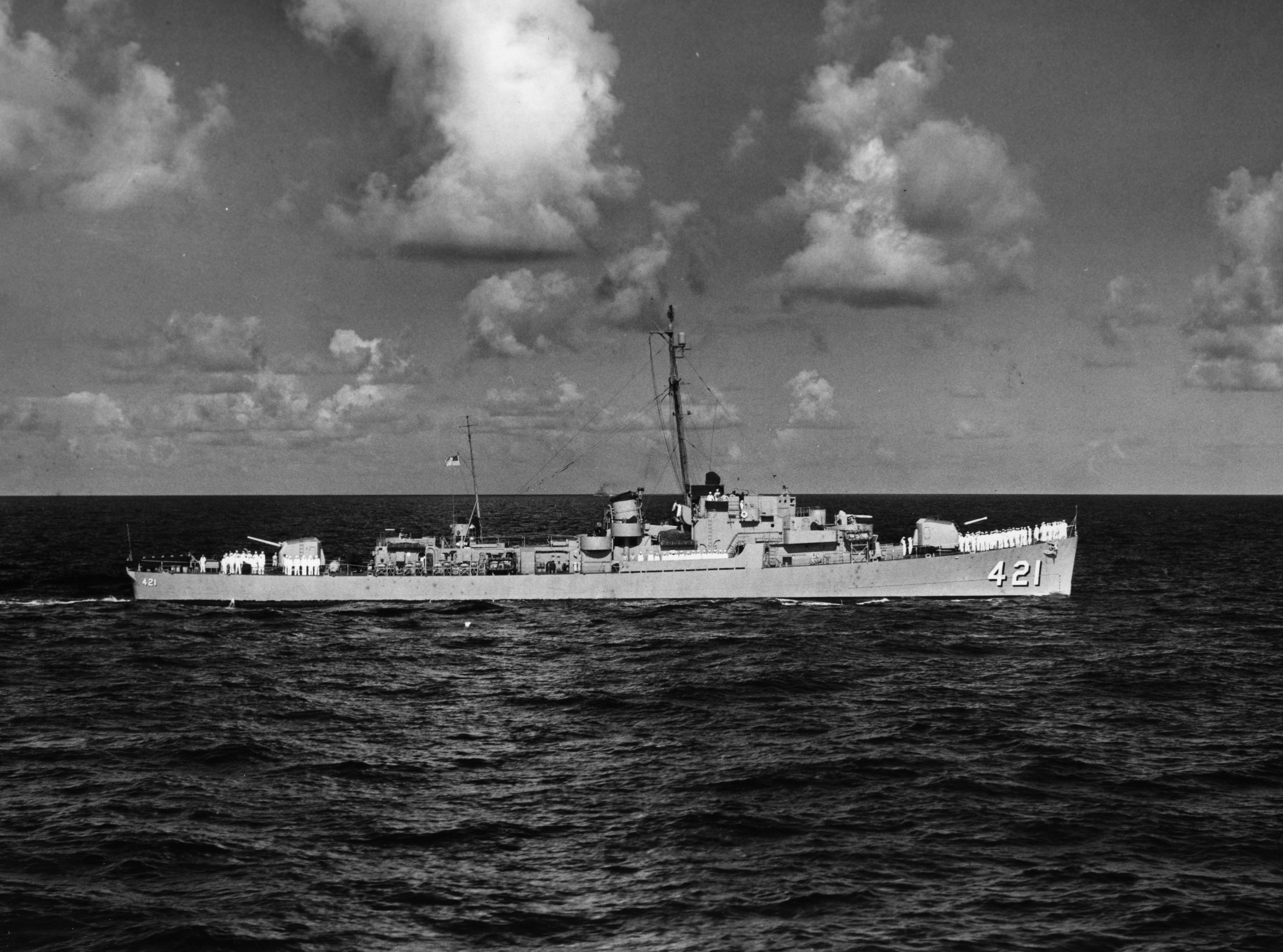

History

United States
- Name: Chester T. O'Brien
- Laid down: 21 January 1944
- Launched: 29 February 1944
- Commissioned: 3 July 1944
- Decommissioned: 2 July 1946
- In service: 28 March 1951
- Out of service: 25 May 1960
- Stricken: 1 July 1972
- Fate: Sold for scrapping 4 April 1974

General characteristics
- Class & type: John C. Butler-class destroyer escort
- Displacement: 1,350 long tons (1,372 t)
- Length: 306 ft (93 m) (oa)
- Beam: 36 ft 10 in (11.23 m)
- Draft: 13 ft 4 in (4.06 m) (max)
- Propulsion: 2 boilers, 2 geared steam turbines, 12,000 shp (8,900 kW), 2 screws
- Speed: 24 knots (44 km/h)
- Range: 6,000 nautical miles (11,000 km) at 12 knots (22 km/h)
- Complement: 14 officers, 201 enlisted
- Armament: 2 × single 5 in (127 mm) guns; 2 × twin 40 mm (1.6 in) AA guns; 10 × single 20 mm (0.79 in) AA guns; 1 × triple 21 in (533 mm) torpedo tubes; 8 × depth charge throwers; 1 × Hedgehog ASW mortar; 2 × depth charge racks

USS Chester T. O’Brien (DE-421) was a John C. Butler-class destroyer escort in service with the United States Navy from 1944 to 1946 and from 1951 to 1960. She was scrapped in 1974.

== Namesake ==
Chester Thomas O'Brien was born on 1 August 1897 at Lyons, New York. He enlisted in the United States Marine Corps on 24 July 1917. He served at Parris Island, aboard USS Connecticut, at Quantico, Santo Domingo, Guam and China. Platoon Sergeant O'Brien was killed in action on Guadalcanal on 24 January 1943. He was posthumously awarded the Silver Star.

== History ==
Chester T. O'Brien was launched on 29 February 1944 by Brown Shipbuilding Co., Houston, Texas, sponsored by Mrs. J. Edington, sister of Platoon Sergeant O'Brien, commissioned on 3 July 1944 and reported to the Atlantic Fleet.

=== World War II ===
Chester T. O'Brien interrupted her shakedown training to escort the Italian submarine Goffredo Mameli to Portsmouth on 24 August 1944. She escorted a convoy to Naples, Italy.

Chester T. O'Brien sailed from New York 10 November for convoy escort duty between Leyte and Manus, to Palau, and throughout the Philippines until 20 April 1945. The escort sailed from Hollandia 14 May to protect the landing of reinforcements of Davao Gulf, and to bombard St. Augustine Point. At Polloc Harbor off Moro Gulf in southern Mindanao, she became administrative control ship for amphibious forces, 20 May, and sailed to Zamboanga, 12 June, to coordinate amphibious shipping in training exercises. On 20 July she landed troops on Balut, the island controlling the Saragani Straits.

From 11 August 1945 Chester T. O'Brien had convoy escort duty in the Philippines and participated in redeployment of forces in the Far East until 25 November, when she sailed with homeward bound troops for San Pedro, California, arriving 17 December 1945. Chester T. O'Brien was decommissioned 2 July 1946 at San Diego, California, and placed in reserve.

=== Training duty ===
Chester T. O'Brien was recommissioned 28 March 1951, departed San Diego 22 June for Newport, Rhode Island, and arrived at her new homeport 11 July. After a period of training, overhaul, and exercises, she served as school ship for the Fleet Sonar School at Key West, Florida (30 June-18 October 1952). Participation in Operation Springboard (5–30 January 1953) preceded another assignment with the Fleet Sonar School (30 March – 23 June), and on 8 July Chester T. O'Brien departed Newport for a midshipman cruise to ports of northern Europe (Bergen, Norway and Copenhagen, Denmark) and Guantanamo Bay, Cuba, returning to Narragansett Bay 5 September. Overhaul, training, and antisubmarine exercises were her employment until 19 July 1954, when she sailed again on a midshipmen cruise to Quebec and Cuba, returning 21 August.

Between 20 September 1954 and 25 April 1958, Chester T. O'Brien served as school ship with the Fleet Sonar School and with the Escort Vessel Gunnery School of Destroyer Force, Atlantic, and conducted local operations at Newport and Key West. Operations out of New York, Norfolk, and Narragansett Bay continued until 5 September 1958 when she reported for duty as a Reserve training ship at New York.

== Fate ==
Decommissioned 21 February 1959, she continued her training duty until 25 May 1960, when she was placed in reserve at Bayonne, New Jersey. On 1 July 1972 she was struck from the Navy list and, on 4 April 1974, she was sold for scrapping.
