= USS Maurice J. Manuel =

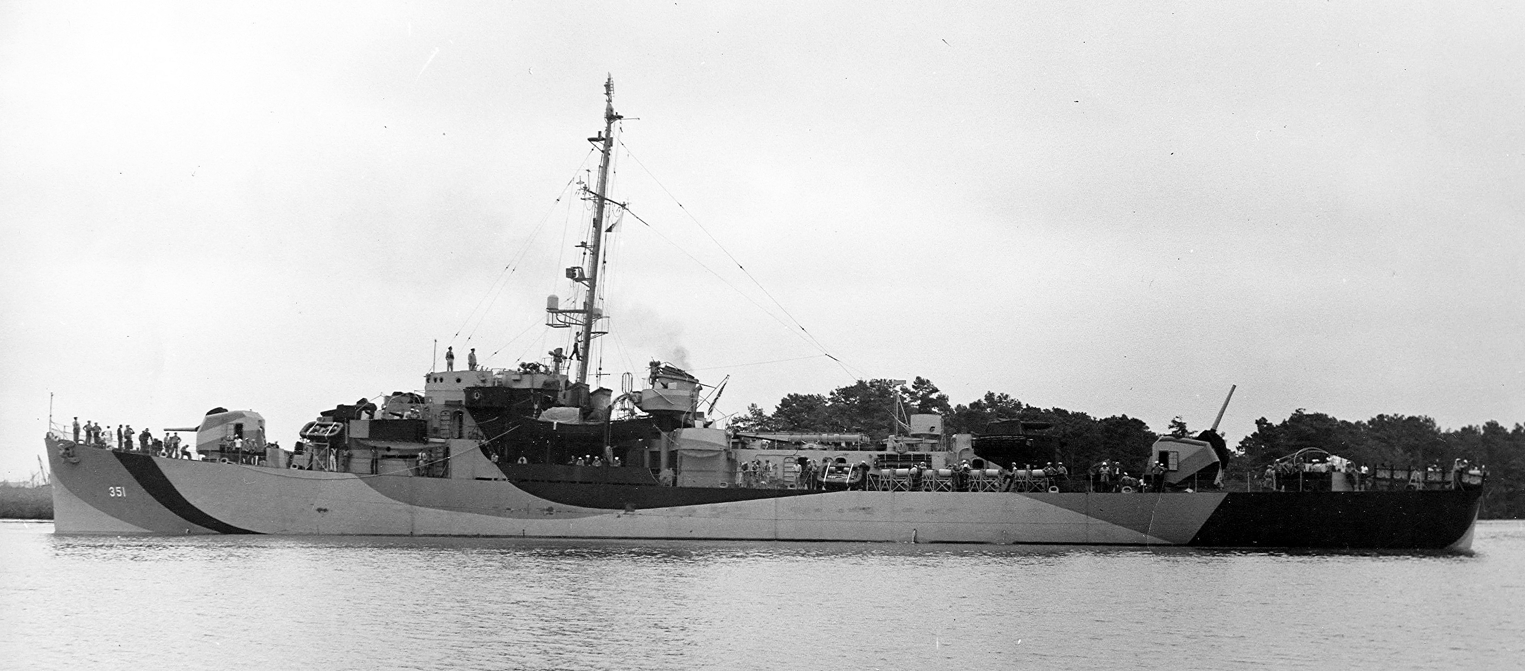
- Maurice J. Manuel, likely at Houston just after commissioning, c. 30 June 1944

History

United States
- Name: Maurice J. Manuel
- Namesake: Maurice Joseph Manuel
- Builder: Consolidated Steel Corporation, Orange, Texas
- Laid down: 22 December 1943
- Launched: 19 February 1944
- Commissioned: 30 June 1944 to 20 May 1946; 27 April 1951 to 30 October 1957
- Stricken: 1 May 1966
- Fate: Sunk as target August 1966

General characteristics
- Class & type: John C. Butler-class destroyer escort
- Displacement: 1,350 long tons (1,372 t)
- Length: 306 ft (93 m)
- Beam: 36 ft 8 in (11.18 m)
- Draft: 9 ft 5 in (2.87 m)
- Propulsion: 2 boilers, 2 geared turbine engines, 12,000 shp (8,900 kW); 2 propellers
- Speed: 24 knots (44 km/h; 28 mph)
- Range: 6,000 nmi (11,000 km; 6,900 mi) at 12 kn (22 km/h; 14 mph)
- Complement: 14 officers, 201 enlisted
- Armament: 2 × single 5 in (127 mm) guns; 2 × twin 40 mm (1.6 in) AA guns; 10 × single 20 mm (0.79 in) AA guns; 1 × triple 21 in (533 mm) torpedo tubes; 8 × depth charge throwers; 1 × Hedgehog ASW mortar; 2 × depth charge racks

USS Maurice J. Manuel (DE-351) was a John C. Butler-class destroyer escort acquired by the U.S. Navy during World War II. The primary purpose of the destroyer escort was to escort and protect ships in convoy, in addition to other tasks as assigned, such as patrol or radar picket.

== Namesake ==
Maurice Joseph Manuel was born on 29 April 1917 at Mamou, Louisiana. He enlisted in the United States Marine Corps at New Orleans, Louisiana on 16 December 1941. During the early months of World War II he served at San Diego, California, where he was promoted to private first class on 4 April 1942.

He participated in the invasion of the Solomon Islands in August and for more than 3 months took part in the defense of American positions on Guadalcanal. On 10 November 1942 while fighting between the Matanikau River and Poha River, he voluntarily left a protected position to rescue wounded comrades. Despite intense Japanese machine gun fire, he crossed a grassy knoll and carried one seriously injured companion to safety. While making a second rescue attempt, he was struck by enemy gunfire. He was posthumously awarded the Silver Star.

== Construction and commissioning ==
The destroyer escort's keel was laid down by Consolidated Steel Corp. at their yard in Orange, Texas on 22 December 1943. Maurice J. Manuel was launched on 19 February 1944, sponsored by Mrs. Leona Manuel. The vessel was commissioned at Orange on 30 June 1944.

== Operational history ==
=== World War II North Atlantic operations ===
After shakedown off Bermuda, Maurice J. Manuel served as a training ship out of Norfolk, Virginia, until steaming to New York City for convoy escort duty on 3 October. Sailing in convoy on 6 October, she battled heavy weather in the Atlantic and Mediterranean and safely escorted the first American convoy to Marseilles, France on 20 October. After returning to the United States on 7 November, between 25 November and 24 December, she escorted another convoy to southern France, steamed to the coast of North Africa, and returned to New York.

=== Transferred to the Pacific Fleet ===
On 16 January 1945 Maurice J. Manuel sailed for duty in the Pacific She escorted the attack transport USS Caswell to the Panama Canal Zone; thence, as part of Escort Division 78, she steamed to the Admiralties, arriving at Manus on 19 February. Assigned to Task Force (TF) 75, she began convoy escort duty to the Philippine Islands on 3 March and arrived in Leyte Gulf on 8 March. She sailed for Melanesia on 13 March, reaching Hollandia, New Guinea on 19 March, and between 21 and 28 March again returned to Leyte.

=== Convoy duty in the Pacific ===
Maurice J. Manuel maintained her busy pace. Convoy runs sent her between Leyte and New Guinea, the Palaus, and Ulithi, as well as among the Philippines to Manila Bay, Subic Bay, and Lingayen Gulf. Late in July the destroyer escort made a run to Okinawa out of Subic Bay; and as the war ended 15 August, she patrolled the coast of Luzon out of Lingayen Gulf. On 26 August Maurice J. Manuel departed Manila Bay for Tokyo Bay, Japan, escorting SS Winthrop Victory and USS General S. D. Sturgis. The latter ship carried high-ranking military and naval officers from the United States, Australia, Canada, China, and the Netherlands East Indies to Japanese surrender ceremonies on board the battleship Missouri. The convoy entered Tokyo Bay 31 August; thence, Maurice J. Manuel sailed on 1 September via Okinawa to Leyte Gulf where the ship arrived 8 September.

=== End-of-war activity ===
For more than two months the escort ship conducted periodic patrols east of the Philippines out of San Pedro Bay. Departing the Philippines on 27 November, she steamed via Eniwetok and Pearl Harbor to the U.S. West Coast, arriving at Long Beach, California on 17 December and sailing to San Diego, California on 15 March 1946. Maurice J. Manuel decommissioned there on 20 May 1946 and entered the Pacific Reserve Fleet.

=== Recommissioned as a training ship ===
Maurice J. Manuel recommissioned at San Diego on 27 April 1951. After shakedown, she proceeded to the east coast for duty with the Atlantic Fleet, arriving Newport, Rhode Island, 11 August. During the next several months she participated in type-training and squadron exercises along the Atlantic coast, in the Caribbean, and in the Gulf of Mexico. From July to September 1952 she served as training ship for the Fleet Sonar School at Key West, Florida. She continued a busy pattern of training and readiness operations between New England waters and the Caribbean during next nine months; thence, she departed Newport on 16 July 1953 for deployment to northern Europe. With midshipmen embarked, she cruised the North Atlantic, the North Sea, and the Baltic Sea, visiting Bergen, Norway, and Copenhagen, Denmark. Steaming via Guantánamo Bay, she returned to Norfolk, Virginia, 3 September.

During the next four years Maurice J. Manuel continued to take part in preparedness exercises. Her duties carried her from Argentia, Newfoundland, to Colón, Panama. In addition, she provided continued support to the Fleet Sonar School, and she conducted another midshipman cruise during July and August 1955.

=== Final decommissioning ===
After completing convoy training exercises off the east coast in May 1956, Maurice J. Manuel sailed to Philadelphia, Pennsylvania on 24 June for inactivation overhaul and decommissioned there on 30 October 1957. The ship entered the Atlantic Reserve Fleet. Her name was struck from the Navy List on 1 May 1966, and in August 1966 she was used as a target to destruction.
