= USS Formoe =

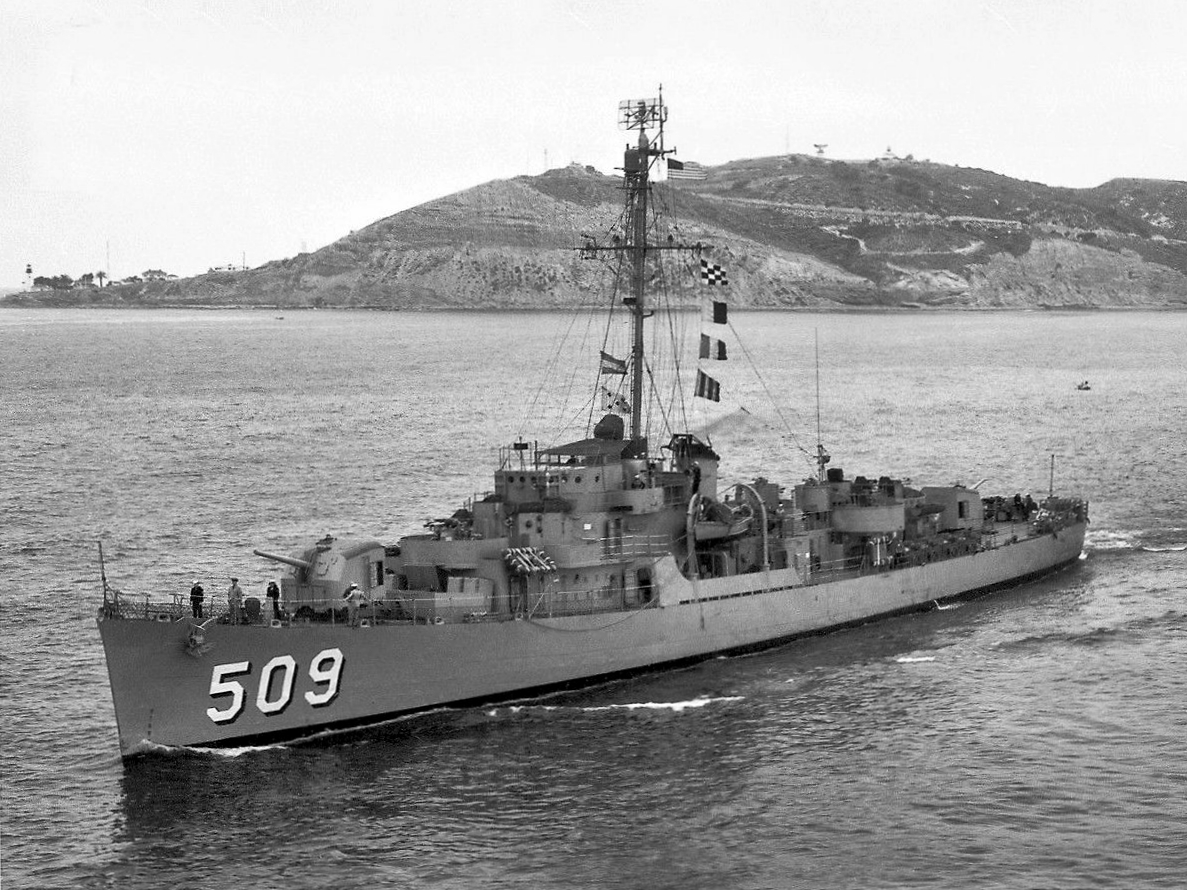

History

United States
- Name: USS Formoe (DE-509)
- Namesake: Aviation Machinist's Mate First Class Clarence Melvin Formoe (1909-1941)
- Builder: Federal Shipbuilding and Dry Dock Company, Newark, New Jersey
- Laid down: 3 January 1944
- Launched: 2 April 1944
- Sponsored by: Mrs. A. L. Bolshazy
- Commissioned: 5 October 1944
- Decommissioned: 27 May 1946
- Recommissioned: 27 June 1951
- Decommissioned: 7 February 1957
- Fate: Loaned to Portugal 7 February 1957
- Stricken: 1 October 1968
- Fate: Sold to Portugal December 1968

Portugal
- Name: NRP Diogo-Cão (F 333)
- Namesake: Diogo Cão, 15th-century Portuguese explorer
- Acquired: 7 February 1957 (on loan); December 1968 (purchased outright)
- Decommissioned: 19 November 1968
- Fate: Scrapped 1970

General characteristics
- Displacement: 1,350 long tons (1,372 t)
- Length: 306 ft (93 m) overall
- Beam: 36 ft 10 in (11.23 m)
- Draft: 13 ft 4 in (4.06 m) maximum
- Propulsion: 2 boilers, 2 geared steam turbines, 12,000 shp, 2 screws
- Speed: 24 knots (44 km/h)
- Range: 6,000 nm @ 12 knots (22 km/h)
- Complement: 14 officers, 201 enlisted
- Armament: 2-5 in (130 mm), 4 (2 × 2) 40 mm AA, 10-20 mm guns AA, 3-21 inch (533 mm) torpedo tubes, 1 Hedgehog, 8 depth charge projectors, 2 depth charge tracks

USS Formoe (DE-509) was a John C. Butler-class destroyer escort in service with the United States Navy from 1944 to 1946 and from 1951 to 1957. She was then transferred to Portugal, where she served as NRP Diogo-Cão (F-333) until 1968. She was scrapped in 1970.

== History ==
=== United States Navy (1944-1957) ===
Formoe was laid downby Federal Shipbuilding and Dry Dock Company, Newark, New Jersey on 3 January 1944 and launched on 2 April 1944, sponsored by Mrs. A. L. Bolshazy. The ship was commissioned on 5 October 1944.

==== Pacific War ====
Formoe arrived at Manus from the U.S. East Coast 15 January 1945, and ten days later sailed for Morotai to join a troop convoy bound with reinforcements for Lingayen. She entered Lingayen Gulf 10 February, and for the next month and a half operated in the Philippines, guarding minecraft and exploding the mines they swept in Baler Bay and Casiguran Sound, and sailing as escort from Lingayen to Leyte. From 21 to 30 March, Formoe patrolled off Panay in a picket line covering landings there, then continued her Philippine escort duty, making one voyage to Manus to bring landing craft north.

The escort departed Subic Bay 18 April 1945 to stage at Morotai for the invasion of Borneo. She arrived at Tarakan 1 May escorting the amphibious force, and from 3 to 30 May off Borneo, acting as headquarters ship for Captain Charles Gray, the officer commanding all naval activities at Tarakan. In addition to driving off several Japanese air attacks, she fired in four separate shore bombardments to support the troops advancing ashore. Between 2 June and the close of the war, Formoe ranged widely on escort duty, calling at Leyte, Hollandia, Ulithi, Manila, and Okinawa.

At Manila at the close of hostilities, she began occupation duty with a return voyage to Okinawa, then served as escort for the flagship of Fleet Air Wing 1 for most of the remainder of her career, calling at Shanghai and Hong Kong, as well as in Tokyo Bay. She returned to San Francisco, California, 20 January 1946, and was decommissioned and placed in reserve at San Diego, California, 27 May 1946.

==== Cold War ====
Recommissioned 27 June 1951, Formoe sailed from San Diego, California, 5 October 1951 for Newport, Rhode Island, her home port. For the next year she trained in New England and Caribbean waters, then served from October to December as training ship at the Fleet Sonar School, Key West, Florida. She had similar duty the next autumn, otherwise continuing her east coast and Caribbean operations until sailing from Newport 13 September 1954 to rejoin the U.S. Pacific Fleet.

From February through June 1955, and again from October 1955 to March 1956, Formoe carried out tours of duty in the Far East, taking part in hunter-killer operations and serving as station ship at Hong Kong.

=== Portuguese Navy (1957-1970) ===
Upon her return she prepared for foreign transfer at San Francisco, California, where she was decommissioned 7 February 1957 and transferred the same day to Portugal under the Mutual Defense Assistance Program. After being loaned to Portugal on 7 February 1957, the ship served in the Portuguese Navy as NRP Diogo-Cão (F-333) until decommissioned on 19 November 1968. The United States sold her to Portugal outright in December 1968, and she was scrapped in 1970.

== Military awards ==
Formoe received two battle stars for her World War II service.
