= USS Doyle C. Barnes =

1944 John C. Butler-class destroyer escort

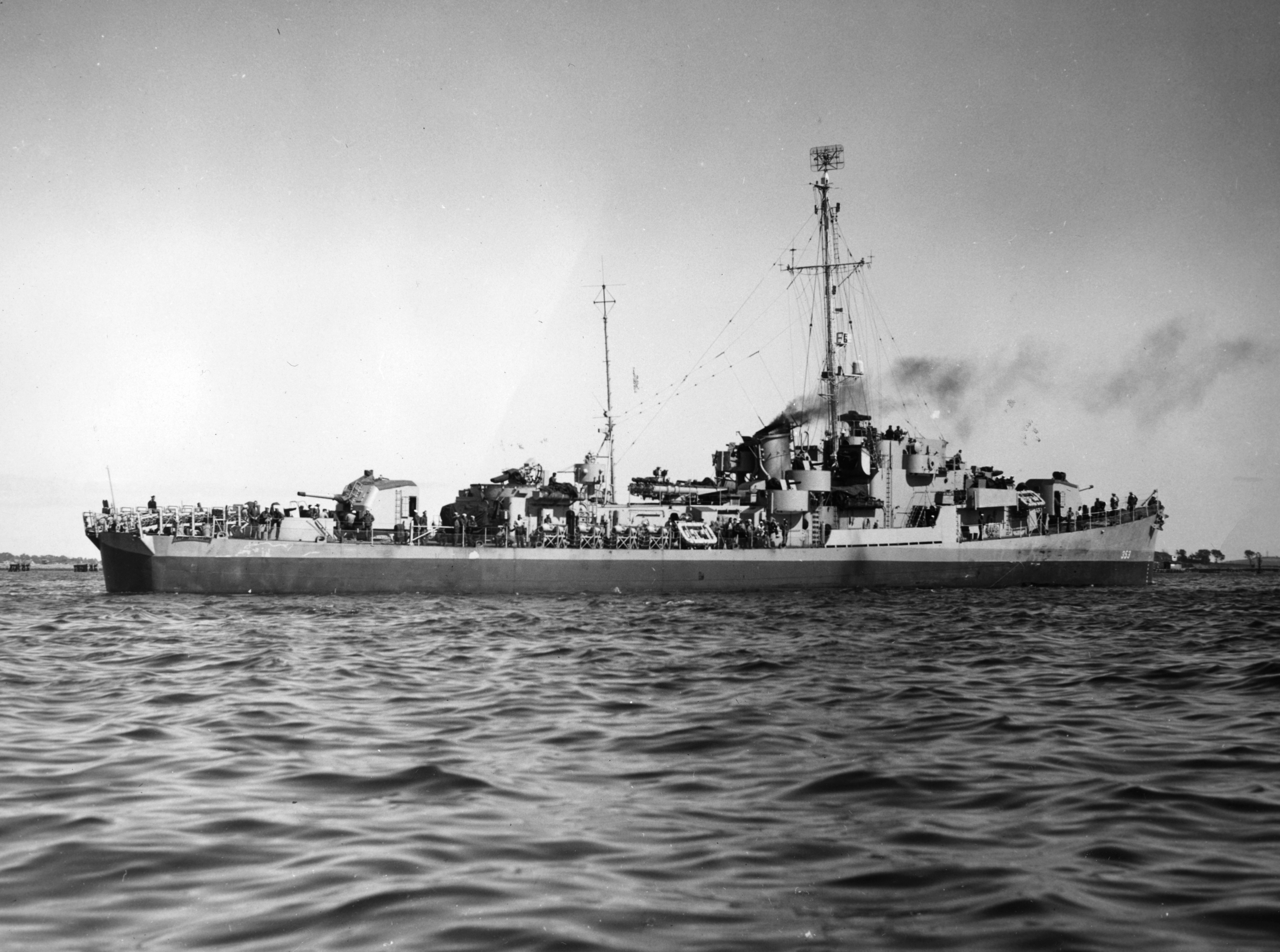
- USS Doyle C. Barnes on 23 September 1944

History

United States
- Name: Doyle C. Barnes
- Namesake: Doyle Clayton Barnes
- Builder: Consolidated Steel Corporation, Orange, Texas
- Laid down: 11 January 1944
- Launched: 4 March 1944
- Commissioned: 13 July 1944
- Decommissioned: 15 January 1947
- Stricken: 1 December 1972
- Fate: Sold for scrap 12 September 1973

General characteristics
- Class & type: John C. Butler-class destroyer escort
- Displacement: 1,350 long tons (1,372 t)
- Length: 306 ft (93 m)
- Beam: 36 ft 8 in (11.18 m)
- Draft: 9 ft 5 in (2.87 m)
- Propulsion: 2 boilers, 2 geared turbine engines, 12,000 shp (8,900 kW); 2 propellers
- Speed: 24 knots (44 km/h; 28 mph)
- Range: 6,000 nmi (11,000 km; 6,900 mi) at 12 kn (22 km/h; 14 mph)
- Complement: 14 officers, 201 enlisted
- Armament: 2 × single 5 in (127 mm) guns; 2 × twin 40 mm (1.6 in) AA guns; 10 × single 20 mm (0.79 in) AA guns; 1 × triple 21 in (533 mm) torpedo tubes; 8 × depth charge throwers; 1 × Hedgehog ASW mortar; 2 × depth charge racks

USS Doyle C. Barnes (DE-353) was a John C. Butler-class destroyer escort acquired by the U.S. Navy during World War II. The primary purpose of the destroyer escort was to escort and protect ships in convoy, in addition to other tasks as assigned, such as patrol or radar picket.

== Namesake ==
Doyle Clayton Barnes was born on 5 April 1912 in Oeniville, Texas. He enlisted in the Navy on 20 October 1933 and was designated naval aviator on 21 March 1942. Ensign Barnes received the Navy Cross for his heroism during the Battle of Midway on 4 June 1942, when he intercepted a flight of Imperial Japanese Navy aircraft and downed two torpedo planes. He was reported missing in action 24 August 1942, when his squadron, based on USS Enterprise, engaged the Japanese in the Battle of the Eastern Solomons.

== Construction and commissioning ==
She was launched on 4 March 1944 by Consolidated Steel Corp., Ltd., at Orange, Texas, sponsored by Mrs. D. C. Barnes, widow of Ensign Barnes. Doyle C. Barnes was commissioned on 13 July 1944.

== History ==
Doyle C. Barnes served as a school ship for officers destined for escort vessel service at Norfolk, Virginia, from 25 September to 21 October 1944, then sailed for New Guinea, arriving at Hollandia 28 November. She escorted convoys from Hollandia to San Pedro Bay, Leyte, patrolled in the Philippines, and took part in the assault and occupation of Borneo from 7 June to 20 July 1945.

Following the cessation of hostilities Doyle C. Barnes remained in the Far East, providing services at Okinawa, Manila, Qingdao, and Shanghai. She sailed from Qingdao 15 April 1946, arriving at San Pedro, Los Angeles on 11 May.

She was towed by USS ATR-66 to San Diego, California, and placed out of commission in reserve there 15 January 1947. She was struck from the Navy list on 1 December 1972 and was sold for scrap on 12 September 1973.
