= USS Gentry =

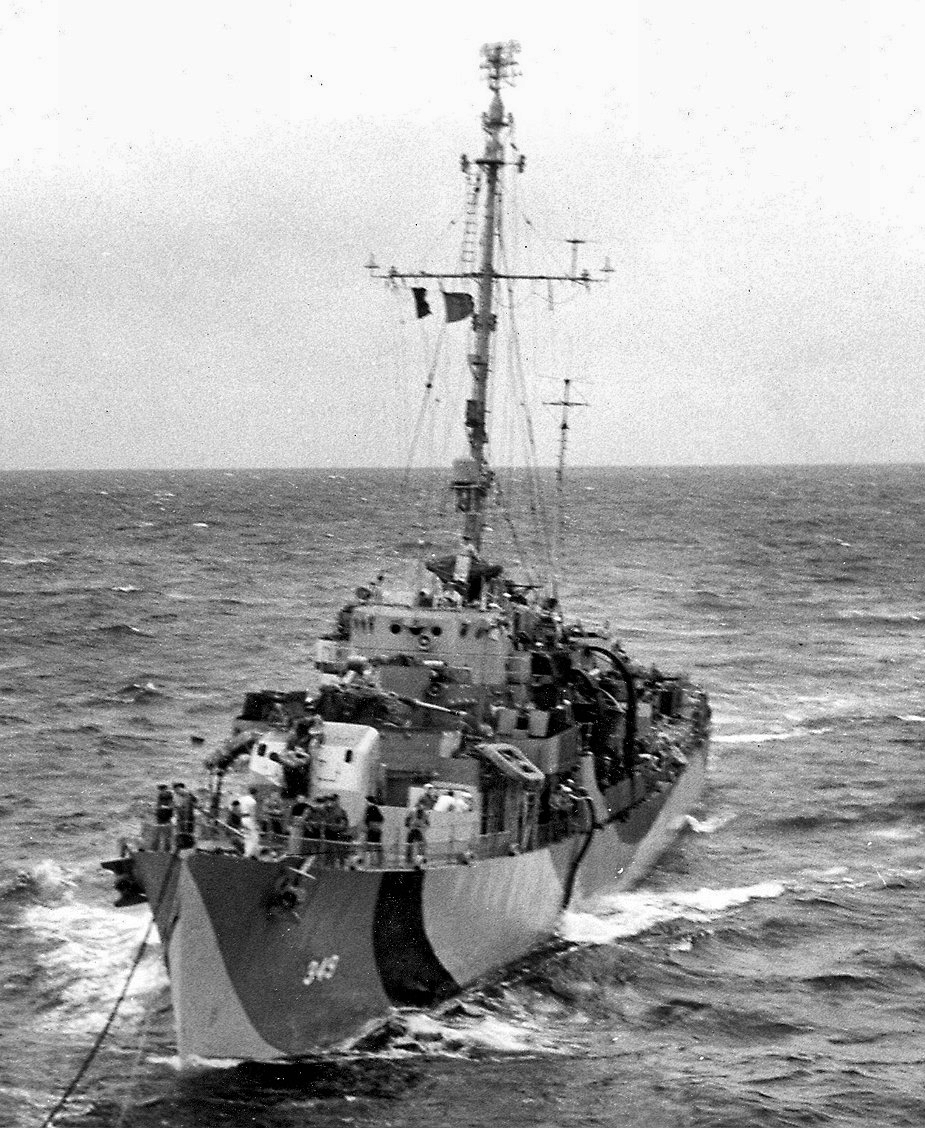
- USS Gentry underway on 15 October 1944

History

United States
- Name: Gentry
- Namesake: Wayne Roy Gentry
- Builder: Consolidated Steel Corporation, Orange, Texas
- Laid down: 13 December 1943
- Launched: 15 February 1944
- Commissioned: 14 June 1944
- Decommissioned: 2 July 1946
- Stricken: 15 January 1972
- Fate: Sold for scrapping 15 January 1973

General characteristics
- Class & type: John C. Butler-class destroyer escort
- Displacement: 1,350 long tons (1,372 t)
- Length: 306 ft (93 m)
- Beam: 36 ft 8 in (11.18 m)
- Draft: 9 ft 5 in (2.87 m)
- Propulsion: 2 boilers, 2 geared turbine engines, 12,000 shp (8,900 kW); 2 propellers
- Speed: 24 knots (44 km/h; 28 mph)
- Range: 6,000 nmi (11,000 km; 6,900 mi) at 12 kn (22 km/h; 14 mph)
- Complement: 14 officers, 201 enlisted
- Armament: 2 × single 5 in (127 mm) guns; 2 × twin 40 mm (1.6 in) AA guns; 10 × single 20 mm (0.79 in) AA guns; 1 × triple 21 in (533 mm) torpedo tubes; 8 × depth charge throwers; 1 × Hedgehog ASW mortar; 2 × depth charge racks

USS Gentry (DE-349) was a John C. Butler-class destroyer escort acquired by the United States Navy during World War II. The primary purpose of the destroyer escort was to escort and protect ships in convoy, in addition to other tasks as assigned, such as patrol or radar picket.

Gentry was named after Wayne Roy Gentry who was killed in action 2 November 1942 in the Solomon Islands area while serving as a pilot in a Marine Scout-Bombing Squadron and was posthumously awarded the Air Medal. The destroyer escort's keel was laid down 13 December 1943 by the Consolidated Steel Corporation at their yard in Orange, Texas. Gentry was launched on 15 February 1944, sponsored by Miss Jean Maxine Gentry, Lt. Gentry's sister and commissioned on 14 June 1944.

== Operational history ==
=== World War II North Atlantic operations ===
Following shakedown off Bermuda and duty as a school ship at Norfolk, Virginia, Gentry arrived at New York on 25 September 1944. Between 6 October and 23 December, she made two round-trip, convoy-escort voyages out of New York to Marseille, France, and Oran, Algeria. Gentry then sailed from New London, Connecticut on 9 January 1945 escorting the submarines Bullhead and Lionfish to Key West, Florida.

=== Transfer to the Pacific Fleet ===
The destroyer escort then continued via the Panama Canal to the Western Pacific, arriving at Manus, Admiralty Islands on 20 February. During the next four months Gentry escorted convoys between New Guinea and the Philippines, throughout the Philippine Archipelago, and from Manila Bay and Leyte Gulf to the Palaus and Western Carolines. In July she escorted a convoy to Okinawa and served on picket duty before returning Leyte late in the month.

=== End-of-war activity ===
After the Japanese capitulation 15 August, Gentry continued escorting convoys out of Leyte Gulf to New Guinea, Manila Bay, and|Okinawa. In addition, she served on air-sea rescue patrol in Leyte Gulf until 27 November when she departed Leyte for the United States. Arriving at Los Angeles, California on 18 December, she was towed to San Diego, California on 6 April 1946.

=== Post-war decommissioning ===
Gentry decommissioned there on 2 July 1946 and entered the Pacific Reserve Fleet at Stockton, California. She was later transferred to Mare Island, California. The destroyer escort was stricken 15 January 1972 and sold for scrap on 15 January 1973.
