= USS Hanna =

World War II destroyer escort

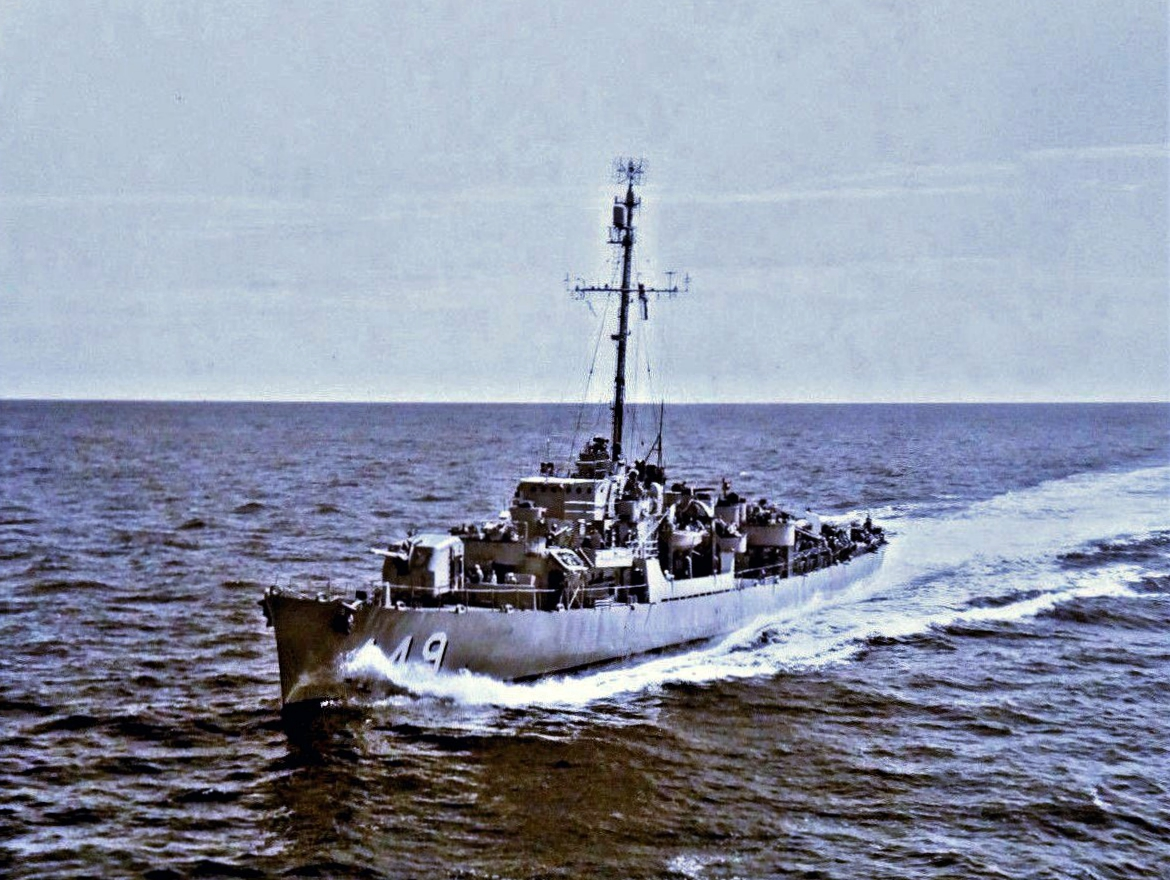

History

United States
- Name: USS Hanna (DE 449)
- Laid down: 23 March 1944
- Launched: 4 July 1944
- Commissioned: 27 January 1945
- Decommissioned: 31 May 1946
- In service: 27 December 1950
- Out of service: 11 December 1959
- Stricken: 1 December 1972
- Fate: Sold for scrapping 3 December 1973

General characteristics
- Displacement: 1,350 long tons (1,372 t)
- Length: 306 ft (93 m) overall
- Beam: 36 ft 10 in (11.23 m)
- Draught: 13 ft 4 in (4.06 m) maximum
- Propulsion: 2 boilers, 2 geared steam turbines, 12,000 shp, 2 screws
- Speed: 24 knots (44 km/h)
- Range: 6,000 nm @ 12 knots (22 km/h)
- Complement: 14 officers, 201 enlisted
- Armament: 2-5 in (130 mm), 4 (2 × 2) 40 mm AA, 10-20 mm guns AA, 3-21 inch (533 mm) torpedo tubes, 1 Hedgehog, 8 depth charge projectors, 2 depth charge tracks

USS Hanna (DE-449) was a John C. Butler-class destroyer escort acquired by the U.S. Navy during World War II. The primary purpose of the destroyer escort was to escort and protect ships in convoy, in addition to other tasks as assigned, such as patrol or radar picket. She returned home with five battle stars to her credit after she was reactivated for Korean War duty.

== Namesake ==
William T. Hanna was born on 23 October 1920 in New York City, New York. He enlisted in the U.S. Marine Corps on 14 January 1942. He was killed in action 9 October 1942 while attached to the 1st Marine Division Reinforced in the Guadalcanal campaign. He was posthumously awarded the Navy Cross and Purple Heart, his citation stated:

Fighting desperately in hand-to-hand combat against overwhelming hostile forces, Private Hanna refused to be dislodged from his position and after exacting a tremendous toll of the enemy, heroically died at his post.

== Construction and commissioning ==
She was launched 4 July 1944 by the Federal Shipbuilding & Drydock Co., Newark, New Jersey; sponsored by Mrs. William P. Hanna, mother; and commissioned 27 January 1945.

== World War II Pacific Theatre operations ==
After shakedown out of Bermuda and Guantánamo Bay, Hanna returned to New York 24 March 1945. Departing New York 9 April she escorted Akutan (AE-13) to Cristobal, Panama Canal Zone, then sailed via San Diego, California, arriving Pearl Harbor 4 May. After more intensive training and various escort missions in Hawaiian waters Hanna sailed 9 June for Eniwetok where she took up duty with Marshall-Gilberts Surface Patrol and Escort Group. This duty continued until 28 September after the Japanese surrender.

== End-of-war activity ==
Hanna and the U.S. prize Tachibana Maru formed the task unit to evacuate Japanese soldiers and sailors from Wake Island. Embarking 700 passengers they reached Tokyo 12 October. The U.S. Navy prize crew was withdrawn; the United States ensign hauled down; and Tachibana Maru turned over to the Japanese.

Departing Tokyo 24 October 1945 Hanna returned to Eniwetok and then sailed to Guam, where she took up duty as air-sea rescue and weather reporting ship. She continued this important task until her return to the States, where she decommissioned at San Diego, California, 31 May 1946 and joined the Pacific Reserve Fleet.

== Recommissioned during Korean War ==
Hanna recommissioned at San Diego 27 December 1950 to augment Navy strength in the Korean War.

Once more an active unit of the U.S. Pacific Fleet, Hanna served with Escort Squadron 9 until 16 April 1951 when she sailed for the Western Pacific. Here she served as patrol ship in the Formosa Straits. In June 1951 Hanna joined Task Force 95 for blockading and escort duties off the west coast of Korea. In August, while on shore bombardment mission in Wonsan Harbor Hanna was instrumental in silencing enemy shore batteries after a duel lasting more than 2 hours.

During the ensuing months Hanna served gallantly, operating with the Blockading and Escort Forces of Task Force 95. She was part of the antisubmarine and antiaircraft screen for the aircraft carriers launching repeated strikes against the Communists. In early November 1951 Hanna was detached for the United States, reaching San Diego 26 November for overhaul.

Three months later Hanna returned to the western Pacific and resumed her shore bombardment missions in addition to escorting damaged vessels and investigation of fishing craft. On 24 November 1952 Hanna came under heavy return fire from North Korean shore batteries and was hit amidships in the aft fireroom, mortally wounding MM3 Robert Potts. Potts was the last shipboard casualty killed by enemy action during the Korean war. She returned to San Diego 9 June 1953. After operations off the California coast Hanna departed 19 November for an island-hopping cruise of the Central Pacific, returning to San Diego 6 June 1954.

== Continued Pacific Ocean deployments ==
Between 9 November 1954 and 28 July 1957 Hanna made three more deployments to the western Pacific. On her last deployment Hanna took up patrolling the Central Carolines, Northern Marianas, the Bonins, and the Volcano Islands. In addition she participated in a rescue mission involving the Chinese Nationalist merchantman SS Ping Tung that had run aground on Yokoate Shima, an island of the Ryukyu chain.

A book, A Handful of Emeralds, by Joseph C. Meredith, was published in 1995 chronicling the USS Hanna's patrols in the western Pacific from December 1953 through May 1954.

== Training ship duties ==
Hanna's home port was changed to Long Beach, California, 26 November 1957 and she was designated a Naval Reserve Training Ship. She commenced the first of her reserve training cruises 6 February 1958 to Manzanillo, Mexico, and from that date until 27 August 1959 made 18 such cruises in addition to numerous weekend cruises.

== Final decommissioning ==
Hanna decommissioned at Mare Island 11 December 1959 and joined the Pacific Reserve Fleet.

== Military awards ==
Hanna received five battle stars for Korean service.
