= John C. Butler-class destroyer escort =

Class of American destroyer escorts

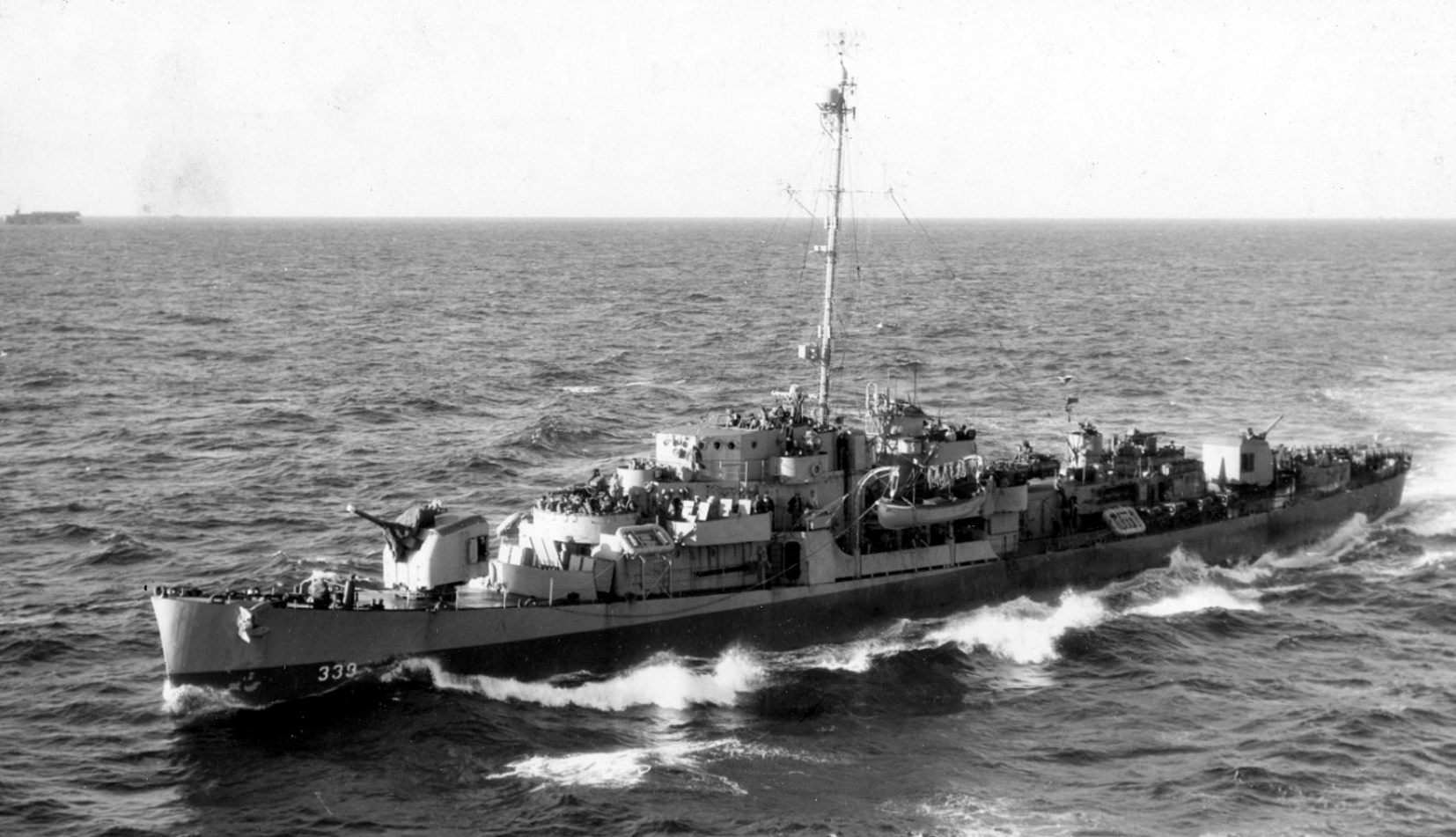
- USS John C. Butler on 1 March 1945

Class overview
- Name: John C. Butler class
- Builders: Consolidated Steel, TX (34); Brown Shipbuilding, TX (23); Federal Shipbuilding, NJ (16); Boston Navy Yard, MA (10)
- Operators: United States Navy; Portuguese Navy
- Preceded by: Rudderow class
- Succeeded by: Dealey class
- Built: 1943–1945
- In commission: 1943–1968
- Planned: 293
- Completed: 83
- Canceled: 210
- Lost: 3
- Retired: 80

General characteristics
- Type: Destroyer escort
- Displacement: 1,350 long tons (1,372 t) (standard); 1,745 long tons (1,773 t) (full load)
- Length: 306 ft (93.3 m)
- Beam: 37 ft (11.3 m)
- Draft: Light: 9 ft 4 in (2.8 m); Deep: 13 ft 4 in (4.1 m)
- Propulsion: Propulsion: 2 boilers, 2 geared turbine engines, 12,000 shp (8,900 kW); 2 propellers
- Speed: 24.3 kn (28.0 mph; 45.0 km/h) (trial); 24 kn (28 mph; 44 km/h) (service)
- Complement: Officers: 15; Enlisted: 183
- Sensors & processing systems: 1 × SC radar
- Armament: 2 × 5 in (127 mm)/38 caliber dual purpose guns; 4 × 40 mm anti-aircraft guns (2x2); later, 10 × 40 mm guns (1×4, 3×2); 10 × 20 mm anti-aircraft cannons; 3 x 21" torpedo tubes; later replaced by additional 40 mm guns; 8 × K-gun depth charge projectors; 2 × Depth charge racks; 1 × Hedgehog ASW mortar

The John C. Butler class were destroyer escorts that originated during World War II. The lead ship was USS John C. Butler, commissioned on 31 March 1944. The class was also known as the WGT type from their Westinghouse geared turbine drive. Of the 293 ships originally planned, 206 were canceled in 1944 and a further four after being laid down; three were not completed until after the end of World War II.

== History ==
The standard armament for the class was two 5 in (127 mm) dual purpose guns, four 40 mm and ten 20 mm anti-aircraft guns, and three 21-inch (533 mm) torpedo tubes. It also carried two depth charge racks, eight K-gun depth charge projectors and one hedgehog projector as secondary weapons. The ships had a maximum speed of 24 kn (28 mph; 44 km/h).

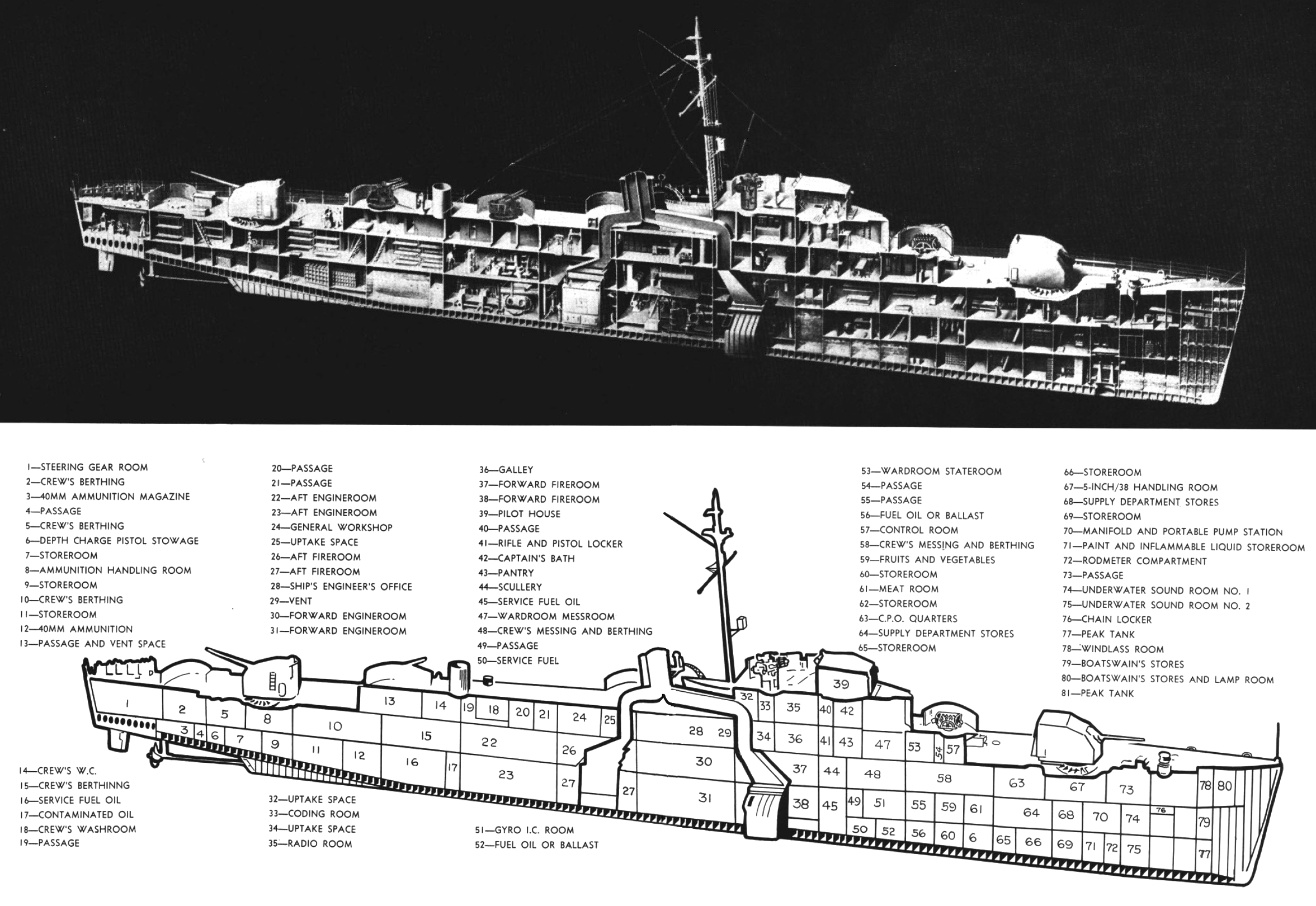

The most notable ship of this class was Samuel B. Roberts, which gained fame during the Battle of Leyte Gulf, where she, along with several other ships, engaged a number of cruisers and battleships of the Imperial Japanese Navy in a torpedo attack, where she was sunk after taking several hits. During this action, Samuel B. Roberts achieved a speed of 28.7 kn (33.0 mph; 53.2 km/h) for over an hour by running her engines at 660 psi (46 bar). She is known in naval lore as "the destroyer escort that fought like a battleship". The other two ships of this class lost were USS Shelton and USS Eversole.

Also notable was Tabberer for which Captain Henry Lee Plage earned the Legion of Merit, while the entire crew earned the Navy's Unit Commendation Ribbon for taking the initiative to rescue other ships after a disastrous storm. In December 1944, the ship lost her mast and radio antennas riding out Typhoon Cobra, which killed 790 sailors (more than were lost at the battles of Midway and Coral Sea combined). Although damaged and unable to radio for help, she was first on the scene to recover 55 of only 93 total rescued from three destroyers which capsized in the heavy seas.

A floating history museum of the destroyer escorts resides in Albany, New York. USS Slater (a related Cannon-class destroyer escort) is docked during temperate months on the Hudson River in Albany, New York. An Edsall-class destroyer escort, USS Stewart, is also on display as a museum ship in Galveston, Texas.

== Ships in class ==
Construction data
Ship Name	Hull no.	Builder	Laid down	Launched	Comm.	Decomm.	Fate
John C. Butler	DE-339	Consolidated Steel Corporation, Orange, Texas	5 October 1943	12 November 1943	31 March 1944	18 December 1957	Struck 1 June 1970, sunk as target 1971
O'Flaherty	DE-340	Consolidated Steel Corporation, Orange, Texas	4 October 1943	14 December 1943	8 April 1944	January 1947	Struck 1 December 1972, sold for scrap 27 November 1973
Raymond	DE-341	Consolidated Steel Corporation, Orange, Texas	3 November 1943	8 January 1944	15 April 1944	22 September 1958	Struck 1 July 1972, sunk as target off Florida on 22 January 1974
Richard W. Suesens	DE-342	Consolidated Steel Corporation, Orange, Texas	1 November 1943	11 January 1944	26 April 1944	15 January 1947	Struck 15 March 1972, sold for scrap 13 June 1973
Abercrombie	DE-343	Consolidated Steel Corporation, Orange, Texas	8 November 1943	14 January 1944	1 May 1944	15 June 1946	Struck 1 May 1967, sunk as target 7 January 1968
Oberrender	DE-344	Consolidated Steel Corporation, Orange, Texas	8 November 1943	18 January 1944	11 May 1944	11 July 1945	Struck 25 July 1945, sunk as a target 6 November 1945
Robert Brazier	DE-345	Consolidated Steel Corporation, Orange, Texas	16 November 1943	22 January 1944	18 May 1944	16 September 1946	Struck 1 January 1968, sunk as target off California 9 January 1969
Edwin A. Howard	DE-346	Consolidated Steel Corporation, Orange, Texas	15 November 1943	25 January 1944	25 May 1944	25 September 1946	Struck 1 December 1972, sold for scrap 12 September 1973
Jesse Rutherford	DE-347	Consolidated Steel Corporation, Orange, Texas	22 November 1943	29 January 1944	31 May 1944	21 June 1946	Struck 1 January 1968, sunk as target off California 8 December 1968
Key	DE-348	Consolidated Steel Corporation, Orange, Texas	14 December 1943	12 February 1944	5 June 1944	9 July 1946	Struck 1 March 1972, sold for scrap 19 December 1972
Gentry	DE-349	Consolidated Steel Corporation, Orange, Texas	13 December 1943	15 February 1944	14 June 1944	2 July 1946	Struck 15 January 1972, sold for scrap 15 January 1973
Traw	DE-350	Consolidated Steel Corporation, Orange, Texas	19 December 1943	12 February 1944	20 June 1944	7 June 1946	Struck 1 August 1967, sunk as target off California 17 August 1968
Maurice J. Manuel	DE-351	Consolidated Steel Corporation, Orange, Texas	22 December 1943	19 February 1944	30 June 1944	30 October 1957	Struck 1 May 1966, sunk as target August 1966
Naifeh	DE-352	Consolidated Steel Corporation, Orange, Texas	29 December 1943	29 February 1944	4 July 1944	17 June 1960	Struck 1 January 1966, sunk as a target 11 July 1966
Doyle C. Barnes	DE-353	Consolidated Steel Corporation, Orange, Texas	11 January 1944	4 March 1944	13 July 1944	15 January 1947	Struck 1 December 1972, sold for scrap 12 September 1973
Kenneth M. Willett	DE-354	Consolidated Steel Corporation, Orange, Texas	10 January 1944	7 March 1944	19 July 1944	26 February 1959	Struck 1 July 1972, sunk as target off Puerto Rico 6 March 1974
Jaccard	DE-355	Consolidated Steel Corporation, Orange, Texas	25 January 1944	18 March 1944	26 July 1944	30 September 1946	Struck 1 November 1967, sunk as target 4 October 1968
Lloyd E. Acree	DE-356	Consolidated Steel Corporation, Orange, Texas	24 January 1944	21 March 1944	1 August 1944	10 October 1946	Struck 15 January 1972, sold for scrap 13 June 1973
George E. Davis	DE-357	Consolidated Steel Corporation, Orange, Texas	15 February 1944	8 April 1944	11 August 1944	11 November 1954	Struck 1 December 1972, sold for scrap 2 January 1974
Mack	DE-358	Consolidated Steel Corporation, Orange, Texas	14 February 1944	11 April 1944	16 August 1944	11 December 1946	Struck 15 March 1972, sold for scrap 13 June 1973
Woodson	DE-359	Consolidated Steel Corporation, Orange, Texas	7 March 1944	29 April 1944	24 August 1944	11 August 1962	Struck 1 July 1965, sold for scrap 16 August 1966
Johnnie Hutchins	DE-360	Consolidated Steel Corporation, Orange, Texas	6 March 1944	2 May 1944	28 August 1944	25 February 1958	Struck 1 July 1972, sold for scrap 5 February 1974
Walton	DE-361	Consolidated Steel Corporation, Orange, Texas	21 March 1944	20 May 1944	4 September 1944	20 September 1968	Struck 23 September 1968, sunk as target 7 August 1969
Rolf	DE-362	Consolidated Steel Corporation, Orange, Texas	20 March 1944	23 May 1944	7 September 1944	3 June 1946	Struck 1 December 1972, sold for scrap 11 September 1973
Pratt	DE-363	Consolidated Steel Corporation, Orange, Texas	11 April 1944	1 June 1944	18 September 1944	14 May 1946	Struck 15 March 1972, sold for scrap 15 January 1973
Rombach	DE-364	Consolidated Steel Corporation, Orange, Texas	10 April 1944	6 June 1944	20 September 1944	9 January 1958	Struck 1 March 1972, sold for scrap 19 December 1972
McGinty	DE-365	Consolidated Steel Corporation, Orange, Texas	3 May 1944	5 August 1944	25 September 1944	23 September 1968	Struck 23 September 1968, sold for scrap 27 October 1969
Alvin C. Cockrell	DE-366	Consolidated Steel Corporation, Orange, Texas	1 May 1944	8 August 1944	7 October 1944	17 January 1959	Struck 23 September 1968, sunk as target off California 19 September 1969
French	DE-367	Consolidated Steel Corporation, Orange, Texas	1 May 1944	17 June 1944	9 October 1944	29 May 1946	Struck 15 May 1972, sold for scrap 20 September 1973
Cecil J. Doyle	DE-368	Consolidated Steel Corporation, Orange, Texas	12 May 1944	1 July 1944	16 October 1944	2 July 1946	Struck 1 July 1967, sunk as target 2 December 1967
Thaddeus Parker	DE-369	Consolidated Steel Corporation, Orange, Texas	23 May 1944	26 August 1944	25 October 1944	1 September 1967	Struck 1 September 1967, sold for scrap 9 July 1968
John L. Williamson	DE-370	Consolidated Steel Corporation, Orange, Texas	22 May 1944	29 August 1944	31 October 1944	14 June 1946	Struck 15 September 1970, sold for scrap 13 June 1973
Presley	DE-371	Consolidated Steel Corporation, Orange, Texas	6 June 1944	19 August 1944	7 November 1944	20 June 1946	Struck 30 June 1968, sold for scrap 2 April 1970
Williams	DE-372	Consolidated Steel Corporation, Orange, Texas	5 June 1944	22 August 1944	11 November 1944	4 June 1946	Struck 1 July 1967, sunk as target off California 29 June 1968
Richard S. Bull	DE-402	Brown Shipbuilding, Houston, Texas	18 August 1943	16 November 1943	26 February 1944	March 1946	Struck 30 June 1968, sunk as target off California, 24 June 1969
Richard M. Rowell	DE-403	Brown Shipbuilding, Houston, Texas	18 August 1943	17 November 1943	9 March 1944	2 July 1946	Struck 30 June 1968, sold for scrap June 1969
Eversole	DE-404	Brown Shipbuilding, Houston, Texas	15 September 1943	3 December 1943	21 March 1944	—N/a	Sunk by Japanese Submarine I-45 off Leyte 28 October 1944
Dennis	DE-405	Brown Shipbuilding, Houston, Texas	15 September 1943	4 December 1943	20 March 1944	31 May 1946	Struck 1 December 1972, sold for scrap 12 September 1973
Edmonds	DE-406	Brown Shipbuilding, Houston, Texas	1 November 1943	17 December 1943	3 April 1944	April 1965	Struck 15 May 1972, sold for scrap 20 September 1973
Shelton	DE-407	Brown Shipbuilding, Houston, Texas	1 November 1943	18 December 1943	4 April 1944	—N/a	Sunk by Japanese submarine Ro-41 off Morotai 3 October 1944
Straus	DE-408	Brown Shipbuilding, Houston, Texas	18 November 1943	30 December 1943	6 April 1944	15 January 1947	Struck 1 May 1966, sunk as target August 1973
La Prade	DE-409	Brown Shipbuilding, Houston, Texas	18 November 1943	31 December 1943	20 April 1944	11 May 1946	Struck 15 January 1972, sold for scrap 15 January 1973
Jack Miller	DE-410	Brown Shipbuilding, Houston, Texas	29 November 1943	10 January 1944	13 April 1944	1 June 1946	Struck 30 June 1968, sold for scrap July 1969
Stafford	DE-411	Brown Shipbuilding, Houston, Texas	29 November 1943	11 January 1944	19 April 1944	16 May 1946	Struck 15 March 1972, sold for scrap 13 June 1973
Walter C. Wann	DE-412	Brown Shipbuilding, Houston, Texas	6 December 1943	19 January 1944	2 May 1944	31 May 1946	Struck 30 June 1968, sold for scrap June 1969
Samuel B. Roberts	DE-413	Brown Shipbuilding, Houston, Texas	6 December 1943	20 January 1944	28 April 1944	—N/a	Sunk during the Battle off Samar 25 October 1944
LeRay Wilson	DE-414	Brown Shipbuilding, Houston, Texas	20 December 1943	28 January 1944	10 May 1944	30 January 1959	Struck 15 May 1972, sold for scrap 14 September 1973
Lawrence C. Taylor	DE-415	Brown Shipbuilding, Houston, Texas	20 December 1943	29 January 1944	13 May 1944	23 April 1946	Struck 1 December 1972, sold for scrap 12 September 1973
Melvin R. Nawman	DE-416	Brown Shipbuilding, Houston, Texas	3 January 1944	7 February 1944	16 May 1944	30 August 1960	Struck 1 July 1972, sold for scrap 3 October 1973
Oliver Mitchell	DE-417	Brown Shipbuilding, Houston, Texas	3 January 1944	8 February 1944	14 June 1944	24 April 1946	Struck 15 March 1972, sold for scrap 15 January 1973
Tabberer	DE-418	Brown Shipbuilding, Houston, Texas	12 January 1944	18 February 1944	23 May 1944	May 1960	Struck 1 July 1972, sold for scrap 3 October 1973
Robert F. Keller	DE-419	Brown Shipbuilding, Houston, Texas	12 January 1944	19 February 1944	17 June 1944	January 1965	Struck 1 July 1972, sold for scrap 5 February 1974
Leland E. Thomas	DE-420	Brown Shipbuilding, Houston, Texas	21 January 1944	28 February 1944	19 June 1944	3 May 1946	Struck 1 December 1972, sold for scrap 11 September 1973
Chester T. O'Brien	DE-421	Brown Shipbuilding, Houston, Texas	21 January 1944	29 February 1944	3 July 1944	25 May 1960	Struck 1 July 1972, sold for scrap 4 April 1974
Douglas A. Munro	DE-422	Brown Shipbuilding, Houston, Texas	31 January 1944	8 March 1944	11 July 1944	24 June 1960	Struck 1 December 1965, sunk as target January 1966
Dufilho	DE-423	Brown Shipbuilding, Houston, Texas	31 January 1944	9 March 1944	21 July 1944	14 May 1946	Struck 1 December 1972, Sold for scrap 12 September 1973
Haas	DE-424	Brown Shipbuilding, Houston, Texas	23 February 1944	20 March 1944	2 August 1944	24 January 1958	Struck 1 July 1966, sold for scrap 6 September 1967
Corbesier	DE-438	Federal Shipbuilding and Drydock Company, Newark, New Jersey	4 November 1943	13 February 1944	31 March 1944	2 July 1946	Struck 1 December 1972, sold for scrap 3 December 1973
Conklin	DE-439	Federal Shipbuilding and Drydock Company, Newark, New Jersey	4 November 1943	13 February 1944	21 April 1944	17 January 1946	Struck 1 October 1970, sold for scrap 12 May 1972
McCoy Reynolds	DE-440	Federal Shipbuilding and Drydock Company, Newark, New Jersey	18 November 1943	22 February 1944	2 May 1944	7 February 1957	Struck 1 November 1968, sold to Portugal December 1968, scrapped 1970
William Seiverling	DE-441	Federal Shipbuilding and Drydock Company, Newark, New Jersey	2 December 1943	7 March 1944	1 June 1944	27 September 1957	Struck 1 December 1972, sold for scrap 20 September 1973
Ulvert M. Moore	DE-442	Federal Shipbuilding and Drydock Company, Newark, New Jersey	2 December 1943	7 March 1944	18 July 1944	10 October 1958	Struck 1 December 1965, sunk as target off San Nicholas Isle, California on 13 July 1966
Kendall C. Campbell	DE-443	Federal Shipbuilding and Drydock Company, Newark, New Jersey	16 December 1943	19 March 1944	31 July 1944	31 May 1946	Struck 15 January 1972, sold for scrap 15 January 1973
Goss	DE-444	Federal Shipbuilding and Drydock Company, Newark, New Jersey	16 December 1943	19 March 1944	26 August 1944	10 October 1958	Struck 1 March 1972, sold for scrap 20 November 1972
Grady	DE-445	Federal Shipbuilding and Drydock Company, Newark, New Jersey	3 January 1944	2 April 1944	11 September 1944	18 December 1957	Struck 30 June 1968, sold for scrap June 1969
Charles E. Brannon	DE-446	Federal Shipbuilding and Drydock Company, Newark, New Jersey	13 January 1944	23 April 1944	1 November 1944	23 September 1968	Struck 23 September 1968, sold for scrap 27 October 1969
Albert T. Harris	DE-447	Federal Shipbuilding and Drydock Company, Newark, New Jersey	13 January 1944	16 April 1944	29 November 1944	21 September 1968	Struck 23 September 1968, sunk as target off the Virginia Capes, 9 April 1969
Cross	DE-448	Federal Shipbuilding and Drydock Company, Newark, New Jersey	19 March 1944	4 July 1944	8 January 1945	2 January 1958	Struck 1 July 1966, sold for scrap 5 March 1968
Hanna	DE-449	Federal Shipbuilding and Drydock Company, Newark, New Jersey	23 March 1944	4 July 1944	27 January 1945	11 December 1959	Struck 1 December 1972, sold for scrap 3 December 1973
Joseph E. Connolly	DE-450	Federal Shipbuilding and Drydock Company, Newark, New Jersey	6 April 1944	6 August 1944	28 February 1945	20 June 1946	Struck 1 June 1970, sunk as target on 24 February 1972
Gilligan	DE-508	Federal Shipbuilding and Drydock Company, Newark, New Jersey	18 November 1943	22 February 1944	12 May 1944	31 March 1959	Struck 1 March 1972, sold for scrap 20 November 1973
Formoe	DE-509	Federal Shipbuilding and Drydock Company, Newark, New Jersey	3 January 1944	2 April 1944	5 October 1944	7 February 1957	Loaned to Portugal 7 February 1957, struck 1 October 1968, scrapped 1970
Heyliger	DE-510	Federal Shipbuilding and Drydock Company, Newark, New Jersey	27 April 1944	6 August 1944	24 March 1945	2 January 1958	Struck 1 May 1966, sunk as target in 1969
Edward H. Allen	DE-531	Boston Naval Shipyard	31 August 1943	7 October 1943	16 December 1943	9 January 1958	Struck 1 July 1972, sold for scrap 5 February 1974
Tweedy	DE-532	Boston Naval Shipyard	31 August 1943	7 October 1943	12 February 1944	30 June 1969	Struck 30 June 1969, sunk as target off Florida May 1970
Howard F. Clark	DE-533	Boston Naval Shipyard	8 October 1943	8 November 1943	25 May 1944	5 July 1946	Struck 15 May 1972, sold for scrap 6 September 1973
Silverstein	DE-534	Boston Naval Shipyard	8 October 1943	8 November 1943	14 July 1944	30 January 1959	Struck 1 December 1972, sold for scrap 3 December 1973
Lewis	DE-535	Boston Naval Shipyard	3 November 1943	7 December 1943	5 September 1944	27 May 1960	Struck 1 January 1966, sunk as target in 1966
Bivin	DE-536	Boston Naval Shipyard	3 November 1943	7 December 1943	31 October 1944	15 January 1947	Struck 30 June 1968, sunk as target off California on 17 July 1969
Rizzi	DE-537	Boston Naval Shipyard	3 November 1943	7 December 1943	26 June 1945	28 February 1958	Struck 1 August 1972, sold for scrap 5 February 1974
Osberg	DE-538	Boston Naval Shipyard	3 November 1943	7 December 1943	10 December 1945	25 February 1958	Struck 1 August 1972, sold for scrap 5 February 1974
Wagner	DE-539	Boston Naval Shipyard	8 November 1943	27 December 1943	22 November 1955	June 1960	Struck 1 November 1974, sunk as target
Vandivier	DE-540	Boston Naval Shipyard	8 November 1943	27 December 1943	11 October 1955	30 June 1960	Struck 1 November 1974, sunk as target off Florida 7 February 1975
