= USS Grady =

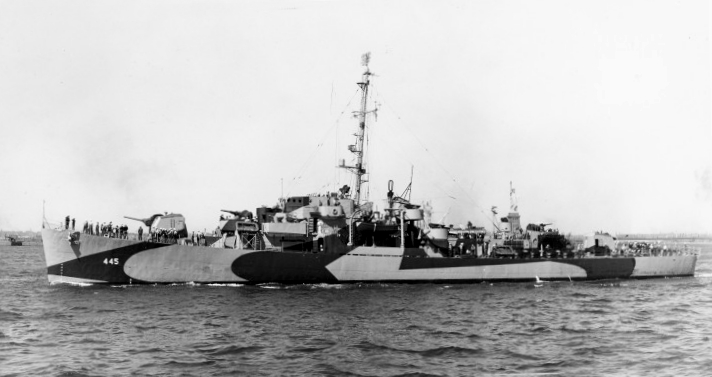

History

United States
- Laid down: 3 January 1944
- Launched: 2 April 1944
- Commissioned: 11 September 1944
- Decommissioned: 2 July 1946
- In service: 13th Naval District, 27 April 1947
- Out of service: 18 December 1957
- Stricken: 30 June 1968
- Fate: Sold for scrapping June 1969

General characteristics
- Displacement: 1,350 long tons (1,372 t)
- Length: 306 ft (93 m) overall
- Beam: 36 ft 10 in (11.23 m)
- Draught: 13 ft 4 in (4.06 m) maximum
- Propulsion: 2 boilers, 2 geared steam turbines, 12,000 shp, 2 screws
- Speed: 24 knots (44 km/h)
- Range: 6,000 nm @ 12 knots (22 km/h)
- Complement: 14 officers, 201 enlisted
- Armament: 2-5 in (130 mm), 4 (2 × 2) 40 mm AA, 10-20 mm guns AA, 3-21 inch (533 mm) torpedo tubes, 1 Hedgehog, 8 depth charge projectors, 2 depth charge tracks

USS Grady (DE-445) was a John C. Butler-class destroyer escort in service with the United States Navy from 1944 to 1946 and from 1947 to 1957. She was sold for scrapping in 1969.

== Namesake ==
George Francis Grady was born on 28 April 1920 in New York City. He enlisted in the United States Marine Corps on 11 October 1938. Assigned to the 1st Marine Division, Corporal Grady was killed in action on Gavutu, Solomon Islands, on 7 August 1942. Grady charged an entrenched group of eight Japanese soldiers. Firing his submachine gun, he killed two before his gun jammed. Using the inoperable gun as a club he bludgeoned one enemy soldier to death. He then withdrew his knife from his sheath and killed two more enemy soldiers before himself being killed by the other three. Grady was posthumously awarded the Navy Cross.

== History ==
Grady was launched by Federal Shipbuilding & Dry Dock Co., Newark, New Jersey, 2 April 1944; sponsored by Miss Margaret Grady, sister of the namesake; and commissioned 11 September 1944. Grady conducted her shakedown training at Bermuda 2 October – 2 November. Returning to Boston, Massachusetts, the ship sailed 17 November for Norfolk, Virginia, escorting transport Chilton (APA-38), and from Norfolk continued through the Panama Canal to San Diego, California, where she arrived 4 December. Grady sailed immediately via San Francisco, California, for Pearl Harbor, where she arrived 15 December 1944. Until 23 December she operated with carrier Saratoga (CV-3) during flight qualifications, rescuing three downed aviators.

With the American offensive in the Pacific then entering its climactic phase, Grady departed 26 December 1944 for Eniwetok and Ulithi, arriving the latter base 10 January 1945. For the next month the ship acted as escort to a vital tanker group engaged in refueling units of the U.S. 3rd Fleet at sea, units then engaged in air strikes against Taiwan and mainland China mainland. She then proceeded off Iwo Jima 10 February to screen escort carriers during the pre-invasion bombardment. During the assault 19 February Grady patrolled in an antisubmarine screen, and departed the area 2 March en route to Saipan.

Arriving at Saipan 5 March, Grady refueled and departed the next day for Espiritu Santo. Upon her arrival 19 March, the ship joined in preparations for the upcoming Okinawa invasion, last giant step on the long sea road to Japan. She got underway in convoy 25 March, and after stopping at Ulithi arrived off the invasion beaches 9 April. As the bloody fighting raged ashore, Grady and the other ships engaged in equally fierce radar and antisubmarine picket duty were savagely attacked by Japanese suicide planes. Grady and Metcalf downed one of the kamikazes 16 April while at station D-37 off Okinawa. The escort vessel escorted five fast transports to Saipan 5 – 16 May, and then returned to the picket stations off Okinawa, occasionally helping to provide antiaircraft fire in the huge transport anchorages.

Grady continued this arduous duty until 28 June, when she sailed for Leyte Gulf. Arriving 1 July in the Philippines, she was assigned as offshore patrol vessel and remained in the islands until 5 November 1945, twice making convoy voyages to Okinawa.

Grady began the long voyage home on 5 November, two months after the surrender of Japan. Cruising via Manila Bay and Pearl Harbor, she arrived at San Pedro, Los Angeles, 26 November. Scheduled for deactivation, the ship was towed to San Diego, California, and decommissioned 2 July 1946.

=== Postwar career ===
Placed in the San Diego Group, Pacific Reserve Fleet, Grady remained inactive until 27 April 1947, when she was placed in an "In Service in Reserve" status. For the next 3 years the ship served as a Naval Reserve Training vessel under the 13th Naval District. Based at Bellingham, Washington, she cruised for 2 or 3-week periods training reservists. Grady was placed in an "In Commission In Reserve" status 1 August 1950, and recommissioned in the active fleet 21 November 1950. The ship was placed under the 12th Naval District at San Francisco, California, continuing her important role as training ship for reserve officers and men, and as school ship for Fleet Sonar School, San Diego, California. Grady decommissioned a second time 18 December 1957 and was placed in reserve at Stockton, California. She was finally sold for scrapping in June 1969.

== Military awards ==
Grady received three battle stars for World War II Service.
