= USS Jesse Rutherford =

US Navy destroyer escort

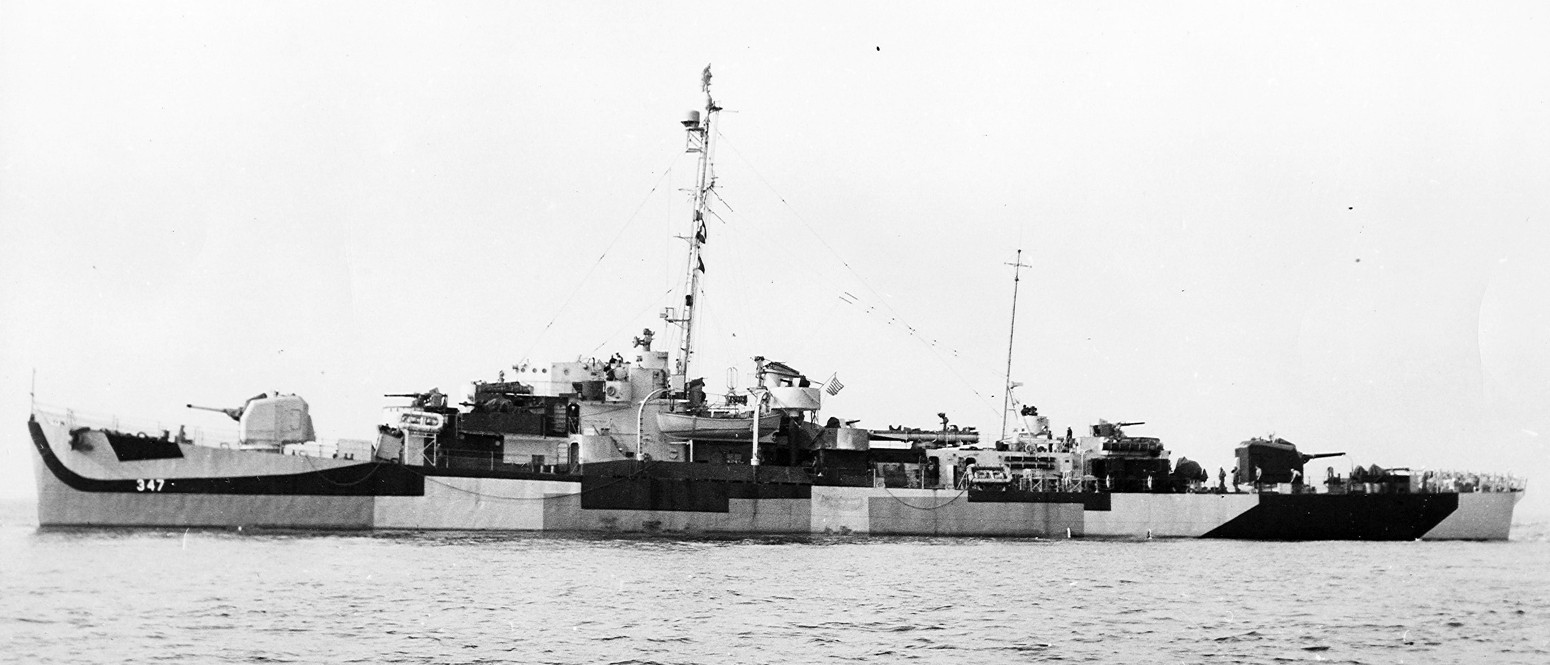
- At New York, November 1944

History

United States
- Name: Jesse Rutherford
- Namesake: Jesse Rutherford Jr.
- Builder: Consolidated Steel Corporation, Orange, Texas
- Laid down: 22 November 1943
- Launched: 29 January 1944
- Commissioned: 31 May 1944
- Decommissioned: 21 June 1946
- Stricken: 1 January 1968
- Honours and awards: 1 battle star for World War II
- Fate: Sunk as target off California 8 December 1968

General characteristics
- Class & type: John C. Butler-class destroyer escort
- Displacement: 1,350 long tons (1,372 t)
- Length: 306 ft (93 m)
- Beam: 36 ft 8 in (11.18 m)
- Draft: 9 ft 5 in (2.87 m)
- Propulsion: 2 boilers, 2 geared turbine engines, 12,000 shp (8,900 kW) 2 propellers
- Speed: 24 knots (44 km/h; 28 mph)
- Range: 6,000 nmi (11,000 km; 6,900 mi) at 12 kn (22 km/h; 14 mph)
- Complement: 14 officers, 201 enlisted
- Armament: 2 × single 5 in (127 mm) guns; 2 × twin 40 mm (1.6 in) AA guns; 10 × single 20 mm (0.79 in) AA guns; 1 × triple 21 in (533 mm) torpedo tubes; 8 × depth charge throwers; 1 × Hedgehog ASW mortar; 2 × depth charge racks

USS Jesse Rutherford (DE-347) was a John C. Butler-class destroyer escort acquired by the United States Navy during World War II and named in honor of Private Jesse Rutherford Jr., USMC. Her primary purpose was to escort and protect ships in convoys; other tasks assigned included patrol and radar picket. Post-war, she returned home with one battle star to her credit.

The keel for Jesse Rutherford was laid down by Consolidated Steel Corp., Orange, Texas on 22 November 1943. The destroyer escort was launched on 29 January 1944, sponsored by Mrs. Mary Rutherford, mother of Private Rutherford. Jesse Rutherford was commissioned on 31 May 1944.

== Namesake ==
Jesse Rutherford Jr. was born on 12 January 1923 in Salmon, Idaho. Rutherford enlisted in the United States Marine Corps on 14 July 1941. After undergoing basic training at San Diego, California, he reported to carrier USS Lexington on 8 November 1941.

During the Battle of the Coral Sea on 8 May 1942, Lexington was hit by two bombs and two torpedoes. Rutherford, "loading shells into fuse pots" in a gun mount, was seriously injured in the attack; but he remained at his post. In the language of his citation, "although mortally wounded by the fragments of a bursting bomb, he displayed outstanding courage and a loyal determination to keep his gun in action despite his injured condition, and valiantly remained at his station "loading shells into fuse pots" until he collapsed on the deck." Rutherford was posthumously awarded the Navy Cross for his heroism.

== Service history ==
Jesse Rutherford, departed Galveston, Texas on 7 July 1944 for shakedown training in waters off Bermuda. The ship then sailed to Boston, Massachusetts, arriving on 13 August to prepare for Atlantic convoy duty. She engaged in more underway training off the U.S. East Coast before sailing from Norfolk, Virginia on 20 September with her first convoy. The transports arrived at Naples, Italy on 4 October and Jesse Rutherford returned to New York on 24 October.

=== Pacific War operations ===
At New York the destroyer escort received the newest in equipment and armament in preparation for the Pacific War, then about to enter its final stages. She sailed on 10 November 1944 with Escort Division 76, bound for the Panama Canal, the Galápagos Islands, and eventually the Society Islands. Jesse Rutherford arrived at Bora Bora on 5 December and departed the next day for the large American staging base on Manus Island. From there the ship was assigned to escort convoys from Hollandia through Leyte Gulf in support of the Allied campaign to recapture the Philippines.

In the months that followed Jesse Rutherford made nine voyages to Leyte, and in March 1945, she steamed in Lingayen Gulf as well. Arriving at Biak after another escort voyage on 30 May, the destroyer escort formed a group of LSTs into a convoy and departed for Manila. Off Mindoro, however, the destroyer escort encountered a merchantman in distress and drifting onto the beach. In response, Jesse Rutherford took the freighter in tow and held her off the beach until a tugboat could relieve her the next day. The destroyer escort arrived at Subic Bay on 8 June.

Additional convoy duty in the Philippines occupied Jesse Rutherford until July. She departed Morotai on 12 July with amphibious craft to reinforce the Allied landing at Balikpapan, Borneo, remaining there until 22 July. The ship then sailed back to Leyte in convoy, and patrolled San Bernardino Strait until war's end. Jesse Rutherford escorted a group of LCTs to Okinawa, arriving 15 September, after which she returned to the Philippines for patrol duty.

== Post-war decommissioning ==
The veteran destroyer escort embarked returning troops at Samar on 28 November 1945 and sailed that afternoon for San Diego, California, where she decommissioned on 21 June 1946. Jesse Rutherford was placed in the Pacific Reserve Fleet, Bremerton at Bremerton, Washington, where she remained until she was struck in January 1968 and sunk as target off California 8 December 1968.

== Awards ==
Jesse Rutherford received one battle star for World War II service.
