= USS Thaddeus Parker =

American World War II naval vessel

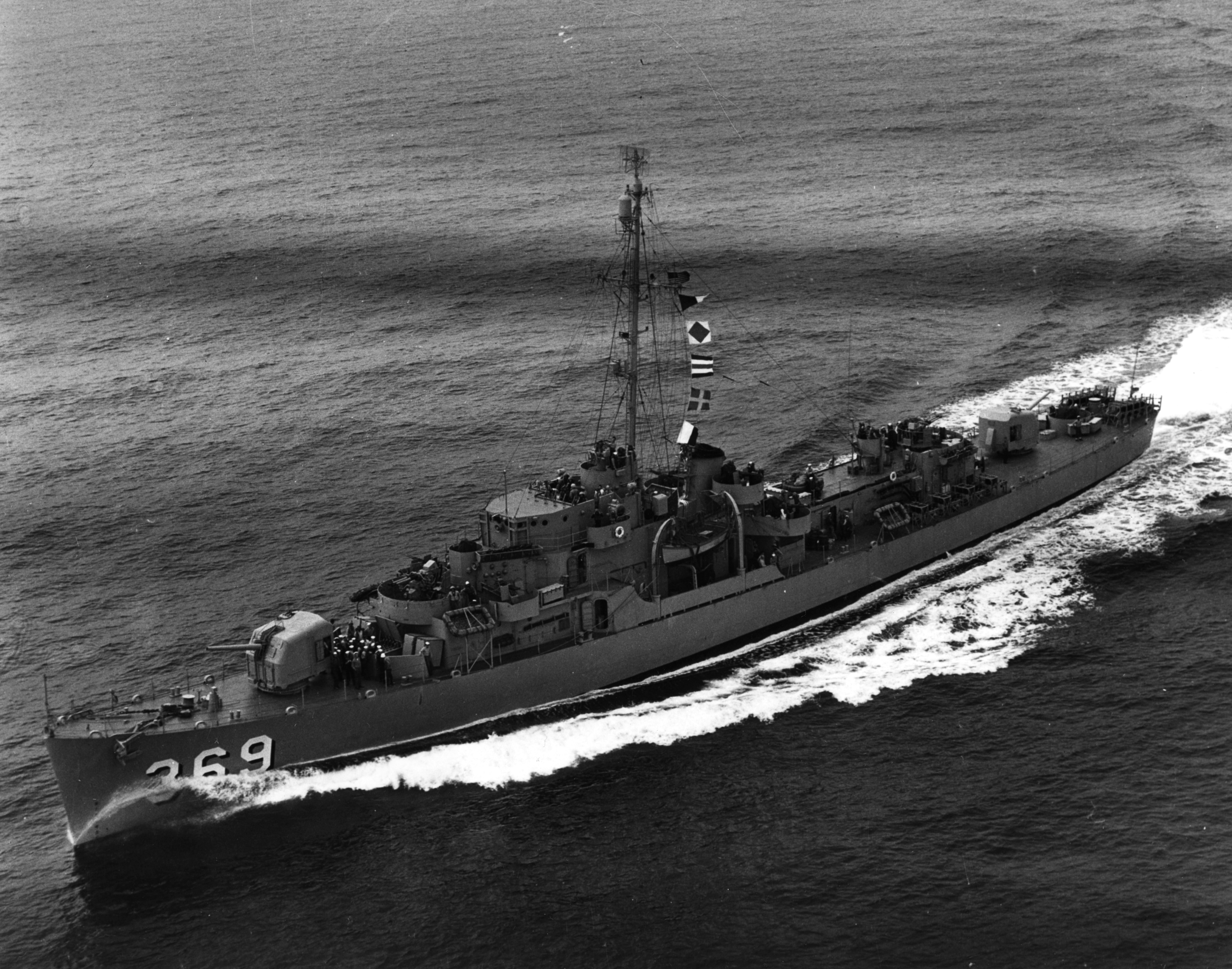
- USS Thaddeus Parker underway c. the 1950s

History

United States
- Name: Thaddeus Parker
- Namesake: Thaddeus Parker
- Builder: Consolidated Steel Corporation, Orange, Texas
- Laid down: 23 May 1944
- Launched: 26 August 1944
- Commissioned: 25 October 1944
- Decommissioned: 31 May 1946
- Recommissioned: 21 September 1951
- Decommissioned: 1 September 1967
- Stricken: 1 September 1967
- Fate: Sold for scrapping 9 July 1968

General characteristics
- Class & type: John C. Butler-class destroyer escort
- Displacement: 1,350 long tons (1,372 t)
- Length: 306 ft (93 m)
- Beam: 36 ft 8 in (11.18 m)
- Draft: 9 ft 5 in (2.87 m)
- Propulsion: 2 boilers, 2 geared turbine engines, 12,000 shp (8,900 kW); 2 propellers
- Speed: 24 knots (44 km/h)
- Range: 6,000 nmi (11,000 km) at 12 kn (22 km/h)
- Complement: 14 officers, 201 enlisted
- Armament: 2 × single 5 in (127 mm) guns; 2 × twin 40 mm (1.6 in) AA guns; 10 × single 20 mm (0.79 in) AA guns; 1 × triple 21 in (533 mm) torpedo tubes; 8 × depth charge throwers; 1 × Hedgehog ASW mortar; 2 × depth charge racks

USS Thaddeus Parker (DE-369) was a John C. Butler-class destroyer escort in service with the United States Navy from 1944 to 1946 and from 1951 to 1967. She was scrapped in 1968.

== Namesake ==
Thaddeus Parker was born on 13 November 1923 in Cross City, Florida. He enlisted in the United States Navy on 27 June 1941. Upon completion of basic training, he was assigned to the U.S. Naval Hospital, Norfolk, Virginia, as a Hospitalman Apprentice on 30 August. On 31 October 1941, he was stationed at the Marine Corps Base, Quantico, Virginia, where he served as a hospital corpsman in the U.S. Naval Hospital, and, after 29 March 1942, in the First Raider Battalion, Fleet Marine Force. He accompanied the Raider Battalion when that unit was ordered to the South Pacific. He was awarded the Navy Cross for heroism while serving as company corpsman during an engagement with enemy Japanese forces on Guadalcanal, Solomon Islands, on the night of 13/4 September 1942. He was killed in action at New Georgia, Solomon Islands, on 20 July 20, 1943. He was posthumously awarded the Purple Heart medal and the Silver Star Medal.

== History ==
The ship's keel was laid down on 23 May 1944 at Orange, Texas, by Consolidated Steel Corp. and the vessel was launched on 26 August 1944; sponsored by Miss Iva Lee Parker. The destroyer escort was commissioned on 25 October 1944.

=== World War II ===
Following shakedown training off Bermuda from 17 November to 16 December and yard work in Boston, Massachusetts, the new destroyer escort got underway on 29 December 1944 for the U.S. West Coast. She transited the Panama Canal on 7 January 1945 and arrived at San Diego, California.

Four days later, Thaddeus Parker headed for Hawaii as the escort for a troopship and reached Pearl Harbor on 26 January. On 5 February, the destroyer escort proceeded to Eniwetok. For the next two months, she escorted ships to Guam and Saipan. On 2 March, Thaddeus Parker departed Eniwetok with three other escorts and twelve troops transports that were loaded with marine replacements for battle casualties on Iwo Jima. She lay off that island for several days before being assigned to screening duties. The escort returned to Eniwetok on 25 March and, the following month, was ordered to Ulithi. On 12 May, she rendezvoused with a troop transport, south of the equator, and escorted it to the Palaus.

Thaddeus Parker was assigned to an antisubmarine screen in the vicinity of Peleliu and served as an air-sea rescue ship in Kossol Roads in the Palaus. She rescued a Marine pilot on 19 May and saved another on 18 July. On 27 June, she shelled enemy installations at the Koror Naval Base. The escort returned to Ulithi on 20 July and was assigned escort duty. She then made two voyages to Okinawa; the first, escorting a merchant convoy; the second, with the other ships of Escort Division 86.

=== End-of-war activity ===
Thaddeus Parker was at Okinawa when hostilities with Japan ceased; and she waited for almost a month before receiving orders on 11 September to proceed to Honshū, Japan. She was a unit of the southern Japan Occupation Forces from 14 September 1945 to 2 January 1946 when she began her return voyage to the United States. She was assigned to the 19th Fleet at San Diego, California, and was placed out of commission, in reserve, on 31 May 1946.

=== Cold War and fate ===
In March 1951, during the Korean War, Thaddeus Parker was removed from the Reserve Fleet and prepared for activation. She was recommissioned at San Diego on 21 September 1951. After shakedown training and post-shakedown repairs at the Mare Island Naval Shipyard, the ship returned to San Diego where she operated as a plane guard and participated in antisubmarine operations.

On 14 February, she and other reactivated ships sailed for the east coast to join the Atlantic Fleet. Newport, Rhode Island, was her new homeport. In the spring, she made a cruise to Bermuda and, later, escorted the escort carrier USS Block Island to the Caribbean for training. She then returned to Newport and remained in the Narragansett Bay area until November when she steamed to Guantanamo Bay for refresher training which she interrupted to return home to Newport for Christmas leave. She returned to Guantanamo in January 1953 to complete the training. in April and May, she provided services to the Training Command at Key West, Florida.

In June, the escort made a midshipman cruise to South America, visiting ports in Brazil, Colombia, and the British West Indies. After operations out of Newport, Thaddeus Parker made another midshipman cruise the following year. This one took her to Europe from 11 July to 3 September 1954 and included visits to ports in Scotland and France. The ship then operated along the Atlantic seaboard, from Brazil to Nova Scotia until 11 November 1957 when she was assigned duty as a Naval Reserve Training Ship at New York City.

Thaddeus Parker was activated for Cuban duty, operating off that island from 2 October 1961 to 1 August 1962, before returning to the Reserve fleet at Port Newark, New Jersey. On 1 September 1967, Thaddeus Parker was decommissioned for the last time and struck from the Navy list. She was sold on 9 July 1968 to Peck Iron and Metals Co., Portsmouth, Virginia, and scrapped.

== Awards ==
Thaddeus Parker received one battle star for World War II service.
