= USS Rolf =

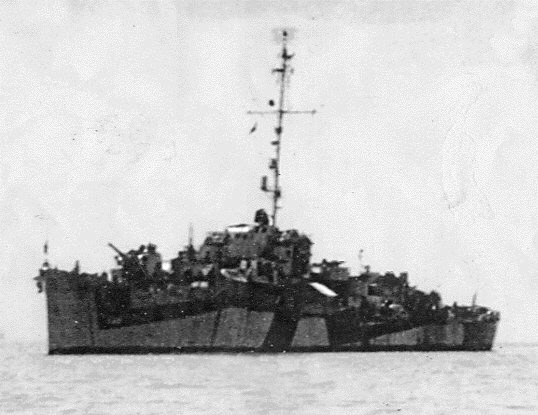
- USS Rolf (DE-362) on 7 September 1944

History

United States
- Name: Rolf
- Namesake: Robert Walter Rolf
- Builder: Consolidated Steel Corporation, Orange, Texas
- Laid down: 20 March 1944
- Launched: 23 May 1944
- Commissioned: 7 September 1944
- Decommissioned: 3 June 1946
- Stricken: 1 December 1972
- Identification: DE-362
- Fate: Sold for scrapping, 11 September 1973

General characteristics
- Class & type: John C. Butler-class destroyer escort
- Displacement: 1,350 long tons (1,372 t)
- Length: 306 ft (93 m)
- Beam: 36 ft 8 in (11.18 m)
- Draft: 9 ft 5 in (2.87 m)
- Propulsion: 2 boilers, 2 geared turbine engines, 12,000 shp (8,900 kW); 2 propellers
- Speed: 24 knots (44 km/h; 28 mph)
- Range: 6,000 nmi (11,000 km; 6,900 mi) at 12 kn (22 km/h; 14 mph)
- Complement: 14 officers, 201 enlisted
- Armament: 2 × single 5 in (127 mm) guns; 2 × twin 40 mm (1.6 in) AA guns; 10 × single 20 mm (0.79 in) AA guns; 1 × triple 21 in (533 mm) torpedo tubes; 8 × depth charge throwers; 1 × Hedgehog ASW mortar; 2 × depth charge racks

USS Rolf (DE-362) was a John C. Butler-class destroyer escort in service with the United States Navy from 1944 to 1946. She was scrapped in 1973.

== Namesake ==
Robert Walter Rolf was born on 26 August 1914 in Rock Island, Illinois. He attended Augustana College in his hometown before enlisting in the U.S. Naval Reserve at Chicago, Illinois on 5 August 1941. He began his training at the U.S. Naval Academy on 9 January 1942, accepted appointment as midshipman, USNR, on 9 February, and was promoted to ensign on 5 May. After duty at San Diego, California, further training at Purdue University, Lafayette, Indiana, and assignments at the Norfolk Naval Base and Consolidated Steel Corp., Orange, Texas, he was promoted to lieutenant, junior grade. He was appointed commanding officer of an LCI(L) effective 12 June 1942.

He was killed in a Japanese bombing raid on 6 September during the Landing at Lae, New Guinea. He was posthumously awarded the Navy Cross.

== History ==
USS Rolf was named in honor of Robert Walter Rolf who was awarded the Navy Cross for his actions at New Guinea. The ship's keel was laid down on 20 March 1944 by Consolidated Steel Corp. at their yard in Orange, Texas. The ship was launched on 23 May 1944, sponsored by Mrs. Martha M. Rolf, mother of the ship's namesake. The warship was commissioned on 7 September 1944.

Following shakedown off Bermuda, she departed Norfolk, Virginia on 30 November and reached San Diego, California on 5 December. Rolf then sailed for the southwest Pacific Ocean and escorted a convoy from Hollandia, New Guinea, to Leyte Gulf. The ship subsequently operated under the Philippine Sea Frontier, and from May to August was part of a hunter-killer group at Subic Bay, Philippine Islands. Just prior to the close of hostilities, Rolf participated in a search for enemy midget submarines believed to be operating northeast of Casiguran Bay, Luzon.

Following the Japanese surrender, the destroyer escort sailed with a task group via Okinawa to Jinsen, Korea, for operations in support of the Korean occupation. She later took part in the occupation of China. Rolf decommissioned on 3 June 1946 and entered the Pacific Reserve Fleet at San Diego, California, where she remained until stricken from the Navy list 1 December 1972. She was sold for scrap on 11 September 1973 and broken up.
