= USS Rombach =

American military seaship

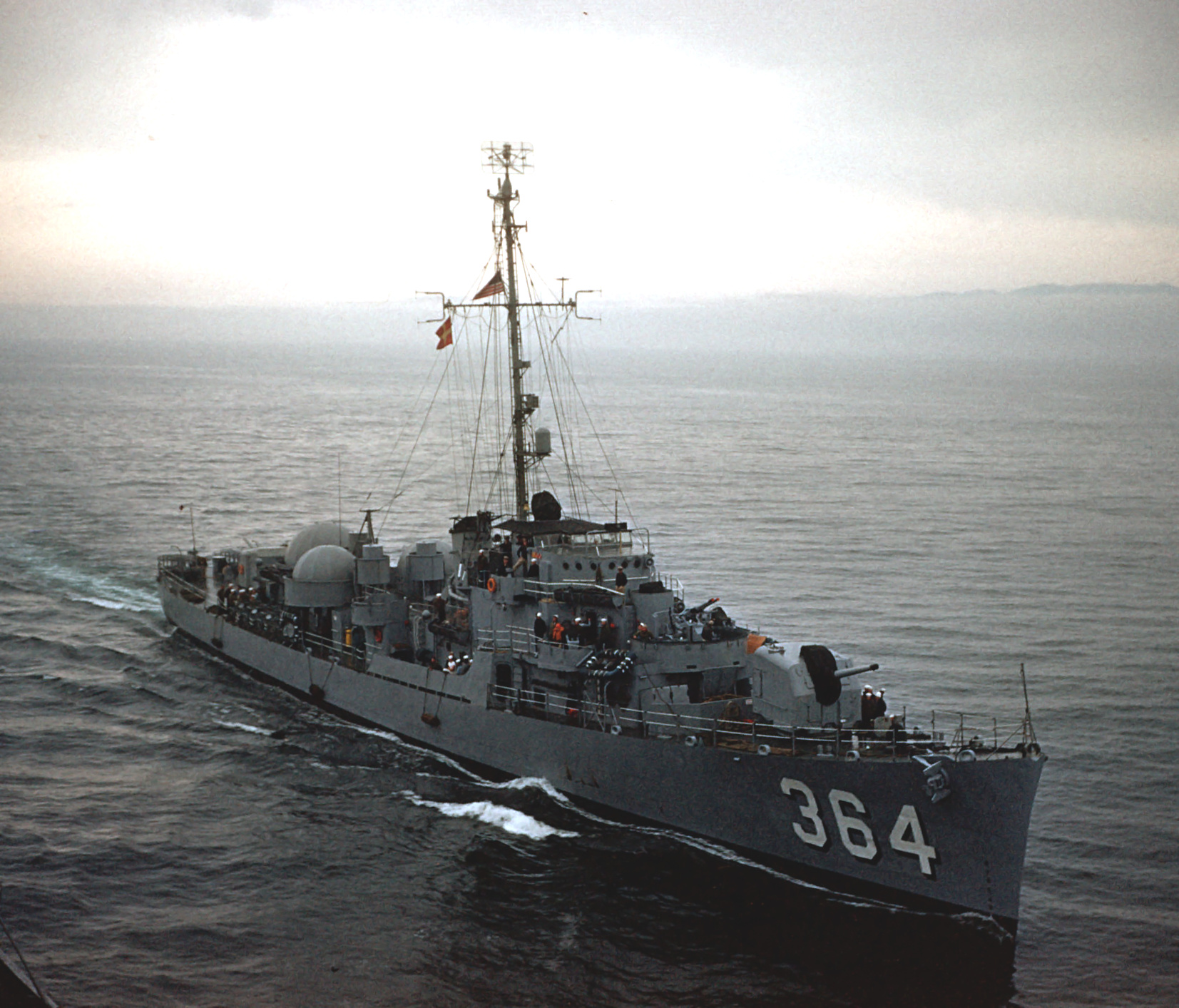
- USS Rombach underway in the Pacific Ocean

History

United States
- Name: Rombach
- Namesake: Severin Louis Rombach
- Builder: Consolidated Steel Corporation, Orange, Texas
- Laid down: 10 April 1944
- Launched: 6 June 1944
- Commissioned: 20 September 1944
- Decommissioned: 9 January 1958
- Stricken: 1 March 1972
- Fate: Sold for scrapping 19 December 1972

General characteristics
- Class & type: John C. Butler-class destroyer escort
- Displacement: 1,350 long tons (1,372 t)
- Length: 306 ft (93 m)
- Beam: 36 ft 8 in (11.18 m)
- Draft: 9 ft 5 in (2.87 m)
- Propulsion: 2 boilers, 2 geared turbine engines, 12,000 shp (8,900 kW); 2 propellers
- Speed: 24 knots (44 km/h)
- Range: 6,000 nmi (11,000 km) at 12 kn (22 km/h)
- Complement: 14 officers, 201 enlisted
- Armament: 2 × single 5 in (127 mm) guns; 2 × twin 40 mm (1.6 in) AA guns; 10 × single 20 mm (0.79 in) AA guns; 1 × triple 21 in (533 mm) torpedo tubes; 8 × depth charge throwers; 1 × Hedgehog ASW mortar; 2 × depth charge racks

USS Rombach (DE-364) was a John C. Butler-class destroyer escort acquired by the U.S. Navy during World War II. The primary purpose of the destroyer escort was to escort and protect ships in convoy, in addition to other tasks as assigned, such as patrol or radar picket.

== Namesake ==
Severin Louis Rombach was born on 26 November 1914 in Cleveland, Ohio. He attended Ohio University, where he earned a B.A. in commerce. While a student at Ohio, he was a member of the German club and a manager for the football team. He enlisted in the Naval Reserve at Grosse Ile, Michigan on 5 May 1939. He was appointed aviation cadet on 21 September 1939 and was designated naval aviator on 10 May 1940. On 12 June 1940, he was promoted to ensign, and shortly thereafter he was assigned to USS Enterprise for duty flying with Torpedo Squadron 6. He was promoted to Lieutenant (junior grade) on 28 May 1942.

He was reported missing in action on 4 June 1942, after his plane had been hit in the Battle of Midway. He was posthumously awarded the Navy Cross.

== Construction and commissioning ==
The ship's keel was laid down on 20 March 1944 by Consolidated Steel Corp. at their yard in Orange, Texas. The vessel was launched on 6 June 1944, sponsored by Mrs. Severin L. Rombach, widow of Lieutenant (junior grade) Rombach and commissioned on 20 September 1944.

== Operational history ==
=== World War II Pacific Theatre operations ===
Following shakedown off Bermuda, she departed Boston, Massachusetts, 29 November and arrived at Manus, Admiralty Islands, 7 January 1945. From 24 January to 2 March, Rombach escorted convoys between Hollandia, New Guinea, and Leyte Gulf, Philippine Islands. Then she served in the Manila Bay area, Luzon, Philippine Islands. Beginning 26 April, Rombach spent a month with the Local Naval Defense Force, Lingayen Gulf, Luzon, Philippine Islands.

She resumed operations with her escort division from 27 May to 8 August, operating in a hunter-killer group off the western coast of Luzon. Rombach next served as part of a carrier hunter-killer group patrolling the Leyte-Okinawa convoy routes north of Luzon until after the cessation of hostilities, 14 August 1945.

=== End-of-war activity ===
Employed in air-sea rescue operations during the latter part of August, Rombach was engaged in occupational landings on 5 September at Jinsen, Korea; on 1 October at Taku, China, and on 5 October at Qingdao. She then served with the "Magic Carpet" fleet from 8 October to 22 November escorting transports to East China ports where servicemen were embarked for return to the United States.

=== Post-war Naval Reserve training assignment ===
In July 1946 Rombach was assigned to the Pacific Reserve Fleet at Seattle, Washington, for the training of Naval Reserves. In addition to regular training duties for Reservists of the 13th Naval District, Rombach participated in PhibPac exercises in 1952 and 1953 and spent eight weeks each year from 1952 to 1957 as a school ship at the Fleet Sonar School, San Diego, California.

=== Final decommissioning ===
On 9 January 1958 she decommissioned at Bremerton, Washington, where she remained until 1 March 1972. At that time she was stricken from the Navy list after an INSURV inspection team determined her unfit for further service. On 19 December 1972 she was sold for scrapping.
