= John Butler =

John Butler may refer to:

== Arts and entertainment ==
- John "Picayune" Butler (died 1864), American banjo performer; may have been used by a number of performers
- John Butler (artist) (1890–1976), American artist
- John Butler (author) (born 1937), British author and YouTuber
- John Butler (born 1954), member of Diesel Park West
- John Butler (director) (born 1972), Irish screenwriter, director and novelist
- John Butler (musician) (born 1975), Australian musician
  - John Butler Trio, his jam band
  - John Butler (album), its 1998 album
- John Butler (Doctors), a fictional character from Doctors

== Military ==
- John Butler (Irish Confederate), officer of the Irish Confederate Army of the 1640s
- John Butler (Ranger) (1728–1796), American-born military officer
- John Butler (general) (died 1786), brigadier general of militia in North Carolina during the American Revolutionary War
- John A. Butler (1910–1945), U.S. Marine Corps officer and Navy Cross recipient
- John Fitzhardinge Paul Butler (1888–1916), English soldier and Victoria Cross recipient
- John Clarence Butler (1921–1942), U.S. naval aviator
  - USS John C. Butler, a ship named in his honor
- John G. Butler (inventor), 19th century officer in the U.S. Army Ordnance Corps who developed better shot for rifled cannon

== Nobility ==
- John Butler of Clonamicklon (died 1330), youngest son of Edmund Butler, Earl of Carrick
- John Butler, 6th Earl of Ormond (died 1476)
- John Butler of Kilcash (died 1570), third son of James Butler, 9th Earl of Ormond
- John Butler, 1st Earl of Gowran (1643–1677), seventh son of James Butler, 1st Duke of Ormonde
- John Butler, 12th Baron Dunboyne (1731–1800), Irish clergyman and aristocrat, Roman Catholic Bishop of Cork
- John Butler, 17th Earl of Ormonde (1740–1795), Irish peer and Member of Parliament
- John Butler, 2nd Marquess of Ormonde (1808–1854), Irish politician and peer
- John Butler, 15th Earl of Ormonde (before 1744–1766)

== Politics ==
- John Butler (MP for Kent) (c. 1370–c. 1420)
- John Butler (died 1423), MP for London
- John Butler (died 1572 or 1573) (1503/04–1572/73), MP for Warwick
- John Butler (died 1576) (1511/14–1576), MP for Hertfordshire
- John Butler (died 1613), MP for Maldon
- John Butler (Nova Scotia politician) (died 1791)
- John Washington Butler (1875–1952), U.S. Representative for Tennessee
- John Cornelius Butler (1887–1953), U.S. Congressman from New York
- John Butler (Irish politician) (1891–1968), Irish Labour party politician from Waterford; member of the 4th Dáil
- John Marshall Butler (1897–1978), American politician in Maryland
- John D. Butler (1915–2010), American Republican politician and mayor of San Diego
- John Edward Butler (1916–1999), member of the Legislative Assembly of Alberta from 1975 to 1979
- John E. Butler, American politician, lawyer, and newspaper editor from Maine

== Religion ==
- John Butler (Jesuit) (1727–1786), Jesuit priest
- John Butler (priest) (died 1682), Canon of Windsor
- John Butler (bishop) (1717–1802), bishop of Oxford
- John Gare Butler (1781–1841), clergyman of New Zealand
- John Jay Butler (1814–1891), ordained minister and professor of systematic theology
- John George Butler (1826–1909), Lutheran clergyman; Chaplain of the U.S. Senate and House of Representatives
- John Joseph Butler (1883–1966), Catholic priest
- John T. Butler, President of Boston College as of 2026

== Sports ==
=== American football ===
- John Butler (American football coach) (born 1973), American football assistant coach since the 1990s
- John Butler (American football executive) (1946–2003), general manager in the National Football League
- John Butler (defensive back) (born 1965), National Football League player with the San Francisco 49ers
- Johnny Butler (running back) (1918–1963), National Football League player from 1942 to 1945

=== Association football ===
- John Butler (footballer, born 1937) (1937–2010), English footballer
- John Butler (footballer, born 1962), English footballer
- John Butler (footballer, born 1969), Scottish footballer

=== Other sports ===
- John Butler (cricketer) (1863–1945), English cricketer
- John Butler (athlete) (1871–1959), British Olympic athlete
- John Butler (baseball) (1879–1950), catcher in Major League Baseball from 1901 to 1907
- John Butler Jr. (born 2002), American basketball player
- Johnny Butler (1893–1967), baseball player
- John Butler (rugby league) (born 1949), English rugby league footballer
- John Butler, rider in the 1847 Grand National steeplechase

== Other fields ==
- John Butler (architect) (1828–1900), British architect
- John O. Butler, American dentist and periodontist
- John M. Butler (scientist) (born 1969), expert on forensic DNA typing
- John Alfred Valentine Butler (1899–1977), English physical chemist
- John Dixon Butler (1860–1920), British architect
- John Butler (1884–1967), actor in The Yellow Cab Man
- John S. Butler, founding member of the American Psychiatric Association

== See also ==
- Butler dynasty
- Jack Butler (disambiguation)
- John Boteler (disambiguation)
- John Butler Smith (1838–1914), American manufacturer and politician
- Jonathan Butler (born 1961), South African singer-songwriter
