= Jack Butler =

Jack Butler may refer to:

- Jack Butler (American football) (1927–2013), American football player
- Jack Butler (artist) (1937–2024), American-Canadian artist
- Jack Butler (author) (born 1944), American author
- Jack Butler (footballer, born 1868) (1868–1956), Chirk F.C. and Wales international footballer
- Jack Butler (racewalker) (1870–1959), British Olympic athlete
- Jack Butler (footballer, born 1885) (1885–?), English football fullback for Grimsby Town and Plymouth Argyle
- Jack Butler (footballer, born 1894) (1894–1961), English football player and manager
- Jack Butler (Jiwarli) (1901–1986), last native speaker of Jiwarli
- Jack Butler Yeats (1871–1957), Irish artist
- Jackie Butler (born 1985), American basketball player
- Jacques Butler, American jazz musician

== See also ==
- John Butler (disambiguation)
