= USS O'Flaherty =

John C. Butler-class destroyer

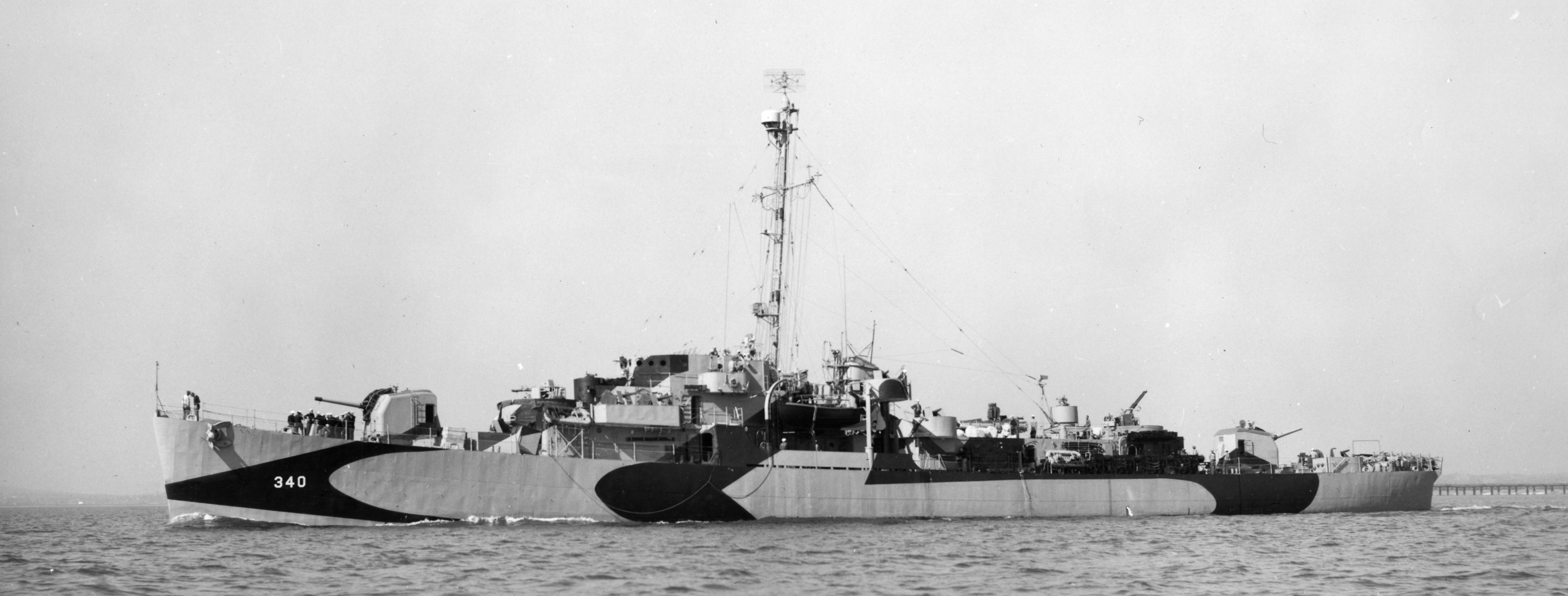
- USS O'Flaherty off Boston, 8 June 1944

History

United States
- Name: O'Flaherty
- Namesake: Frank Woodrow O'Flaherty
- Builder: Consolidated Steel Corporation, Orange, Texas
- Laid down: 4 October 1943
- Launched: 14 December 1943
- Commissioned: 8 April 1944
- Decommissioned: January 1947
- Stricken: 1 December 1972
- Fate: Sold for scrap, 27 November 1973

General characteristics
- Class & type: John C. Butler-class destroyer escort
- Displacement: 1,350 long tons (1,372 t) (standard); 1,745 long tons (1,773 t) (full load)
- Length: 306 ft (93.3 m) (o/a)
- Beam: 36 ft 10 in (11.2 m)
- Draft: 13 ft 4 in (4.1 m)
- Installed power: 2 boilers; 12,000 shp (8,900 kW)
- Propulsion: 2 propellers; 2 geared steam turbines
- Speed: 24 knots (44 km/h; 28 mph)
- Range: 6,000 nmi (11,000 km; 6,900 mi) at 12 knots (22 km/h; 14 mph)
- Complement: 14 officers and 201 enlisted men
- Sensors & processing systems: SL surface search radar; SA series air search radar; QC series sonar
- Armament: 2 × single 5 in (127 mm) guns; 2 × twin 40 mm (1.6 in) AA guns; 10 × single 20 mm (0.79 in) AA guns; 1 × triple 21 in (533 mm) torpedo tubes; 8 × depth charge throwers; 1 × Hedgehog ASW mortar; 2 × depth charge racks

USS O'Flaherty (DE-340) was a John C. Butler-class destroyer escort built for the United States Navy during World War II. She was named for Ensign Frank Woodrow O'Flaherty, a pilot who posthumously received the Navy Cross for his actions at the Battle of Midway.

Laid down in October 1943, launched in December of that year, and commissioned almost four months later, O'Flaherty served on convoy escort duty in the Pacific from August 1944. She operated out of Pearl Harbor in the eastern Pacific during November and December, initially with a hunter-killer group. During the first half of 1945, O'Flaherty protected escort carriers in the invasion of Lingayen Gulf, the Battle of Iwo Jima, and the Battle of Okinawa, which occurred in rapid succession. In the final months of the war in the Pacific, she returned to convoy escort duty. Decommissioned postwar, O'Flaherty spent more than twenty years in the Pacific Reserve Fleet before being sold for scrap in the early 1970s.

== Design ==
The John C. Butler-class destroyer escorts were designed to meet a need for large numbers of cheap anti-submarine escort ships for ocean convoys, and as a result carried little anti-surface armament. The class was part of an initial requirement for 720 escorts to be completed by the end of 1944, which was significantly reduced.

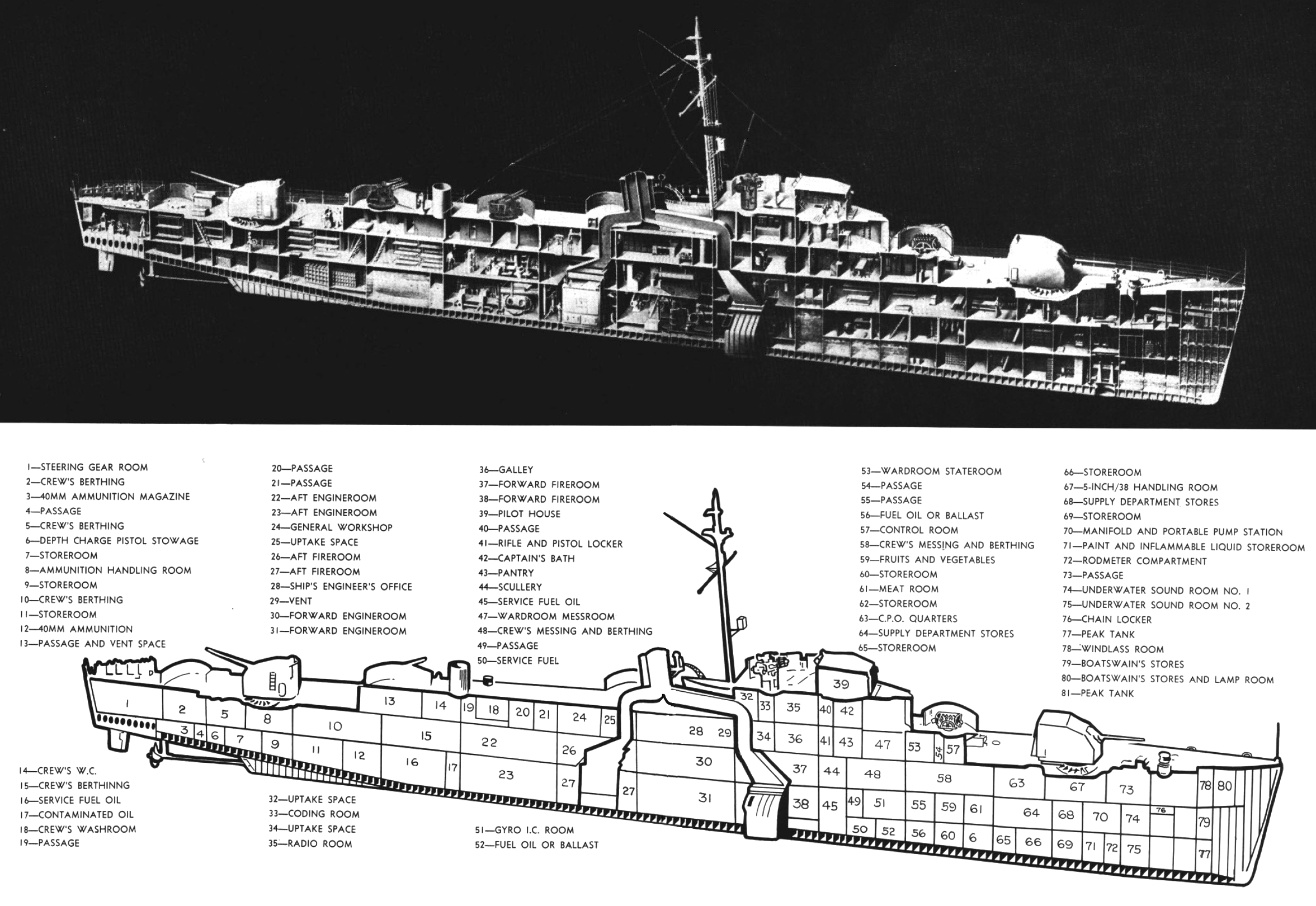
A United States Navy diagram of a destroyer escort

O'Flaherty was 306 feet (93.3 m) long overall with a beam of 36 feet 10 inches (11.2 m) and a draft of 13 feet 4 inches (4.1 m). She displaced 1,350 long tons (1,372 t) standard and 1,745 long tons (1,773 t) full load, with a complement of 14 officers and 201 enlisted men.

The ship was propelled by two Westinghouse geared steam turbines powered by two "D" Express boilers, which created 12,000 shaft horsepower (8,900 kW) for a designed maximum speed of 24 knots (44 km/h; 28 mph). She had a range of 6,000 nautical miles (11,000 km; 6,900 mi) at 12 knots (22 km/h; 14 mph).

=== Armament and sensors ===
O'Flaherty mounted a main battery of two single turret-mounted 5-inch/38 caliber guns, one forward and one aft of the superstructure, to protect against surface and aerial threats, directed by the Mark 51 Gunnery Fire-Control System. In addition, she mounted two twin 40 mm Bofors anti-aircraft (AA) guns, superfiring over the 5-inch guns, and ten single 20 mm Oerlikon AA cannon, also controlled by the Mark 51 fire-control system. Equipped with triple-mounted 21-inch (533 mm) torpedo tubes, the ship also carried two depth charge racks, eight K-gun depth-charge throwers and one Hedgehog spigot mortar as anti-submarine weapons. She was equipped with QC series sonar, SL surface search radar, and SA series air search radar.

== Construction and service ==
=== Construction, shakedown, and initial Pacific operations ===
Laid down by the Consolidated Steel Corporation of Orange, Texas, on 4 October 1943, O'Flaherty (DE-340) was launched on 14 December of that year, sponsored by the sister of her namesake, Ensign Frank Woodrow O'Flaherty, a pilot who posthumously received the Navy Cross for his actions at the Battle of Midway, where he was captured and killed by the Japanese. The ship was commissioned on 8 April 1944. Following commissioning, she received supplies, ammunition, and fuel at the Orange City Docks, followed by gunnery testing off Sabine Pass. Throughout the month O'Flaherty completed her fitting out at the Todd Galveston Dry Docks, and was depermed before sailing for Bermuda on 25 April. After arrival, the ship undertook a shakedown cruise off the island for most of May, attached to the Atlantic Fleet.

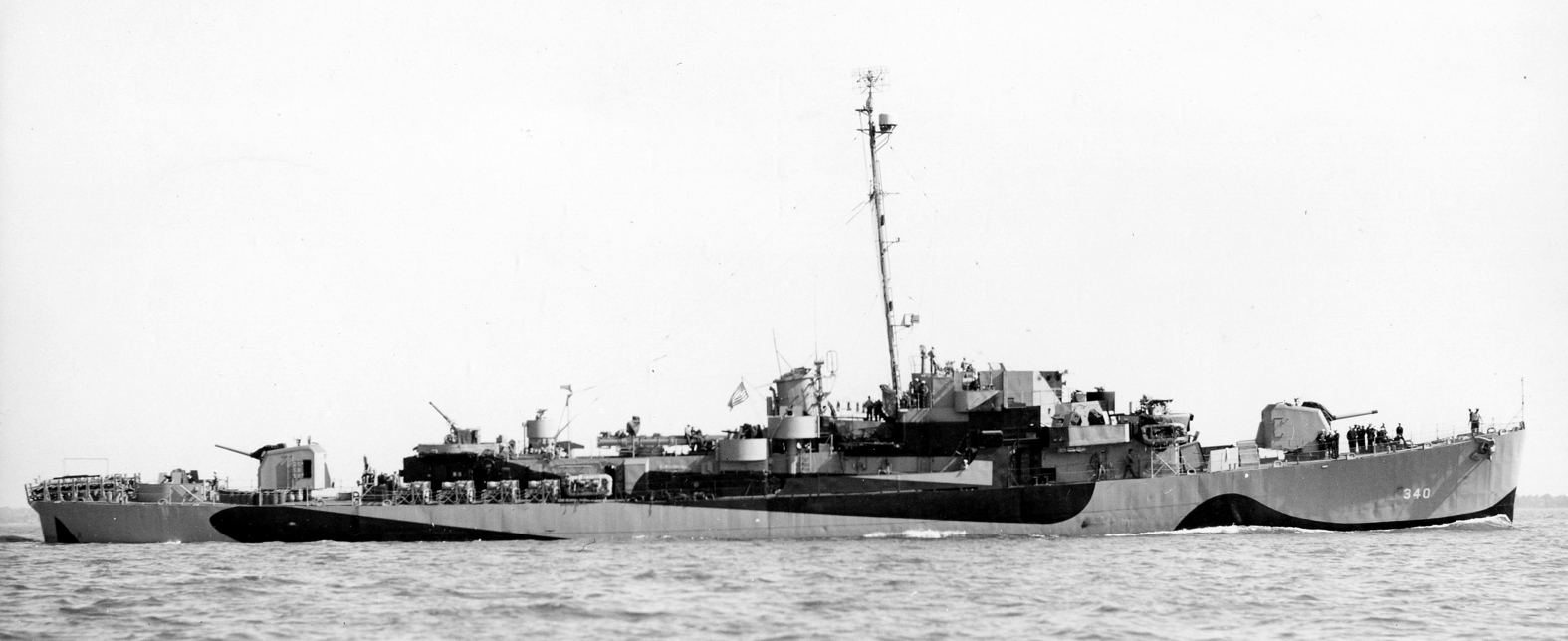
O'Flaherty in Boston on 8 June 1944, viewed from the starboard side

For repairs to correct deficiencies found during her shakedown, O'Flaherty was ordered to the Boston Navy Yard. In early June, she sailed to Norfolk to become part of the screen for the battleship New York, which was operating on training cruises for US Naval Academy midshipmen. The ship escorted New York until reaching Trinidad, from which it departed on 20 June for the Panama Canal in company with sister ship Jack Miller. After transiting the canal three days later, the two destroyer escorts joined the Pacific Fleet and continued to Pearl Harbor following a stopover at San Diego. Arriving at Pearl Harbor on 12 July, she screened the escort carrier Rudyerd Bay on a voyage to Majuro from 20 to 26 July. After arriving at Majuro, O'Flaherty continued to Tarawa, from which she escorted the troopship Sea Fiddler to Eniwetok at the end of the month.

=== Guam and Eniwetok convoy escort duty ===
Departing Eniwetok for Guam at the beginning of August, O'Flaherty screened the escort carrier Santee to Guam, where the latter flew her air group ashore on 4 August to assist in the retaking of the island. For the next four days, the ship operated as part of the screen for attack transports during the night and patrolled in the anti-submarine screen. At the end of this period she departed for Eniwetok as escort to the repair ship Grapple, arriving there on 12 August. Six days later, O'Flaherty left Eniwetok as escort to a convoy of tankers bound for Manus in the Admiralty Islands, which arrived at its destination on 28 August. Returning to Eniwetok on 2 September, she departed for Manus again on an eight-day voyage, this time screening the destroyer tender Piedmont and the ammunition ship Lassen.

Returning to Eniwetok, O'Flaherty departed again on 19 September as escort for the Guadalcanal-bound oiler Ashtabula and the merchantman Polau Laut, but two days later swapped convoys with another set of escorts midocean. The ship turned around and escorted the stores ship Talita and net cargo ship Zebra back to Eniwetok, arriving on 24 September. She spent the rest of the month and the first days of October anchored there for repairs and replenishment. Beginning at midnight on 2/3 October, O'Flaherty steamed 600 miles (970 km) to rescue the survivors of a crashed PBM Mariner flying boat from Patrol Bombing Squadron 21, picking up the entire crew with the assistance of patrol aircraft on 4 October. Back at Eniwetok, she soon departed for Guadalcanal, escorting the troopship SS Alcoa Polaris, but was replaced by another destroyer escort and diverted to Manus en route. Departing Manus on 12 October as the escort for the Majuro-bound escort carrier Hollandia, the ship steamed back to Eniwetok after completing the mission and was sent to Pearl Harbor via Majuro.

=== Hunter-killer operations and Lingayen Gulf ===
Arriving on 26 October, O'Flaherty received new combat information center equipment and became part of a hunter-killer group built around the escort carrier Corregidor to investigate reports of Japanese submarine activity in the Pacific between Hawaii and the west coast. She became flagship of Escort Division (CortDiv) 64 at the end of the month, and spent much of November patrolling with the hunter-killer group, although no submarines were spotted. The ship picked up the crew of a TBM Avenger torpedo bomber from Corregidor that crashed in a night landing attempt on 16 November, although one crewman died of his injuries aboard O'Flaherty. The hunter-killer group was dissolved upon return to Pearl Harbor on 19 November and she spent the rest of the month and the beginning of December at anchor for routine maintenance.

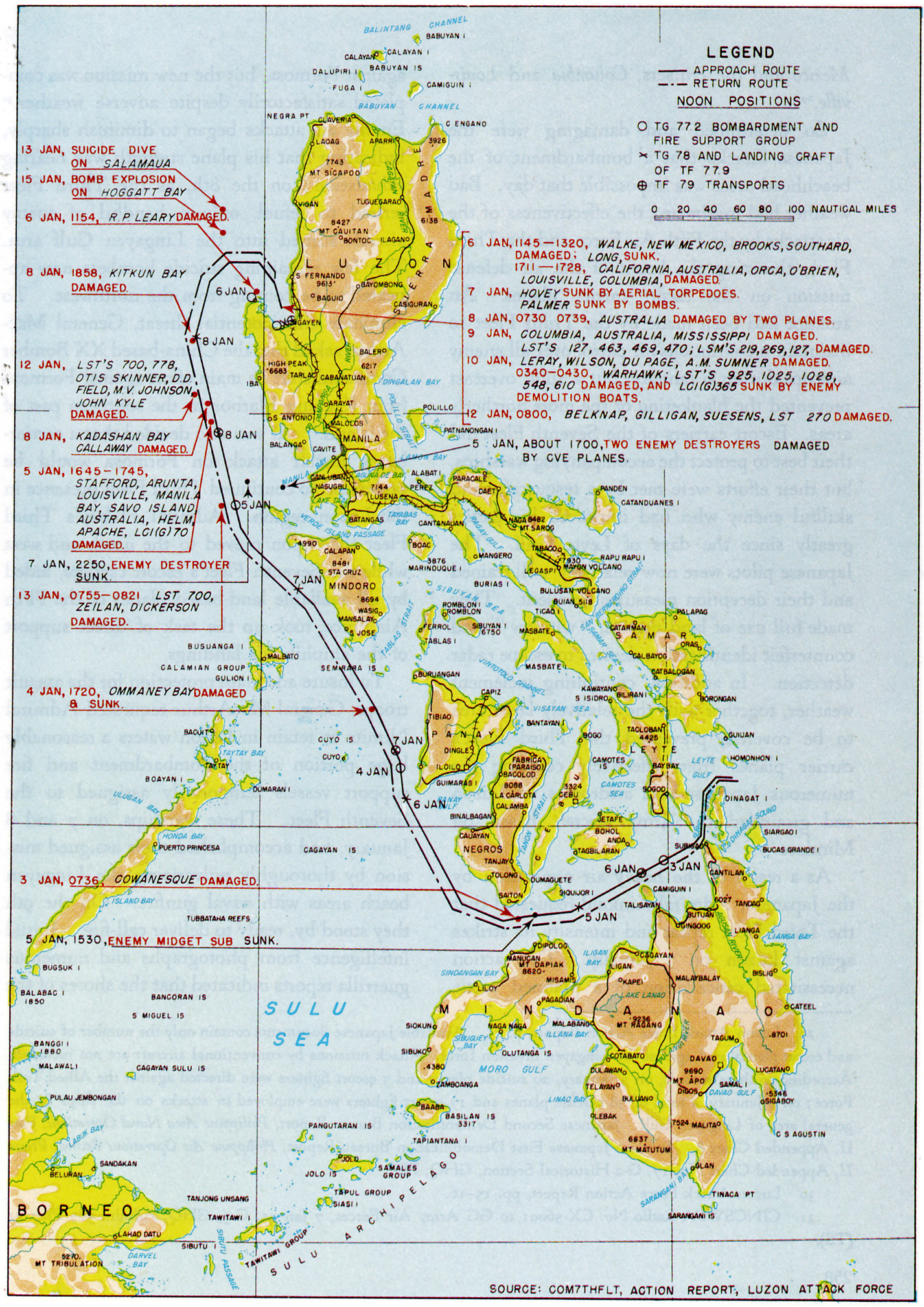
The approach to Lingayen Gulf, January 1945

O'Flaherty screened the escort carrier Makassar Strait while the latter conducted flight training operations off Pearl Harbor between 6 and 10 December. She picked up one pilot who crashed after takeoff from the carrier, and after her return to Pearl Harbor the commander of CortDiv 64 moved to another destroyer escort. After anti-submarine exercises with the submarine S-46 on 12–13 December the ship departed for Manus on 15 December as part of the screen for the escort carrier Wake Island. Arriving there on 26 December, O'Flaherty joined Task Unit 77.4.3, commanded by Rear Admiral Ralph Ofstie, which provided air cover to Task Force 79 (the Lingayen Attack Force) of the Seventh Fleet for the invasion of Lingayen Gulf. She departed on 31 December as part of the screen for the task unit, centered around the escort carriers Kitkun Bay and Shamrock Bay. The ship made an unsuccessful search for downed aviators from Kitkun Bay on 5 January 1945.

As they approached Lingayen, Task Force 79 and O'Flaherty's task unit became the target of kamikaze raids. On the morning of 8 January, the ship fired a single 5-inch AA round against a Japanese aircraft approaching the nearby Task Group 79.1, her first shot in a combat operation. She ceased fire to avoid hitting pursuing American fighters, which drove off the attacker. Just after sunset, O'Flaherty put up AA fire against a lone kamikaze that crashed into Kitkun Bay, taking the escort carrier out of the fight. The ship fired further rounds against high-flying Japanese aircraft as she moved to screen the escorts assisting Kitkun Bay, and rescued a Kitkun Bay sailor from the water. She continued to screen the escort carrier and sent boats to return Kitkun Bay personnel taken off by other escorts to the carrier after she regained power on the next day.

O'Flaherty was sent to escort the escort carriers of Task Unit 77.4.2 (commanded by Rear Admiral Felix Stump) as they provided air support for the Lingayen landings on 11 January while Kitkun Bay headed to the continental United States for repairs. On 17 January she headed back to Ulithi as part of the screen for several escort carriers after the beachhead was secured, conducting an unsuccessful search for a man overboard off the escort carrier Lunga Point on the next day before arriving at her destination on 23 January. O'Flaherty resupplied at Ulithi, and while there Farnham was replaced by Lieutenant Commander Paul L. Callan on 30 January. In preparation for the invasion of Iwo Jima, she participated in rehearsals for the landings on islands east of Ulithi on 3 and 6 February, as part of the anti-submarine screen.

=== Iwo Jima ===
On 10 February, Rear Admiral Calvin Durgin's Support Carrier Group (Task Group 52.2), of the Amphibious Support Force (Task Force 52) of the Fifth Fleet departed Ulithi. O'Flaherty was included in the screen for Rear Admiral Clifton Sprague's Task Unit 52.2.1, centered around five escort carriers – Natoma Bay, Petrof Bay, Sargent Bay, Steamer Bay, and Wake Island. The screen also included the destroyer Ralph Talbot and the destroyer escorts Richard S. Bull, Richard M. Rowell and Grady. The Task Group reached Saipan on 12 February, where final rehearsals were conducted and O'Flaherty briefly detached to Task Unit 52.2.2 on the next day before returning to Task Unit 52.2.1 on 14 February, as the latter steamed towards Iwo Jima together with the shore bombardment force. They took station off Iwo Jima late on 15 February before the escort carriers began launching pre-landing strikes against Japanese positions on it and the Bonin Islands on the morning of the next day.

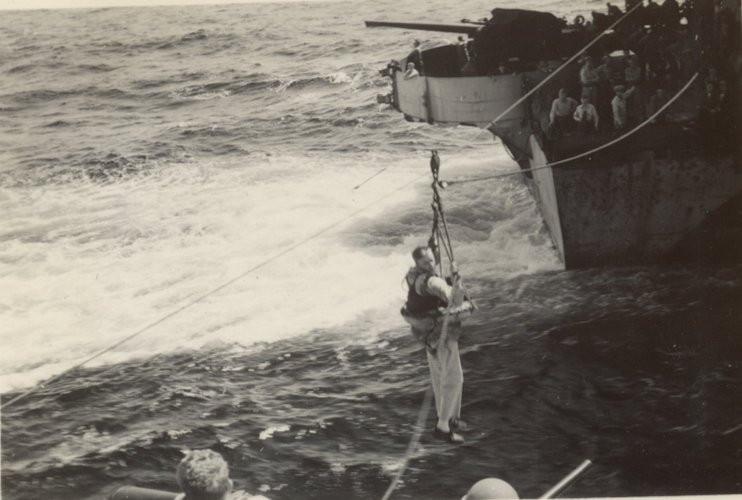
A rescued pilot being transferred from O'Flaherty to an escort carrier via breeches buoy

Following three days of airstrikes and naval bombardment, the invasion of Iwo Jima began on 19 February. That morning, O'Flaherty expended 541 shells from her 5-inch and AA guns in a failed attempt to sink a naval mine. Later in the day, she picked up the pilot of a crashed FM-2 Wildcat from the escort carrier Anzio. Continuing on screen duty as the escort carrier air groups supported the American advance on the island, the ship transferred the downed aviator to Natoma Bay on 21 February and was detached with Wake Island, Petrof Bay, Grady, and the destroyer Halligan to join Task Units 52.2.2 and 52.2.3 after the fleet carrier Saratoga was knocked out of action by kamikaze attacks. She returned to Task Unit 52.2.1 on 23 February, and remained off Iwo Jima on 8 March with Task Unit 52.2.3 (centered around the escort carriers Wake Island, Saginaw Bay and Tulagi) when Task Unit 52.2.1 departed for Ulithi, as airfields were opened on Iwo Jima for army aircraft that replaced those of the escort carriers in support of the troops. O'Flaherty followed with Task Unit 52.2.3, the last of the escort carriers to leave Iwo Jima, on 11 March, returning to Ulithi three days later. Although many ships were sunk or damaged during the Iwo Jima operation, O'Flaherty escaped unscathed.

=== Okinawa ===
The period of rest for the crew of O'Flaherty at Ulithi proved brief; on 21 March she departed for the invasion of Okinawa with the Support Carrier Group. The ship continued as one of the nine destroyer escorts and five destroyers forming the screen for Task Unit 52.1.1, which now centered around seven escort carriers – Makin Island, Fanshaw Bay, Lunga Point, Natoma Bay, Savo Island, Steamer Bay, and Anzio. The task unit arrived off Okinawa on 25 March and the escort carriers began launching strikes against the island before the beginning of the landings on 1 April; O'Flaherty would remain in the vicinity of the island for more than a month. Transferred to screen Task Unit 52.1.2, which included the escort carriers Marcus Island, Petrof Bay, Saginaw Bay, Wake Island, Tulagi, and Rudyerd Bay, on 31 March, she put into Kerama Retto with Saginaw Bay on 2 April for refueling. While anchored that morning, O'Flaherty contributed with her aft 40 mm guns to flak that helped shoot down a diving Japanese A6M Zero.

Task Unit 52.1.2 was targeted by kamikaze raids in the late afternoon of 3 April. Two aircraft dived on Wake Island, both of which crashed into the water near the carrier. The explosion of one of the aircraft holed the hull of Wake Island, taking her out of action for repairs. A third narrowly missed the screening destroyer Capps, and O'Flaherty opened 5-inch fire on a fourth heading for Capps, which was shot down by the combat air patrol. On the first day of the Kikusui massed kamikaze attacks, 6 April, the ship was berthed close to Tulagi in Kerama Retto when nearby LST-447 was sunk by a kamikaze. She continued screening Task Unit 52.1.2 off Okinawa and continued this mission on 15 April when the task unit moved off the Sakishima Islands to launch strikes against Japanese airfields there. After the task unit returned to strikes against Okinawa, O'Flaherty was detached with Anzio to Task Unit 52.1.1 on 17 April, but the ship returned to Task Unit 52.1.2 two days later. She experienced heavy vibrations on 24 April and depth charged a false contact on the next day. As land-based aircraft took over support duties at Okinawa, O'Flaherty departed for repairs to Guam on 29 April with Saginaw Bay and Savo Island.

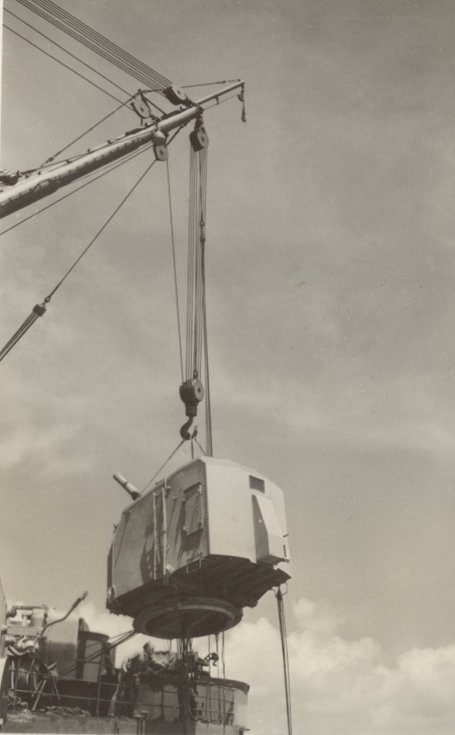
Oberrender's 5-inch gun being transferred to O'Flaherty by the destroyer tender Cascade

After arriving at Apra Harbor on Guam on 3 May, O'Flaherty was forced to remain there by damage to one of her shafts, while her crew rested. She was drydocked on ARD-26 between 4 and 8 June for the necessary repairs, and on 9 June departed with the escort carriers Manila Bay and Shipley Bay to join Task Force 32 of the Third Fleet (the former Task Force 52, renamed when Admiral William Halsey took command of the fleet) off Okinawa. On 13 June the ship picked up a crashed TBF Avenger crew from Shipley Bay and joined up with Task Unit 32.1.3 on the same day. Her forward 5-inch gun was rendered inoperable in a 14 June collision with the escort carrier Block Island while taking on ammunition. O'Flaherty put into Kerama Retto on 20 June to replace the damaged 5-inch gun with one from her irreparably damaged sister Oberrender and while there witnessed a kamikaze raid on 21 June that hit several support ships. On the latter date, organized resistance ended on Okinawa. Okinawa proved to be her last combat operation; during her service O'Flaherty lost no personnel in combat.

=== Return to convoy duty and end of service ===
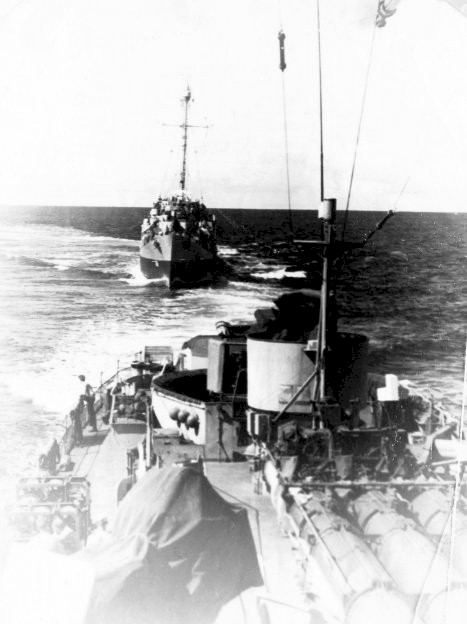
John C. Butler steaming behind O'Flaherty at Ulithi, August 1945

Ready for sea again, O'Flaherty spent a day in the anti-submarine screen off Okinawa and on 10 July departed as escort commander for a convoy to Guam consisting mostly of Landing Ship, Tanks (LST). After an uneventful voyage, the ship reached Guam on 16 July, and departed for Ulithi, where she arrived on 17 July. With Task Group 94.17, which included the escort carrier Salamaua, O'Flaherty, and her sister John C. Butler, she operated on anti-submarine patrol in the Marianas–Okinawa convoy lanes until the two destroyer escorts were relieved by three others on 28 July. O'Flaherty and John C. Butler proceeded to Okinawa, from which they departed on 30 July as part of the escort for a Saipan-bound convoy of LSTs and Landing Ship Mediums. She rode out a typhoon en route and reached Saipan on 7 August, departing for Ulithi with John C. Butler on the next day. Arriving at Ulithi on 9 August, both destroyer escorts turned around on 14 August as escorts for an Okinawa-bound convoy of auxiliaries. With a crew excited at news of the Japanese surrender, she reached Okinawa with the convoy on 20 August and turned around on the next day with a Ulithi-bound convoy. Arriving at her destination on 27 August, she spent time there repairing a turbine needing a replacement bearing.

Departing on a final convoy run to Okinawa on 4 September, O'Flaherty returned to Ulithi for routine repairs on 15 September. She remained at anchor there for the rest of the month and early October, the routine broken by occasional exercises with other destroyer escorts. Between 7 and 10 October the ship went to sea to retrieve or sink a drifting barge deemed a navigational hazard, with her captain deciding to tow it back to Ulithi after attempts to sink it by gunfire failed. Returning to Guam on 11 October, she spent a brief period at Truk, then went back to Guam to return to the continental United States via Eniwetok and Pearl Harbor in November, arriving at Los Angeles.

Postwar, O'Flaherty conducted operations off California before being decommissioned at San Diego in January 1947. She remained in the Pacific Reserve Fleet berthed at Mare Island, Vallejo, California until she was struck from the Navy List on 1 December 1972. The ship was sold for scrap on 27 November 1973.

== Awards ==
O'Flaherty received four battle stars for World War II service, one each for her participation in the capture and occupation of Guam, the Lingayen Gulf landing, the assault and occupation of Iwo Jima, and the assault and occupation of Okinawa.
