= Liberty, Arizona =

Unincorporated community in Arizona, United States

- Populated place
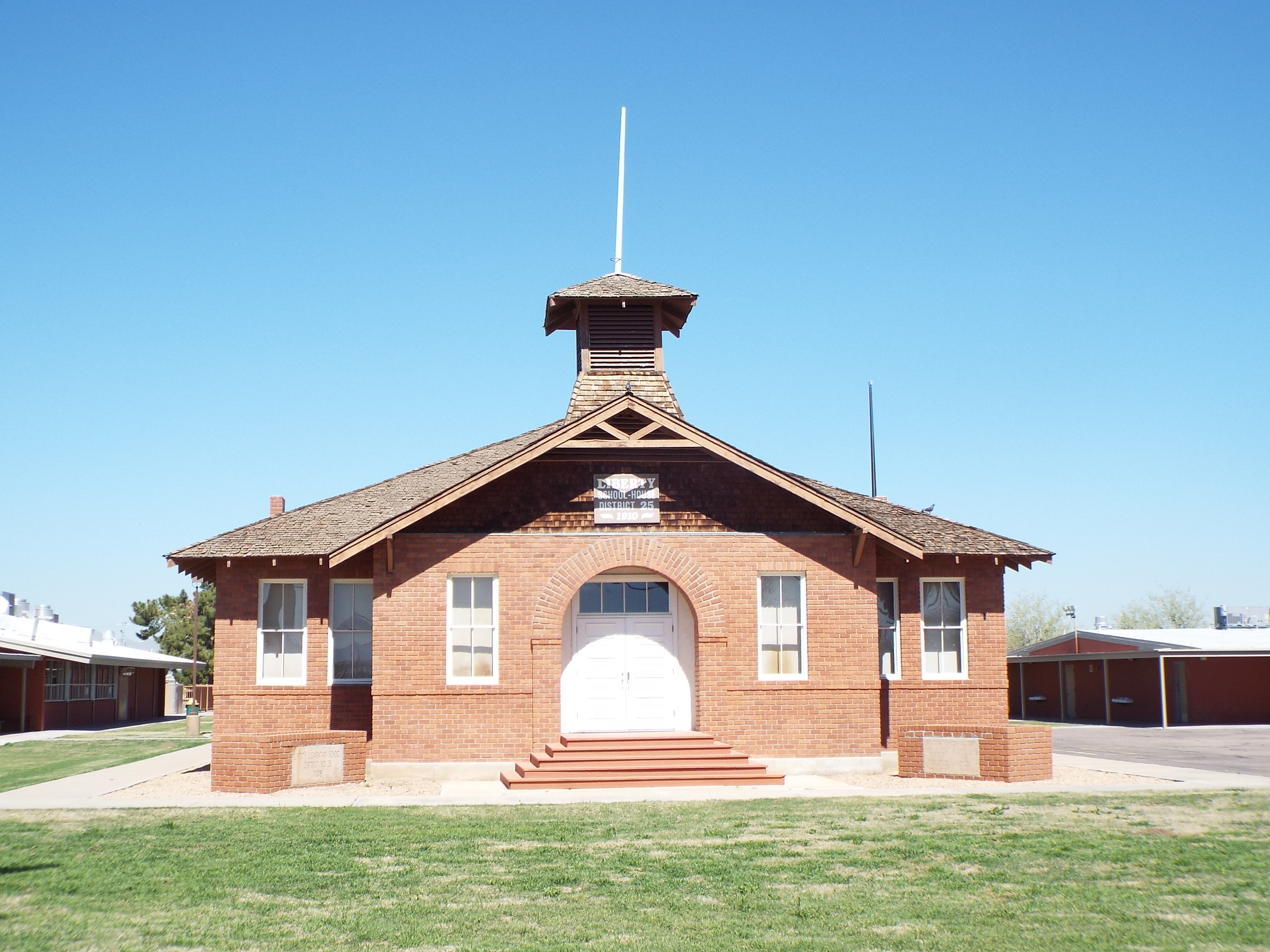
- Liberty School (1910)

- Location in Maricopa County and the state of Arizona
- Coordinates: 33°22′39″N 112°29′13″W
- Country: United States
- State: Arizona
- County: Maricopa
- Elevation: 876 ft (267 m)

Population (2000)
  - Total: 63
- Time zone: UTC-7 (Mountain (MST))
- FIPS code: 04-40910
- GNIS feature ID: 6992

Liberty is a small populated place in Maricopa County, Arizona, United States. It is located about 30 miles (48 km) west of Phoenix and about 6 mi (9.7 km) southeast of Buckeye. Liberty is located at the intersection of South Jackrabbit Trail and West Baseline Road. It is located entirely within Block 3017, Block Group 3, Census Tract 506.01, which had a population of 63 at the 2000 census.

The original settlers named the location Altamount, but the settlement soon became called Toothaker Place, after the first postmaster, Harriet Toothaker, who ran the post office out of her home. When the post office was relocated in 1901, it was renamed Liberty, and with it the community.

Liberty is home to the Liberty Elementary School District headquarters, although the district itself has expanded to include much of the surrounding areas of Buckeye and Goodyear.

Liberty exists as a county island within the corporate boundaries of Buckeye. This precludes any possibility of incorporation for the community.

== Notable person ==
- John C. Butler – Awarded the Navy Cross for his actions in the Battle of Midway during World War II.

== Gallery ==
Historic structures
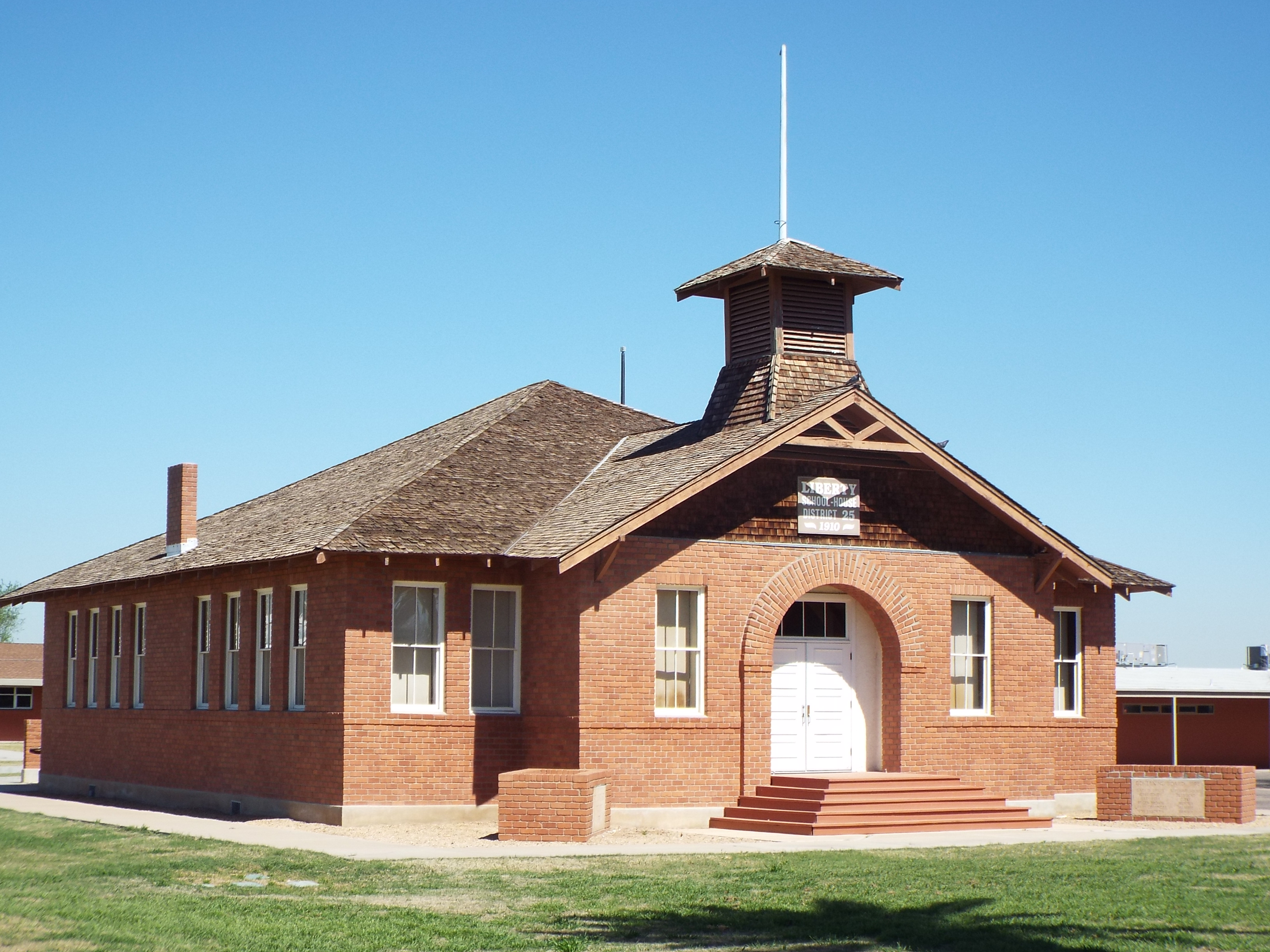
Liberty School was built in 1910 and is the oldest school in Arizona still in use.

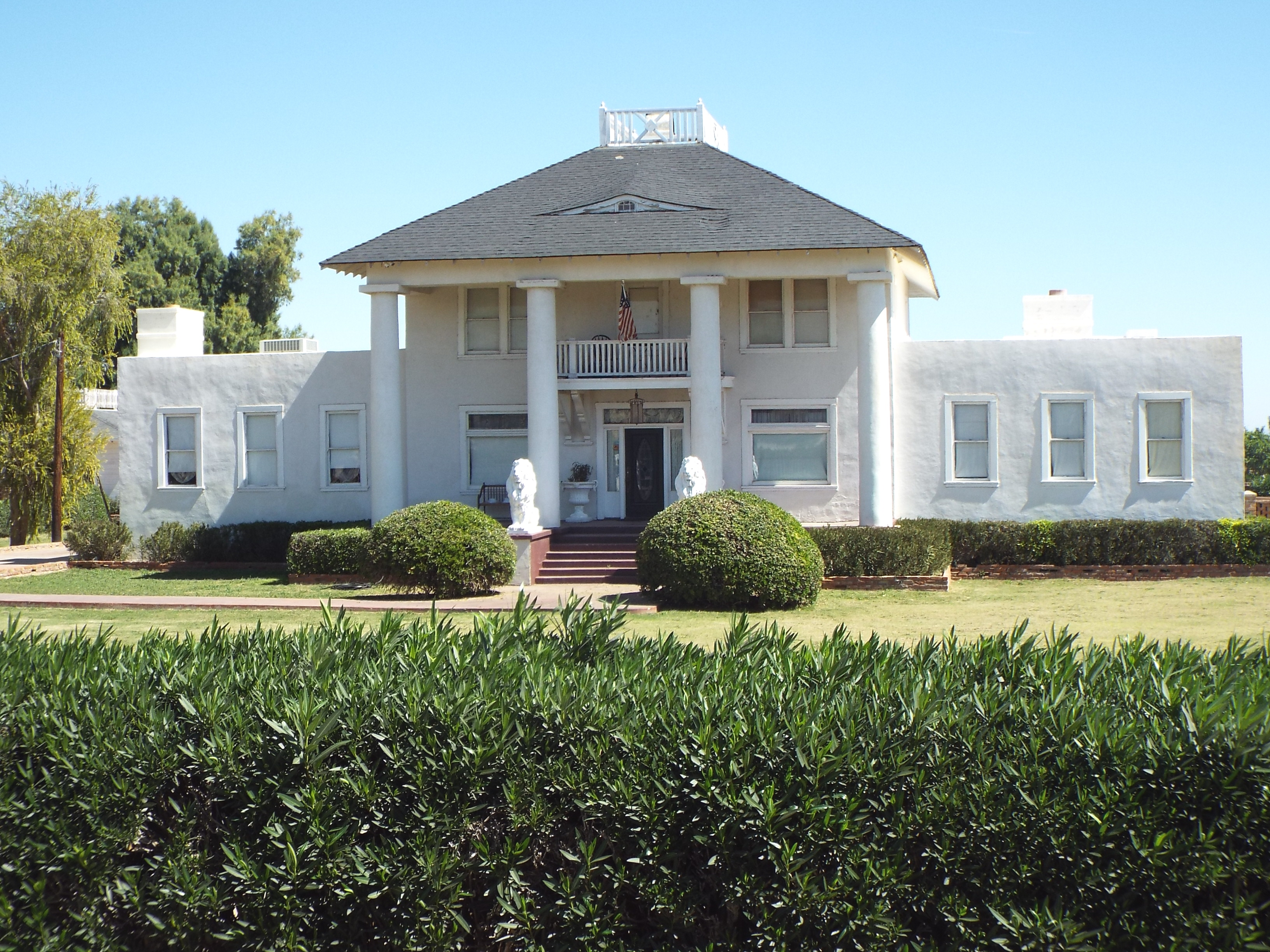
The "Old Spain House" (now known as the Nardini Manor) was built in 1886 and remodeled in 1912. It is located on 5601 S 195th Ave.

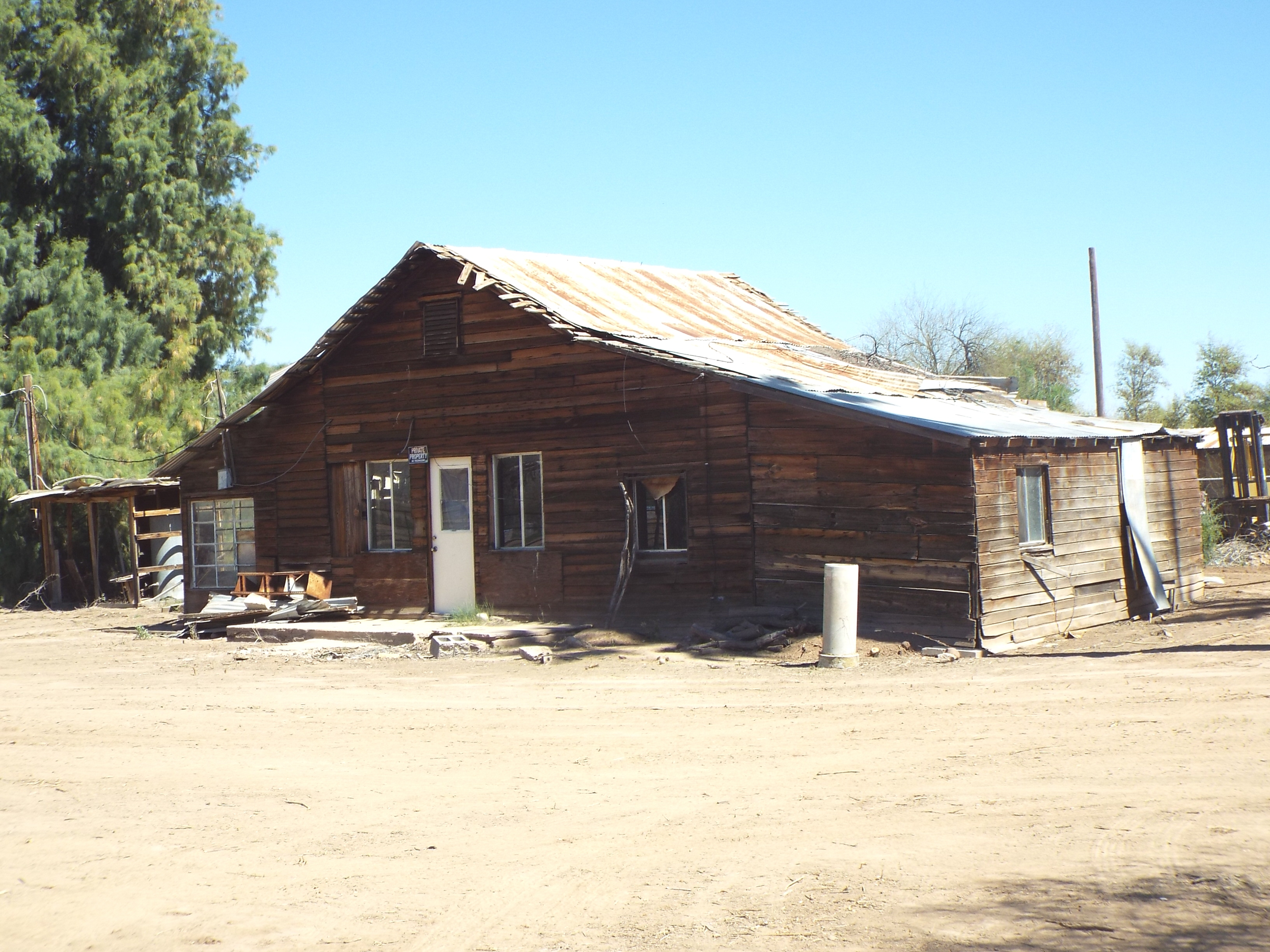
Old abandoned farm house on the Joshua L. Spain homestead.

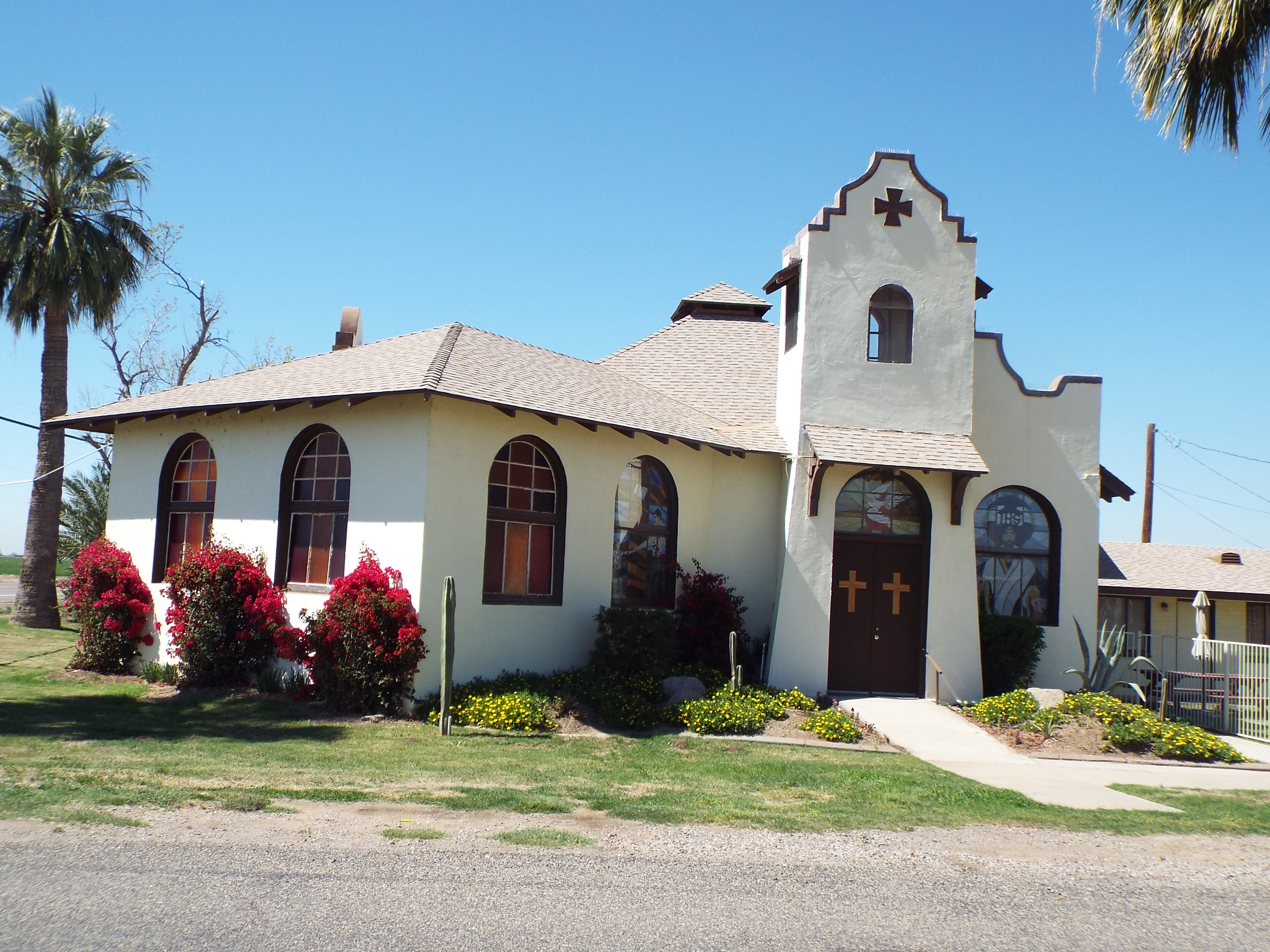
Liberty Methodist Church was built in 1903 and located on South Liberty School Road.

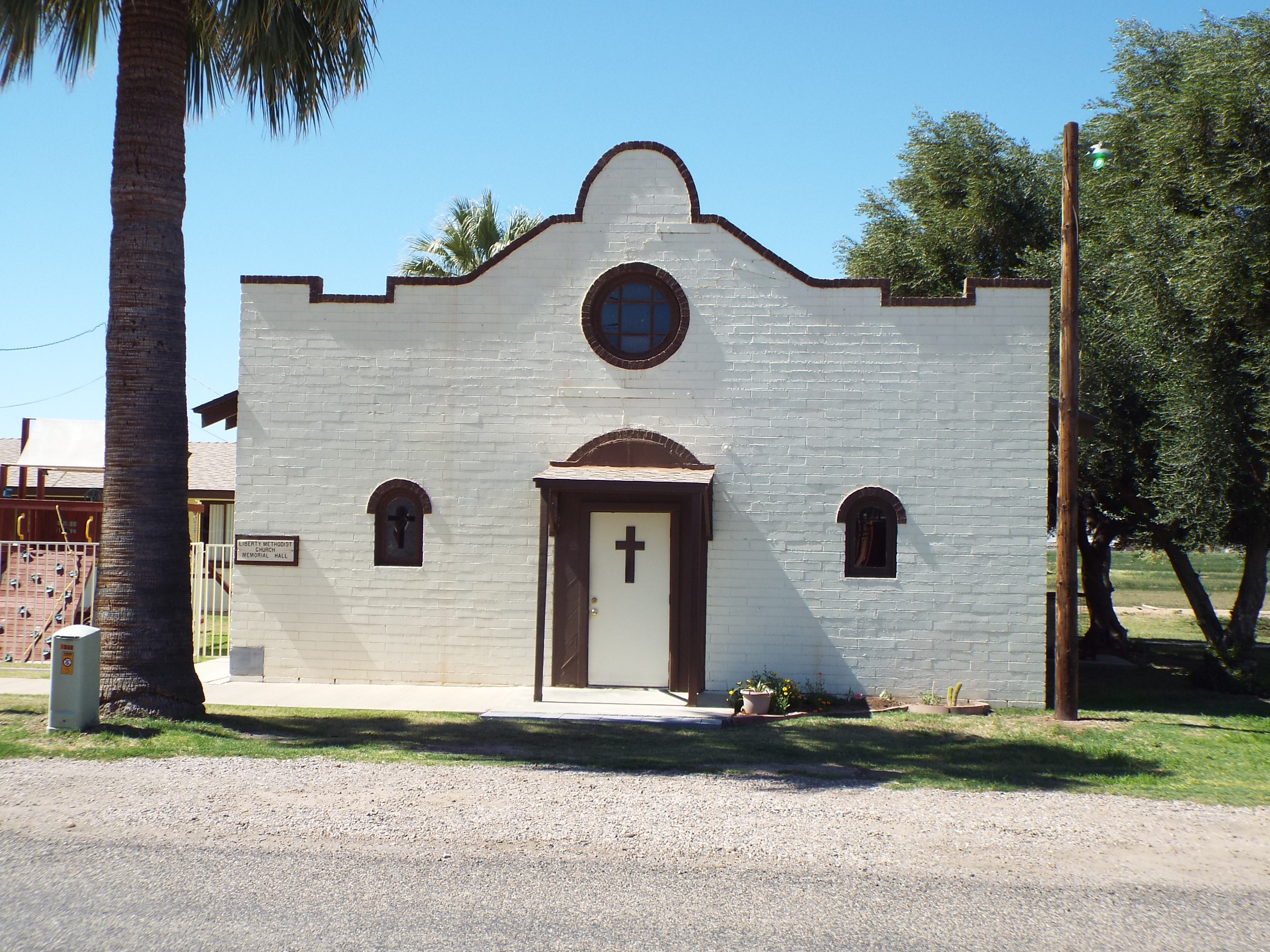
Liberty Methodist Church Memorial Hall built in 1903.
Historic cemetery (Note: According to the definition by the Pioneers' Cemetery Association (PCA) a "historic cemetery" is one which has been in existence for more than fifty years.)
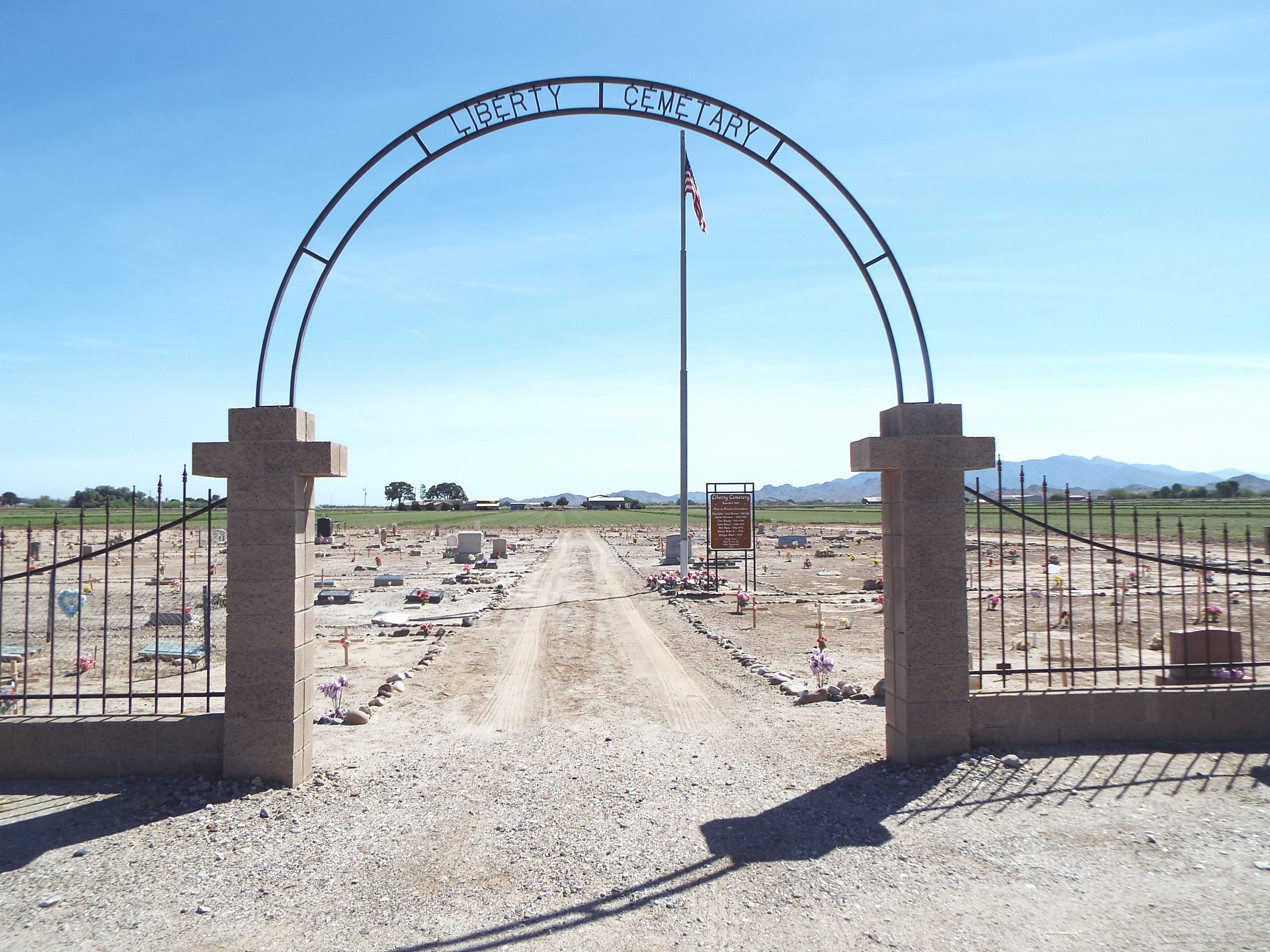
Liberty Cemetery was established in 1885 and is located on South 207 Ave. This is the final resting place of many of Buckeye’s pioneers.

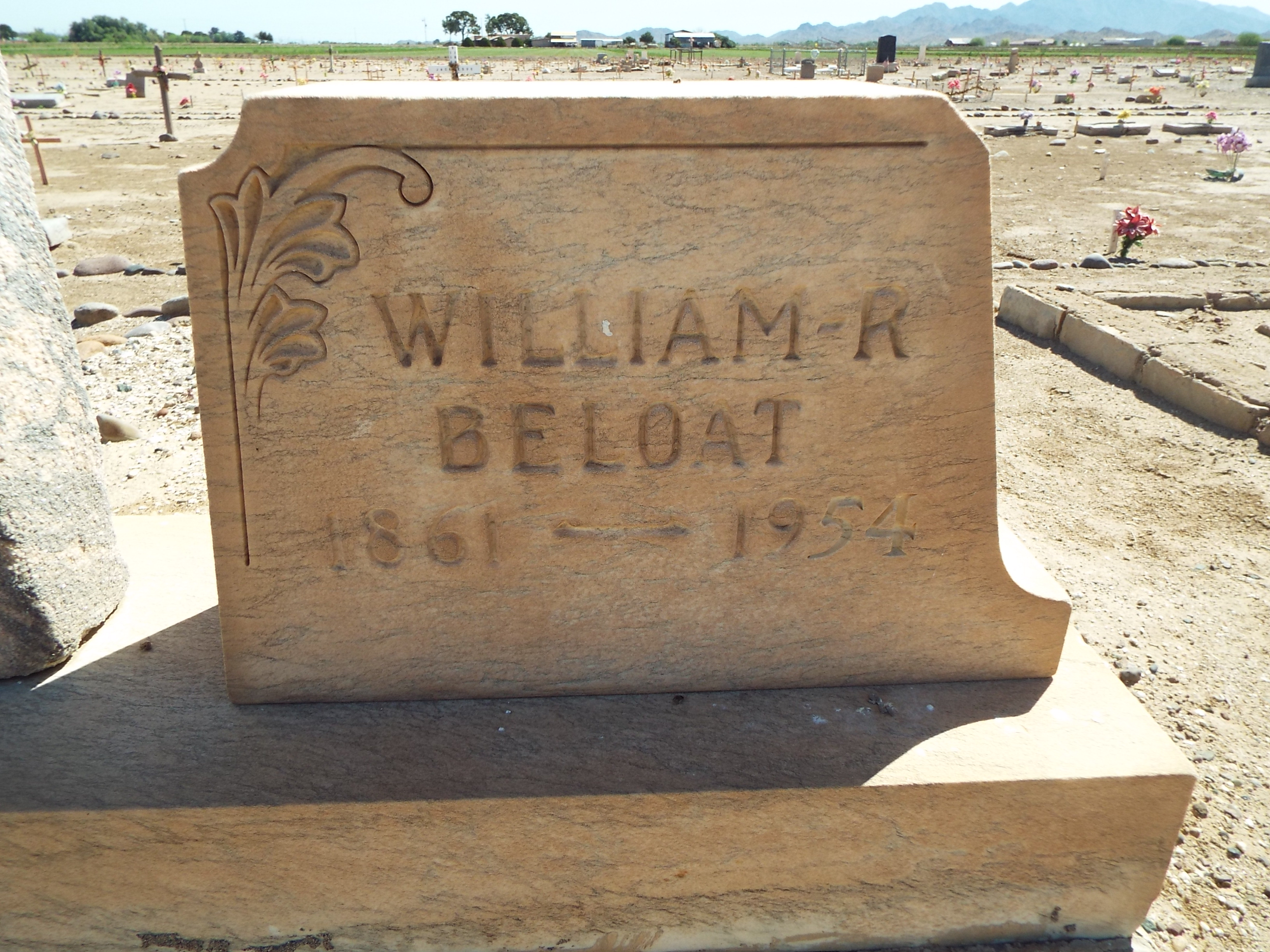
Grave of William "Bob" R. Beloat (1861–1954) A-5-4. Beloat was instrumental in organizing the Buckeye Irrigation Company, and he and his brother John assisted in turning the first water into the company ditch.

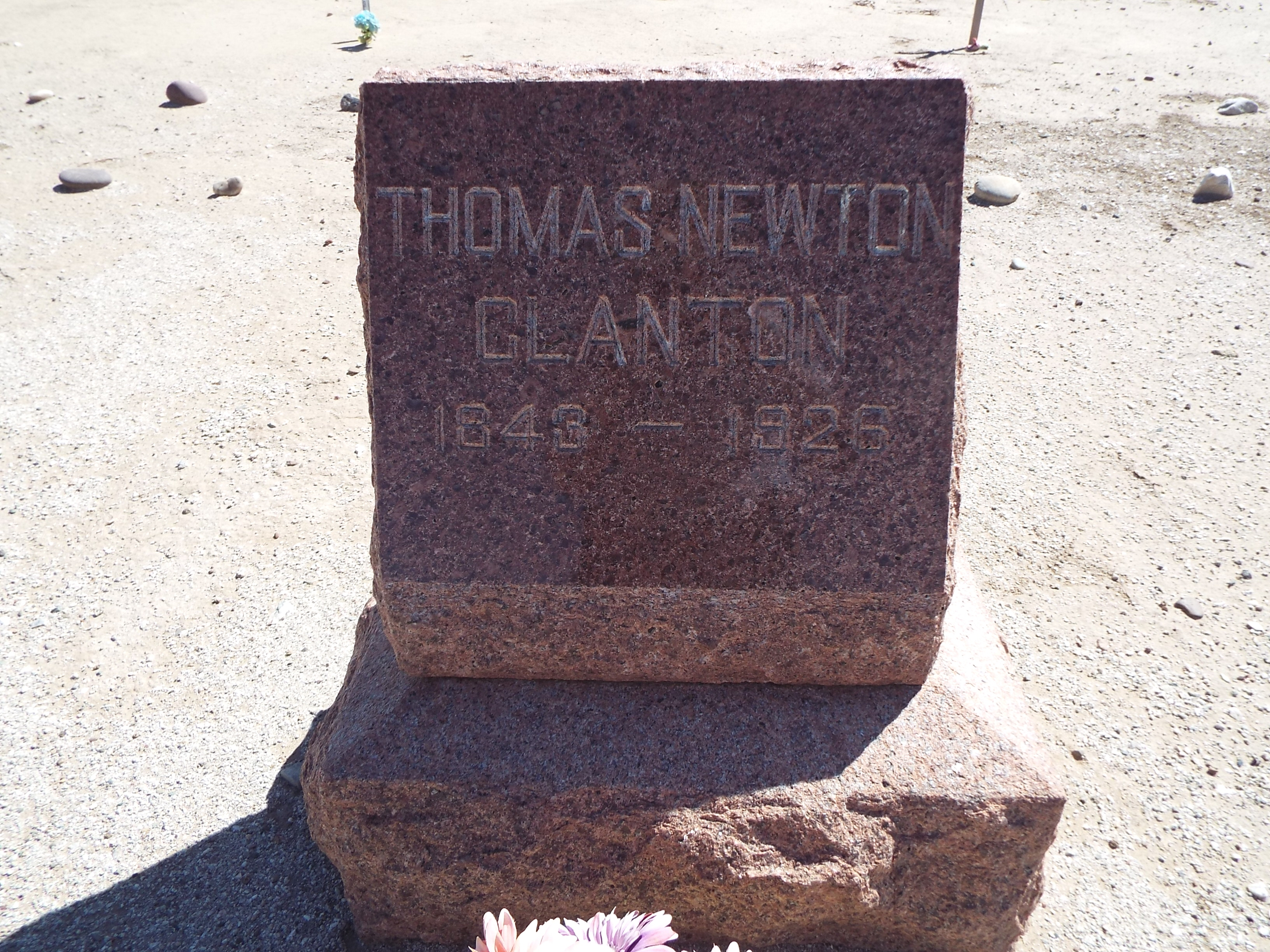
Grave of Thomas Newton ("Newt") Clanton (1843–1926) B-8-5. Clanton was the founder of Buckeye. He was a native of Creston, Iowa who moved to Arizona for health reasons.

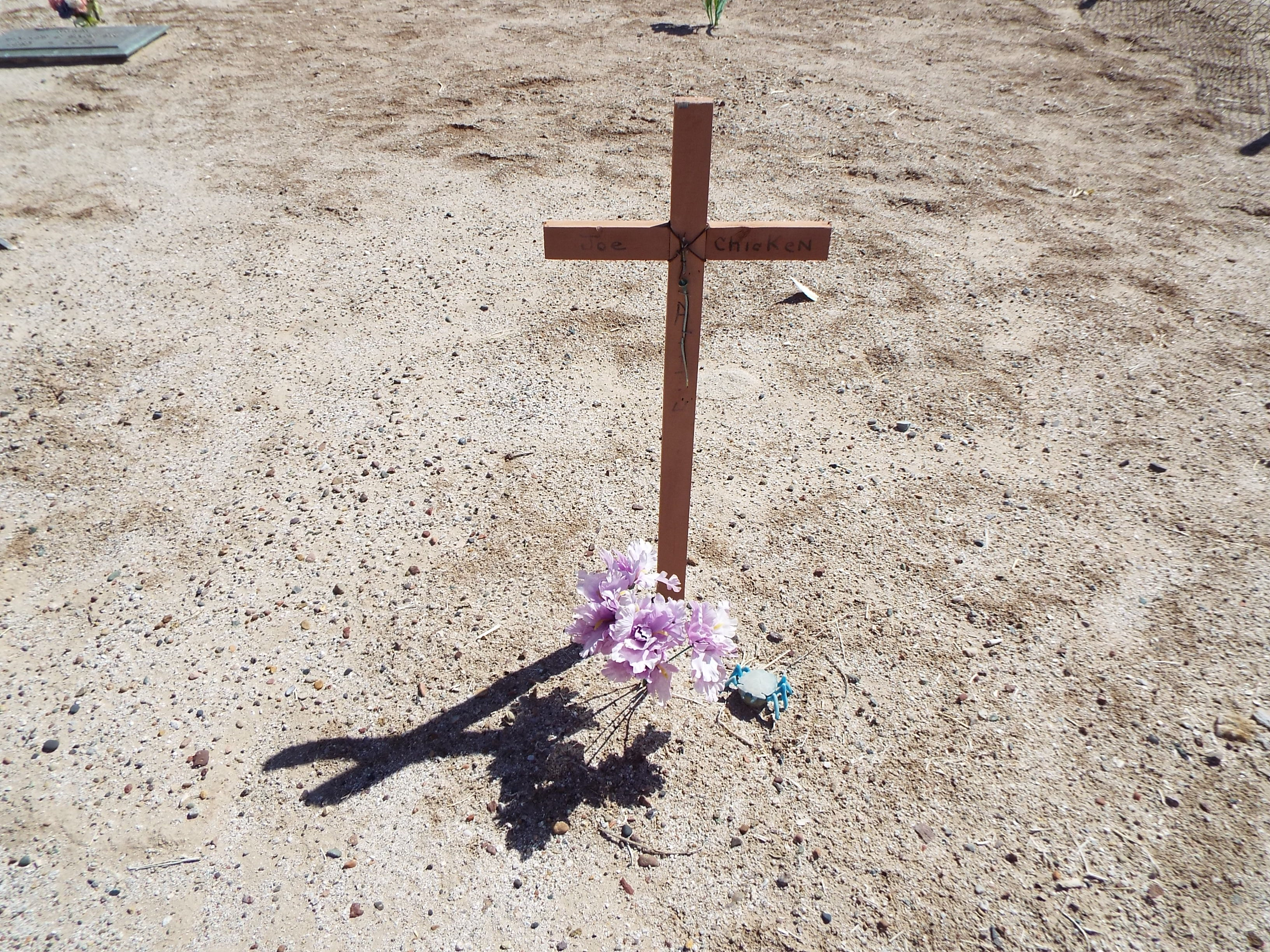
Grave of Joe Chicken (?–?) A-1-4.
