= USS Severn (AO-61) =

Oiler of the United States Navy

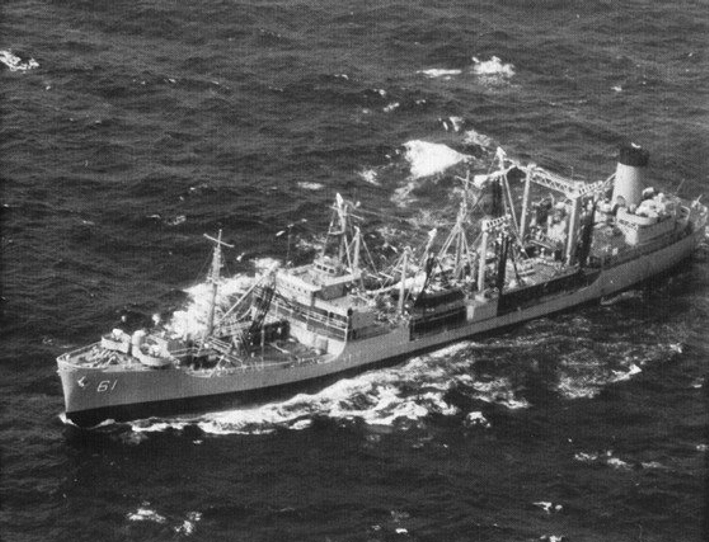

History

United States
- Ordered: as T3-S2-A1 tanker hull, MC hull 727
- Launched: 31 May 1944
- Commissioned: 19 July 1944
- Decommissioned: 3 July 1950
- Recommissioned: 29 December 1950
- Decommissioned: July 1974
- Stricken: 1 July 1974
- Home port: Newport RI
- Fate: Scrapped 22 January 1975

General characteristics
- Class & type: Cimarron-class fleet oiler
- Displacement: 7,236 t.(lt) 25,440 t.(fl)
- Length: 553 ft (169 m)
- Beam: 75 ft (23 m)
- Draught: 32 ft (9.8 m)
- Propulsion: geared turbines, twin screws, 30,400hp
- Speed: 18 kts
- Capacity: 146,000 barrels
- Complement: 314
- Armament: one single 5 in (130 mm) dual-purpose gun mount; four single 3 in (76 mm) dual-purpose gun mounts; four twin 40 mm AA gun mounts; four twin 20 mm AA gun mounts

USS Severn (AO-61) was a Cimarron-class fleet oiler. She was constructed for the U.S. Navy during World War II and her assignment was to provide liquids, such as fuel or water, to ships in the forward battle areas. She survived this dangerous task and returned home post-war with two battle stars to her credit.

The fourth Navy ship to be named Severn, she was laid down under Maritime Commission contract (MC hull 727) on 24 November 1943 by the Bethlehem-Sparrows Point Shipyard, Inc., Sparrows Point, Maryland; launched on 31 May 1944;delivered and commissioned on 19 July 1944.

== Pacific Theatre operations ==
Following shakedown in Chesapeake Bay, Severn departed the U.S. East Coast for the Panama Canal and duty as a fresh water carrier in the Pacific. Assigned to ServRon 8, she arrived at Pearl Harbor on 8 September and at Eniwetok on 22 September. There she discharged her cargo into YO's; and, on the 28th, sailed for the Admiralties. At Manus, on 3 October, she commenced watering amphibious craft of the U.S. 7th Fleet preparing for the Leyte invasion; and, on 13 October, got under way for Hollandia, whence she sailed for Leyte Gulf on 18 October.

=== Philippine Islands invasion ===
On 23 October the Battle for Leyte Gulf began; and, as that day turned into the 24th, Severn entered the gulf. After daylight, she moved into San Pedro Bay. An hour later, she underwent her first air attack; and, on the 25th, began discharging fresh water.

=== Missed by a bomb from a plane ===
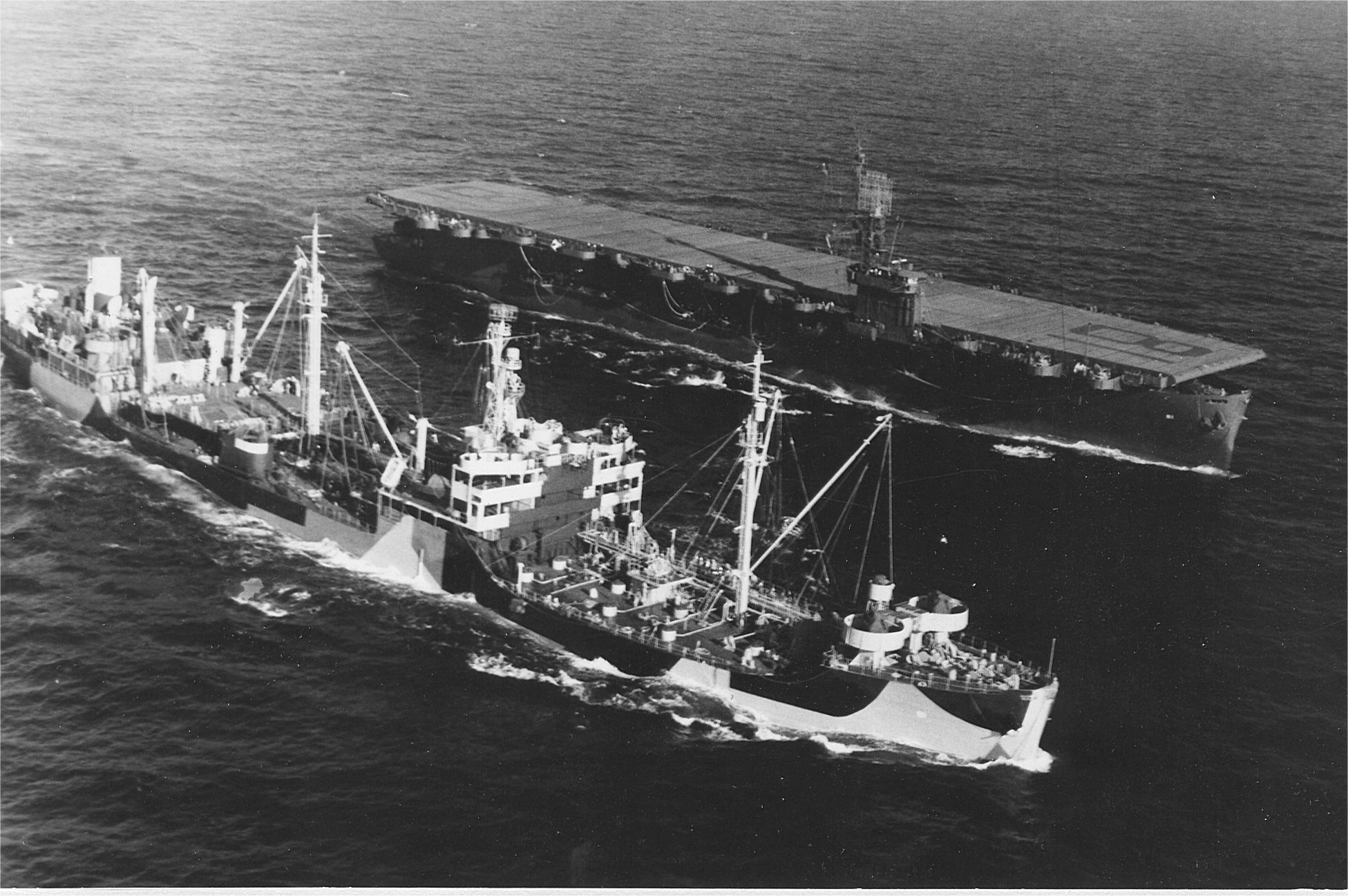
Severn and USS Rudyerd Bay, in April 1944.

Through the daily air attacks of the next few weeks, Severn continued to provide U.S. 7th Fleet units with water. By November, the attacks were down to two a day and were usually broken up by friendly aircraft. But, on the 24th, an enemy plane penetrated the CAP cover and released a bomb aimed at the water carrier. The bomb missed Severn, but hit PC-1124 then receiving water.

In December, Severn returned to Manus; took on more water, clothing, dry provisions, and lube oil; loaded an LCVP and 2 jeeps at Hollandia; then returned to the Philippines in time to support the landings in Lingayen Gulf. Arriving in that gulf on 13 January 1945, she distributed water and fuel oil through the 26th; then returned to San Pedro Bay. From Leyte, she proceeded back to the Admiralties; and, on 14 February, got under way for the Western Carolines.

=== South Pacific operations ===
During March, Severn filled her cargo tanks with water at Guam and offloaded at Ulithi—into ships staging for the Okinawa campaign. In April, she continued to focus her operations on Ulithi, which she left only to rendezvous with U.S. 5th Fleet units at sea to return to the Marianas to refill her cargo tanks. In May, with the arrival of USS Ataban (AW-4) at Ulithi, she commenced roughly triangular operations which took her from the Carolines to the Admiralties to the Marianas and back to the Carolines—taking on potable water at Manus and Guam and discharging it into water carriers and small craft at Saipan and Ulithi.

=== End-of-war activity ===
In August, Severn moved up to Okinawa to discharge water to ships in Buckner Bay and in the Hagushi anchorage. After the end of hostilities, she remained at Okinawa, and-during September, October, and November, she shuttled water from Samar to the Ryūkyūs. In December, she carried water to distributing ships at Sasebo, Kagoshima, and Wakayama, Japan; and, on the 27th, sailed for the United States.

== Nuclear testing at Bikini ==
Severn arrived at San Pedro, California, on 10 January 1946. Overhaul followed; and, in May, she sailed for the Marshalls. There, into October, she provided fresh water to units of Joint Task Force 1 during Operation Crossroads, the atomic test series conducted that summer at Bikini Atoll. She then returned to the United States; and, in December, assumed the duties of an oiler and initially transported Navy special fuel and diesel fuel between U.S. West Coast ports.

== Post-war runs ==
At mid-month, Severn sailed for Japan where she joined ServRon 3 and commenced shuttling fuel between Japanese and Korean ports. In February 1947, she was transferred to Persian Gulf runs; and, into July, moved fuel from Ras at Tanura to Yokosuka. In July, she returned to the U.S. West Coast for overhaul; and, in November, resumed runs between Japan and the Persian Gulf. In May 1948, her schedule was altered; and, into September, she carried petroleum products from the Middle East to the east coast of the United States. She then returned to the Pacific; and, but for a run to Europe, she conducted Persian Gulf-Japan runs until ordered back to the United States for inactivation in January 1950.

== Decommissioning ==
At the end of that month, she proceeded to the Puget Sound Navy Yard for tank cleaning and voyage repairs; then, in early April, moved south to San Diego, California, to complete inactivation. Despite the outbreak of hostilities in Korea, she was decommissioned as scheduled on 3 July but was soon reactivated again as that conflict drew available shipping into the Pacific and produced unfilled demands in other areas.

== Recommissioned during Korean War ==
Severn was recommissioned on 29 December 1950 and, although assigned to Service Force, Atlantic, was initially employed in transpacific service. By April 1951, when she transited the Panama Canal to take up duties with the Atlantic Fleet, she had completed two runs to Japan.

== East Coast operations ==
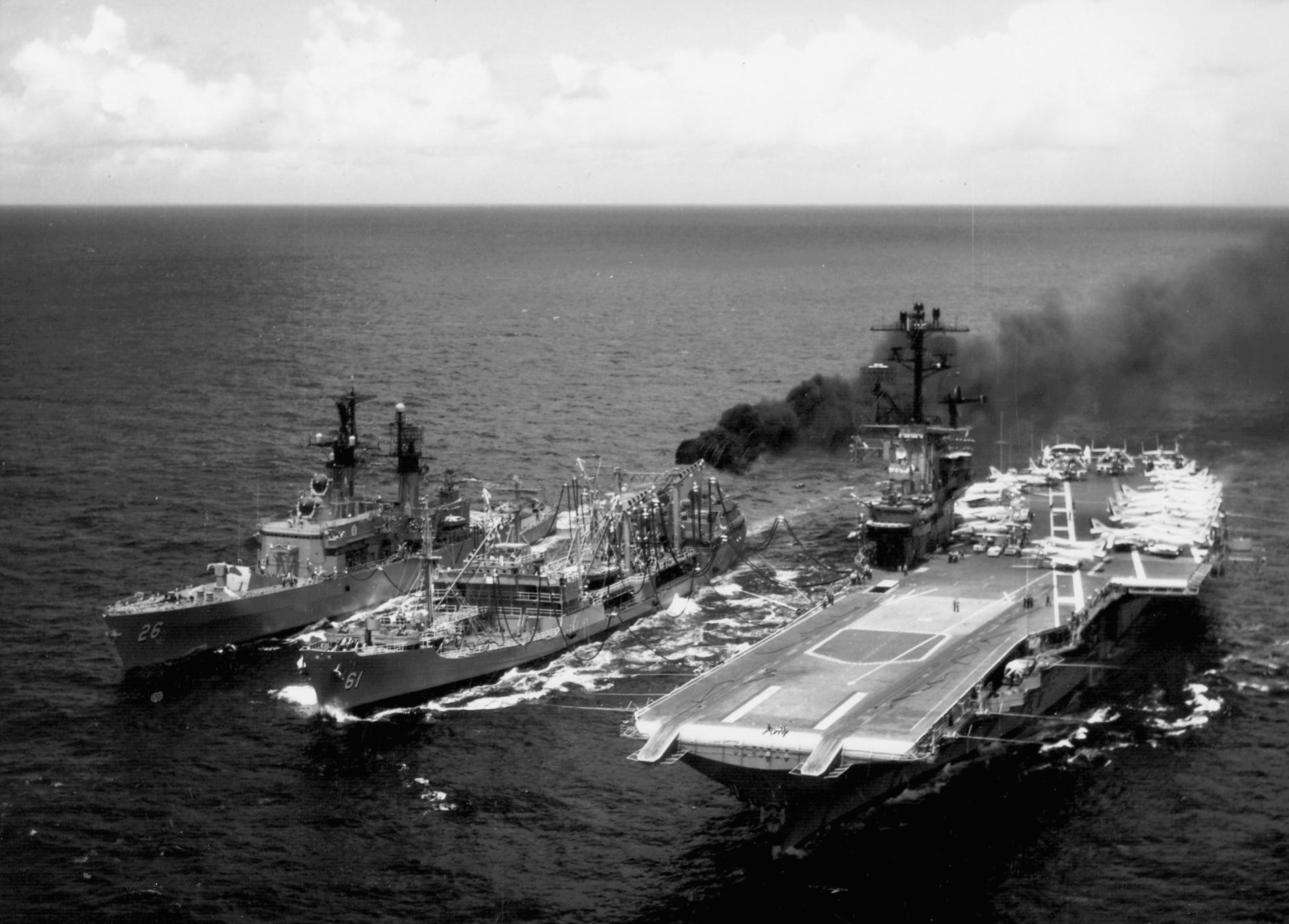
Severn refueling USS Intrepid and USS Belknap in 1968.

Homeported at Newport, Rhode Island, Severn operated along the east coast and in the Puerto Rican area into the fall and, in November, was deployed, for the first time, to the Mediterranean for duty with the U.S. 6th Fleet. In March 1952, she returned to Newport. During the summer, she participated in midshipman cruise "Baker;" and, in the fall, after availability and independent ship exercises, resumed participation in scheduled operations in the western Atlantic and Caribbean.

Severn returned to Newport, Rhode Island, from her next to last Mediterranean deployment on 10 June 1971. She spent the next 18 months engaged in operations and exercises out of Newport. Her final deployment to the Mediterranean was from January through August 1973.

== Final decommissioning ==
During the first six months of 1974, Severn was at Newport preparing for decommissioning. On 1 July 1974, she was decommissioned and towed to the Inactive Ship Maintenance Facility at Philadelphia, Pennsylvania. Her name was struck from the Navy List, and her hulk was turned over to the Maritime Commission for disposal. Subsequently, she was sold by MARAD and scrapped on 22 January 1975.

== Military awards and honors ==
Severn earned two battle stars during World War II.
