= John Boteler =

John Boteler may refer to:

- Sir John le Boteler (c. 1328–1399), MP for Lancashire 1366–97
- John Boteler (1402–1430), MP for Lancashire 1425–26
- John Boteler, 1st Baron Boteler of Brantfield (c. 1566–1637), MP for Hertfordshire 1625–26
- John Boteler (1587–1653), MP for Hertfordshire 1625–26
- John Boteler (died 1746) MP for Hythe 1701–10 and 1711–15
- John Boteler (1684–1774), MP for Hertford 1715–22 and Wendover 1734–35

== See also ==
- John Boteler Parker (1786–1851), English army general
- John Butler (disambiguation)
