= USS Rudyerd Bay =

Casablanca-class escort carrier of the US Navy

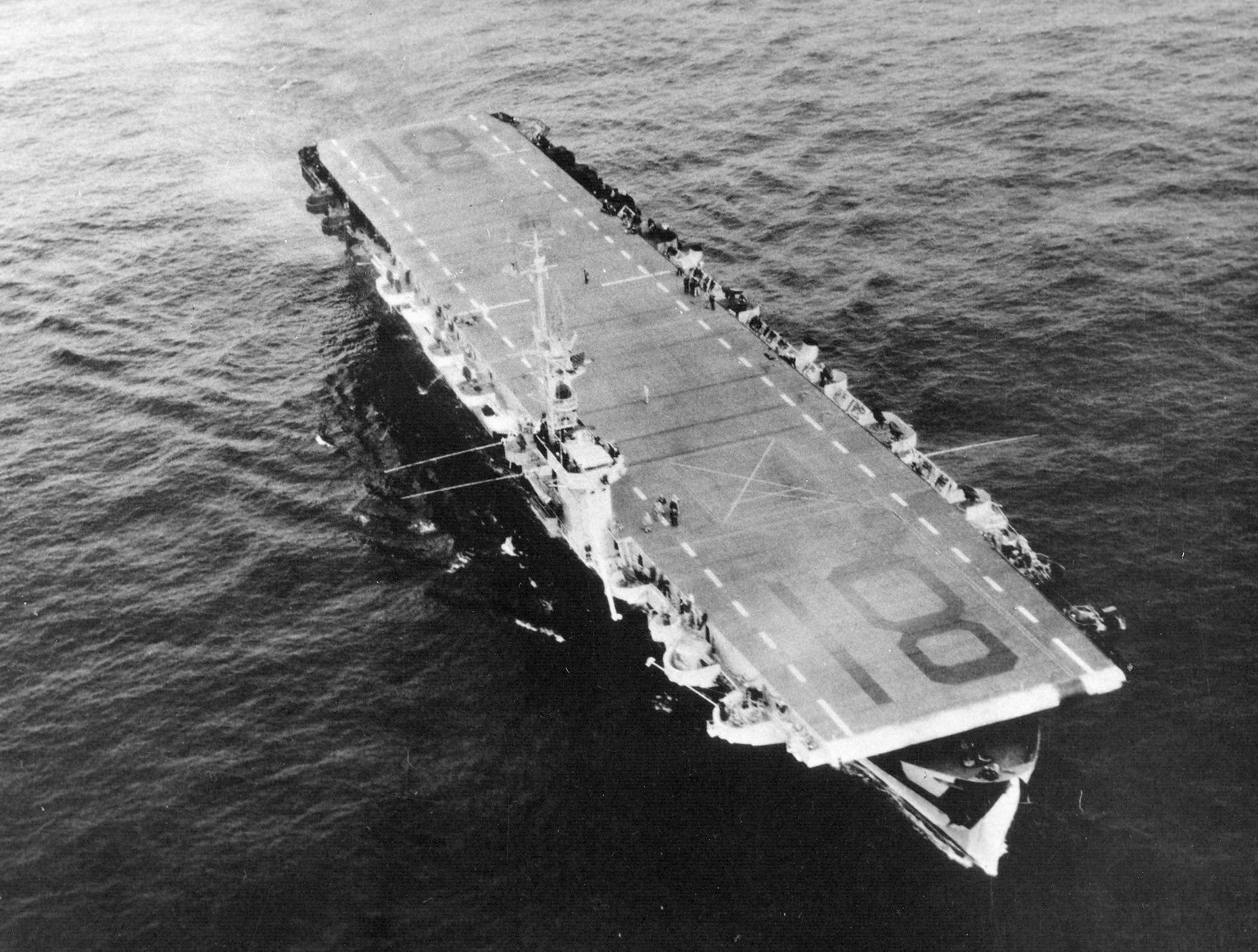
- USS Rudyerd Bay underway, 19 July 1944. She is wearing camouflage Measure 32, Design 15a.

History

United States
- Name: Rudyerd Bay
- Namesake: Rudyerd Bay, Ketcchikan Gateway Bourough, Alaska
- Ordered: as a Type S4-S2-BB3 hull, MCE hull 1118
- Awarded: 18 June 1942
- Builder: Kaiser Shipyards
- Laid down: 24 October 1943
- Launched: 12 January 1944
- Commissioned: 25 February 1944
- Decommissioned: 11 June 1946
- Stricken: 1 August 1959
- Identification: Hull symbol: CVE-81
- Honors and awards: 5 Battle stars
- Fate: Sold for scrap, January 1960

General characteristics
- Class & type: Casablanca-class escort carrier
- Displacement: 8,188 long tons (8,319 t) (standard); 10,902 long tons (11,077 t) (full load)
- Length: 512 ft 3 in (156.13 m) (oa); 490 ft (150 m) (wl); 474 ft (144 m) (fd)
- Beam: 65 ft 2 in (19.86 m); 108 ft (33 m) (extreme width)
- Draft: 20 ft 9 in (6.32 m) (max)
- Installed power: 4 × Babcock & Wilcox boilers; 9,000 shp (6,700 kW)
- Propulsion: 2 × Skinner Unaflow reciprocating steam engines; 2 × screws
- Speed: 19 knots (35 km/h; 22 mph)
- Range: 10,240 nmi (18,960 km; 11,780 mi) at 15 kn (28 km/h; 17 mph)
- Complement: Total: 910 – 916 officers and men; Embarked Squadron: 50 – 56; Ship's Crew: 860
- Armament: As designed: 1 × 5 in (127 mm)/38 cal dual-purpose gun; 4 × twin 40 mm (1.57 in) Bofors anti-aircraft guns; 12 × 20 mm (0.79 in) Oerlikon anti-aircraft cannons; Varied, ultimate armament: 1 × 5 in (127 mm)/38 cal dual-purpose gun; 8 × twin 40 mm (1.57 in) Bofors anti-aircraft guns; 20 × 20 mm (0.79 in) Oerlikon anti-aircraft cannons
- Aircraft carried: 27
- Aviation facilities: 1 × catapult; 2 × elevators

Service record
- Part of: United States Pacific Fleet (1944–1946); Atlantic Reserve Fleet (1946–1959)
- Operations: Mariana and Palau Islands campaign; Philippines campaign; Invasion of Iwo Jima; Battle of Okinawa; Operation Magic Carpet

USS Rudyerd Bay (CVE-81) was the twenty-seventh of fifty Casablanca-class escort carriers built for the United States Navy during World War II. She was named after Rudyerd Bay, within Ketcchikan Gateway Bourough, of the Territory of Alaska. Today, the bay lies within Misty Fjords National Monument. The ship was launched in January 1944, commissioned in February, and served as a replenishment and transport carrier throughout the Mariana and Palau Islands campaign and the Philippines campaign. Later, she served as a frontline carrier, providing air cover and support for the invasion of Iwo Jima, and the Battle of Okinawa. Postwar, she participated in Operation Magic Carpet, repatriating U.S. servicemen from throughout the Pacific. She was decommissioned in June 1946, when she was mothballed in the Atlantic Reserve Fleet. Ultimately, she was sold for scrapping in January 1960.

== Design and description ==
A side profile of the design of Thetis Bay.

Rudyerd Bay was a Casablanca-class escort carrier, the most numerous type of aircraft carriers ever built. Built to stem heavy losses during the Battle of the Atlantic, they came into service in late 1943, by which time the U-boat threat was already in retreat. Although some did see service in the Atlantic, the majority were utilized in the Pacific, ferrying aircraft, providing logistics support, and conducting close air support for the island-hopping campaigns. The Casablanca-class carriers were built on the standardized Type S4-S2-BB3 hull, a lengthened variant of the Doyen-class hull, and specifically designed to be mass-produced using welded prefabricated sections. This allowed them to be produced at unprecedented speeds: the final ship of her class, Munda, was delivered to the Navy just 101 days after the laying of her keel.

Rudyerd Bay was 512 ft 3 in (156.13 m) long overall (490 ft (150 m) at the waterline), had a beam of 65 ft 2 in (19.86 m), and a draft of 20 ft 9 in (6.32 m). She displaced 8,188 long tons (8,319 t) standard, which increased to 10,902 long tons (11,077 t) with a full load. To carry out flight operations, the ship had a 257 ft (78 m) hangar deck and a 474 ft (144 m) flight deck. Her compact size necessitated the installation of an aircraft catapult at her bow, and there were two aircraft elevators to facilitate movement of aircraft between the flight and hangar deck: one each fore and aft.

She was powered by four Babcock & Wilcox Express D boilers that raised 285 psi (1,970 kPa) of steam at 577 °F (303 °C). The steam generated by these boilers fed two Skinner Unaflow reciprocating steam engines, delivering 9,000 hp (6,700 kW) to two propeller shafts. This allowed her to reach speeds of 19 kn (35 km/h; 22 mph), with a cruising range of 10,240 nmi (18,960 km; 11,780 mi) at 15 kn (28 km/h; 17 mph). For armament, one 5 in (127 mm)/38 caliber dual-purpose gun was mounted on the stern. Additional anti-aircraft defense was provided by eight Bofors 40 mm (1.57 in) anti-aircraft guns in single mounts and twelve Oerlikon 20 mm (0.79 in) cannons mounted around the perimeter of the deck. By 1945, Casablanca-class carriers had been modified to carry twenty Oerlikon cannons and sixteen Bofors guns; the doubling of the latter was accomplished by putting them into twin mounts. Sensors onboard consisted of a SG surface-search radar and a SK air-search radar.

Although Casablanca-class escort carriers were intended to function with a crew of 860 and an embarked squadron of 50 to 56, the exigencies of wartime often necessitated the inflation of the crew count. They were designed to operate with 27 aircraft, but the hangar deck could accommodate much more during transport or training missions.

During the Invasion of Iwo Jima, she carried 15 FM-2 fighters, 11 TBM-1C torpedo bombers, and a TBM-1CP reconnaissance plane for a total of 27 aircraft. During the Battle of Okinawa, she carried 17 FM-2 fighters and 12 TBM-3 torpedo bombers, for a total of 29 aircraft.

== Construction ==
Her construction was awarded to Kaiser Shipbuilding Company, Vancouver, Washington under a Maritime Commission contract, on 18 June 1942. The escort carrier was laid down on 24 October 1943 under the name Kaita Bay, as part of a tradition which named escort carriers after bays or sounds in Alaska. She was laid down as MC hull 1118, the twenty-seventh of a series of fifty Casablanca-class escort carriers. She was launched on 12 January 1944; sponsored by the wife of Captain Scott Ernest Peck; transferred to the United States Navy and commissioned on 25 February 1944, with Captain Curtis Stanton Smiley in command.

== Service history ==
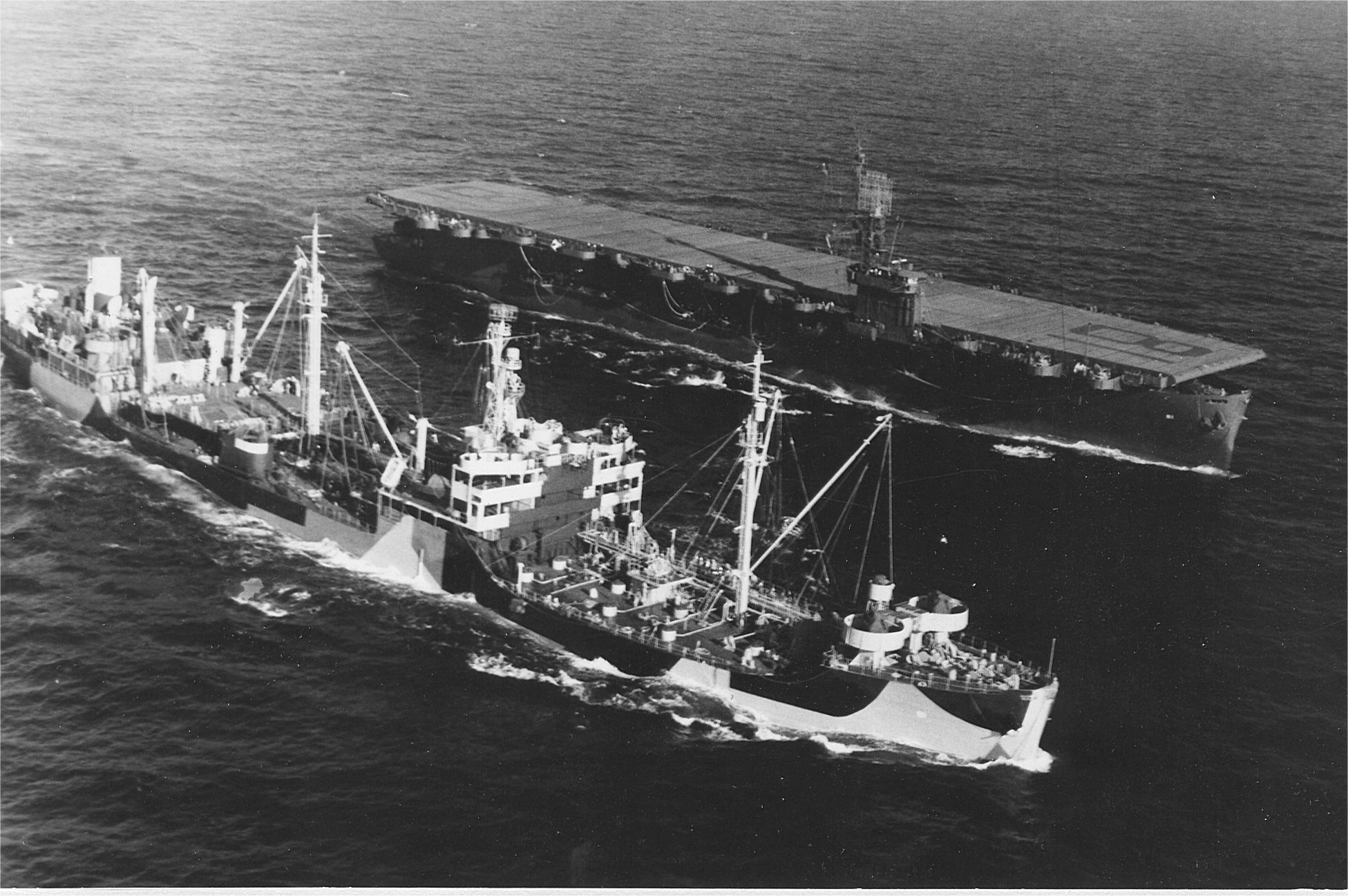
The fleet oiler Severn (foreground) and Rudyerd Bay (background) photographed steaming together in April 1944, before Rudyerd Bay had received its camouflage.

Upon being commissioned, Rudyerd Bay underwent a shakedown cruise down the West Coast to Southern California, where she took on a load of aircraft, which she ferried to Espiritu Santo of the New Hebrides throughout April and May. Upon returning to the West Coast, the carrier conducted qualification exercises off the California coast until July, before making another transport run to Majuro, in the Marshall Islands from 20 July to 26 July, escorted by the destroyer escort O'Flaherty. After finishing her mission, she embarked Composite Squadron 77 (VC-77), departing on 8 August for the West Pacific. At Enewetak Atoll in the Marshall Islands, she joined Task Group 30.8, the Fleet Oiler and Transport Carrier Group, which at the time, consisted of seven escort carriers (including Rudyerd Bay), seven destroyers, fifteen destroyer escorts, and twenty-four replenishment oilers, organized into eight task units. She then proceeded with the task group to Manus Island, in the Admiralty Islands, arriving on 31 August.

Throughout early September, Rudyerd Bay served as a replenishment carrier, providing replacement aircraft (from VC-77), parts, and supplies for the frontline Fast Carrier Task Force of the Third Fleet, which at the time was supporting the Mariana and Palau Islands campaign. Later, during October, she continued supporting the fast carriers as they operated in support of the Philippines campaign. Rudyerd Bay was still a part of Task Group 30.8, now renamed the At Sea Logistics Group. The fleet oilers had been detached, and the number of escort carriers involved had increased to eleven. On 18 October, the carrier took on the wounded of the light cruiser Houston, which had been subjected to two separate aerial torpedo hits. She transported them to Ulithi in the Caroline Islands, and by November, the carrier was back to replenishment duties, which would eventually take her into Typhoon Cobra.

On 17 December 1944, Rudyerd Bay was a part of Task Unit 30.8.12, alongside her sister Nehenta Bay, which was acting as the flagship. The two escort carriers were screened by the destroyer escorts Wesson and Swearer. By then, the Third Fleet had been operating against positions on Luzon since 14 December, but its escorting destroyers ran low on fuel. As a result, the fleet retired to the east to refuel, and to receive replacement aircraft from Task Group 30.8. Rudyerd Bay rendezvoused with the Third Fleet about 300 mi (480 km) east of Luzon early on 17 December. The location had been chosen because it lay out of range of Japanese fighters, but it also happened to lie within Typhoon Alley, where many Pacific tropical cyclones transited. As the escort carriers and the Third Fleet met, Typhoon Cobra began to bear down. At 01:00, fueling operations were attempted with the destroyers, although heavy winds and listing seas complicated the matter. At the same time, barometers on-board the ships began to drop, and tropical storm force winds were recorded.

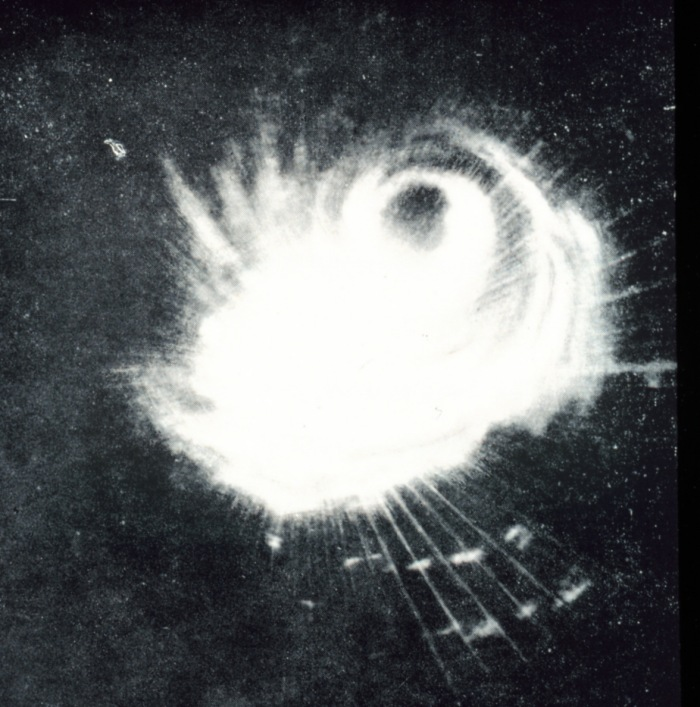
A radar image of Typhoon Cobra, 18 December 1944.

As the weather continued to deteriorate, Admiral William Halsey Jr. ordered fueling operations suspended at 13:10. He ordered his fleet to move to the next morning's planned rendezvous spot, approximately 160 mi (260 km) northwest, and comfortably safe from the typhoon's impacts. Two hours later, he instead ordered his fleet to proceed due southwards, 180 mi (290 km) from where the fleet was located. This brought the fleet directly into the typhoon's core. To make matters worse for the Third Fleet, Admiral Halsey ordered the fleet to proceed northwards at 22:20, putting the fleet in the quadrant of the typhoon with the highest winds. Blurry data and observations meant that command had little idea of where the typhoon actually was, with some weather maps pinning the typhoon's center some 100 mi (160 km) away, even whilst the fleet sailed directly into the eye. Attached to the Third Fleet, Rudyerd Bay followed.

At 07:00, on the morning of 18 December, the fleet was inescapably trapped in the typhoon's path. Conflicting orders meant that some of the destroyers attempted to do some fueling during the morning, even as waves with an estimated height of 60 ft (18 m) pounded the task force. At 07:22, Rudyerd Bay came to course at 60°, along with her sisters Kwajalein and Nehenta Bay. Rudyerd Bay struggled to maintain its course as it battled with high winds and waves cresting over the flight deck. At 10:17, Rudyerd Bay radioed that she was dead in the water, albeit control was quickly regained.

Nonetheless, all appearances suggest that Rudyerd Bay passed through Typhoon Cobra relatively intact and without much damage, given the fact that on 19 December, Halsey found it judicious to assign upon her and her sister Anzio, the task of combing through the area looking for survivors. On 20 December, at 05:00, the carrier was the first to report to Halsey that the destroyer Spence had capsized, with the loss of most of its crew. At 08:40, Rudyerd Bay, along with her screens, relieved the destroyer escort Tabberer, which had been conducting search and rescue operations for fifty straight hours.

Upon concluding rescue operations, Rudyerd Bay steamed back to Ulithi, where the destroyer escorts unloaded the survivors of the Spence. On 28 December, the escort carrier, accompanied by Nehenta Bay, several oilers, and various other ships, departed Ulithi, voyaging westwards to continue their replenishment role in support of the Philippines campaign. The carrier was situated in the Philippine Sea, until 10 January 1945, when she moved north to the South China Sea, in order to better support the fast carriers as they participated in the invasion of Lingayen Gulf and conducted strikes against Japanese shipping stretching from Indochina to Formosa. On 22 January, Rudyerd Bay left replenishment duty, transiting via the Sulu Sea, Mindanao Sea, and Leyte Gulf, before docking at Ulithi.

Rudyerd Bay remained at Ulithi until 10 February, when she left for Saipan, in the Mariana Islands, in preparation for the invasion of Iwo Jima. During this time period, Captain John Golden Foster Jr. took over command of the carrier. On 16 February, she left the Mariana Islands, as a part of Task Group 51.17, along with Saginaw Bay. The two carriers were responsible for providing air cover and escorting the troop transports as they ferried marines to the shores of Iwo Jima. Finishing this duty without incident on 18 February, the two carriers joined Task Group 52.2, the Support Carrier Group, as a part of Task Unit 52.2.3, which was under the command of Rear Admiral George R. Henderson.

Rudyerd Bay's aircraft contingent, VC-77, began flying missions in support of the marines on 19 February, as U.S. forces began touching down on the island's beaches. These missions were expected to include reconnaissance missions, flown by VC-77's sole TBM-1CP reconnaissance plane. However, after the plane had just taken off on its first mission, at 09:14, a scant twelve minutes after the first U.S. forces had touched down on the island, the Avenger had a large Japanese shell tear into it, turning the plane into a fireball and killing VC-77's commanding officer, LCDR Frank Peterson. Prior to Annapolis, he had enlisted in the marines and said that a Navy pilot was not going to fly the first flight of a Marine invasion. Nonetheless, VC-77 continued providing close air support and conducting antisubmarine patrols around Iwo Jima until 8 March, when Rudyerd Bay retired for Ulithi.

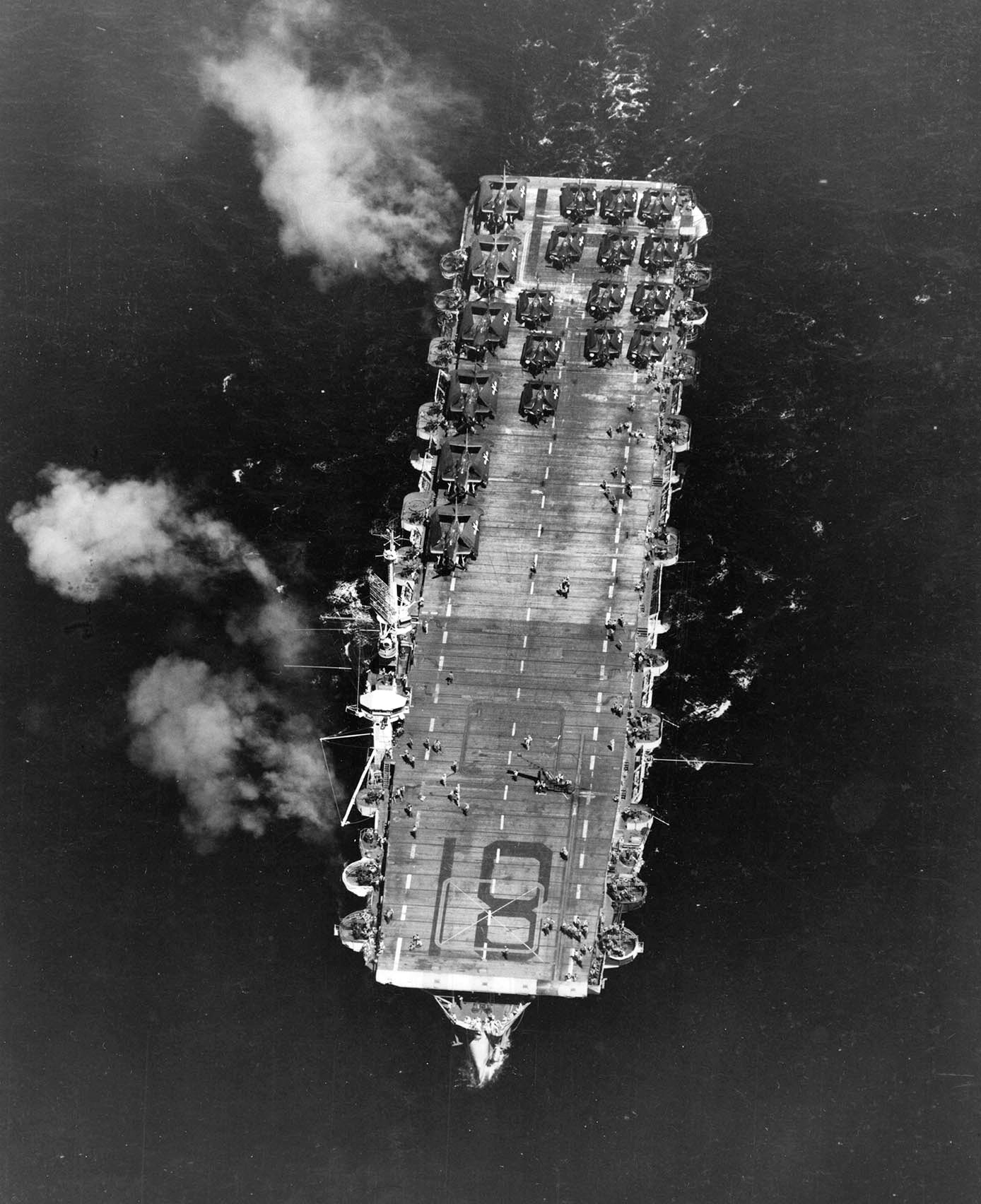
In an overhead shot of Rudyerd Bay on 20 May 1945, numerous aircraft of Composite Squadron 96 (VC-96), a couple of the carrier's crew, and a crane are visible.

Whilst Rudyerd Bay was stationed at Ulithi from 11 March to 20 March, her aircraft contingent was exchanged, with Composite Squadron 96 (VC-96) being embarked in preparation for the Battle of Okinawa. On 21 March, the carrier got underway, as a part of Task Unit 52.1.2, which was under the command of Rear Admiral Felix Stump. She arrived at her position on 25 March, about 60 mi (97 km) to the south of Okinawa, where she began launching strikes against enemy positions on Kerama Retto and on Okinawa itself. Rudyerd Bay's aircraft contingent, with the exceptions of 1 April and 8 April, operated daily until 17 April. From 13 to 15 April, VC-96 concentrated on the Sakishima Islands, where a squadron of Japanese kamikaze aircraft were being launched.

Throughout these operations, Rudyerd Bay witnessed a steady stream of both kamikazes and conventional Japanese aircraft make attacks on the escort carriers. For example, on the late afternoon of 2 April, Rudyerd Bay's fighters were scrambled when two kamikazes attacked her sister Wake Island, with an extreme near-miss tearing a large hole in the starboard side of the carrier. As the sun set, one of VC-96's fighters shot down a Mitsubishi A6M Zero, and as the Japanese planes disengaged, eight of her fighters were forced to make night landings, even though none of the pilots had been night-qualified. In the ensuing mayhem, two Wildcat fighters and an Avenger on the flight deck were rendered as complete losses, with four more planes being severely damaged, albeit remarkably, none of the pilots were killed or seriously injured.

On 17 April, Rudyerd Bay was rotated to Task Group 50.8, the Logistics Support Group, for a 10-day period of relative rest, although her aircraft were still responsible for providing an air screen for the replenishment carriers. She was rotated back to Task Group 52.1 on 27 April, whereupon she continued providing close air support. She was rotated again to Task Group 50.8 on 8 May, providing air cover until 20 May, when she retired from the Ryukyu Islands. By then, VC-96 had flown 1,257 sorties in support of the battle on Okinawa.

Proceeding eastwards, Rudyerd Bay arrived on Guam on 23 May, where she detached her aircraft contingent, VC-96, and embarked Composite Squadron 85 (VC-85) for transport back to the West Coast. Upon arriving back in the United States, she underwent overhaul, which took until the end of July. Upon the completion of overhaul, she was reassigned to plane ferry duty, which began on 1 August, when she ferried a load of aircraft from Naval Air Station Alameda to the Marshall Islands. Whilst she was still midway in her ferry mission, the Japanese surrender was announced. Nonetheless, Rudyerd Bay continued onwards, unloading cargo and passengers at Enewetak, before heading to Ulithi and the Philippines, and moving Composite Squadron (VC-33) to Okinawa. She then took on another aircraft squadron, which she transported back to the West Coast, arriving at San Francisco on 8 October.

There, Rudyerd Bay underwent repairs and modifications in order to better accommodate troops, before being assigned to the "Magic Carpet" fleet, which repatriated servicemen from throughout the Pacific. She made Magic Carpet runs for the rest of 1945, into the new year, finishing her final trans-Pacific run on 23 January 1946. On 18 February, she left dock at California, bound for the Eastern seaboard. She transited through the Panama Canal on 28 February, unloaded some aircraft at Jacksonville, Florida in early March, and steamed north to Boston, where inactivation work was commenced.

Rudyerd Bay was decommissioned on 11 June, and mothballed in the Atlantic Reserve Fleet, as part of its Boston group. Docked at the South Boston Naval Annex, she was reclassified as a utility carrier (CVU-81) on 12 June 1955. She was then further reclassified as an aviation transport (AKV-29) on 7 May 1959. She was struck from the Navy list on 1 August 1959, and sometime in January 1960, she was sold to Cantieri Navali Santa Maria, which broke her up in Genoa, Italy throughout 1960. Rudyerd Bay' received five battle stars for her World War II service.

== Sources ==
=== Online sources ===
- "'Rudyerd Bay' (CVE-81)". Dictionary of American Naval Fighting Ships. Naval History and Heritage Command. 27 April 2016. Archived from the original on 2 June 2019. This article incorporates text from this source, which is in the public domain.
- "Kaiser Vancouver, Vancouver WA". www.ShipbuildingHistory.com. 27 November 2010. Archived from the original on 16 June 2019.
- "World Aircraft Carriers List: US Escort Carriers, S4 Hulls". Hazegray.org. 14 December 1998. Archived from the original on 19 November 2021.
- Maksel, Rebecca (14 August 2012). "How Do You Name an Aircraft Carrier?". Air & Space/Smithsonian.

=== Bibliography ===
- Adcock, Al (1996), Escort Carriers in Action - Warships No. 9, Carrollton, Texas: Squadron/Signal Publications, ISBN 9780897473569
- Chesneau, Robert; Gardiner, Robert (1980), Conway's All the World's Fighting Ships 1922–1946, London, England: Naval Institute Press, ISBN 9780870219139
- Drury, Bob; Clavin, Thomas; Conger, Eric (2007), Halsey's Typhoon: The True Story of a Fighting Admiral, an Epic Storm, and an Untold Rescue, Minneapolis, Minnesota: Grove Press, ISBN 9781598873535
- Friedman, Norman (1983), U.S. Aircraft Carriers: An Illustrated Design History, Annapolis, Maryland: Naval Institute Press, ISBN 9780870217395
- Ross, Al (1993), The Escort Carrier Gambier Bay, Anatomy of the Ship, London, England: Conway Maritime Press, ISBN 9781557502353
- Y'Blood, William (2012), The Little Giants: U.S. Escort Carriers Against Japan, Annapolis, Maryland: Naval Institute Press, ISBN 9781612512471
