= John O. Butler =

American dentist

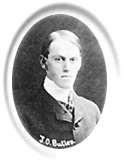
Dr. John O. Butler

Dr. John O. Butler was an American dentist and periodontist in Chicago, Illinois, and founder of the John O. Butler Company, manufacturer of toothbrushes, dental floss in 1923 and sundry oral-care products under the Butler and GUM brand names. The company was purchased in 1988 by Sunstar Group, a major Japanese manufacturer of personal care products and other diversified products including devices for improved air quality. In 2006 the John O. Butler Company adopted the name of its parent company, although the brand names Butler and GUM are still in use. John O. Butler Company provided Sunstar with both knowledge and access to the U.S. market. Sunstar provided John O. Butler with production methodology and technical assistance.
