= Jack Butler (footballer, born 1877) =

English footballer

Personal information
- Full name: John Butler
- Date of birth: 27 May 1877
- Place of birth: West Bromwich, England
- Date of death: 1955
- Position: Full back

Senior career*
Years	Team	Apps	(Gls)
- Kiveton Park
1904–1907	Grimsby Town	47	(3)
1907–1915	Plymouth Argyle	297	(2)
- * Club domestic league appearances and goals

John Butler (27 May 1877 – 1955) was an English professional footballer who played in the Football League for Grimsby Town between 1904 and 1907. A full back who occasionally played as a forward, he joined Grimsby from Kiveton Park. On leaving the club in 1907, he played in the Southern League and the Western League for Plymouth Argyle, making 297 appearances in all competitions, before the First World War put an end to his football career.
