= Jack Butler (footballer, born 1868) =

Welsh footballer

Personal information
- Date of birth: 1868
- Place of birth: Wales
- Date of death: 1956 (aged 87–88)
- Position: Forward

International career
Years	Team	Apps	(Gls)
1893	Wales	3	(0)

Jack Butler (born 1868) was a Welsh international footballer. He was part of the Wales national football team, playing 3 matches. He played his first match on 13 March 1893 against England and his last match on 5 April 1893 against Ireland.

== See also ==
- List of Wales international footballers (alphabetical)
