= John Joseph Butler =

American Roman Catholic priest

John Joseph Butler (February 22, 1883 – December 18, 1966) was a Catholic priest and founder of Catholic Charities of the Catholic Archdiocese of Saint Louis.

== Early life ==
His parents, Patrick and Mary Ann (O'Leary) Butler, were both born in County Tipperary, Ireland. After immigrating to America, they met and married in Saint Louis, Missouri. Butler was one of nine children born to his parents in Saint Louis. He attended Saint Theresa's parish school for his elementary education. Butler ended his schooling after the eighth grade, taking a job at a printing shop. He resumed his education at age eighteen when he enrolled at Kenrick Preparatory Seminary; a Catholic seminary in Saint Louis. This seminary would become Kenrick-Glennon Seminary, which later relocated to Saint Louis County.

== Career ==
After being ordained a Catholic priest in 1911, Butler was appointed assistant pastor at Saint Lawrence O'Toole church in Saint Louis. Here he began his long career of public service. Butler served as Executive Secretary of the Saint Louis Metropolitan Council of the Society of Saint Vincent de Paul from 1920 to 1963. He founded the Catholic Charities of the Archdiocese of Saint Louis in 1924 and served as president of this organization from 1924 to 1959. In creating Catholic Charities, Butler brought together the church services of homeless shelters, orphanages, employment agencies, and residence homes for the needy under one organization in order to improve the efficiency of these charities.

Butler was appointed pastor of Saint Leo's Catholic Church in Saint Louis in 1931. One of the larger Catholic churches in the city, Butler served there until he retired in 1961. Butler founded the Frederic Ozanam Home, which served as a shelter for poor men, in 1932. He served as executive director of the home from its founding until 1962. He started the Child Center of Our Lady of Grace in 1947. Located in Normandy, Missouri, the center was founded as a treatment and diagnostic facility for troubled youth.

== Awards and honors ==
- Appointed to the rank of Monsignor in 1926.
- Designated a Domestic Prelate by Pope Pius XII in 1943.
- Given the Honorary degree LL.D. by Saint Louis University in 1958.
- Appointed Protonotary apostolic by Pope Paul VI in 1964.
