= John E. Butler =

American lawyer

John Edward Butler (July 6, 1836 – June 25, 1889) was an American politician, lawyer, and newspaper editor. He was a delegate to the 1872 Republican National Convention and editor of the Biddeford Union and Journal newspaper. He served two single-year terms in the Maine Senate (1873–74). Butler, a Free Will Baptist, was born in Berwick, Maine and attended Bowdoin College, apparently without graduating.
