= USS Talita =

Cargo ship of the United States Navy

History

United States
- Name: Jonathan Jennings; Talita
- Namesake: Jonathan Jennings; The star Talitha
- Ordered: As SS Jonathan Jennings
- Builder: Oregon Shipbuilding Corporation
- Laid down: 23 April 1943
- Launched: 12 May 1943
- Acquired: 5 November 1943
- Commissioned: 4 March 1944
- Decommissioned: 9 April 1946
- Stricken: 17 July 1947
- Fate: Transferred to Maritime Commission on 9 July 1947

General characteristics
- Class & type: Acubens-class stores ship
- Displacement: 14,350 tons
- Length: 441 ft 6 in (134.57 m)
- Beam: 56 ft 11 in (17.35 m)
- Draft: 28 ft 4 in (8.64 m)
- Speed: 12.5 knots
- Complement: 214
- Armament: 1 x 5 in (130 mm), 1 x 3 in (76 mm)

USS Talita (AKS-8), an Acubens-class stores ship, is the only ship of the United States Navy to have this name.

Talita was laid down under a Maritime Commission contract as liberty ship SS Jonathan Jennings (MCE hull 2012) on 23 April 1943 at Portland, Oregon, by the Oregon Shipbuilding Corporation; launched on 12 May 1943; sponsored by Mrs. Paul Ryolfson; acquired by the Navy on a bare boat basis from the War Shipping Administration on 5 November 1943; renamed Talita on 13 November 1943; and commissioned on 4 March 1944.

After her conversion into a stores issue ship was completed on 4 March 1944 by the Tampa Shipbuilding Co., Tampa, Florida, she was fitted out and put to sea for a short shakedown cruise. Talita got underway from Balboa, Panama Canal Zone, on 1 May bound for the New Hebrides. However, she was diverted to the Solomons and arrived at Guadalcanal on 1 June. After issuing stores there, she proceeded to the New Hebrides.

Talita departed Espiritu Santo on 11 July, reached Eniwetok after a nine-day voyage, and returned to Espiritu Santo on 11 September. She continued resupply runs from there to Majuro, Eniwetok, Ulithi, and Manus until early March 1945 when she headed for the United States.

Talita arrived at San Francisco on 23 March for an overhaul and sailed one month later for the South Pacific. After calling at Pearl Harbor, she shuttled supplies between Eniwetok, Ulithi, Leyte, and Manus until 20 September when she sailed for the Ryukyus. The ship remained at Okinawa from 25 September to 2 October when she got underway for Japan. After offloading supplies at Wakayama, Hiro Wan, and Matsuyama, she returned to Pearl Harbor on 12 November. The next day, she headed for San Francisco.

Talita remained there from 21 November 1945 to 17 February 1946 when she sailed for Hawaii. She arrived at Pearl Harbor on 25 February, was decommissioned on 9 April, and towed back to San Francisco for disposal. Talita was transferred to the Maritime Commission on 9 July and struck from the Navy list on 17 July 1947.
