= USS John C. Butler =

US Navy destroyer escort (1944–1957)

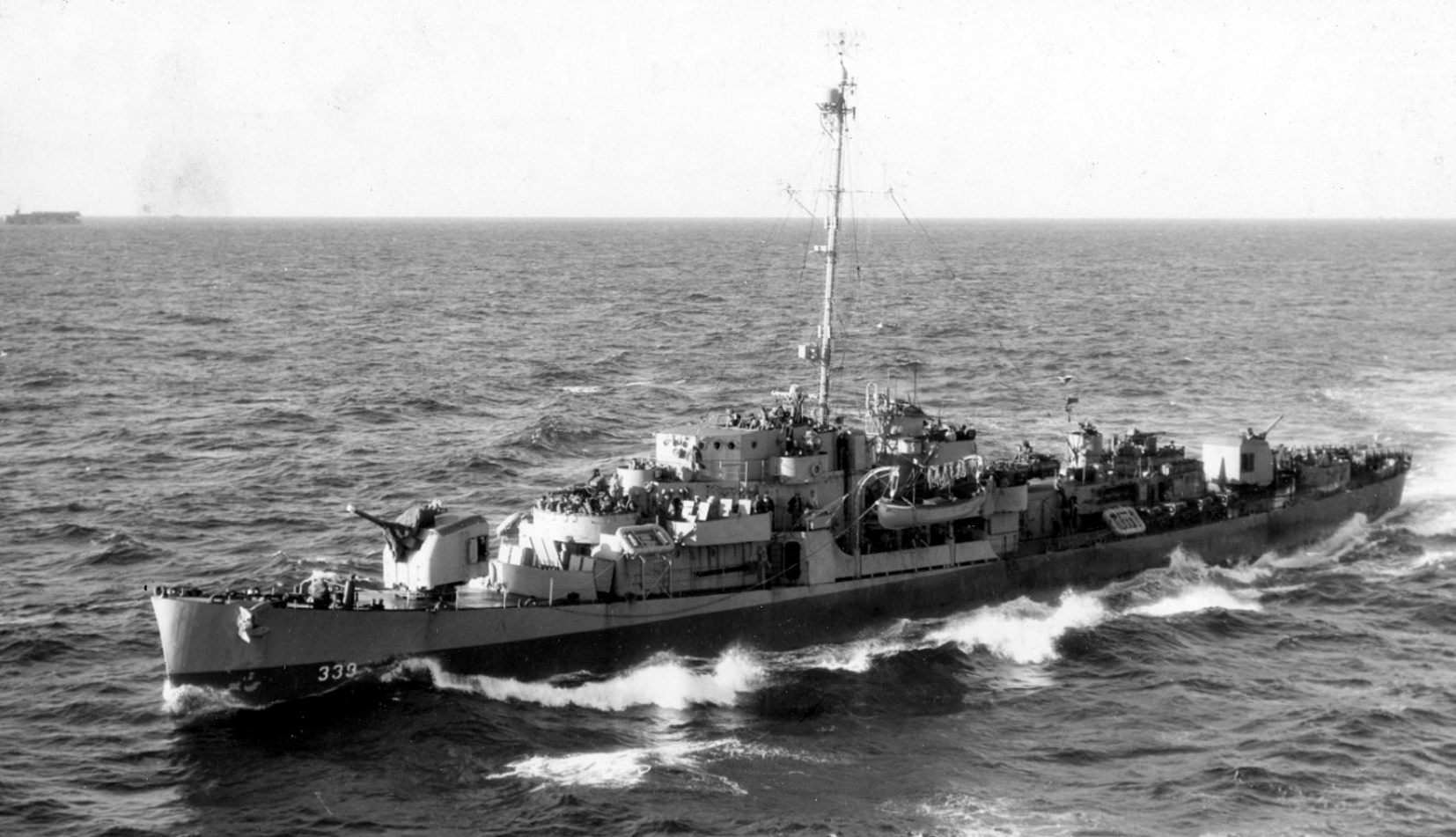
- USS John C. Butler on 1 March 1945

History

United States
- Name: USS John C. Butler
- Namesake: John Clarence Butler
- Builder: Consolidated Steel Corporation
- Laid down: 5 October 1943
- Launched: 12 November 1943
- Commissioned: 31 March 1944
- Decommissioned: 26 June 1946
- Recommissioned: 27 December 1950
- Decommissioned: 18 December 1957
- Stricken: 1 June 1970
- Fate: Sunk as target, 1971

General characteristics
- Class & type: John C. Butler-class destroyer escort
- Displacement: 1,350 long tons (1,372 t)
- Length: 306 ft (93 m)
- Beam: 36 ft 8 in (11.18 m)
- Draft: 9 ft 5 in (2.87 m)
- Installed power: 12,000 shp (8,900 kW)
- Propulsion: 2 × geared steam turbines; 2 × boilers; 2 × shafts
- Speed: 24 kn (28 mph; 44 km/h)
- Range: 6,000 nmi (6,900 mi; 11,000 km) at 12 kn (14 mph; 22 km/h)
- Complement: 186
- Sensors & processing systems: SF multi-use radar
- Armament: 2 × single 5 in (127 mm) guns; 2 × twin 40 mm (1.6 in) AA guns; 10 × single 20 mm (0.79 in) AA guns; 1 × triple 21 in (533 mm) torpedo tubes; 8 × depth charge throwers; 1 × Hedgehog ASW mortar; 2 × depth charge racks

USS John C. Butler (DE-339) was the lead ship of her class of destroyer escorts in the service with the United States Navy from 1944 to 1946. She was recommissioned between 1950 and 1957 and finally sunk as a target in 1971.

== Namesake ==
John Clarence Butler was born on 2 February 1921 in Liberty, Arizona. He enlisted in the United States Naval Reserve as a seaman second class on 19 February 1941 at Long Beach, California. Reporting for active duty at the Naval Reserve Aviation Base at Long Beach, Butler transferred to Naval Air Station, Pensacola, Florida on 27 March. On 3 April, after termination of his enlisted service, he accepted an appointment as an aviation cadet in the Naval Reserve. He received flight training at Pensacola from 4 April-29–July 1941, and reported to the Naval Air Station, Miami for further instruction (1 August). Designated a Naval Aviator on 29 August he was appointment as Ensign in the Naval Reserve on 6 September, before receiving orders to the Advanced Training Group (ACTG), U.S. Pacific Fleet, for active duty, involving flying under instruction on 17 September. Receiving an assignment to the aircraft carrier USS Saratoga, arriving in port at San Diego, Butler flew one of the 43 Douglas SBD Dauntless dive bombers attached to Saratoga's Scouting Squadron Three (VS-3) and Bombing Squadron Three (VB-3).

On 18 April 1942, during the Doolittle Raid Butler piloted aircraft an SBD-3 Dauntless flying off USS Enterprise, searching for any forward deployed Imperial Japanese Navy (IJN) ships that could radio back to Japan to give warning of the raiders. During the scouting mission, he engaged a 125 feet (38 m) long Japanese patrol boat towing a smaller boat "painted white". Attacking in two separate dives, Butler dropped two 100-pound bombs, both of which were duds. Striking the craft with a 500-pound bomb on the port side, his plane received three hits from enemy fire. Disengaging he noticed the smaller craft belching oil and smoke, estimating it later sank. The larger boat remained undamaged.

VB-3 received a transfer from Saratoga to USS Yorktown which left Pearl Harbor on 30 May to intercept the IJN carrier force headed for Midway Island. During the Battle of Midway on the afternoon of 4 June 1942 10 dive-bombers from VB-6 (and 14 from VB-3), took off from Enterprise (Yorktown having been damaged in an earlier Japanese attack) at 17:30. The dive-bomber pilots eventually discovered Hiryū, the fourth and only surviving enemy carrier. VB-6 aircraft attacked first, missing the ship with several bombs. About a dozen Mitsubishi A6M Zero fighters suddenly swarmed in amongst the slower Dauntless dive-bombers. At some point during the melee Butler's aircraft was shot down. He was posthumously awarded the Navy Cross.

== History ==
John C. Butler was laid down by Consolidated Steel Corporation, Ltd., in Orange, Texas, on 5 October 1943; launched on 12 November 1943, sponsored by Mrs. Walter C. Butler, mother of Ensign Butler; and commissioned on 31 March 1944.

=== World War II ===
The new destroyer escort conducted shakedown training off Bermuda before departing Hampton Roads on 5 June 1944 for the Pacific. Sailing via the Panama Canal, she arrived Pearl Harbor on 26 June and engaged in convoy and training operations in July. John C. Butler then departed Pearl Harbor on 9 August screening transports bound for the invasion of the Palau Islands. After seeing them safely to Tulagi, the ship operated with escort carriers out of Manus Island on pre-invasion strikes. Two islands wanted as advance bases for the long-awaited move into the Philippines, Morotai and Peleliu, were stormed on 15 September; and John C. Butler provided anti-submarine and anti-aircraft protection for the supporting carriers. Returning to Manus on 30 September, she replenished in preparation for the Leyte operation in October.

==== Battle of Leyte Gulf, October 1944 ====
The escort vessel sailed with Rear Admiral Ralph A. Ofstie's escort carrier group on 12 October to provide air cover for the massive movement of transports into Leyte Gulf. After the initial landings, the three carrier groups, soon to become famous by their radio code names, "Taffy 1", "Taffy 2", and "Taffy 3", took station east of the Philippines to lend close air support.

The Japanese fleet was closing the Philippines in a last attempt to annihilate the invasion force, with heavy ships designated to break into Leyte Gulf from north and south, and a diversionary fleet of carriers to draw Admiral William F. Halsey's 3rd Fleet off to the North. In the first two actions of the massive Battle of Leyte Gulf which ensued, the Battle of Sibuyan Sea and the Battle of Surigao Strait, the Japanese were badly mauled. But Vice Admiral Takeo Kurita's Center Force still transited San Bernardino Strait the night of 24–25 October, and just after sunrise bore down on the relatively unprotected Taffy 3, including John C. Butler.

The two-hour Battle off Samar which followed has taken a rightful place among the most memorable actions in naval history. The slow escort carriers launched all planes to attack the Japanese cruisers and battleships, and John C. Butler and her sisters laid heavy smoke to confuse enemy batteries. A rain squall provided cover for a turn to the south, and just after 07:30 the destroyers began their gallant torpedo attacks against great odds. Destroyers Johnston, Hoel, and Heermann, and DE Samuel B. Roberts made close-in attacks on cruisers and battleships, forcing them to zig-zag, while aircraft made continuous attacks. Soon after this first attack, John C. Butler turned from the carriers to launch her remaining torpedoes, then exchanged gunfire with a heavy cruiser. The DE continued to fire and dodge heavy-caliber fire until dangerously low on ammunition, then returned to the carrier formation to provide smoke coverage.

Rear Admiral Clifton A. F. Sprague, commander of Taffy 3, later described the next surprising development: "At 0925 my mind was occupied with dodging torpedoes when near the bridge I heard one of the signalmen yell, '... dammit, boys, they're getting away!' I could not believe my eyes, but it looked as if the whole Japanese fleet was indeed retiring.... At best, I had expected to be swimming by this time." The Japanese – damaged and fearing heavier air attack – had indeed reversed course. Though the escort carriers lost one of their number and three escorts, their valiant fight had stopped the Japanese from attacking the transports in Leyte Gulf. However, shortly after the Center Force retreated from the engagement, the first attack of the war from a kamikaze unit fell upon the remaining ships of Taffy 3, sinking a second escort carrier and damaging all but one of the rest.

After rescuing survivors from St. Lo, John C. Butler escorted the surviving carriers of Taffy 3 via Manus to Pearl Harbor, then returned to Manus on 17 December. Departing with escort carriers on 31 December, she protected amphibious transports steaming to the invasion of Luzon. During the voyage through the South China Sea, the ships encountered and drove off determined kamikaze attacks. On the evening of 8 January 1945, John C. Butler and other escorts shot several kamikazes down. She operated off Lingayen Gulf from 9–17 January and screened carriers during massive strikes in support of ground operations. Departing the Luzon coast, she arrived at Ulithi on 23 January to prepare for the next important amphibious landing — Iwo Jima.

==== Iwo Jima and Okinawa ====
The veteran DE took part in rehearsals in the Marianas, and arrived off Iwo Jima on 19 February with an escort carrier group. She again fought off a severe air attack on 21 February. She remained on duty off Iwo Jima until 9 March, when she sailed for Ulithi, having helped to win another important island air base for the eventual attack on Japan.

Okinawa was to be the site of the last and largest of the Pacific amphibious assaults. John C. Butler sailed on 26 March with transports; and, as the troops stormed ashore on 1 April, she resumed her now-familiar screening duties with carrier groups. As the Japanese launched fruitless suicide attacks, the ship escorted carriers into Kerama Retto, rescued downed pilots, and ferried men and material. Transferred to dangerous outer picket duty north of Ie Shima on 20 May, she was attacked by six kamikazes just before sunset. Skillful gunnery accounted for five of the attackers, and John C. Butler sustained damage only to her mast and antennas. She sailed on 27 May for repairs in the Philippines.

The ship returned to Okinawa with a convoy on 4 July, and spent the last month of the long war on convoy duty between that island and the Pacific advance bases. She returned to San Pedro, Los Angeles on 23 November and decommissioned on 26 June 1946, joining the Pacific Reserve Fleet at San Diego, California.

=== Cold War ===
With the outbreak of the Korean War in June 1950, John C. Butler recommissioned on 27 December 1950. Following shakedown, she was assigned to 11th Naval District for the job of training naval reservists on short sea cruises. Thus, she helped maintain trained officers and men to meet the U.S. Navy's cold war commitments. In addition to reserve cruises, she took part in the training program of Fleet Sonar School, San Diego. She decommissioned on 18 December 1957 and re-entered the Reserve Fleet, San Diego. She was eventually sunk as a target in December 1971.

== Awards ==
John C. Butler received five battle stars for World War II service, and was awarded the Presidential Unit Citation for her part in the Battle off Samar.

=== Awards, Citations and Campaign Ribbons ===
Combat Action Ribbon (retroactive)
Presidential Unit Citation
Navy Unit Commendation
American Campaign Medal
Asiatic-Pacific Campaign Medal (with five battle stars)
World War II Victory Medal
National Defense Service Medal
Philippine Liberation Ribbon
