= USS Seid =

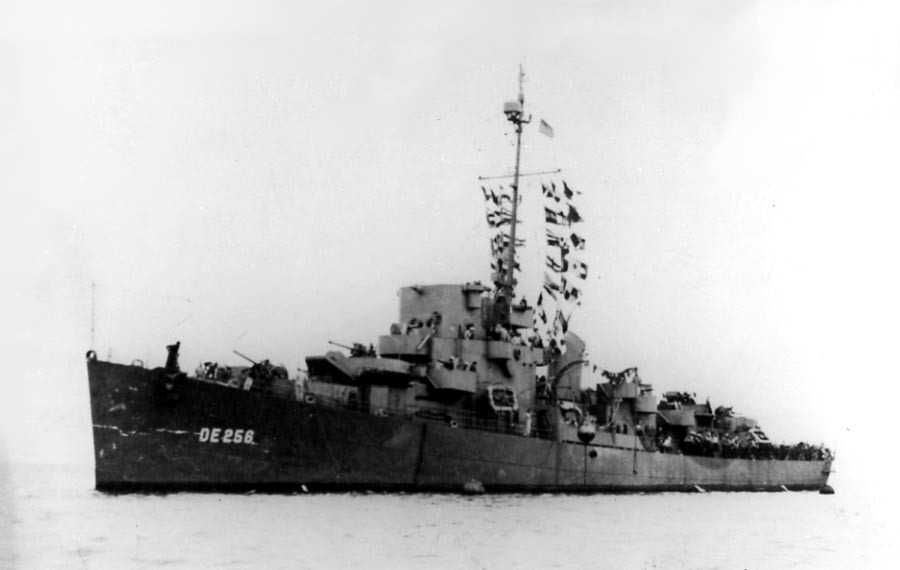
- Seid underway c. 1945

History

United States
- Name: USS Seid
- Builder: Boston Navy Yard
- Laid down: 10 January 1943
- Launched: 22 February 1943
- Commissioned: 11 June 1943
- Decommissioned: 7 December 1945
- Stricken: 8 January 1946
- Honors and awards: 2 battle stars (World War II)
- Fate: Sold for scrapping, 17 April 1947

General characteristics
- Type: Evarts-class destroyer escort
- Displacement: 1,140 long tons (1,158 t) standard; 1,430 long tons (1,453 t) full
- Length: 289 ft 5 in (88.21 m) o/a; 283 ft 6 in (86.41 m) w/l
- Beam: 35 ft 2 in (10.72 m)
- Draft: 11 ft (3.4 m) (max)
- Propulsion: 4 × General Motors Model 16-278A diesel engines with electric drive, 6,000 shp (4,474 kW); 2 screws
- Speed: 19 knots (35 km/h; 22 mph)
- Range: 4,150 nmi (7,690 km)
- Complement: 15 officers and 183 enlisted
- Armament: 3 × single 3"/50 Mk.22 dual purpose guns; 1 × quad 1.1"/75 Mk.2 AA gun; 9 × 20 mm Mk.4 AA guns; 1 × Hedgehog Projector Mk.10 (144 rounds); 8 × Mk.6 depth charge projectors; 2 × Mk.9 depth charge tracks

USS Seid (DE-256) was an Evarts-class destroyer escort of the United States Navy in service from 1943 to 1945. She was scrapped in 1947.

== Design ==
The Evarts-class destroyer escorts were 289 ft 5 in (88.21 m) long overall, and they had a beam of 35 ft 2 in (10.72 m). They had an average draft of 10 ft 1 in (3.07 m) at their full load displacement of 1,416 long tons (1,439 t). Each ship had a normal crew numbered 156 officers and sailors.

Seid was propelled by a pair of diesel motors manufactured by General Motors, which drove a pair of screw propellers. Her propulsion system was rated to produce 6,000 brake horsepower (4,500 kW) for a top speed of 19.5 knots (36.1 km/h; 22.4 mph). Oil storage amounted to between 131 and 197 long tons (133 and 200 t), which allowed a cruising radius of up to 6,000 nautical miles (11,000 km; 6,900 mi) at an economical pace of 10 knots (19 km/h; 12 mph).

The ship's armament consisted of a main battery of three 3-inch (76 mm) /50-caliber guns in individual pivot mounts, which could be used against air or surface targets. These were supported by a light anti-aircraft battery that initially consisted of four 1.1 in (28 mm) /75-caliber guns in a quadruple mount and nine 20 mm (0.79 in) Oerlikon guns. For attacks against submarines, the ship was equipped with a Hedgehog mortar, eight depth charge throwers, and two depth charge racks.

== Service history ==
Seid was laid down on 10 January 1943 by the Boston Navy Yard. The ship was named after Daniel Seid, a naval aviator who was killed in an air raid on 1 February 1942. Seid was launched on 22 February 1943, sponsored by the mother of the ship's namesake, and was commissioned on 11 June 1943.

=== 1943 ===
Following shakedown training off Bermuda, the destroyer escort returned to Boston, Massachusetts, on 31 July 1943. On 16 August, Seid performed her first task for which she had been designed, in searching for an enemy submarine sighted by a Navy blimp off Cape Hatteras. The patrol was fruitless, however, and Seid returned to Norfolk, Virginia, 24 hours later. At Norfolk, Seid served two weeks as a training ship for the crews of other destroyer escorts. On 24 August, she got underway in the screen which escorted eight troop transports to the Panama Canal Zone. The convoy arrived at Coco Solo, Canal Zone, on 30 August, and, after fueling, proceeded through Gatun Locks on 1 September. Seid then proceeded with Osterhaus (DE-164), Parks (DE-165), and Bebas (DE-10) to Nouméa, New Caledonia, via the Galapagos and Society Islands. From Bora Bora, Society Islands, Seid steamed alone, reporting for duty to the 3rd Fleet Commander at Nouméa on 29 September.

On 21 October, Seid was escorting Stoney Point to Espiritu Santo. At approximately 2000 hours, a message was received from Stoney Point stating that she had just passed a man in the water. Upon returning to the point and illuminating the area with search lights, it was discovered that the man floating in the water was attached to Seid. Though surrounded by sharks and supported only by a life belt, the man was recovered uninjured. Upon questioning, it was learned that he had fallen asleep on the fantail and fell off the ship as she rolled. On 5 December, Seid, approximately six miles south of Tulagi in the Solomons, made sound contact with a suspected submarine. An attack was made with hedgehogs, and the ship's course was altered to avoid passing over the pattern. The ship swung top slowly, however, for five seconds after the pattern hit the water, a violent underwater explosion knocked out Seid's sound gear. Seid then stayed clear of the area so as not to interfere with the sonic efficiency of other anti-submarine vessels. No further contact was made, and there was no evidence of damage to a submarine. After an hour's search, the ships proceeded to nearby Port Purvis on Florida Island.

=== 1944 ===
On 1 January 1944, after repairs at Havannah Harbor, Efate, New Caledonia, Seid got underway to Nouméa and resumed her escort duties with the 3rd Fleet. A week later, she sustained severe damage to frames, longitudinals, and equipment during a typhoon. While serious, the damage was not sufficient to make the ship unseaworthy. She continued her escorting duties as scheduled, except, having been blown off course, for missing a rendezvous with Token (AM-126). Seid arrived at Port Purvis, Florida Island, on 23 January for storm damage repair.

Seid next resumed her escort duties to and from Guadalcanal, Espiritu Santo, Nouméa, Tutuba Island, Florida Island, Savo Island, and Rua Sura Island until 12 April when she received orders to proceed to Pearl Harbor. After a short stop in Hawaii, Seid got underway for the west coast, arriving at the Mare Island Navy Yard on 25 April. Seid steamed out of San Francisco, California, on 2 June and proceeded, in company with Carlson (DE-9), to Pearl Harbor. On 8 June, Seid was engaged in conducting post-repair trials and in training. Collateral duties included training submarines and escorting carriers on training missions. During this time, from 4 to 23 July, Seid made one escort run from Pearl Harbor to Eniwetok and back.

On 8 August, Seid was attached to the Pacific Fleet Service Force and proceeded in convoy to Eniwetok, where she was assigned to the Commander, 3rd Fleet for hunter-killer antisubmarine operations on the 16th. Seid stood into Ulithi Harbor, Caroline Islands, on 27 October. There, Seid was shifted to Task Force 57 for escort operations. On 1 November, the destroyer escort proceeded to Kossol Passage, West Caroline Islands, arriving the next day. On 3 November, Seid engaged in repair work which was completed on the 12th, in spite of a typhoon on the 7th.

=== 1945 ===
On Christmas Day 1944, Seid proceeded to Peleliu Island and joined Task Unit 94.5.9, assigned to make the invasion of Fais Island. It was thought that the enemy had been broadcasting information on American ship movements from the small island. Seid carried out anti-submarine patrols during the invasion. On 5 January 1945, the landing was successfully accomplished, and Seid returned to Kossol Passage to resume escort operations. After an availability period from 1 to 10 February, Seid resumed escort duty. From 23 February to 2 March, Seid escorted a 47-ship convoy from Eniwetok to Ulithi.

On 27 March, Seid stood out of Saipan Harbor to escort Transport Squadron 15 to Okinawa Shima. Upon arrival at Okinawa on 1 April, Seid acted as anti-submarine screen for Task Unit 51.2.8 as they feigned landings on the southern tip of the island. On 4 April, Seid's sound gear became inoperative, and she was detached to proceed to Kerama Retto for repairs. While at anchor there on 6 April, the destroyer escort's crew shot down an attacking aircraft. On 9 April, sonar repairmen determined that it would be impossible to repair Seid's equipment with the facilities at hand, and Seid was assigned to a patrol station north of Okinawa Shima. On 12 April, Seid was credited with the shooting down of four Japanese planes, at ranges from 50 to 3,000 yards. In one nine-minute period, the destroyer escort shot down two of them, while evading five aerial torpedoes.

On 21 May, after repairs at Apra Harbor, Guam, Seid reported to Commander, Submarine Force, Pacific Fleet. Assigned to Task Group 17.10, Seid operated out of Apra Harbor as escort and training ship for submarines for the remainder of the war. On 18 September, 30 naval enlisted passengers and three officers reported on board as the ship was preparing to get underway for the United States. The destroyer escort arrived at San Pedro, Los Angeles, on 5 October, disembarked her passengers, and began preparation for decommissioning. Seid was decommissioned on 14 December 1945, and struck from the Navy List on 8 January 1946. Sold to the Pacific Bridge Co., San Francisco, California, in January of the next year, she was scrapped on 17 April 1947.

== Awards ==
Seid received two battle stars for World War II service.
