= USS Hoggatt Bay =

Casablanca-class escort carrier of the U.S. Navy

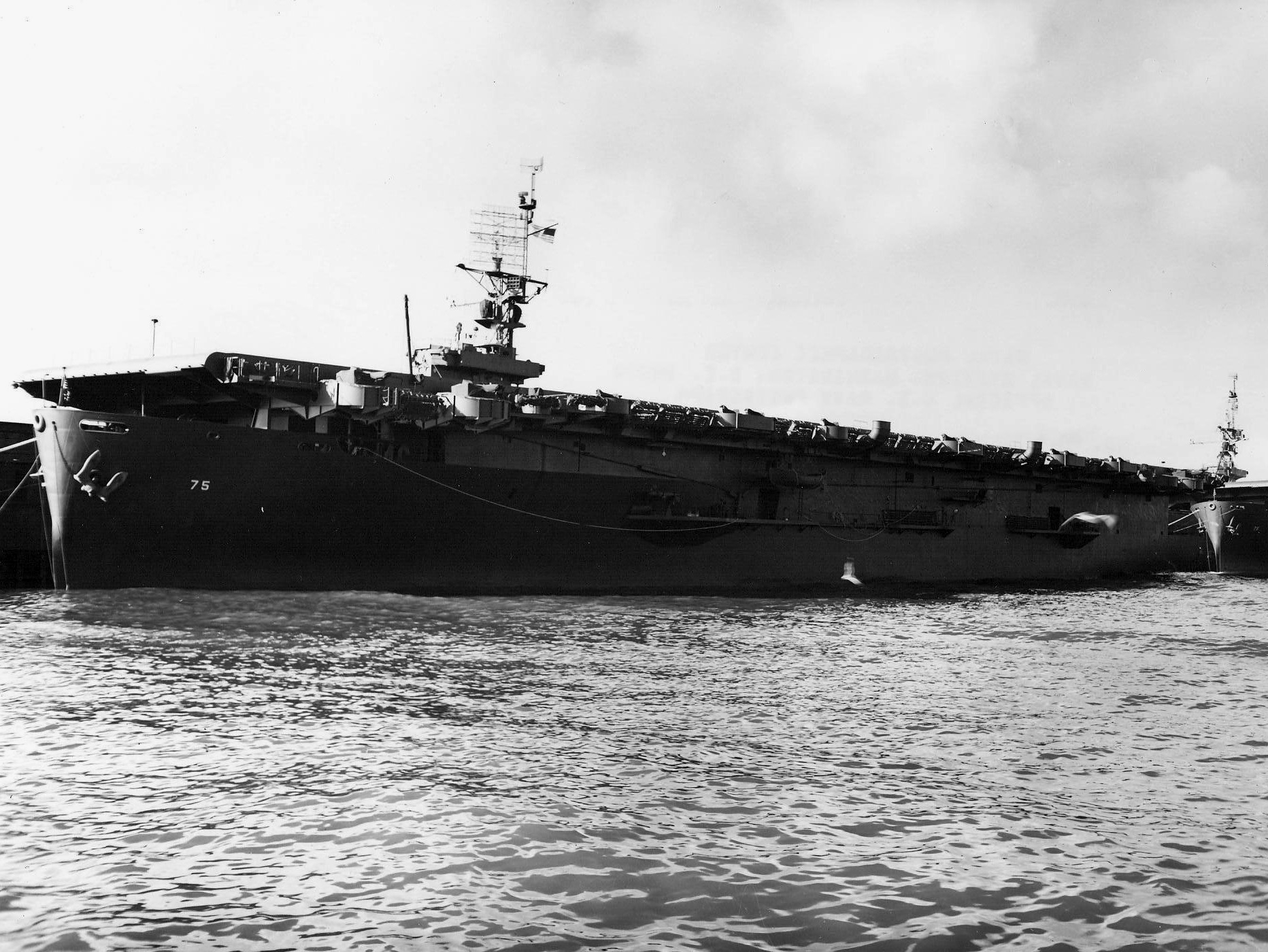
- USS Hoggatt Bay anchored off of Astoria, Oregon shortly after commissioning, January 1944.

History

United States
- Name: Hoggatt Bay
- Namesake: Hoggatt Bay, Baranof Island, Alaska
- Ordered: as a Type S4-S2-BB3 hull, MC hull 1112
- Awarded: 18 June 1942
- Builder: Kaiser Shipyards
- Laid down: 17 August 1943
- Launched: 4 December 1943
- Commissioned: 11 January 1944
- Decommissioned: 20 July 1946
- Stricken: 1 September 1959
- Identification: CVE-75 (1943–55); CVHE-75 (1955–59); AKV-25 (1959)
- Nickname(s): Hokey Pokey Maru
- Honors and awards: 5 Battle stars
- Fate: Scrapped in May 1960

General characteristics
- Class & type: Casablanca-class escort carrier
- Displacement: 8,188 long tons (8,319 t) (standard); 10,902 long tons (11,077 t) (full load)
- Length: 512 ft 3 in (156.13 m) (oa); 490 ft (150 m) (wl); 474 ft (144 m) (fd)
- Beam: 65 ft 2 in (19.86 m); 108 ft (33 m) (extreme width)
- Draft: 20 ft 9 in (6.32 m) (max)
- Installed power: 4 × Babcock & Wilcox boilers; 9,000 shp (6,700 kW)
- Propulsion: 2 × Skinner Unaflow reciprocating steam engines; 2 × screws
- Speed: 19 knots (35 km/h; 22 mph)
- Range: 10,240 nmi (18,960 km; 11,780 mi) at 15 kn (28 km/h; 17 mph)
- Complement: Total: 910 – 916 officers and men; Embarked Squadron: 50 – 56; Ship's Crew: 860
- Armament: As designed: 1 × 5 in (127 mm)/38 cal dual-purpose gun; 4 × twin 40 mm (1.57 in) Bofors anti-aircraft guns; 12 × 20 mm (0.79 in) Oerlikon anti-aircraft cannons; Varied, ultimate armament: 1 × 5 in (127 mm)/38 cal dual-purpose gun; 8 × twin 40 mm (1.57 in) Bofors anti-aircraft guns; 20 × 20 mm (0.79 in) Oerlikon anti-aircraft cannons
- Aircraft carried: 27
- Aviation facilities: 1 × catapult; 2 × elevators

Service record
- Part of: United States Pacific Fleet (1944–1946); Atlantic Reserve Fleet (1946–1959)
- Operations: Mariana and Palau Islands campaign; Philippines campaign; Battle of Leyte; Invasion of Lingayen Gulf; Battle of Okinawa; Operation Magic Carpet

USS Hoggatt Bay (CVE-75) was the twenty-first of fifty Casablanca-class escort carriers built for the United States Navy during World War II. She was named after Hoggatt Bay, which was named in 1895 by Lieutenant commander E. K. Moore after Wilford Bacon Hoggatt, an ensign serving in Moore's party at the time. The bay is located within Baranof Island, part of the Alexander Archipelago, which at the time was a part of the Territory of Alaska. She was launched in December 1943, commissioned in January 1944, and she served in the Mariana and Palau Islands campaign, the Invasion of Lingayen Gulf as a part of the Philippines campaign, as well as the Battle of Okinawa. Post-war, she participated in Operation Magic Carpet, repatriating U.S. servicemen from around the Pacific. She was decommissioned in July 1946, being mothballed in the Atlantic Reserve Fleet. Ultimately, she was broken up in 1960.

== Design and description ==
A side profile of the design of Thetis Bay.

Hoggatt Bay was a Casablanca-class escort carrier, the most numerous type of aircraft carriers ever built. Built to stem heavy losses during the Battle of the Atlantic, they came into service in late 1943, by which time the U-boat threat was already in retreat. Although some did see service in the Atlantic, the majority were utilized in the Pacific, ferrying aircraft, providing logistics support, and conducting close air support for the island-hopping campaigns. The Casablanca-class carriers were built on the standardized Type S4-S2-BB3 hull, a lengthened variant of the Doyen-class hull, and specifically designed to be mass-produced using welded prefabricated sections. This allowed them to be produced at unprecedented speeds: the final ship of her class, Munda, was delivered to the Navy just 101 days after the laying of her keel.

Hoggatt Bay was 512 ft 3 in (156.13 m) long overall (490 ft (150 m) at the waterline), had a beam of 65 ft 2 in (19.86 m), and a draft of 20 ft 9 in (6.32 m). She displaced 8,188 long tons (8,319 t) standard, which increased to 10,902 long tons (11,077 t) with a full load. To carry out flight operations, the ship had a 257 ft (78 m) hangar deck and a 474 ft (144 m) flight deck. Her compact size necessitated the installation of an aircraft catapult at her bow, and there were two aircraft elevators to facilitate movement of aircraft between the flight and hangar deck: one each fore and aft.

She was powered by four Babcock & Wilcox Express D boilers that raised 285 psi (1,970 kPa) of steam at 577 °F (303 °C). The steam generated by these boilers fed two Skinner Unaflow reciprocating steam engines, delivering 9,000 hp (6,700 kW) to two propeller shafts. This allowed her to reach speeds of 19 kn (35 km/h; 22 mph), with a cruising range of 10,240 nmi (18,960 km; 11,780 mi) at 15 kn (28 km/h; 17 mph). For armament, one 5 in (127 mm)/38 caliber dual-purpose gun was mounted on the stern. Additional anti-aircraft defense was provided by eight Bofors 40 mm (1.57 in) anti-aircraft guns in single mounts and twelve Oerlikon 20 mm (0.79 in) cannons mounted around the perimeter of the deck. By 1945, Casablanca-class carriers had been modified to carry twenty Oerlikon cannons and sixteen Bofors guns; the doubling of the latter was accomplished by putting them into twin mounts. Sensors onboard consisted of a SG surface-search radar and a SK air-search radar.

Although Casablanca-class escort carriers were intended to function with a crew of 860 and an embarked squadron of 50 to 56, the exigencies of wartime often necessitated the inflation of the crew count. They were designed to operate with 27 aircraft, but the hangar deck could accommodate much more during transport or training missions. During the Mariana and Palau Islands campaign and the Invasion of Lingayen Gulf, she carried 16 FM-2 Wildcat fighters and 12 TBM-1C Avenger torpedo bombers for a total of 28 aircraft.

== Construction ==
Her construction was awarded to Kaiser Shipbuilding Company, Vancouver, Washington under a Maritime Commission (MC) contract, on 18 June 1942. The escort carrier was laid down on 17 August 1943 under the name Hoggatt Bay, as part of a tradition which named escort carriers after bays or sounds in Alaska. She was laid down as MC hull 1112, the twenty-first of a series of fifty Casablanca-class escort carriers. She received the classification symbol CVE-75, indicating that she was the seventy-fifth escort carrier to be commissioned into the United States Navy. She was launched on 4 December 1943 and sponsored by Mrs. Esther Irene Sundvik, the wife of a Victor Sundvik, a shipwright at the yard; transferred to the Navy and commissioned on the morning of 11 January 1944, with Captain William Vincent Saunders in command.

== Service history ==
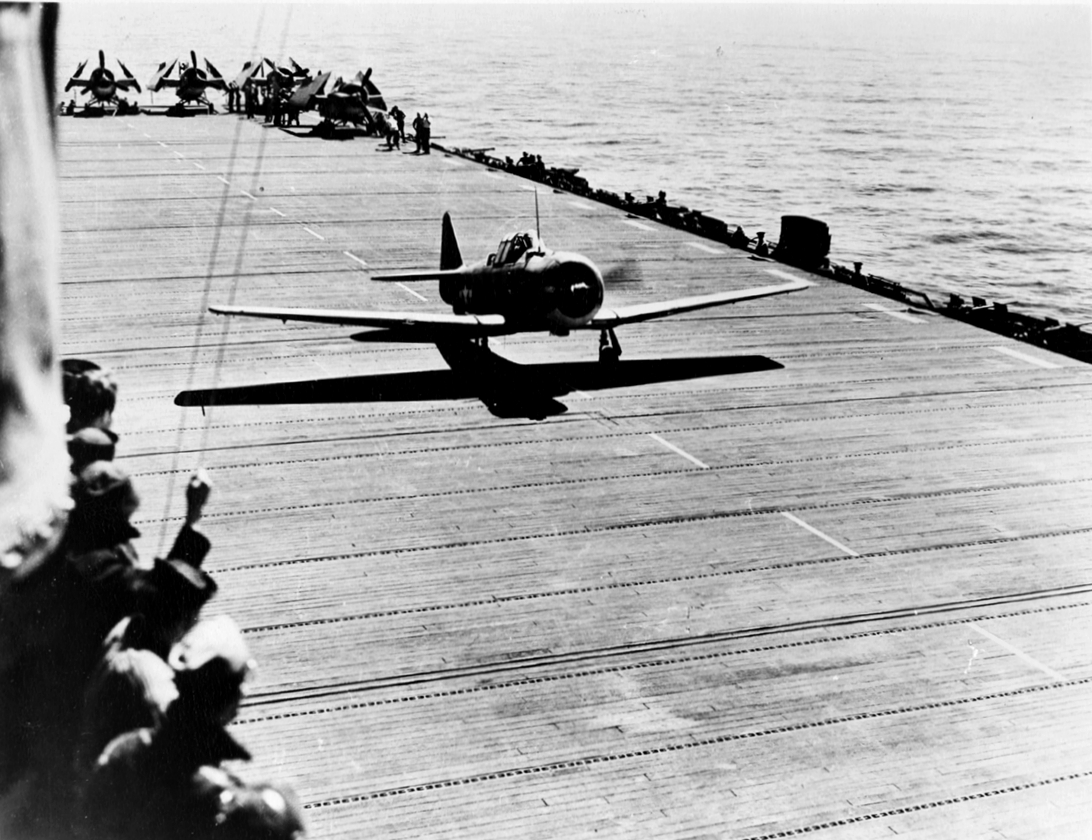
A T-6 Texan trainer aircraft takes off from the flight deck of Hoggatt Bay, sometime prior to 26 March 1944.

Upon being commissioned, Hoggatt Bay spent the month of January undergoing outfitting at U.S. Naval Ship Yard Tongue Point, Astoria, Oregon. She then underwent a shakedown cruise down the West Coast, heading to Naval Air Station North Island, San Diego, California. She arrived at San Diego on 23 February, and spent the early half of March conducting gunnery and air-defense drills off of the California coast. She left San Diego on 10 March, ferrying a complement of aircraft and passengers to Pearl Harbor, arriving on 16 March, returning to the West Coast on 25 March, where she took on her aircraft contingent, Composite Squadron (VC) 14, on 26 March. On 27 March, aircraft operations began, with Saunders making the first landing. She spent April undergoing an overhaul, heading westwards on 1 May to conduct antisubmarine operations around the vicinity of Emirau Island in the Bismarck Archipelago.

=== Marianas and Palau Islands campaign ===
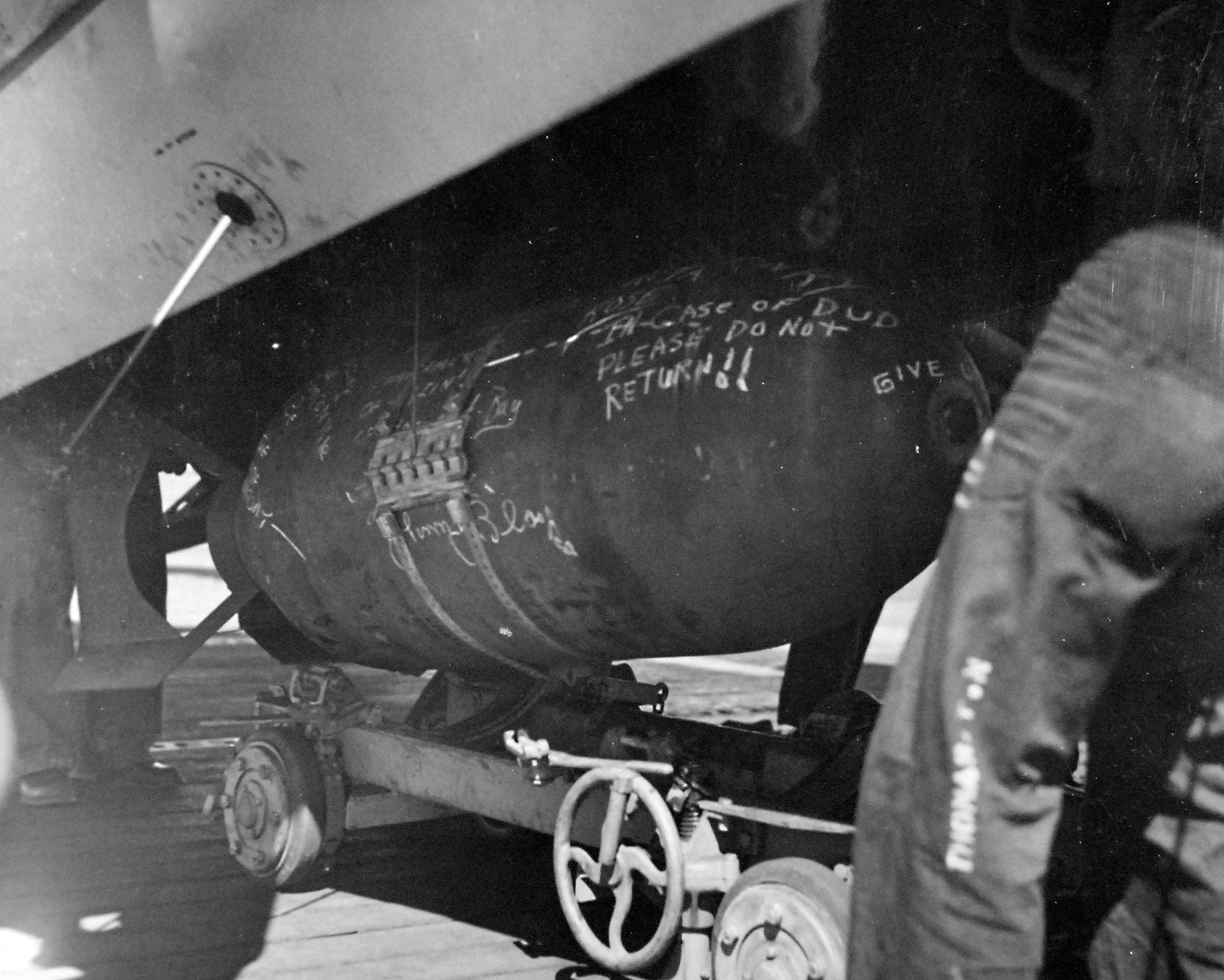
A 2,000 pounds (910 kg) bomb photographed being loaded onto an Avenger on the flight deck of Hoggatt Bay.

Stopping at Pearl Harbor on 8 May, Hoggatt Bay then proceeded for Majuro Atoll in the Marshall Islands on 11 May, assigned to Escort Division (CortDiv) 39, otherwise known as Task Unit 16.14.6. En route, her aircraft spotted a possible submarine signature on 16 May, which they attacked with little apparent result. She moored at Majuro from 17 to 21 May, before departing on 22 May to be a part of an antisubmarine patrol, operating south of Truk Atoll of the Caroline Islands. Navy codebreakers had intercepted Japanese communications indicating the establishment of a seven submarine scouting line (referred to as the NA line), stationed approximately 120 miles (190 km) northeast in the Admiralty Islands in order to safeguard against a possible thrust towards the Palau Islands. By 26 May, when Hoggatt Bay rendezvoused with the division, it had already sunk five Japanese submarines, four of them from the NA line. With Hoggatt Bay's escorting destroyers joining in, the group formed Task Group 30.4, a dedicated antisubmarine hunter-killer formation. On the early morning of 31 May, the Buckley-class destroyer escort England claimed her sixth submarine kill in thirteen days.

On 3 June, Task Group 30.4 moored at Manus in the Admiralty Islands to restock and replenish. Putting back to sea on 4 June, the task group received an aerial contact of a surfaced submarine to the north of its search area on 8 June. Thus, the task group proceeded northwards, and on 10 June, one of Hoggatt Bay's Wildcats sighted an oil slick approximately 8 miles (13 km) west of the escort carrier. The Fletcher-class destroyer Taylor was dispatched to investigate, and soon received a strong sonar contact, the Japanese submarine Ro-111. Taylor dropped two depth charges, and at 15:41, the submarine surfaced 2,500 yards (2,300 m) in front of the destroyer. It was quickly engaged by Taylor's guns, with the submarine sustaining heavy damage before diving again at 15:46. After another round of depth charges, two large underwater explosions were heard at 15:58, with a large air bubble rising up to the surface afterwards, confirming the submarine's destruction.

On 19 June, Hoggatt Bay returned to Manus, before proceeding to Eniwetok in the Marshalls, staying there for a period of four days to replenish. On 1 July, the escort carrier set out to conduct another antisubmarine patrol. Shortly after midnight, on July 19, one of VC-14's aircraft spotted a surface signature, the Japanese submarine I-5. The Evarts-class destroyer escort Wyman (DE-38) and the Evarts-class Reynolds (DE- 42) were dispatched to investigate, with Wyman receiving a clear sonar contact. As the destroyer escorts dropped their second round of depth charges, a large explosion was felt, shattering I-5, the force of which shattered the lights on Wyman as she went in for a third round.

After replenishing at Eniwetok from 22 to 25 July, Hoggatt Bay set out for her third antisubmarine patrol on 26 July. At 17:31 in the evening of 28 July, a lookout spotted a surfacing submarine, what was probably the Japanese submarine I-55 (1943), approximately 8 miles (13 km) to Hoggatt Bay's starboard. The surfacing may have been accidental, or the submarine's crew may have been unaware of its position, as no personnel were observed manning the deck guns throughout the course of the engagement. Wyman and Reynolds were sent to intercept the submarine, with Wyman turning to fire its guns, shelling the submarine for a period of two minutes, whilst Reynolds charged in to drop depth charges, a procedure that was halted due to Wyman's precise battery. As Reynolds approached and the submarine sank below the surface, a series of explosions were heard, and an oil slick formed at the surface.

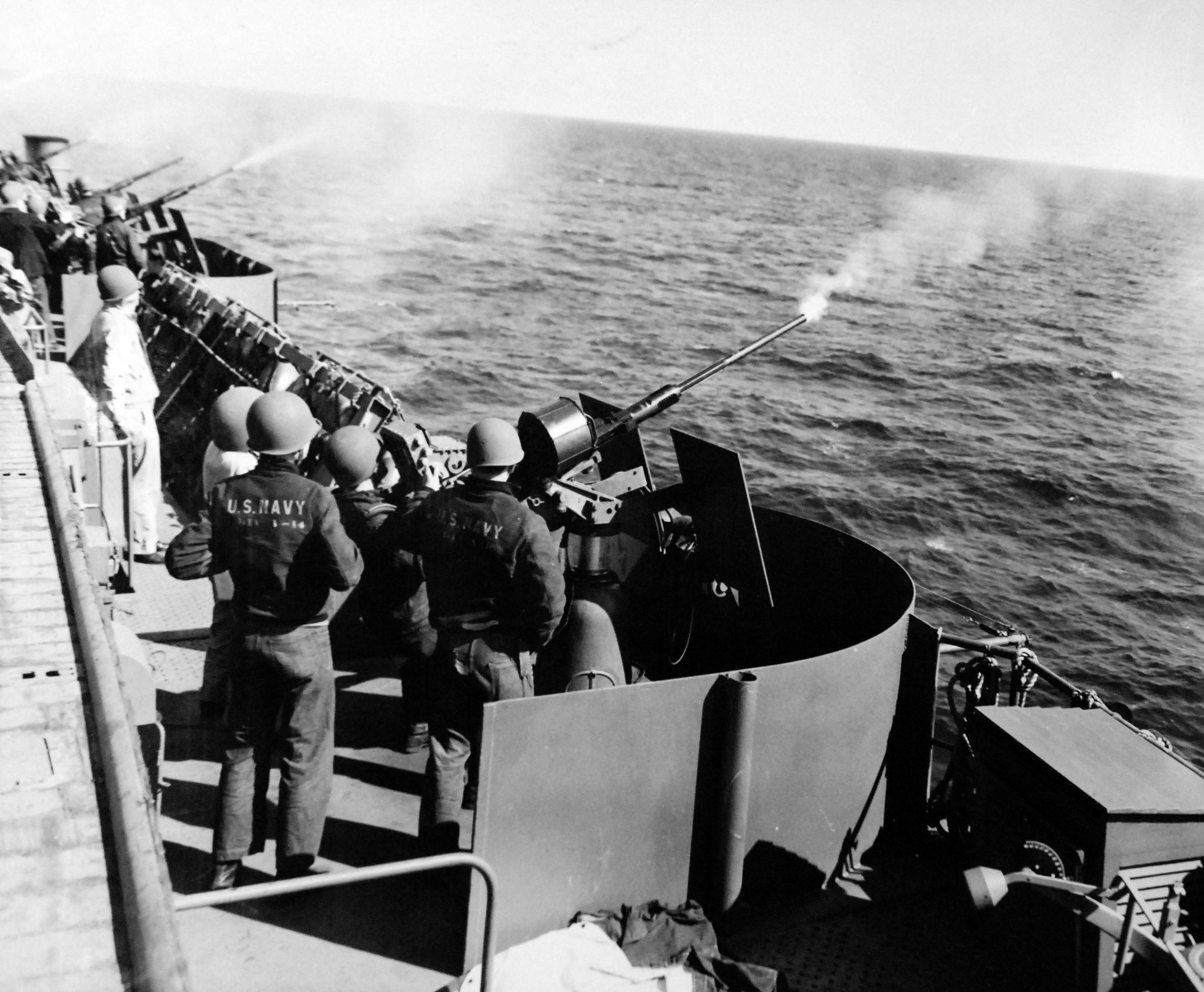
Gunnery drills conducted using Hoggatt Bay's 20 mm Oerlikon cannons.

After finishing her patrol, Hoggatt Bay was detached from Task Group 30.4 and spent August in replenishment at Eniwetok and Kwajalein, before arriving at Manus as a part of the newly formed antisubmarine Task Group 30.7, escorted by the Evarts-class destroyer escorts Steele, Bebas, and Seid, as well as the Cannon-class destroyer escort Samuel S. Miles. The task group was assigned to antisubmarine operations protecting the various ships that were engaged in the Battle of Peleliu and the Battle of Angaur, a task which it conducted through September and October. At 03:11 in the early morning of 3 October, the radar operators of Hoggatt Bay detected a surface signature approximately 20,000 yards (18,000 m) away from the carrier. Samuel S. Miles was detached to investigate, and discovered it to be the Japanese submarine I-177. As the destroyer escort closed to within 5,000 yards (4,600 m), the submarine dove, and thirteen minutes later, having established sonar contact, Samuel S. Miles fired her first volley using her Hedgehog mortars. Following the second run, a series of three large explosions rocked the destroyer escort, communicating the submarine's destruction.

=== Philippines campaign ===
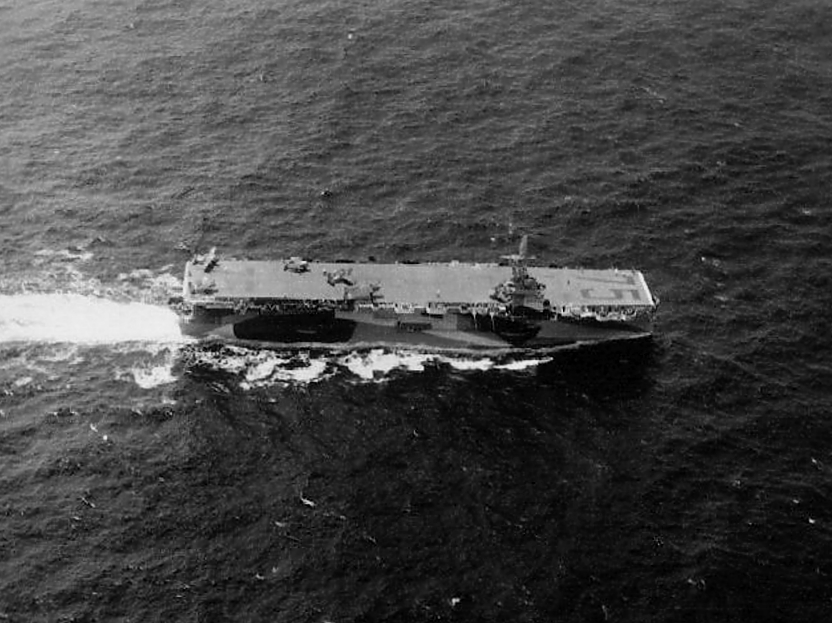
Hoggatt Bay underway at sea, circa 1945. Note the three aircraft positioned on her flight deck.

Hoggatt Bay replenished at Manus from 9 to 12 October, before departing for Palau. She served as an escort for the Cleveland-class light cruiser Houston and the Baltimore-class cruiser Canberra, both of whom had been damaged by aerial torpedo hits during the Battle of Formosa. Hoggatt Bay and her escorts served as a deterrent against submarine attack, and was credited with thwarting at least one attempt to strike the damaged cruisers.

After spending the latter half of October and the beginning of November undergoing replenishment and maintenance at Ulithi, she spent November providing an air screen and conducting antisubmarine patrols for ships operating in support of the ongoing Battle of Leyte. On 29 November, whilst moored at Manus, VC-14 was rotated off the carrier, and Composite Squadron (VC) 88 came aboard the carrier. She spent December conducting amphibious exercises in Huon Gulf in preparation for the planned Invasion of Lingayen Gulf, a task assigned to Task Force 77, which Hoggatt Bay joined at Manus. On 22 December, Captain Josephus Asa Briggs assumed command of Hoggatt Bay whilst she was replenishing at Manus. On 27 December, Hoggatt Bay, as well as the rest of Task Force 77, left Manus for Luzon. Pausing at Kossol Roads on 31 December, the formation saw its first of many kamikaze attacks on 3 January 1945, with a plane shot down just 1,000 yards (910 m) from Hoggatt Bay.

As the kamikaze threat intensified, Hoggatt Bay's fighters were scrambled almost constantly. However, it was not until 13 January that she found herself directly menaced, after a kamikaze, aiming for her sister ship Tulagi and dissuaded by heavy anti-aircraft fire, switched its destination for Hoggatt Bay. As it dove, it was greeted by a direct hit from her 5-inch gun, which tore the plane into shreds. After arriving in Lingayen Gulf on 6 January, the air contingent of Hoggatt Bay began conducting close air support for the landing infantry. On 15 January, an Avenger, piloted by VC-88's commander, Lieutenant commander E. N. Webb, found itself unable to release one of its 500 pounds (230 kg) bombs during a close air support mission. As the Avenger came to a stop on Hoggatt Bay's flight deck, the bomb detonated, killing thirteen onboard and wounding fourteen others. A fire broke out, but was quickly extinguished. Harder to remedy was the noticeably concave flight deck, but nonetheless, flight operations resumed within three hours.

=== Battle of Okinawa ===
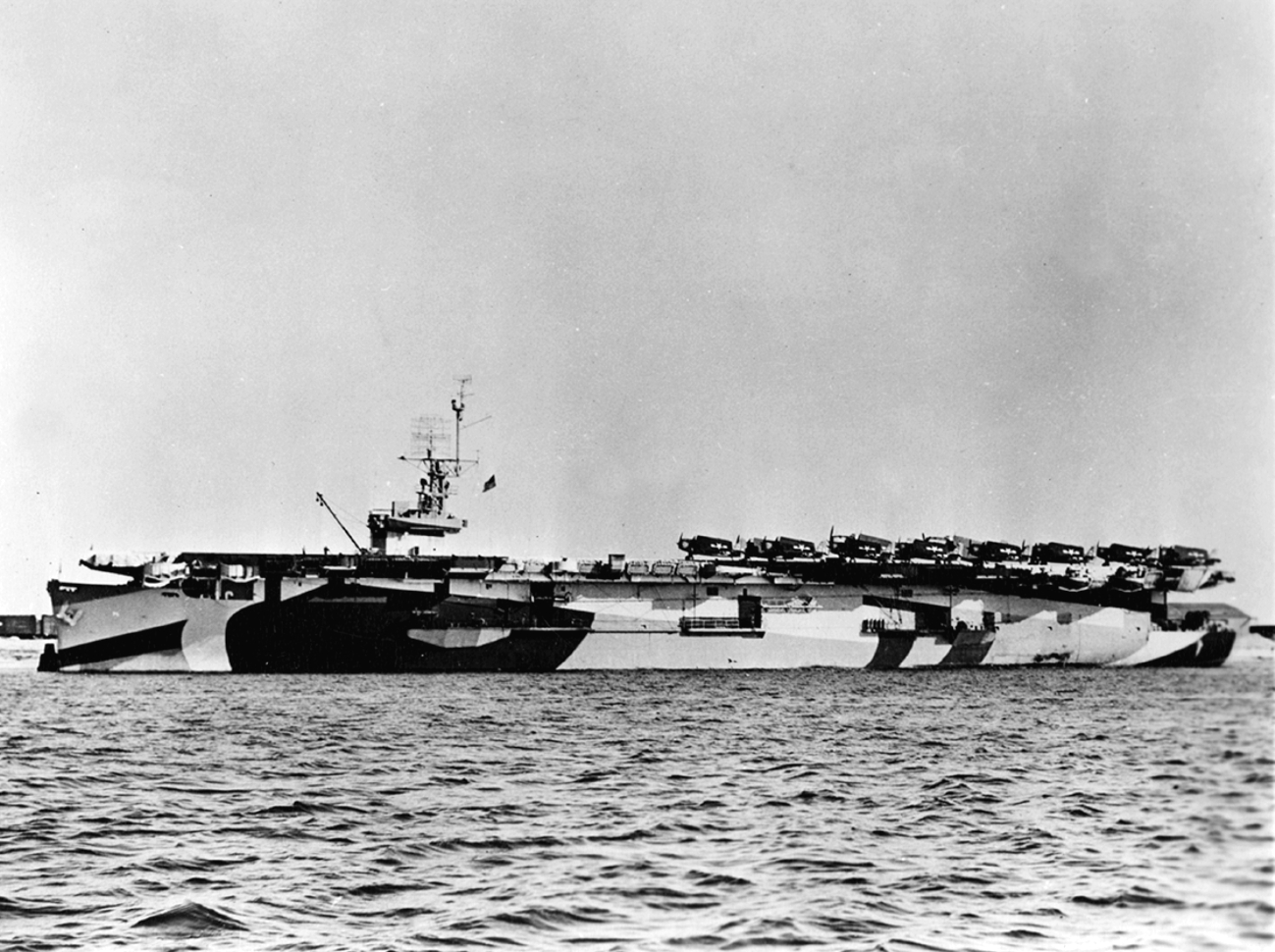
Hoggatt Bay at anchor, circa 1945. She is painted in Camouflage Measure 32, Design 12A.

Hoggatt Bay was ordered to retire to Ulithi on 17 January, arriving on 23 January. There, her aircraft contingent was detached, and she was sent back to the West Coast for further repairs, overhaul, and conversion into a proper flagship, arriving back at San Diego on 15 February. On 2 April, Rear Admiral Harold M. Martin, commander of Carrier Division 23, raised his flag over the vessel. On 6 April, she departed the West Coast for Pearl Harbor, arriving on 13 April. There, she took on a load of aircraft and vehicles, which she unloaded at Guam in the Mariana Islands on 28 April. On 1 May, she embarked Composite Squadron (VC) 99 at Saipan, and after a short period of exercises, she departed on 8 May for Okinawa, in support of the ongoing battle.

On 12 May, Hoggatt Bay commenced air operations over southern Okinawa, conducting a variety of services, such as providing air screening, photographic reconnaissance, supply drops for isolated units, as well as generalized close air support. She kept up this work throughout May and June, with only brief stops at Kerama Retto for replenishment. On 5 June, she braved Typhoon Connie, in which the carrier rolled up to 27°, and gusts of up to 100 knots (190 km/h; 120 mph) were observed. On 7 June, Hoggatt Bay was attributed with shooting down a kamikaze gunning for her sister ship Sargent Bay. During the same action, a different kamikaze, aiming for yet another of Hoggatt Bay's sisters, Natoma Bay, was shot down just 50 yards (46 m) off of Hoggatt Bay's starboard bow. By the time Hoggatt Bay had retired from operations on 24 June, VC-99 had conducted 1,327 sorties, dropped 140 tonnes (140 long tons; 150 short tons) of bombs, and fired more than a thousand rockets.

=== Post-war ===
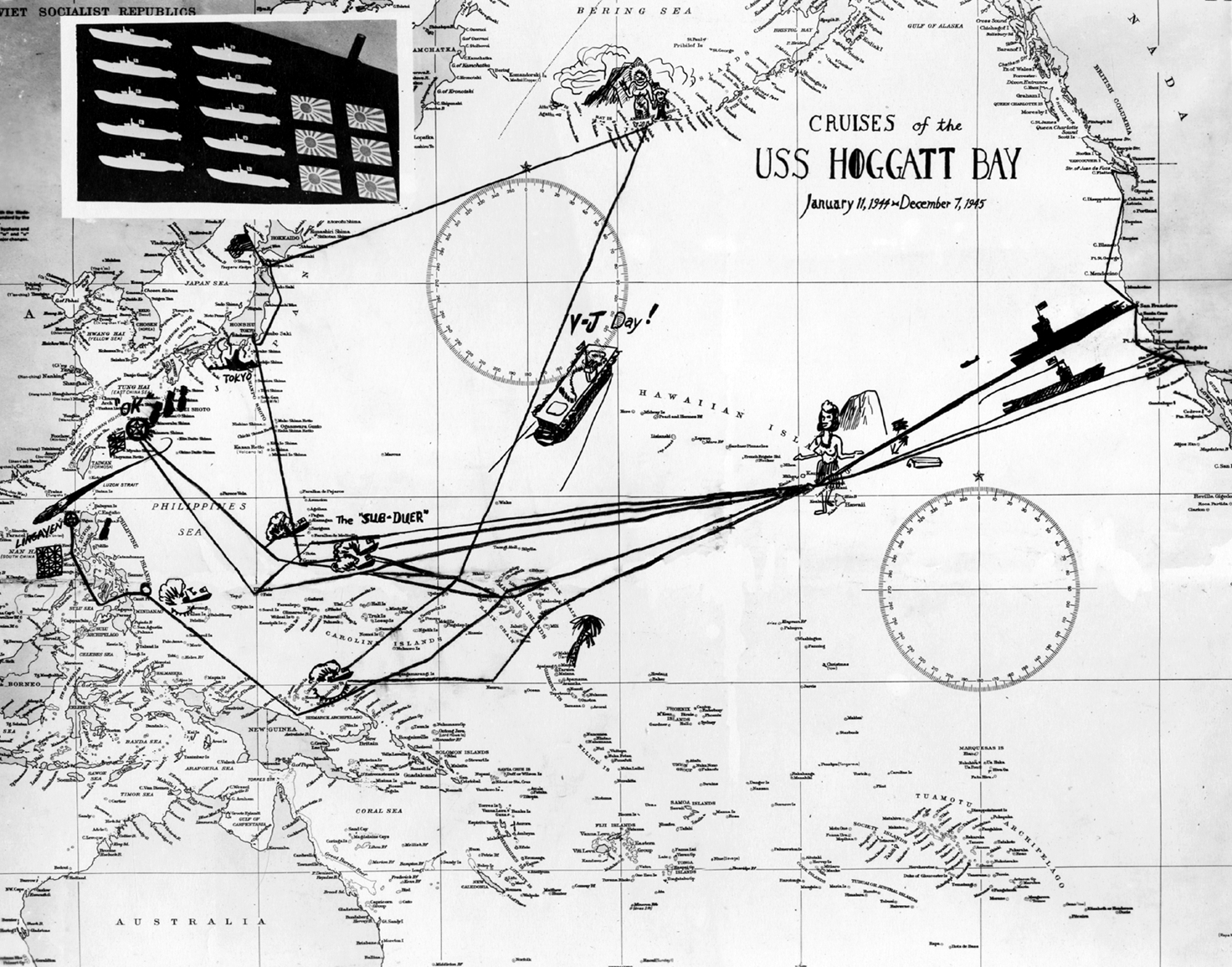
The track chart of Hoggatt Bay. The icons at the top-left indicate ten submarine kills, whilst the Rising Sun Flags indicate six aircraft kills.

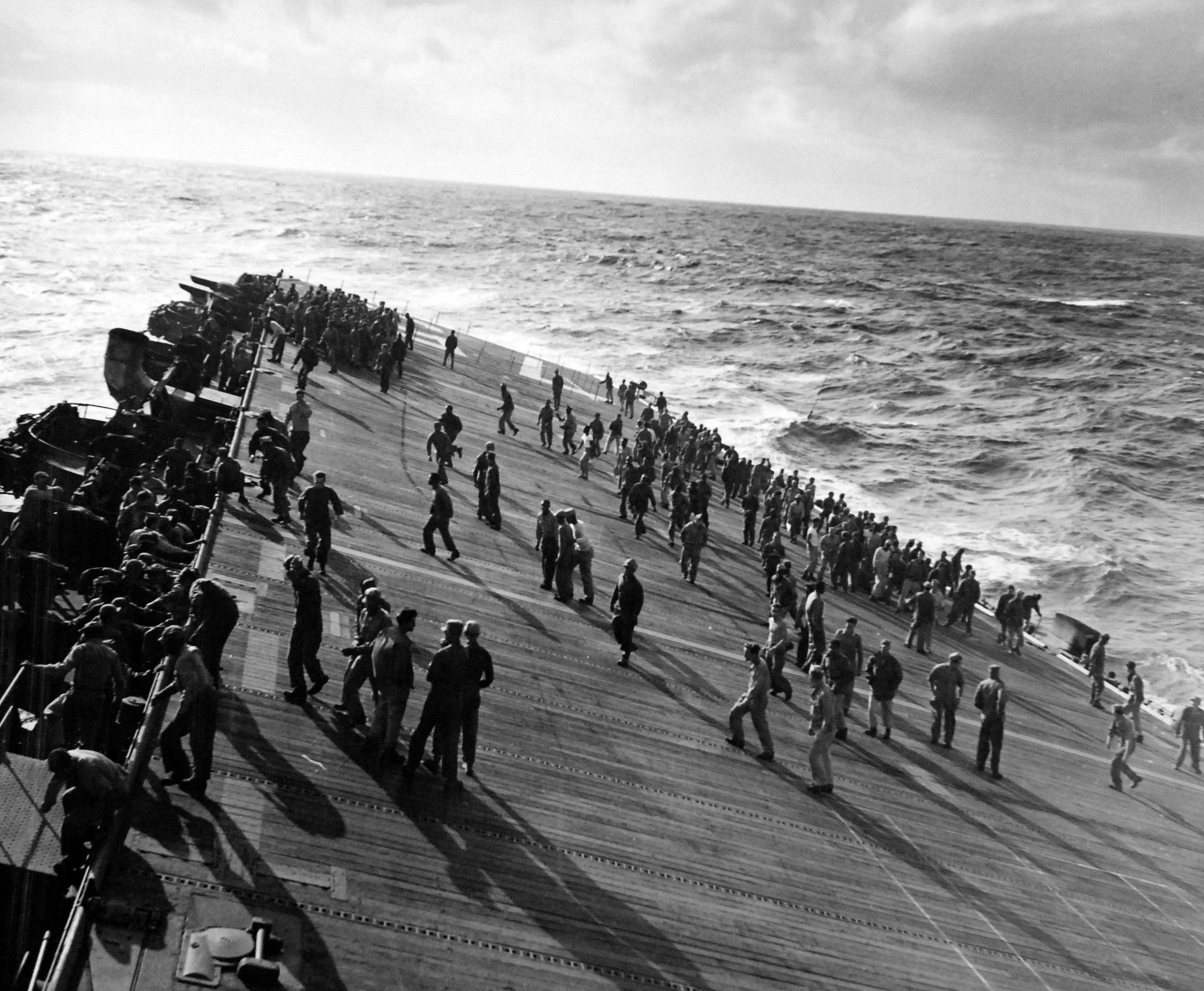
Heavy seas photographed from the island of Hoggatt Bay, 5 December 1945. On the flight deck are "Magic Carpet" passengers being ferried on the return voyage to the West Coast.

Hoggatt Bay arrived at Leyte on 27 June, where she replenished and restocked. After conducting some training exercises off Samar from 17 to 21 July, she left for Adak, Alaska on 11 August to join Vice Admiral Frank Jack Fletcher's Ninth Fleet, which was operating off of the Aleutian Islands. En route, on 15 August, news of the Surrender of Japan reached the ship. She moored at Kuluk Bay from 18 to 30 August, before departing on 31 August for Mutsu Bay, where Fletcher received the formal surrender of Japanese forces in northern Honshu and Hokkaido on 6 September. Arriving on 7 September, Hoggatt Bay conducted air patrols and dropped supplies for American ex-prisoners of war. On 14 September, Captain Frederick Norman Kivette took over command of the vessel.

On 15 September, Lieutenant Colonel James Devereux, who had received a Navy Cross for his conduct during the Battle of Wake Island, was taken onto Hoggatt Bay, where he was expeditiously airlifted back to the United States. On 18 September, she rode out Typhoon Ida, and for the latter half of September, she covered the landings of contingents of the Eighth Army in Aomori. She then proceeded southwards into Tokyo Bay on 28 September, where Rear Admiral Martin departed the ship. She left Tokyo Bay on 29 September, escaping the path of Tropical Storm Kate. She entered Apra Harbor on 4 October, and was at Pearl Harbor by 14 October. She arrived at San Francisco on 21 October, where her aircraft contingent, VC-99, was detached. The following day she put into Richmond, where she was assigned to the Operation Magic Carpet fleet, which repatriated U.S. servicemen from throughout the Pacific. At Richmond, conversion into a troopship went into effect, with 704 bunk beds being installed within her hangar deck.

Hoggatt Bay's first Magic Carpet trip began on 3 November, when she headed westwards, bound for Pearl Harbor. Midway through, her destination changed to Saipan, and she ferried approximately 1200 passengers back to the West Coast, sailing into San Pedro on 7 December. Her second trip started on 13 December, arriving at Buckner Bay on 1 January 1946. Taking on some more passengers at Guam on 13 January, she steamed into San Francisco on 28 January. There, on 30 January, Captain Marvin Pabodie Evenson took over command of the vessel. Whilst moored at San Francisco, she was discharged from the Magic Carpet fleet, and assigned to join the Atlantic Reserve Fleet. She took on five SB2C Helldiver dive bombers and four F4U Corsair fighters, as well as 450 marines at San Francisco, and sailed for San Diego on 11 February. She unloaded her cargo on 12 February, where another load of aircraft was taken on. After transiting the Panama Canal, she unloaded her aircraft at Jacksonville, Florida on 7 March. She then proceeded northwards, stopping at Norfolk, Virginia on 17 March, before entering Boston, Massachusetts on 20 March.

After arriving, Hoggatt Bay was decommissioned and mothballed on 20 July 1946, joining the Boston group of the Atlantic Reserve Fleet, mooring at the South Boston Naval Annex. On 12 June 1955, she was redesignated as a helicopter aircraft carrier, receiving the hull symbol CVHE-75. On 7 May 1959, she was further redesignated as an aviation transport, receiving the hull symbol AKV-25. She was struck from the Navy list on 1 September 1959, and she was sold for scrapping on 31 March 1960. She was ultimately broken up in Bilbao, Spain during May 1960. Hoggatt Bay received five battle stars for her World War II service.

== Sources ==
=== Online sources ===
- "'Hoggatt Bay' (CVE-75)". Dictionary of American Naval Fighting Ships. Naval History and Heritage Command. 27 April 2016. Archived from the original on 21 March 2021. This article incorporates text from this source, which is in the public domain.
- "Kaiser Vancouver, Vancouver WA". www.ShipbuildingHistory.com. 27 November 2010. Archived from the original on 16 June 2019.
- "World Aircraft Carriers List: US Escort Carriers, S4 Hulls". Hazegray.org. 14 December 1998. Archived from the original on 19 November 2021.
- Maksel, Rebecca (14 August 2012). "How Do You Name an Aircraft Carrier?". Air & Space/Smithsonian.

=== Bibliography ===
- Adcock, Al (1996), Escort Carriers in Action - Warships No. 9, Carrollton, Texas: Squadron/Signal Publications, ISBN 9780897473569
- Chesneau, Robert; Gardiner, Robert (1980), Conway's All the World's Fighting Ships 1922–1946, London, England: Naval Institute Press, ISBN 9780870219139
- Friedman, Norman (1983), U.S. Aircraft Carriers: An Illustrated Design History, Annapolis, Maryland: Naval Institute Press, ISBN 9780870217395
- Kennedy, Don H. (1974). Ship Names: Origins and Usages during 45 Centuries. Charlottesville: University Press of Virginia. ISBN 0-8139-0531-1.
- Ross, Al (1993), The Escort Carrier Gambier Bay, Anatomy of the Ship, London, England: Conway Maritime Press, ISBN 9781557502353
- United States Navy (1946), The story of the U.S.S. Hoggatt Bay, Bangor, Maine: World War Regimental Histories
- Y'Blood, William (2012), The Little Giants: U.S. Escort Carriers Against Japan, Annapolis, Maryland: Naval Institute Press, ISBN 9781612512471
