= Hugo Osterhaus =

United States Navy admiral

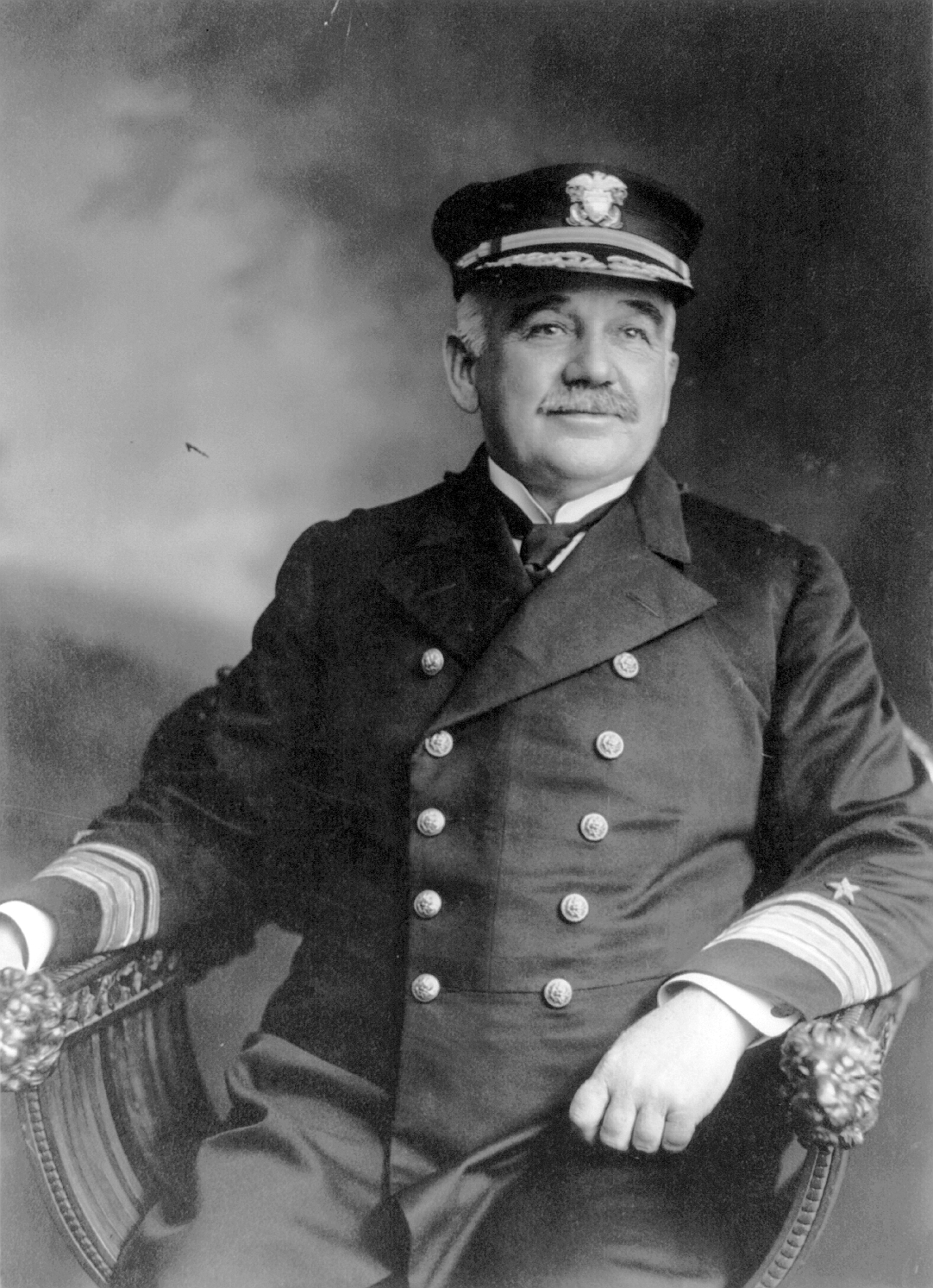
- Hugo Osterhaus in 1913
- Born: June 15, 1851; Belleville, Illinois, US
- Died: June 11, 1927 (aged 75); Castle Point, New York, US
- Burial place: Arlington National Cemetery
- Military career
- Allegiance: United States of America
- Branch: United States Navy
- Service years: 1871–1913, 1917–1920
- Rank: Rear Admiral
- Commands: Connecticut (BB-18); Atlantic Fleet
- Conflicts: World War I
- Awards: Navy Cross

Hugo Osterhaus (15 June 1851 in Belleville, Illinois – 11 June 1927 in Castle Point, New York) was a Rear Admiral in the United States Navy. He was the son of Civil War Major General Peter J. Osterhaus (1823–1917) and father of Navy Admiral Hugo Wilson Osterhaus (1878–1972).

== U.S. Navy career ==
Osterhaus was appointed Midshipman on 22 September 1865 and received his commission as an Ensign on 13 July 1871. He was commissioned Master, 12 February 1874; Lieutenant 13 March 1880; Lieutenant Commander 3 March 1899; Commander 2 July 1901; Captain 19 February 1906; Rear Admiral 4 December 1909 and was placed on the retired list 15 June 1913.

He was captain of the battleship Connecticut (BB-18) as part of the Great White Fleet which was a United States Navy force that completed a circumnavigation of the world from December 16, 1907, to February 22, 1909 by order of U.S. President Theodore Roosevelt. Roosevelt sought to demonstrate growing American military power and blue-water navy capability.

Osterhaus was recalled to active duty during World War I serving from 11 April 1917 until 1 November 1920 when he was relieved of active duty and returned home.

His flag commands included the Second Division, Atlantic Fleet; the Mare Island Navy Yard; the 12th Naval District; and the Atlantic Fleet.

Awarded the Navy Cross

During World War I he received the Navy Cross for services in the Office of Naval Districts.

== Death ==
RADM Hugo Osterhaus died 11 June 1927. He is buried at Arlington National Cemetery with his wife Mary W. (1855–1942).

== Namesake ==
The destroyer USS Osterhaus (DE-164), launched 18 April 1943 and sponsored by Miss Helen Osterhaus, was so named in his honor.

Military offices
Preceded by Seaton Schroeder	Commander-in-Chief of the U.S. Atlantic Fleet; 1911–1913	Succeeded by Charles J. Badger
