= USS Osterhaus =

Cannon-class destroyer escort

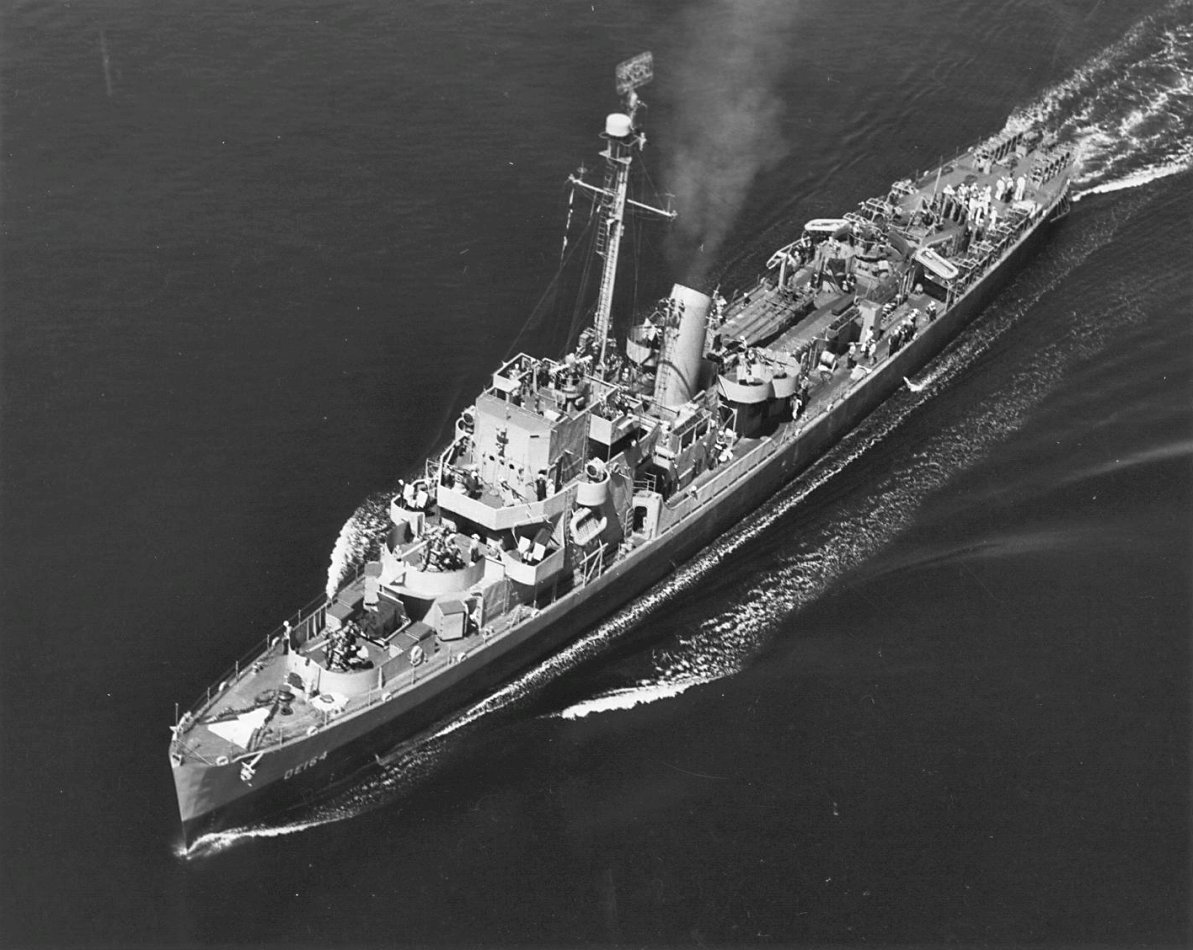

History

United States
- Name: USS Osterhaus
- Namesake: Hugo Osterhaus
- Builder: Federal Shipbuilding and Drydock Company, Newark, New Jersey
- Laid down: 11 November 1942
- Launched: 18 April 1943
- Commissioned: 12 June 1943
- Decommissioned: 26 June 1946
- Stricken: 1 November 1972
- Honors and awards: 3 battle stars (World War II)
- Fate: Sold for scrapping, 30 May 1974

General characteristics
- Class & type: Cannon-class destroyer escort
- Displacement: 1,240 long tons (1,260 t) standard; 1,620 long tons (1,646 t) full
- Length: 306 ft (93 m) o/a; 300 ft (91 m) w/l
- Beam: 36 ft 10 in (11.23 m)
- Draft: 11 ft 8 in (3.56 m)
- Propulsion: 4 × GM Mod. 16-278A diesel engines with electric drive, 6,000 shp (4,474 kW), 2 screws
- Speed: 21 knots (39 km/h; 24 mph)
- Range: 10,800 nmi (20,000 km) at 12 kn (22 km/h; 14 mph)
- Complement: 15 officers and 201 enlisted
- Armament: 3 single × Mk.22 3"/50 caliber guns; 8 × 20 mm Mk.4 AA guns; 3 × 21-inch (533 mm) torpedo tubes; 1 × Hedgehog Mk.10 anti-submarine mortar (144 rounds); 8 × Mk.6 depth charge projectors; 2 × Mk.9 depth charge tracks

USS Osterhaus (DE-164) was a Cannon-class destroyer escort in service with the United States Navy from 1943 to 1946. She was scrapped in 1974.

== History ==
Osterhaus, named in honor of Hugo Osterhaus, winner of the Navy Cross, was laid down on 11 November 1942 by the Federal Shipbuilding and Dry Dock Co., Port Newark, New Jersey; launched on 18 April 1943 sponsored by Miss Helen Osterhaus; and commissioned on 12 June 1943.

=== 1943 ===
After shakedown training out of Port Royal, Great Sound, Bermuda, Osterhaus departed New York on 21 August 1943 for Espiritu Santo, New Hebrides Islands. Departing on 3 October she made repeated escort missions from the New Hebrides and New Caledonia advanced bases to the various fighting fronts of the Solomons.

As Osterhaus patrolled off the beach at Kola Point, Guadalcanal, in the early morning darkness of 11 October, two Japanese planes came in low from the beach for a sneak attack that resulted in damaging torpedo hits on the SS George Bliss and SS John H. Couch. The latter ship burst into flames and was closed by USS Bebas (DE-10) and Osterhaus. For the next two days the two destroyer escorts sent fire and rescue parties on board the merchant ship, finally succeeding in quelling the flames and salvaging ammunition, ordnance equipment and engineering tools.

=== 1944 ===
In the following months, Osterhaus escorted troop and supply ships from advanced bases to Guadalcanal and Bougainville Island in the Solomons with intervals of anti-submarine sector patrols that took her as far from Guadalcanal as the Fiji Islands. After amphibious warfare landing rehearsals in preparation for the invasion assaults on the Marianas Islands, Osterhaus set course from Guadalcanal on 12 June 1944 as a part of the screen for transports carrying garrison troops to Eniwetok in the Marshall Islands. Arriving on 18 June, she passed out to sea the following day for a logistic support area to the east of Saipan where she found no sign of enemy submarine activity as she guarded oilers and other logistic ships replenishing the American invasion fleet.

On 23 July Osterhaus departed Eniwetok in the screen of a troop convoy that landed troops on Guam from the sea on 29 July. The following day the transports entered Agat Bay where Osterhaus witnessed concentrated dive and level bombing by American aircraft on Orote Peninsula and the effective heavy shelling by U. S. warships. On the evening of 30 July she sailed with her Escort Division Eleven to safeguard a task unit of transports returning to Eniwetok.

Osterhaus departed Eniwetok on 20 August to base her operations from Seeadler Harbor, Manus, Admiralty Islands. The flagship of Escort Division Eleven, she departed Manus on 6 September to help guard three escort carriers and a number of fleet oilers to ocean rendezvous with the Fast Carrier Task Forces. The logistic area was reached on 11 September and the escort carriers transferred replacement aircraft and aircraft parts to the heavy attack aircraft carriers while fleet oilers and other logistic ships replenished the Fast Carrier Striking Force preparing for the liberation of the Western Caroline and Philippine Islands.

The duty of protecting logistic ships operating from Seeadler Harbor in support of the Philippine Campaign continued until 20 November when Osterhaus left that port astern for the Hawaiian Islands and the west coast of the United States. She arrived in San Francisco Bay on 13 December for overhaul in the Terminal Island Shipyard, San Pedro, Los Angeles.

=== 1945 ===
Osterhaus returned to Pearl Harbor on 23 April 1945 and assisted in guarding a convoy of transports and merchant ships bound by way of the Marshall Islands to Ulithi, Caroline Islands. She reached Ulithi with the transports on 9 June and spent the remainder of the war in escort duty between that island, the Marianas, and the Marshalls. She departed Kwajalein Lagoon on 16 September bound with Escort Division Eleven for Pearl Harbor, San Diego, the Panama Canal, and New York City where she received Navy Day visitors on 27 October.

=== 1946-1974 ===
Osterhaus arrived in Jacksonville, Florida, on 29 November, shifting the following day to Green Cove Springs Anchorage for inactivation. She was decommissioned there on 26 June 1946 and remained in reserve status until she was sold on 30 May 1974 and scrapped.

== Awards ==
Osterhaus received three battle stars for service in World War II.
