= USS Steele =

Evarts-class destroyer escort

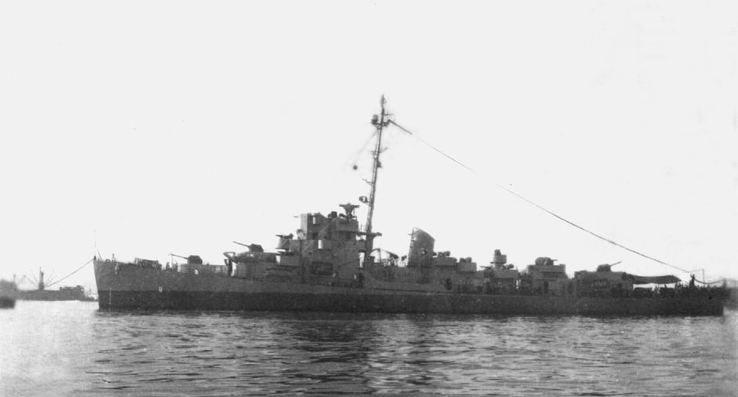
- Steele at anchor, c. 1945

History

United States
- Builder: Boston Navy Yard
- Laid down: 27 January 1942
- Launched: 9 January 1943
- Commissioned: 4 May 1943
- Decommissioned: 21 November 1945
- Stricken: 5 December 1945

General characteristics
- Displacement: 1,140 tons
- Length: 289 ft 5 in (88.21 m)
- Beam: 35 ft 2 in (10.72 m)
- Speed: 19½ kts
- Complement: 198
- Armament: 3 3 in (76 mm), 4 1.1"/75 caliber gun, 2 40 mm., 9 20 mm., 3 dct., 8 dcp., 1 dcp. (hh.)

USS Steele (BDE-8/DE-8) was an Evarts-class short-hull destroyer escort in the service of the United States Navy.

== Design ==
The Evarts-class destroyer escorts were 289 ft 5 in (88.21 m) long overall, and they had a beam of 35 ft 2 in (10.72 m). They had an average draft of 10 ft 1 in (3.07 m) at their full load displacement of 1,416 long tons (1,439 t). Each ship had a normal crew numbered 156 officers and sailors.

Steele was propelled by a pair of diesel motors manufactured by General Motors, which drove a pair of screw propellers. Her propulsion system was rated to produce 6,000 brake horsepower (4,500 kW) for a top speed of 19.5 knots (36.1 km/h; 22.4 mph). Oil storage amounted to between 131 and 197 long tons (133 and 200 t), which allowed a cruising radius of up to 6,000 nautical miles (11,000 km; 6,900 mi) at an economical pace of 10 knots (19 km/h; 12 mph).

The ship's armament consisted of a main battery of three 3-inch (76 mm) /50-caliber guns in individual pivot mounts, which could be used against air or surface targets. These were supported by a light anti-aircraft battery that initially consisted of four 1.1 in (28 mm) /75-caliber guns in a quadruple mount and nine 20 mm (0.79 in) Oerlikon guns. For attacks against submarines, the ship was equipped with a Hedgehog mortar, eight depth charge throwers, and two depth charge racks.

== Service history ==
John Steele, the namesake of the new ship, was a marine killed during the Battle of the Coral Sea aboard the aircraft carrier USS Lexington. Steele was laid down on 27 January 1942 by the Boston Navy Yard. She was launched on 9 January 1943 and sponsored by Steel's widow, and was commissioned on 4 May 1943.

Steele sailed from Boston for Bermuda to begin her shakedown cruise on 25 May and returned on 27 June for post-shakedown availability. She stood out of port on 6 July en route to the Pacific war zone. After making port calls at the Society and Tonga islands, Steele arrived at Nouméa, New Caledonia, on 10 August. She escorted merchant ships and transports among the New Hebrides, Fiji, and Solomon Islands until 13 December 1943 when she got underway for the west coast of the United States to be repaired.

Steele arrived at Mare Island, California, on 3 January 1944 and headed for Hawaii exactly one month later. She arrived at Pearl Harbor on 9 February and sailed with a convoy to the Marshall Islands on the 14th. They reached Majuro on the 22nd. The DE performed escort and patrol duty in the Marshalls until 7 May, when she sailed for the Gilbert Islands to serve in the destroyer screen at Tarawa. These orders were countermanded the day after her arrival, and she returned to Majuro on 12 May. Two days later, the escort put to sea with two tankers for a fueling rendezvous with aircraft carriers of Task Force (TF) 58, which was conducting air strikes against Marcus Island and Wake Island.

Upon completion of this assignment, the ship was routed to Kwajalein for tender availability. Steele sailed on 5 June for Kusaie Island in the eastern Caroline Islands to observe enemy activity and possibly to intercept a Japanese submarine believed to be due there on the 6th. The submarine did not arrive, so the destroyer bombarded Lele Harbor on the east coast of the island and ascertained that the island was lightly fortified. She returned to the Marshalls and operated there until 23 June.

Steele escorted Chandeleur to the Mariana Islands and arrived off Saipan the morning of 26 June. She was assigned to the antisubmarine screen and then joined a convoy for the return trip to the Marshall Islands. She made another escort voyage to the Mariana Islands in early August. After a short upkeep period, Steele was assigned to a hunter-killer group centered on Hoggatt Bay. The group sortied on 21 August and was designated as one of the eight groups of Admiral William Halsey's Western Carolines Forces which supported the fast carriers of TF 38.

Steele, with her group, supported the amphibious assault on Peleliu, Palau Islands, by patrolling between there and Mindanao, Philippine Islands. After refueling on 23 September, the group shifted their patrol area to the northeast of the Palaus. On 3 October, Samuel S. Miles made a surface contact which was identified as a Japanese submarine. Steele was detached from the screen to assist the escort. The submarine had submerged, but Samuel S. Miles made sonar contact and fired two Hedgehog patterns. The second pattern produced two underwater explosions which Steele's sonar equipment picked up and a third explosion so violent that it damaged some of Miles' sonar and radar. Steele made more runs over the area but could not make contact. Miles had sunk the Japanese submarine I-364.

Steele made a logistics stop at Manus from 9 to 13 October and sallied with the group for the Philippine Islands. As the fast carriers launched strikes against Leyte, Luzon, and Formosa, the aircraft from Hoggatt Bay protected the refueling operations. On the 20th, Steele and her group rendezvoused with Houston and Canberra, which had been hit off Formosa while serving with the 3rd Fleet. After furnishing protection for the cruisers for two days, the group was detached to rejoin the 3rd Fleet fueling group which was then supporting the liberation of Leyte. The group arrived at Ulithi on 27 October and was dissolved the following day. On 1 November, Steele returned to the Palaus and operated from there until 8 January 1945, when she arrived at Ulithi for upkeep. After escorting a convoy to Saipan, the escort headed for Pearl Harbor.

Steele was there for a month and then escorted ships to Eniwetok, Saipan, Ulithi, and Guam. She arrived at Apra Harbor on 5 May and operated from there until 18 September, when she sailed for the west coast. The destroyer escort arrived at San Pedro, Los Angeles, on 5 October. An inspection team checked the ship on the 23rd and recommended that she be scrapped.

Steele decommissioned on 21 November and was struck from the Navy list on 5 December 1945.

== Awards ==
- Combat Action Ribbon (retroactive)
- American Campaign Medal
- Asiatic–Pacific Campaign Medal (with two service stars)
- World War II Victory Medal
