= USS Bebas =

Evarts-class destroyer escort

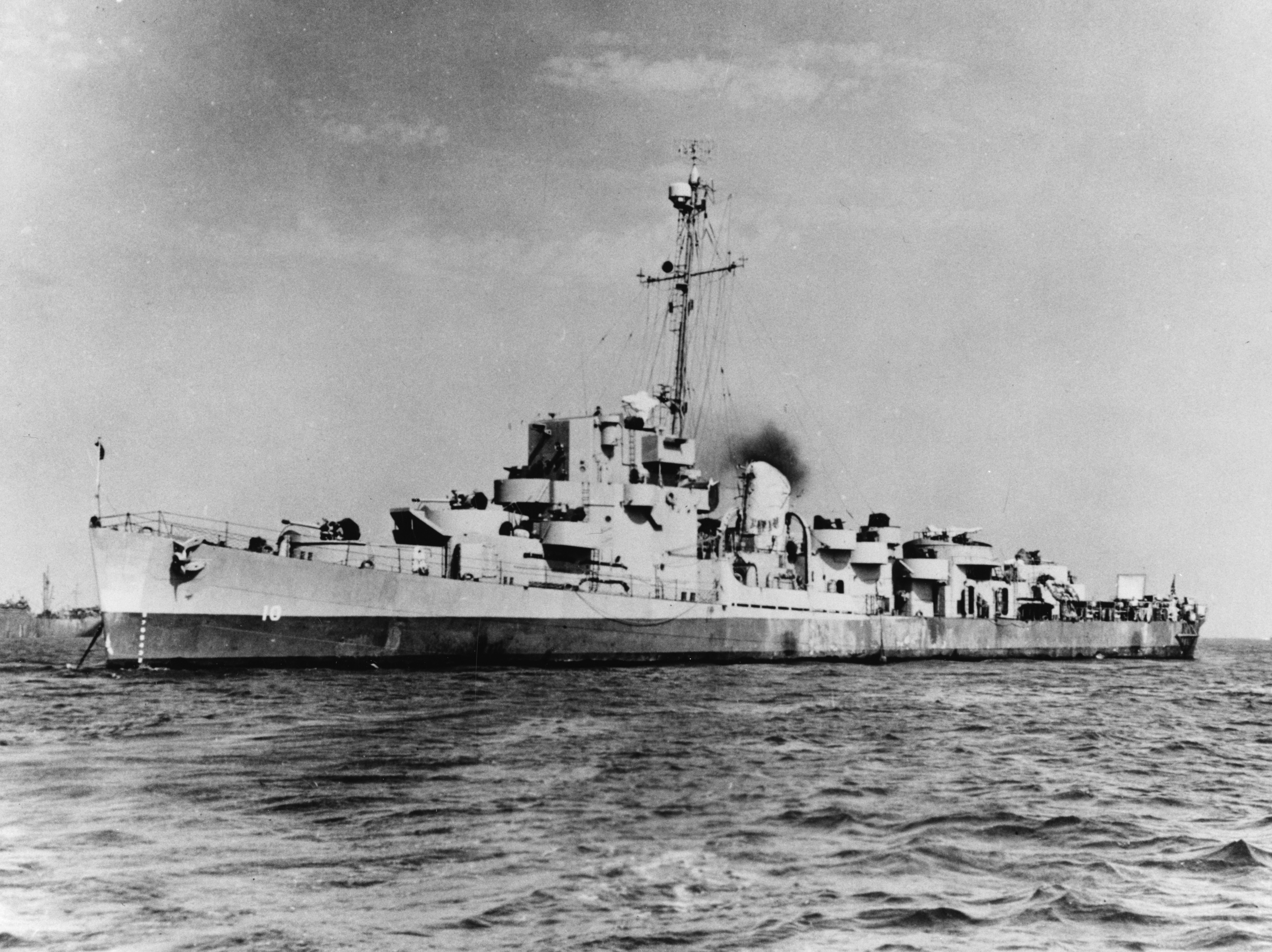
- Bebas c. 1945

History

United States
- Builder: Boston Navy Yard
- Laid down: 27 November 1942
- Launched: 9 January 1943
- Commissioned: 15 May 1943
- Decommissioned: 18 October 1945
- Stricken: 1 November 1945
- Fate: Sold for scrapping January 1947

General characteristics
- Displacement: 1,140 tons
- Length: 289 ft 5 in
- Beam: 35 ft 2 in
- Speed: 19½ knots
- Complement: 198
- Armament: 3 3 in (76 mm), 4 1.1"/75 caliber gun, 2 40 mm., 9 20 mm., 3 dct., 8 dcp., 1 dcp. (hh.)

USS Bebas (DE-10) was an Evarts-class destroyer escort in the service of the United States Navy from 1943 to 1945.

== Design ==
The Evarts-class destroyer escorts were 289 ft 5 in (88.21 m) long overall, and they had a beam of 35 ft 2 in (10.72 m). They had an average draft of 10 ft 1 in (3.07 m) at their full load displacement of 1,416 long tons (1,439 t). Each ship had a normal crew numbered 156 officers and sailors.

Bebas was propelled by a pair of diesel motors manufactured by General Motors, which drove a pair of screw propellers. Her propulsion system was rated to produce 6,000 brake horsepower (4,500 kW) for a top speed of 19.5 knots (36.1 km/h; 22.4 mph). Oil storage amounted to between 131 and 197 long tons (133 and 200 t), which allowed a cruising radius of up to 6,000 nautical miles (11,000 km; 6,900 mi) at an economical pace of 10 knots (19 km/h; 12 mph).

The ship's armament consisted of a main battery of three 3-inch (76 mm) /50-caliber guns in individual pivot mounts, which could be used against air or surface targets. These were supported by a light anti-aircraft battery that initially consisted of four 1.1 in (28 mm) /75-caliber guns in a quadruple mount and nine 20 mm (0.79 in) Oerlikon guns. For attacks against submarines, the ship was equipped with a Hedgehog mortar, eight depth charge throwers, and two depth charge racks.

== History ==
Originally allocated to the Royal Navy under lend lease, BDE-10 was laid down on 27 November 1942 at the Boston Navy Yard. The ships was launched on 9 January 1943 and reallocated to the United States Navy on 25 January 1943. The ship was then renamed Bebas after Gus Bebas, a naval aviator killed during training exercises in July 1942. The ship was sponsored by Angeline Bebas, the mother of the namesake, in a special christening ceremony just before commissioning, she was commissioned at Boston, Massachusetts on 15 May 1943.

=== Operational history ===
After arriving off Bermuda on 17 June for shakedown, the destroyer escort steamed back to the New York Navy Yard for repairs between 24 and 29 June. After returning to Bermudan waters to resume her interrupted shakedown training, Bebas completed that evolution during July and then spent the next few weeks in coastal escort and patrol operations out of Casco Bay in Maine, Boston, New York, and Norfolk, Virginia.

Upon departing Hampton Roads on 24 August in company with three of her sister ships, Bebas sailed for the Pacific. After transiting the Panama Canal on 1 September, she proceeded via the Galapagos and Society Islands to Espiritu Santo in the New Hebrides. The warship operated out of that port during October and November, conducting patrol and escort missions to Nouméa, New Caledonia, and to Guadalcanal in the Solomons. Highlighting this service was her attempt to salvage the Liberty ship John H. Couch that had been set ablaze by a Japanese aerial torpedo during a raid on the night of 11 October.

Bebas, patrolling an antisubmarine sector off Lunga and Koli Points, Guadalcanal, went to general quarters at 0149 to investigate a "fire explosion at sea." The destroyer escort then determined the fire to be on board a beached ship, and reduced speed to draw closer. Going alongside at 0600, Bebas sent over her fire and rescue party to fight gasoline fires raging in John H. Couch's holds two and three, but the flames had gained the upper hand. After recovering her men, the warship backed away and shelled the merchantman's number two hold, in an attempt to stop the fire or to sink the ship.

Bebas was subsequently assigned "killer operations and local escort" duty under the auspices of the Commanding General, Fiji Island garrison, and carried out those tasks through January 1944. She then resumed convoy escort and patrol work in the Solomons, New Hebrides, and New Caledonia areas. In April 1944, the destroyer escort returned to the United States for an overhaul at Hunters Point.

Clearing the west coast on 30 May, Bebas proceeded via Pearl Harbor to the Marshall Islands and reached Eniwetok on 27 June for convoy escort duty between Pearl Harbor and the Marshalls through the end of July. She then joined a "hunter-killer" task group formed around the escort carrier USS Hoggatt Bay (CVE-75) and provided support for the occupation of the Western Carolines and for the invasion of the Philippines at Leyte.

Next, after performing screening and escort duties out of the Palaus and Ulithi late in October, Bebas underwent repairs at Espiritu Santo and then escorted shipping between the Palaus, Ulithi, and Eniwetok during the first three months of 1945.

On 2 February 1945, Bebas cleared Eniwetok in company with the tankers USS Cossatot (AO-77) and SS Egg Harbor, bound for Ulithi. On the second night out, Bebas and her two charges identified another convoy as friendly and then picked up a surface radar contact which a quick exchange of information showed to be "definitely suspicious." Radar plot indicated that the contact was crossing the track of both convoys.

Bebas obtained permission from the convoy commodore to pursue the target and went to general quarters. The quarry disappeared, but was picked up on sonar—a definite submarine. Reducing speed to carry out a deliberate attack, Bebas stalked the submarine. Soon after her first "hedgehog" attack failed, she followed up with a second and heard one sharp and two muffled detonations soon thereafter. A third "hedgehog" pattern yielded negative results.

An hour later, wood fragments, varying in length from two to ten feet, found on the water near the attack location prompted Bebas to carry out a box search through the night; and, the following morning, four other destroyer escorts and an Eniwetok-based PBM Martin Mariner patrol bomber joined the search. Between 0800 and 1525, they searched over 600 square miles (1,600 km^{2}) of ocean. Late in the search, the PBM sent them to a concentrated oil slick about four miles (6 km) from the site of the "hedgehog" attack on the previous night. Bebas took samples of the slick—heavy sludge or a mixture of lubricating oil and fuel oil—as well as a piece of wood. That afternoon, the four destroyer escorts parted company with Bebas, but USS Bond (AM-152) joined her to continue the hunt. Further investigations yielded no additional evidence, and the search was terminated at noon on 6 February. Postwar accounting indicated no Japanese submarine losses that day, so the identity of Bebas' target remains a mystery.

Bebas then participated in the invasion of Okinawa, escorting transports and patrolling in the antisubmarine screen off the beachhead. While so engaged on 12 May, she rescued Lt. Robert R. Klingman, USMC, of VMF-312, after his F4U Corsair had suffered hydraulic system failure. Later that same morning, while Bebas witnessed the kamikaze attack on USS New Mexico (BB-40), one of her 20 mm guns scored hits on the "Oscar" before it crashed into the nearby battleship. The destroyer escort then screened refueling groups supporting carrier strikes on the Japanese homeland in July before proceeding to Hawaii for repairs and alterations.

She entered Pearl Harbor on 3 August and was still there on 15 August when Japan agreed to capitulate, ending the war. On 4 September, Bebas departed Oahu for the west coast of the United States. Reaching San Francisco, California on 9 September, Bebas shifted to San Pedro and was decommissioned there on 18 October 1945. Her name was struck from the Navy list on 1 November 1945, and she was sold to the Pacific Bridge Co., San Francisco, in January 1947 for scrapping.

Bebas (DE-10) was awarded three battle stars for her World War II service.

== Awards ==
- Combat Action Ribbon (retroactive)
- American Campaign Medal
- Philippine Liberation Medal (with one service stars)
- Asiatic-Pacific Campaign Medal (with five service stars)
- World War II Victory Medal
