= Military history of the Netherlands =

Overview of Dutch military history

The Netherlands, as a nation state, dates to 1568, when the Dutch Revolt created the Dutch Empire. Previously, the Germanic tribes had no written language during the ancient and early medieval periods, so what we know about their early military history comes from accounts written in Latin and from archaeology. This causes significant gaps in the historic timeline. Germanic wars against the Romans are fairly well documented from the Roman perspective; however, Germanic wars against the early Celts remain mysterious because neither side recorded the events. Wars between the Germanic tribes in Northern Belgium and the present day Netherlands, and various Celtic tribes that bordered their lands, are likely due to their geographical proximity.

Belgium, a country with a Dutch-speaking majority, became an independent state in 1830 when it seceded from the Netherlands. Despite the contemporary political boundaries, they share much of the same military history.

== Ancient times ==
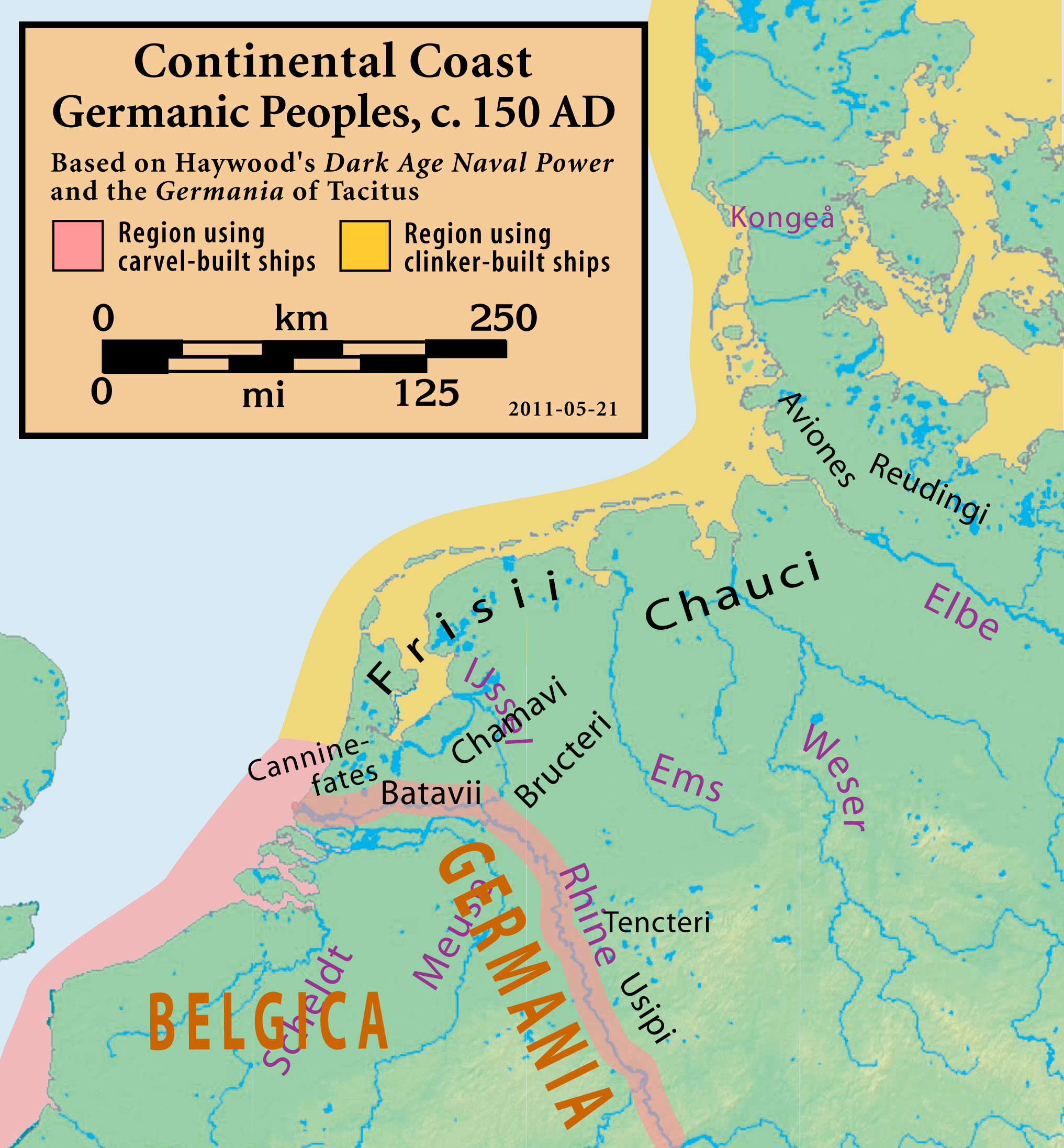
Map of modern coastline of the Netherlands, Germany, and Denmark, showing the Germanic peoples that lived there c. 150 AD.

Germanic tribes are thought to have originated during the Nordic Bronze Age in northern Germany and southern Scandinavia. The tribes spread south, possibly motivated by the deteriorating climate of that area. They crossed the River Elbe, most likely overrunning territories formerly occupied by Celtic people. In the East, other tribes, such as Goths, Rugians and Vandals, settled along the shores of the Baltic Sea pushing southward and eventually settling as far away as Ukraine. The Angles and Saxons migrated to England. The Germanic peoples often had unsettled relationships with their neighbours and each other, leading to a period of over two millennia of military conflict over various territorial, religious, ideological and economic issues.

- Germanic tribes often fought both against and for the Roman Empire.
- On Christmas Day 406, with the freezing of the Rhine, Franks, Allemanni, Burgundians, Suebi and Vandals crossed the Rhine from present day Germany into Gaul. The Franks later expelled the Goths from Aquitaine and absorbed the Burgundians. They were later to give their name to modern France.
- In 455, under the leadership of their King Gaiseric, the Vandals seized Rome, plundering it for 15 days (and henceforth giving their name to wanton destruction).
- From 772 to 814, the Frankish King Charlemagne held the Carolingian Empire, an empire which contained nearly all of the following modern day countries: the Netherlands, Belgium, Luxembourg, France (except Brittany), Germany, Austria, Switzerland, Italy north from below Rome, Slovenia, Liechtenstein, Andorra, Monaco and parts of Spain (northeast), Czech Republic (west), Hungary (west) and Croatia (northwest).

=== The Batavi ===
The Batavi (Batavians) were a Germanic tribe, originally part of the Chatti, reported by Tacitus to have lived around the Rhine delta, in the area which is currently the Netherlands, "an uninhabited district on the extremity of the coast of Gaul, and also of a neighbouring island, surrounded by the ocean in front, and by the river Rhine in the rear and on either side" (Tacitus, Histories iv). This led to the Latin name of Batavia for the area. The same name is used for several military units, originally raised among the Batavi.

They were mentioned by Julius Caesar in his commentary Gallic Wars as living on an island formed by the Meuse River after it is joined by the Waal, 80 Roman miles from the mouth of the river. He said there were many other islands formed by branches of the Rhine, inhabited by a "savage, barbarous nation", some of whom were supposed to live on fish and the eggs of sea-fowl.

Tacitus named the Mattiaci as a similar tribe under homage, but on the other side of the Rhine. The areas inhabited by the Batavians were never occupied by the Romans, as the Batavians were allies.

The Batavians incorrectly became regarded as the sole and eponymous ancestors of the Dutch people. The Netherlands were briefly known as the Batavian Republic. Moreover, during the time Indonesia was a Dutch colony (the Dutch East Indies), the capital (now Jakarta) was named Batavia. If the ancestry of most native Dutch people were traced back to Germanic tribes, most would lead to the Franks, Frisians and Saxons. Dutch is in fact a Low Frankish language, and is the only language (together with Afrikaans, which descends from Dutch itself) to be a direct descendant of Old Frankish, the language of the Franks.

=== Military units of the Batavi ===
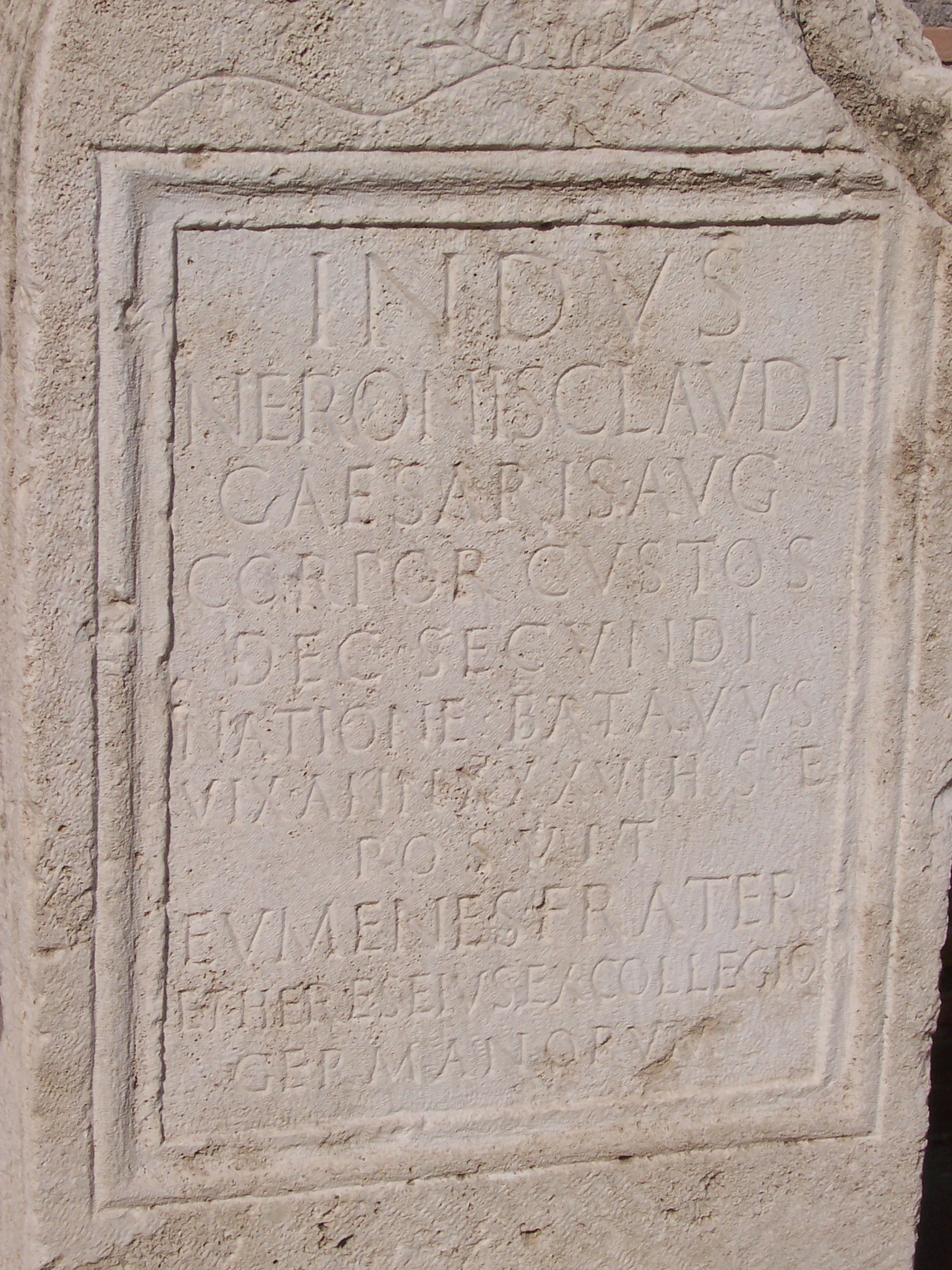
Funerary stela of one of Nero's Corporis Custodes (imperial bodyguard). The bodyguard, Indus, was of the Batavian tribe.

Later, Tacitus described the Batavians as the bravest of the tribes of the area, hardened in the Germanic border wars, with cohorts under their own noble commanders transferred to Britannia. He said they retained the honour of the ancient association with the Romans, not required to pay tribute or taxes and used by the Romans only for war: "They furnished to the Empire nothing but men and arms", Tacitus remarked. They were well regarded for their skills in horsemanship and swimming, for their men and horses could cross the Rhine without losing formation, according to Tacitus. Dio Cassius describes this surprise tactic employed by Aulus Plautius against the "barbarians" — the British Celts — at the battle of the River Medway, 43:

The barbarians thought that Romans would not be able to cross it without a bridge, and consequently bivouacked in rather careless fashion on the opposite bank; but he sent across a detachment of Batavians, who were accustomed to swim easily in full armour across the most turbulent streams. [...] Thence the Britons retired to the river Thames at a point near where it empties into the ocean and at flood-tide forms a lake. This they easily crossed because they knew where the firm ground and the easy passages in this region were to be found; but the Romans in attempting to follow them were not so successful. However, the Batavians swam across again and some others got over by a bridge a little way up-stream, after which they assailed the barbarians from several sides at once and cut down many of them. (Cassius Dio, Roman History, Book 60:20)

The Batavians also provided a contingent for the Emperor's Imperial Horse Guard.

=== The Batavian legacy ===
Numerous altars and tombstones of the Batavi, dating to the 2nd century and 3rd century, have been found along Hadrian's Wall (notably at Castlecary and Carrawburgh), and in Germany, Yugoslavia, Hungary, Romania and Austria. After the 3rd century, however, the Batavians are no longer mentioned, and they are assumed to have merged with the neighbouring Frisian and Frankish people.

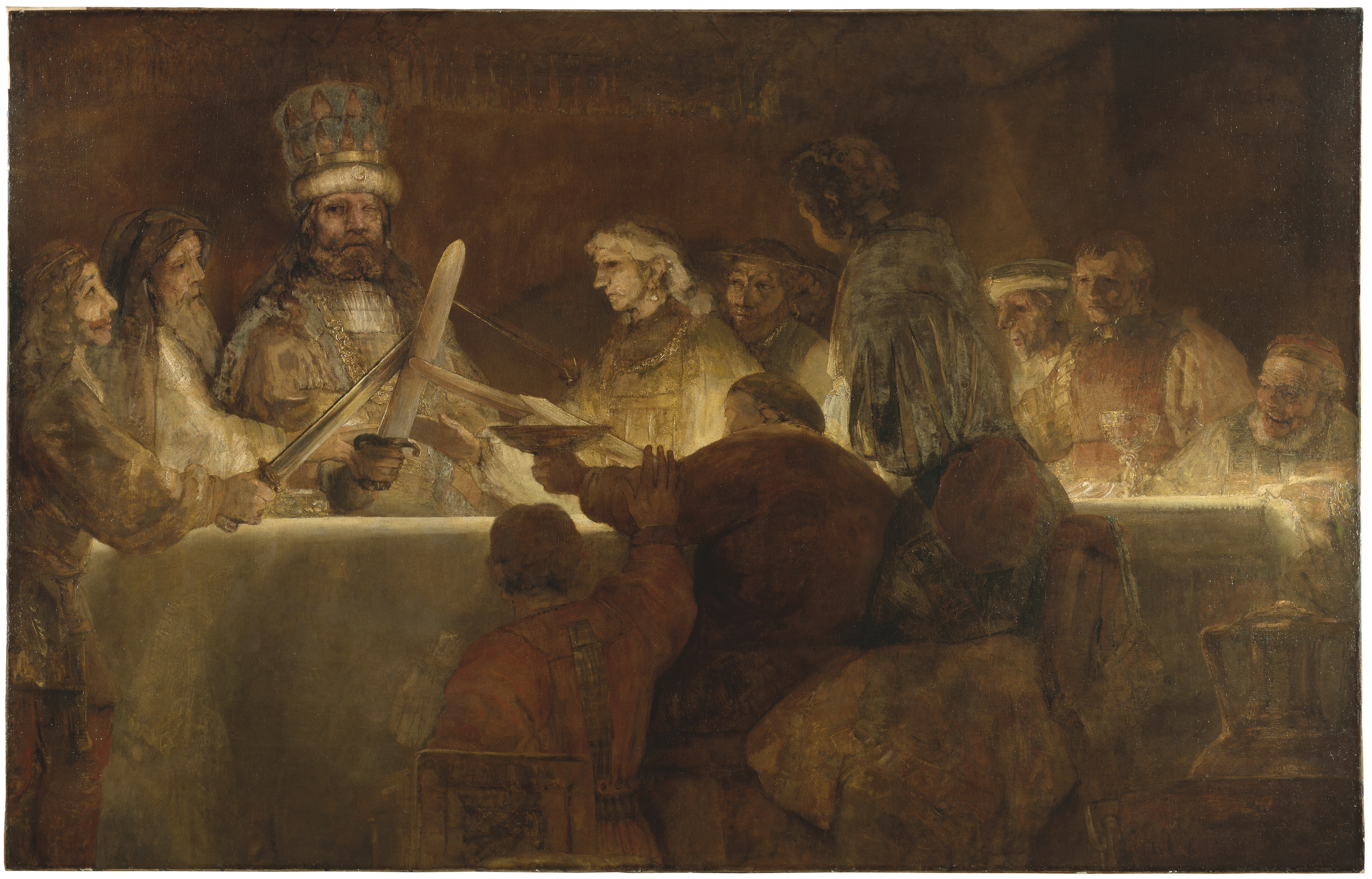
The Conspiracy of Claudius Civilis depicts a scene from Histories where Gaius Julius Civilis persuades Celtic chiefs to join the Batavi revolt.

=== The Romans ===
Until the Franks defeated and pushed them back the Romans established two provinces in the area of the present-day Belgium and a part of the Netherlands. Both were outposts, especially above the Meuse and apart from a few Roman legions sent there to protect the Empires borders, the Roman presence was limited. The provinces were called Gallia Belgica named after the Belgae, a group of Celtic tribes conquered by the Romans, and Germania Inferior (inferior meaning 'low' in Latin, and Germania referring to the area occupied by the Germanic tribes).

During the Revolt of the Batavi, which took place in the Roman province of Germania Inferior between 69 and 70 AD, the rebels led by Civilis managed to destroy four legions and inflict humiliating defeats on the Roman army. After their initial successes, a massive Roman army led by Quintus Petillius Cerialis eventually defeated them. Following peace talks, the situation was normalized, but Batavia had to cope with humiliating conditions and a legion stationed permanently within her lands.

== The Franks ==
The Franks or the Frankish people were one of several west Germanic federations. The confederation was formed out of Germanic tribes: Salians, Sugambri, Chamavi, Tencteri, Chattuarii, Bructeri, Usipetes, Ampsivarii, Chatti. They entered the late Roman Empire from the present day Netherlands and northern Germany and conquered northern Gaul where they were accepted as a foederati and established a lasting realm (sometimes referred to as Francia) in an area that covers most of modern-day France and the western regions of Germany (Franconia, Rhineland, Hesse) and the whole of the Low Countries, forming the historic kernel of the two modern countries. The conversion to Christianity of the pagan Frankish king Clovis was a crucial event in the history of Europe. Like the French and Germans, the Dutch also claim the military history of the Franks as their own.

Battle of Soissons (486)

- The Franks under Clovis I defeat the last Roman army in Gaul.

Battle of Tolbiac (496)

- The Franks under Clovis I defeat the Alamanni tribe.

Battle of Vouillé (507)

- The Franks under Clovis I defeat the Visigoths under Alaric II, the conqueror of Spain. (As a result of these victories, the domains of Clovis quadruple)

Battle of Tours (732)

- One of the most celebrated victories in Western history, the Franks under Charles 'the Hammer' Martel defeated a large Islamic invading force. Historians have debated whether it had the enormous significance that is often claimed, but it was nonetheless a huge symbolic victory .

Battle of Pavia (773)

- The Franks under Charlemagne defeat the Lombards, led by the Frankish king Desiderius, in Italy.

Saxon Campaigns (773-804)

- The Franks under Charlemagne repeatedly subdue over three decades of Saxon insurrections.

Siege of Paris (885-886)

- With 200 men defending Paris, the Western Franks manage to halt and, when outside help arrived, defeat a Viking invasion force of 30,000.

=== The Frankish Empire (481–843) ===
The Frankish Empire was the territory of the Franks, from the 5th to the 10th centuries, from 481 ruled by Clovis I of the Merovingian dynasty, the first king of all the Franks. From 751, under the Carolingian dynasty, it is known as the Carolingian Empire. After the Treaty of Verdun of 843 it was split into East, West and Middle Francia. East Francia gave rise to the Holy Roman Empire with Otto I the Great in 962.

Since the term "Empire" properly applies only to times after the coronation of Charlemagne in 800, and since the unified kingdom was repeatedly split and re-united, most historians prefer to use the term Frankish Kingdoms or Frankish Realm to refer to the entirety of Frankish rule from the 5th to the 9th century.

=== The Holy Roman Empire (843–1648) ===
The Frankish realm underwent many partitions and repartitions, since the Franks divided their property among surviving sons, and lacking a broad sense of a res publica, they conceived of the realm as a large extent of private property. This practice explains in part the difficulty of describing precisely the dates and physical boundaries of any of the Frankish kingdoms and who ruled the various sections. The contraction of literacy while the Franks ruled compounds the problem: they produced few written records. In essence, however, two dynasties of leaders succeeded each other; first the Merovingians and then the Carolingians.

The Holy Roman Empire was a political conglomeration of lands in Central Europe and Western Europe in the Middle Ages and the early modern period. Emerging from the eastern part of the Frankish Empire after its division in the Treaty of Verdun (843), it lasted almost a millennium until its dissolution in 1806. By the 18th century, it still consisted of the larger part of modern Germany, Bohemia (now Czech Republic), Austria, Liechtenstein, Slovenia, Belgium, and Luxembourg, as well as large parts of modern Poland and small parts of the Netherlands and Croatia. Previously, it had included all of the Netherlands and Switzerland, parts of modern France and Italy. By the middle of the 18th century, the empire had been greatly reduced in power.

== Eighty Years' War (1568–1648) ==
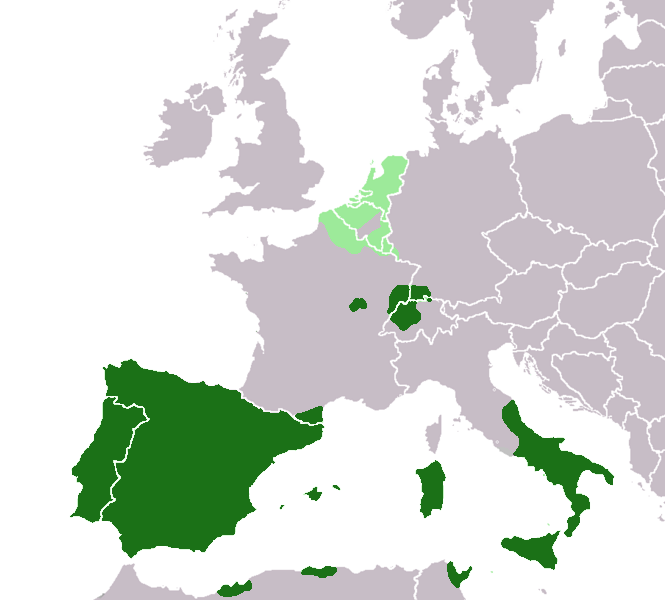
The Spanish Empire in 1580, with the Spanish Netherlands in light green. The northern half of the Spanish Netherlands, the United Provinces, achieved de facto independence from Spain in 1581, during the Eighty Years' War.

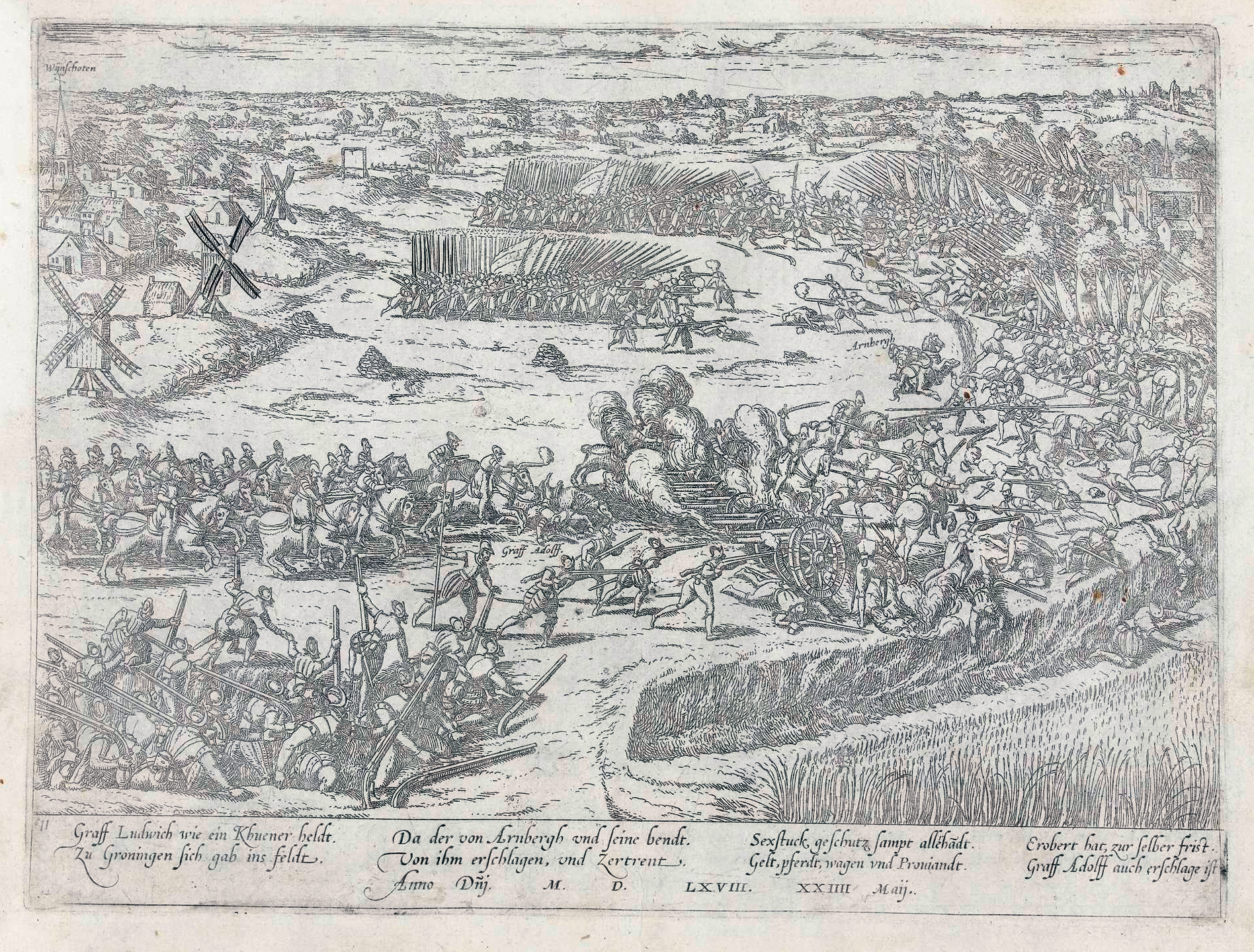
Depiction of the Battle of Heiligerlee, 1568. The battle was the first victory for the Dutch rebels in the Eighty Years' War.

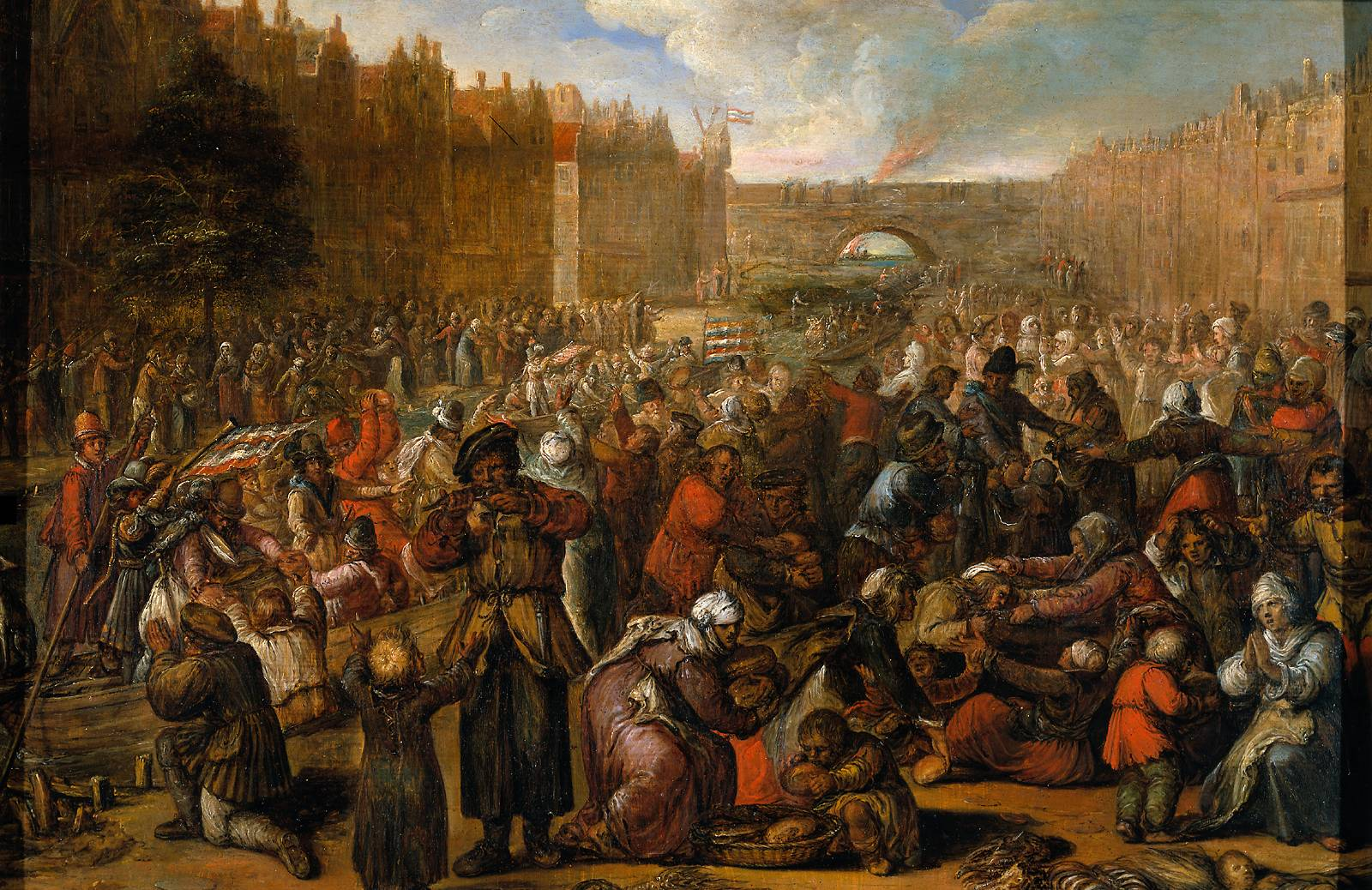
The relief of Leiden shortly after the city was besieged by Spanish forces, 1574. The siege ended when the geuzen opened the dikes surrounding the city causing the Spanish troops to flee.

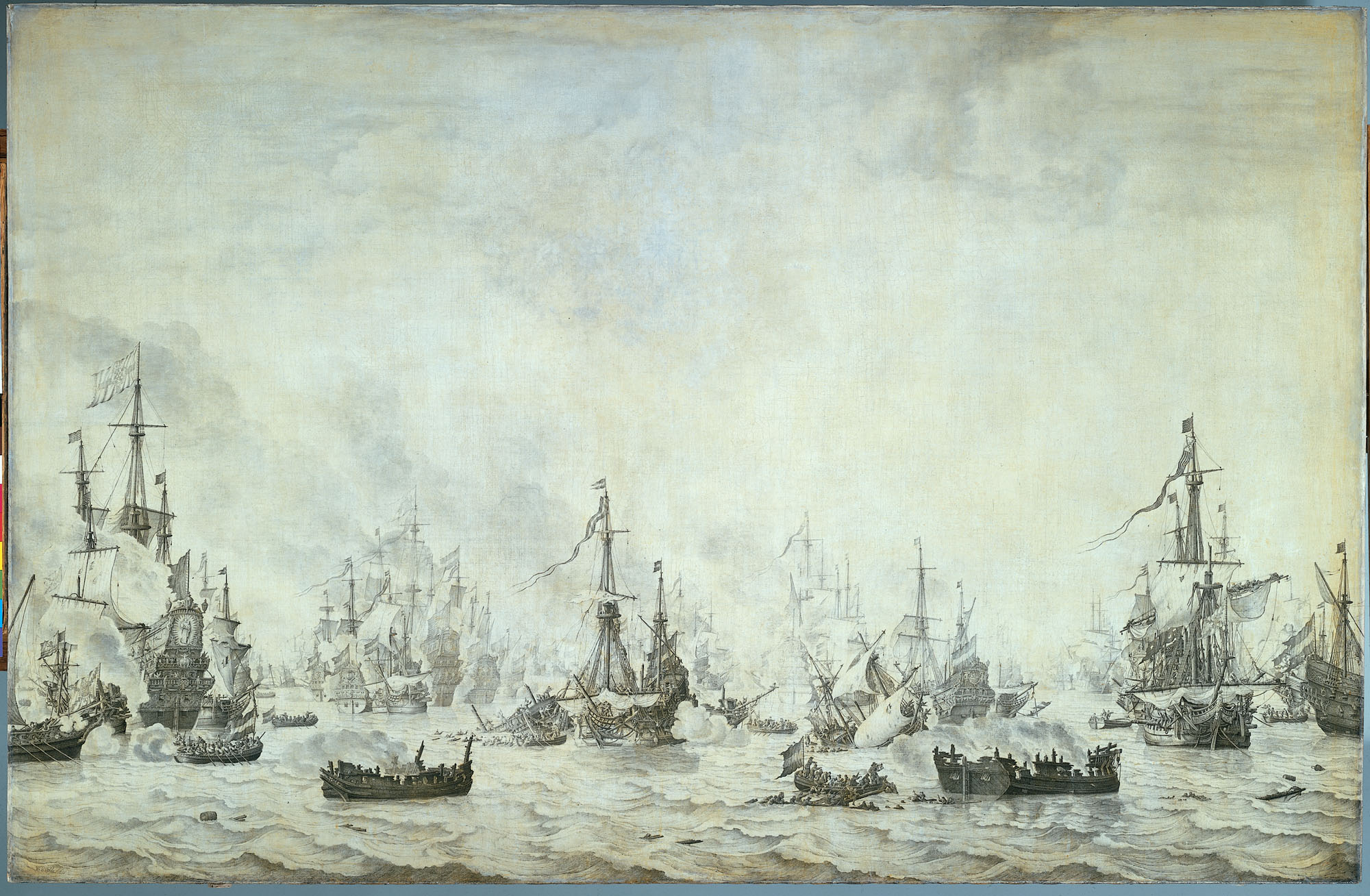
The Battle of the Downs in 1639, was a decisive naval victory for the Dutch and marked a significant moment in the shifting balance of naval power in Europe.

The Eighty Years' War, or Dutch Revolt, was the war of secession between the Netherlands and the Spanish king, that lasted from 1568 to 1648. The war resulted in the Seven United Provinces being recognized as an independent state. The region now known as Belgium and Luxembourg also became established as the Southern Netherlands, part of the Seventeen Provinces that remained under royal Habsburg rule.

The United Provinces of the Netherlands, or the Dutch Republic, became a world power, through its merchant shipping and huge naval power, and experienced a period of economic, scientific and cultural growth. In the late 16th century military reform by Maurice of Orange laid the foundation for early modern battlefield tactics. The Dutch States Army between 1600 and 1648 was one of the most powerful in Europe, together with the Spanish, English and French.

=== The main battles of the Eighty Years' War ===
- April 23, 1568 Battle of Rheindalen (Often regarded as a mere skirmish)

The Dutch geuzen under the command of the Lord of Villers, Joost de Soete, are defeated by a Spanish Garrison.

- May 23, 1568 Battle of Heiligerlee

First Dutch victory. After a successful ambush the Dutch killed about 700 Spanish troops, while losing 50 men (Including one of their commanders, Adolf of Nassau) of their own.

- July 21, 1568 Battle of Jemmingen

Decisive Spanish victory.

- December 11, 1572 – July 13, 1573 Siege of Haarlem

Spanish victory. More than 10,000 Haarlemers were killed on the ramparts, nearly 2,000 burned or tortured, and double that number drowned in the river.

- June 1574 – October 3, 1574 Siege of Leiden

Dutch victory. During the siege 8,000 of the 18,000 inhabitants of Leiden died. The siege ended because geuzen opened the dikes surrounding the city causing the Spanish troops to flee.

- April 14, 1574 Battle of Mookerheyde

Decisive Spanish victory. Both Dutch commanders, Louis of Nassau and Henry of Nassau were killed.

- January 31, 1578 Battle of Gembloux

Decisive Spanish victory.

- March 12, 1579 – July 1, 1579 Siege of Maastricht

Spanish victory. Spanish troops who breached the city walls first raped the women, then massacred the population, reputedly tearing people limb from limb. Of the city's 30,000 population, only 400 survived.

- July 1584 – August 17, 1585 Siege of Antwerp

Spanish victory. The siege lasted over a year despite 60,000 of the 100,000 inhabitants leaving the city before the Spanish troops arrived.

- September 22, 1586 Battle of Zutphen

Spanish victory.

- March 4, 1590 Siege of Breda

Dutch victory. The Dutch entered Breda on a peatship filled with 70 Dutch soldiers led by Maurice of Nassau, taking the city with minimal casualties.

- January 24, 1597 Battle of Turnhout

Dutch victory. Fifteen cavalry units and several hundred Dutch infantry soldiers defeated a Spanish army of over 5000 men.

- July 2, 1600 Battle of Nieuwpoort

Dutch victory. The Dutch army originally was on a mission to capture the raider port of Dunkirk but was intercepted en route by a Spanish army, resulting in the battle.

- July 5, 1601 – September 16, 1604 Siege of Ostend

Spanish victory. Although eventually victorious, around 55,000 Spanish soldiers died during the siege and this was an important factor during the negotiations for the twelve-year truce (1609–1621) between Spain and the Netherlands. The siege was one of the longest in the entire Eighty Years' War.

- April 25, 1607 Battle of Gibraltar

Decisive Dutch victory. A Dutch fleet attacked and destroyed the Spanish fleet anchored in the Bay of Gibraltar. At a cost of 100 men, including the commanding admiral Jacob van Heemskerck, the Dutch killed 4,000 Spanish sailors and their commanding officer.

- August 28, 1624 – June 5, 1625 Siege of Breda

Spanish victory after a siege of 11 months.

- 1629 Siege of 's-Hertogenbosch

Dutch victory.

- October 31, 1639 Battle of the Downs

Decisive Dutch victory. Dutch ships led by Maarten Tromp attacked the Spanish fleet; 60 of the 77 Spanish warships are destroyed and 15,200 Spanish sailors are reportedly killed (a figure modern historians find dubious), at a cost of 1,000 men killed and several ships torched.

=== The Dutch in the East Indies ===
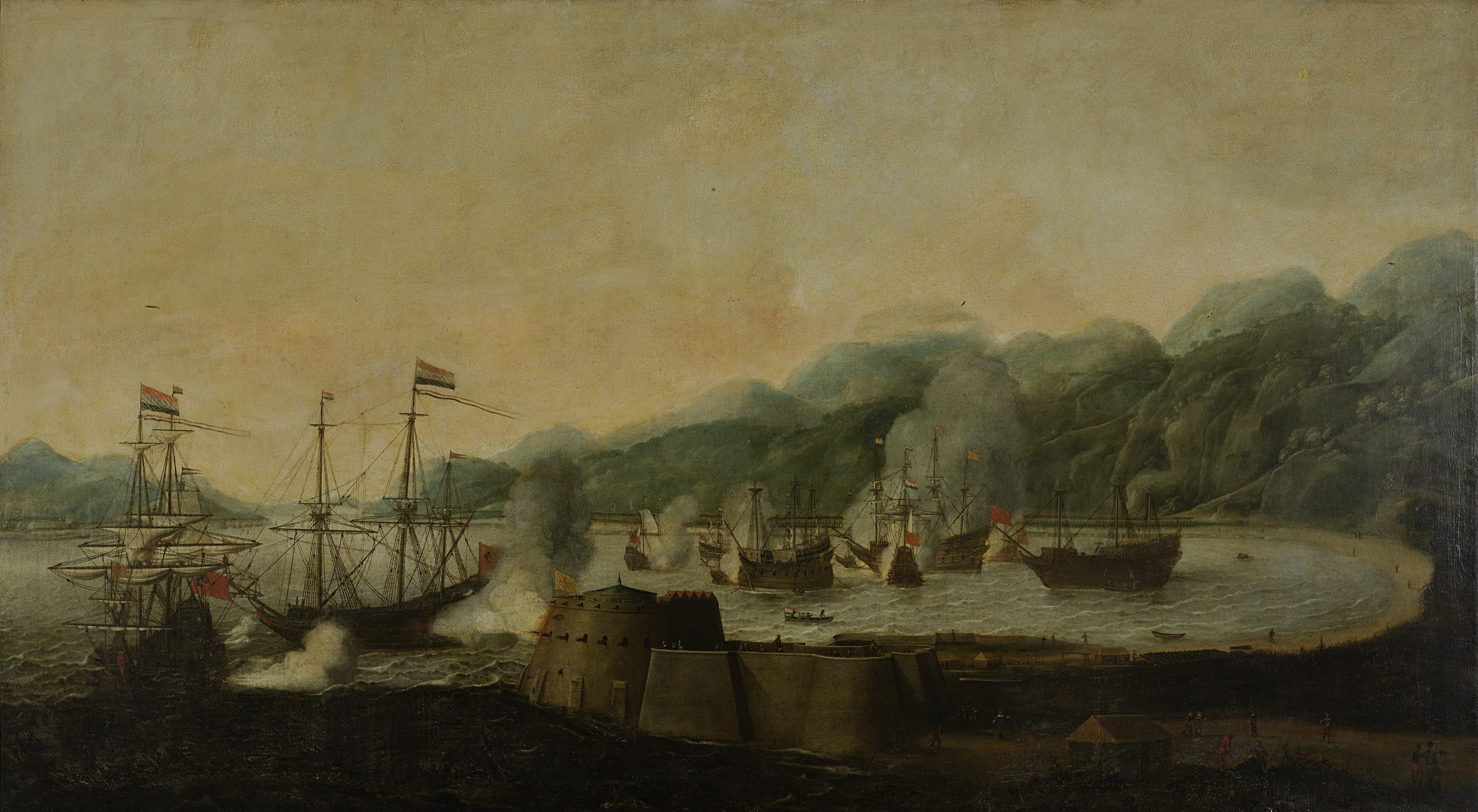
The Dutch East India Company attack three Portuguese Galleons in the Bay of Goa. The Dutch engaged in an armed conflict with the Portuguese in order to expand its trading empire.

The Dutch East India Company (Dutch: Verenigde Oostindische Compagnie or VOC), chartered in 1602, concentrated Dutch trade efforts under one directorate with a unified policy. In 1605 armed Dutch merchantmen captured the Portuguese fort at Amboyna in the Moluccas, which was developed into the first secure base of the VOC. The Twelve Years' Truce signed in Antwerp in 1609 called a halt to formal hostilities between Spain (which controlled Portugal and its territories at the time) and the United Provinces. In the Indies, the foundation of Batavia formed the permanent center from which Dutch enterprises, more mercantile than colonial, could be coordinated. From it "the Dutch wove the immense web of traffic and exchange which would eventually make up their empire, a fragile and flexible one built, like the Portuguese empire, 'on the Phoenician model'." (Braudel 1984, p. 215)

Over the next decades the Dutch captured the major trading ports of the East Indies: Malacca in 1641; Achem (Aceh) in the native kingdom of Sumatra, 1667; Macassar, 1669; and Bantam itself, in 1682. At the same time connections in the ports of India provided the printed cottons that the Dutch traded for pepper, the staple of the spice trade.

The greatest source of wealth in the East Indies, Fernand Braudel has noted, was the trade within the archipelago, what the Dutch called inlandse handel ('native trade'), where one commodity was exchanged for another, with profit at each turn, as silver from the Americas was more desirable in the East than in Europe.

By concentrating on monopolies in the fine spices, Dutch policy encouraged monoculture: Amboyna for cloves, Timor for sandalwood, the Bandas for mace and nutmeg, Ceylon for cinnamon. Monoculture linked island economies to the mercantile system to provide the missing necessities of life.

==== Sino–Dutch conflicts ====
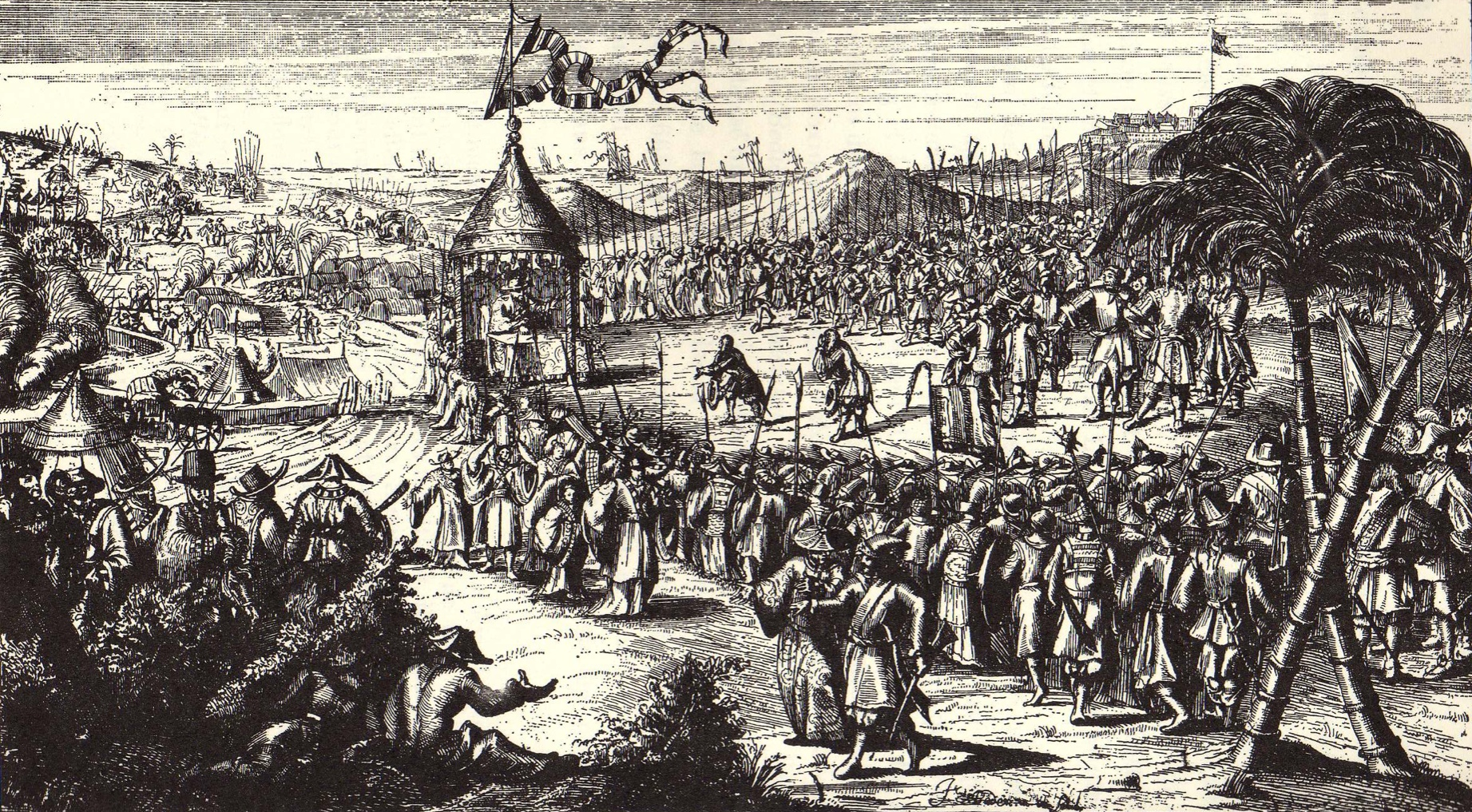
The Dutch surrender of Fort Zeelandia in Formosa shortly following a Ming loyalist siege, 1662. The Dutch fought intermittent battles with the Ming in the 17th century over trade.

The Dutch East India Company was defeated by Ming dynasty China in the Sino–Dutch conflicts during a war over Penghu (the Pescadores) from 1622 to 1624. The Dutch were defeated again by the Chinese at the Battle of Liaoluo Bay in 1633. In 1662, the Dutch East India company's army was defeated by a Chinese Ming dynasty army led by Koxinga at the Siege of Fort Zeelandia on Taiwan. The Chinese used ships and naval bombardment with cannon to force a surrender. The expulsion of the Dutch ended their colonial rule over Taiwan.

==== Cambodian–Dutch War ====
The Cambodians defeated the Dutch East India Company in a war from 1643 to 1644 on the Mekong River.

==== Trịnh–Nguyễn War ====
The Vietnamese Nguyen Lords defeated the Dutch East India Company in a 1643 battle during the Trịnh–Nguyễn War, blowing up a Dutch ship.

== Wars of the Dutch Republic ==
The Republic of the Seven United Netherlands (Republiek der Zeven Verenigde Nederlanden/Provinciën; also Dutch Republic or United Provinces in short) was a European republic between 1581 (but was formally recognised in 1648) and 1795, which is now known as the Netherlands. From an economic and military perspective, the Republic of the United Provinces was extremely successful. This time period is known in the Netherlands as the Golden Age. The free trade spirit of the time received a strong augmentation through the development of a modern stock market in the Low Countries. At first the Dutch had a very strong standing field army and large garrisons in their numerous fortified cities. From 1648 on however the Army was neglected; and for a few years even the Navy fell into neglect— until rivalry with England forced a large extension of naval forces.

The Anglo-Dutch Wars (Dutch: Engelse Oorlogen) were fought in the 17th and 18th centuries between Britain and the United Provinces for control over the seas and trade routes. They are known as the Dutch Wars in England and as the English Wars in the Netherlands.

=== Scilly "War" (1651-1986) ===
In 1651, one of the last possessions held by the English Royalists (partisans of Charles II of England against the Commonwealth of England declared by the Rump Parliament) was the Isles of Scilly, off Cornwall. From these islands, governed by Sir John Grenville, and from other friendly ports, a section of the Royal Navy that had mutinied to Charles' side operated in a piratical way against shipping in the English channel.

The Dutch declared war against the Scillies as a legal fiction which would cover a hostile response to the Royalist fleet. In July 1651, soon after the declaration of war, the Parliamentarian forces under Admiral Robert Blake forced the Royalist fleet to surrender. The Netherlands fleet, no longer under threat, left without firing a shot. However, due to the obscurity of one nation's declaration of war against a small part of another, the Dutch forgot to officially declare peace.

In 1985, the historian and Chairman of the Isles of Scilly Council Roy Duncan, wrote to the Dutch Embassy in London to dispose of the "myth" that the islands were still at war. But embassy staff found the myth to be accurate and Duncan invited Ambassador Jonkheer Rein Huydecoper to visit the islands and sign a peace treaty. Peace was declared on April 17, 1986, a stunning 335 years after the war began.

=== The first Anglo-Dutch War (1652–1654) ===
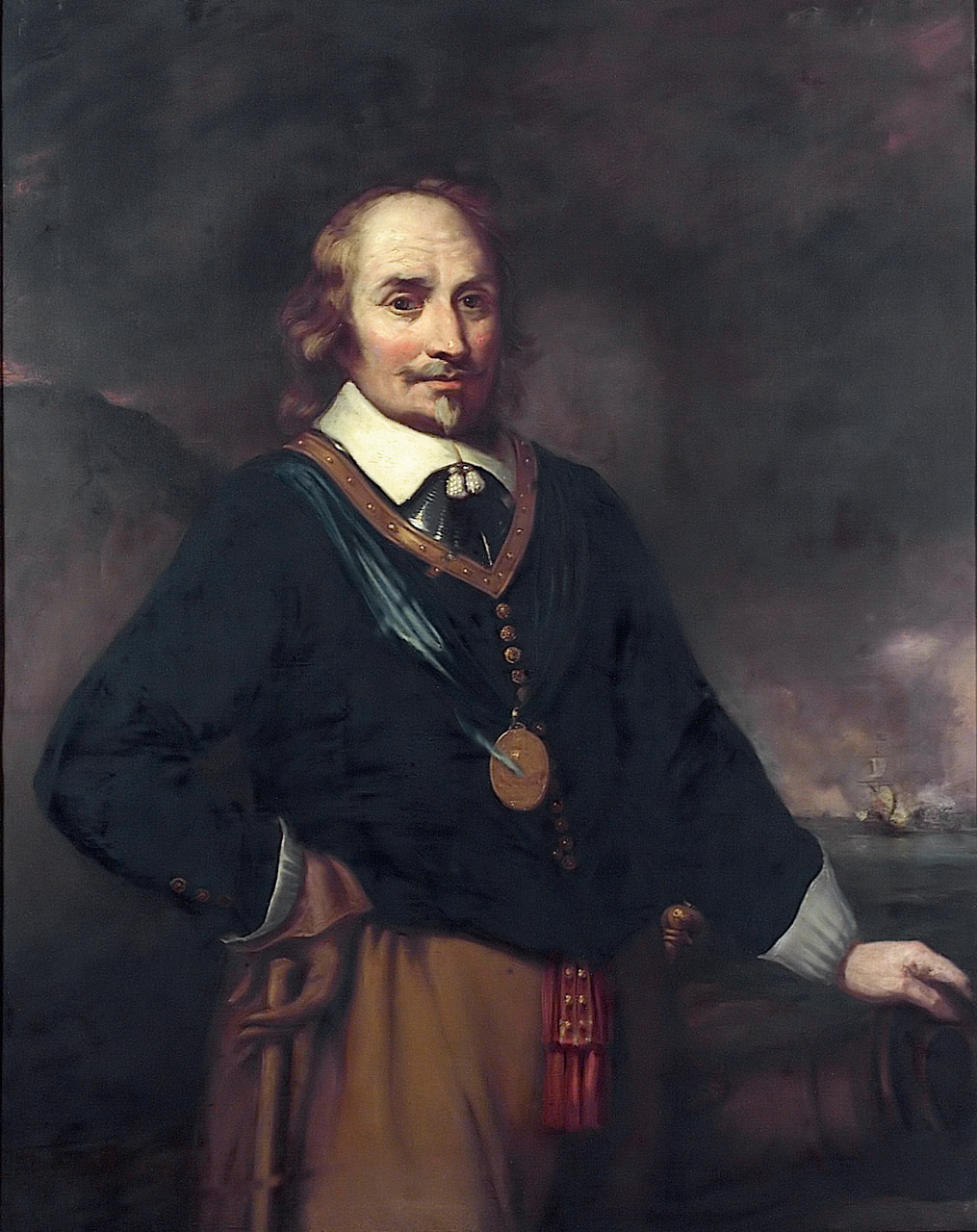
Maarten Tromp was the supreme commander and Lieutenant-Admiral of the Dutch Navy during the First Anglo-Dutch War.

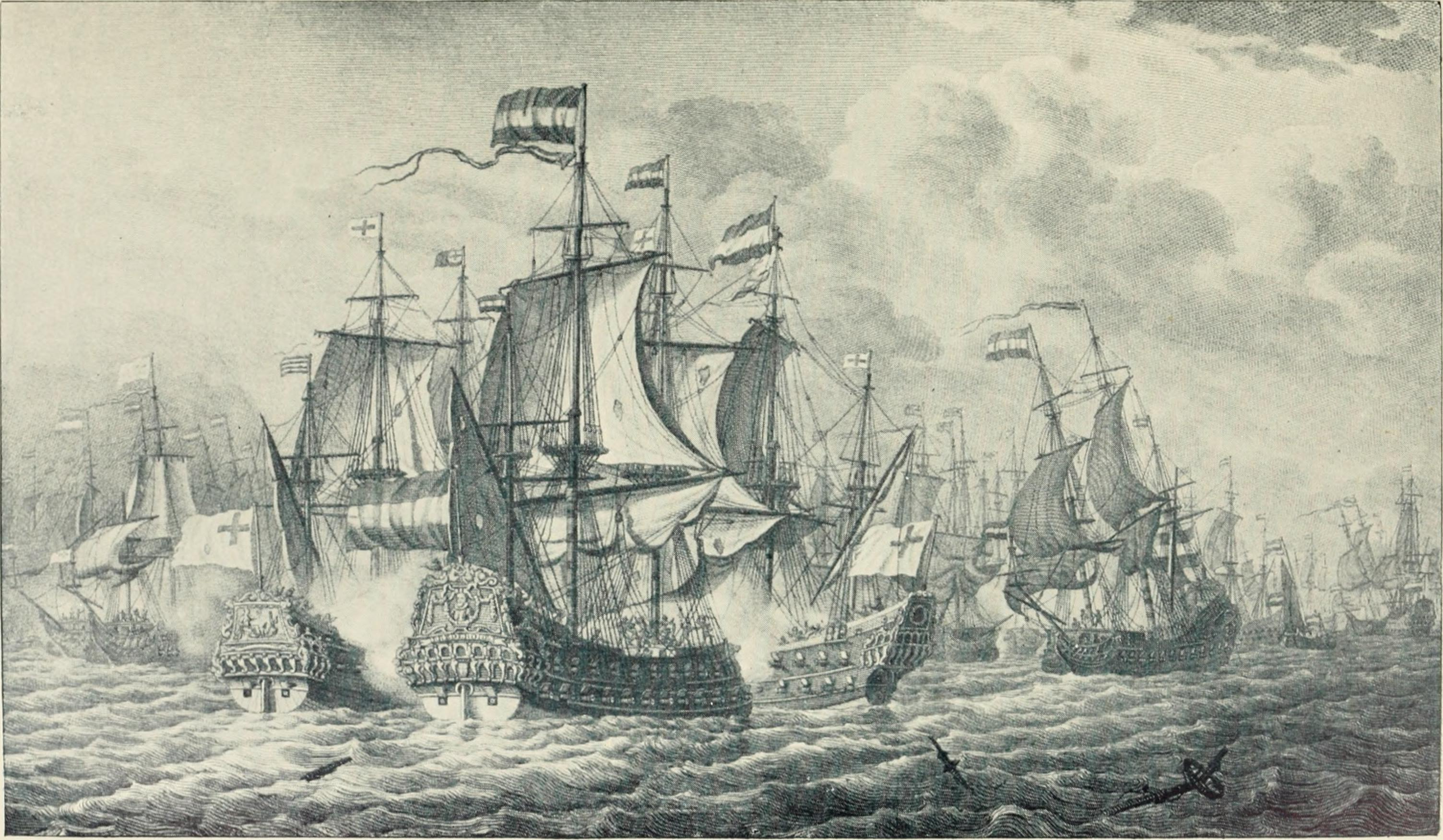
The Battle of Dungeness was a decisive Dutch victory during the First Anglo-Dutch War, that saw the Dutch gain temporary control of the English Channel.

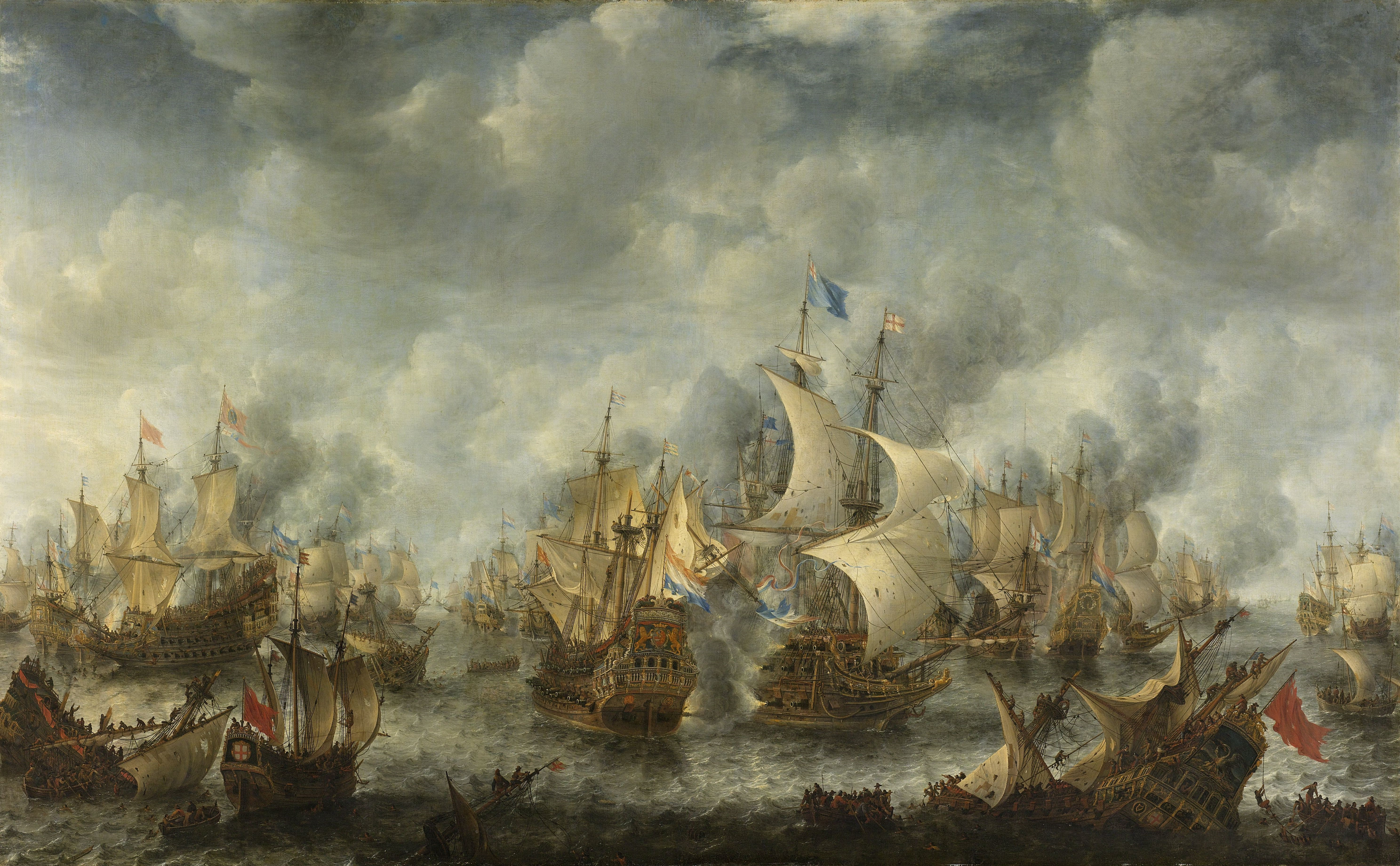
The Battle of Scheveningen in 1653 was the final battle of the First Anglo-Dutch War.

The collapse of Spanish power at the end of the Thirty Years' War in 1648 meant that the colonial possessions of the Portuguese and Spanish Empires were effectively up for grabs. This brought the Commonwealth of England and the United Provinces of the Netherlands, former allies in the Thirty Years' War, into conflict. The Dutch had the largest mercantile fleet of Europe, and a dominant position in European trade. They had annexed most of Portugal's territory in the East Indies giving them control over the enormously profitable trade in spices. They were even gaining significant influence over England's maritime trade with her North American colonies, profiting from the turmoil that resulted from the English Civil War. However, the Dutch navy had been neglected during this time period, while Cromwell had built a strong fleet.

In order to protect its position in North America and damage Dutch trade, in 1651 the Parliament of the Commonwealth of England passed the first of the Navigation Acts, which mandated that all goods from her American colonies must be carried by English ships. In a period of growing mercantilism this was the spark that ignited the first Anglo-Dutch war, the British seeking a pretext to start a war which led to sporadic naval engagements across the globe.

The English were initially successful, Admiral Robert Blake defeating the Dutch Admiral Witte de With in the Battle of the Kentish Knock in 1652. Believing that the war was all but over, the English divided their forces and in 1653 were routed by the fleet of Dutch Admiral Maarten Tromp at the Battle of Dungeness in the English Channel. The Dutch were also victorious at the Battle of Leghorn and had effective control of both the Mediterranean and the English Channel. Blake, recovering from an injury, rethought, together with George Monck, the whole system of naval tactics, and in mid-1653 used the Dutch line of battle method to drive the Dutch navy back to its ports in the battles of Portland and the Gabbard. In the final Battle of Scheveningen on August 10, 1653, Tromp was killed, a blow to Dutch morale, but the British were forced to end their blockade of the Dutch coast. As both nations were by now exhausted, peace negotiations were started.

The war ended on 1654-04-05 with the signing of the Treaty of Westminster, but the commercial rivalry was not resolved, the British having failed to replace the Dutch as the world's dominant trade nation.

==== Battles ====
- May 29, 1652 Battle of Dover

Draw, moral English victory

- August 26, 1652 Battle of Plymouth

Minor Dutch victory

- October 8, 1652 Battle of the Kentish Knock

English victory

- December 10, 1652 Battle of Dungeness

Dutch victory

- March 14, 1653 Battle of Leghorn

Dutch victory

- February 28 until March 2, 1653 Battle of Portland

English victory, but moral victory for the Dutch as their fleet escaped certain destruction.

- June 13, 1653 Battle of the Gabbard

English victory

- August 8–10, 1653 Battle of Scheveningen

English tactical victory, strategic Dutch victory

=== Dutch-Swedish War (1657–1660) ===
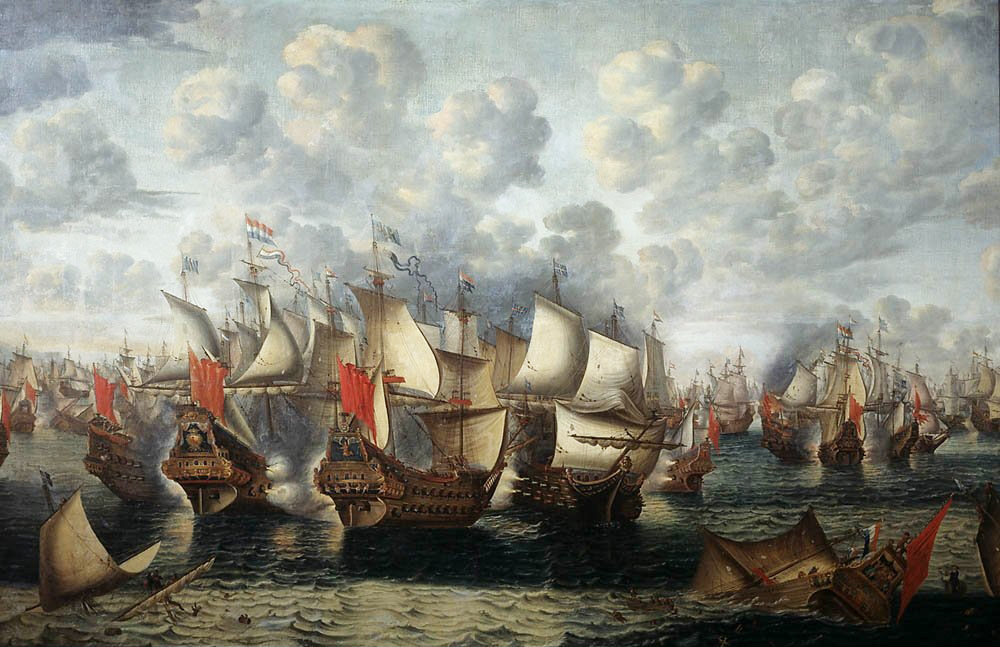
The Dutch intervened in the Second Northern War and lifted the Swedish siege of Copenhagen during the Battle of the Sound, 1658.

The Dutch-Swedish War, 1657–1660, was a Dutch intervention in the Northern Wars. When Charles X Gustav of Sweden had been unable to continue his hold on Poland — partly because the Dutch fleet relieved the besieged city of Danzig in 1656 — he turned his attention on Denmark, invading that country from what is now Germany. He broke a new agreement with Frederick III of Denmark and laid siege to Copenhagen. To the Dutch the Baltic trade was vital, both in quantity and quality. The Dutch had been able to convince Denmark, by threat of force, to keep the Sound tolls at a low level but they feared a strong Swedish empire would not be so complying. In 1658 they sent an expedition fleet of 75 ships, 3,000 cannon and 15000 troops; in the Battle of the Sound it defeated the Swedish fleet and relieved Copenhagen. In 1659 the Dutch liberated the other Danish Isles and the essential supply of grain, wood and iron from the Baltic was guaranteed once more.

=== The second Anglo-Dutch War (1665–1667) ===
After the English Restoration, Charles II tried to serve his dynastic interests by attempting to make Prince William III of Orange, his nephew, stadtholder of The Republic, using military pressure. This led to a surge of patriotism in England, the country being, as Samuel Pepys put it, "mad for war". This war, deliberately provoked by the English in 1664, witnessed several significant English victories in battle, (but also some Dutch ones such as the capture of HMS Prince Royal during the Four Days Battle in 1666 which was the subject of a famous painting by Willem van de Velde). However, the Raid on the Medway (entailing the burning of part of the English fleet whilst docked at Chatham in June 1667 when a flotilla of ships led by Admiral de Ruyter broke through the defensive chains guarding the Medway and wrought havoc on the English ships as well as the capture of the Royal Navy's flagship HMS Royal Charles) saw the war ended with a Dutch victory. For several years the greatly expanded Dutch Navy was the most powerful navy in the world. The Republic was at the zenith of its power.

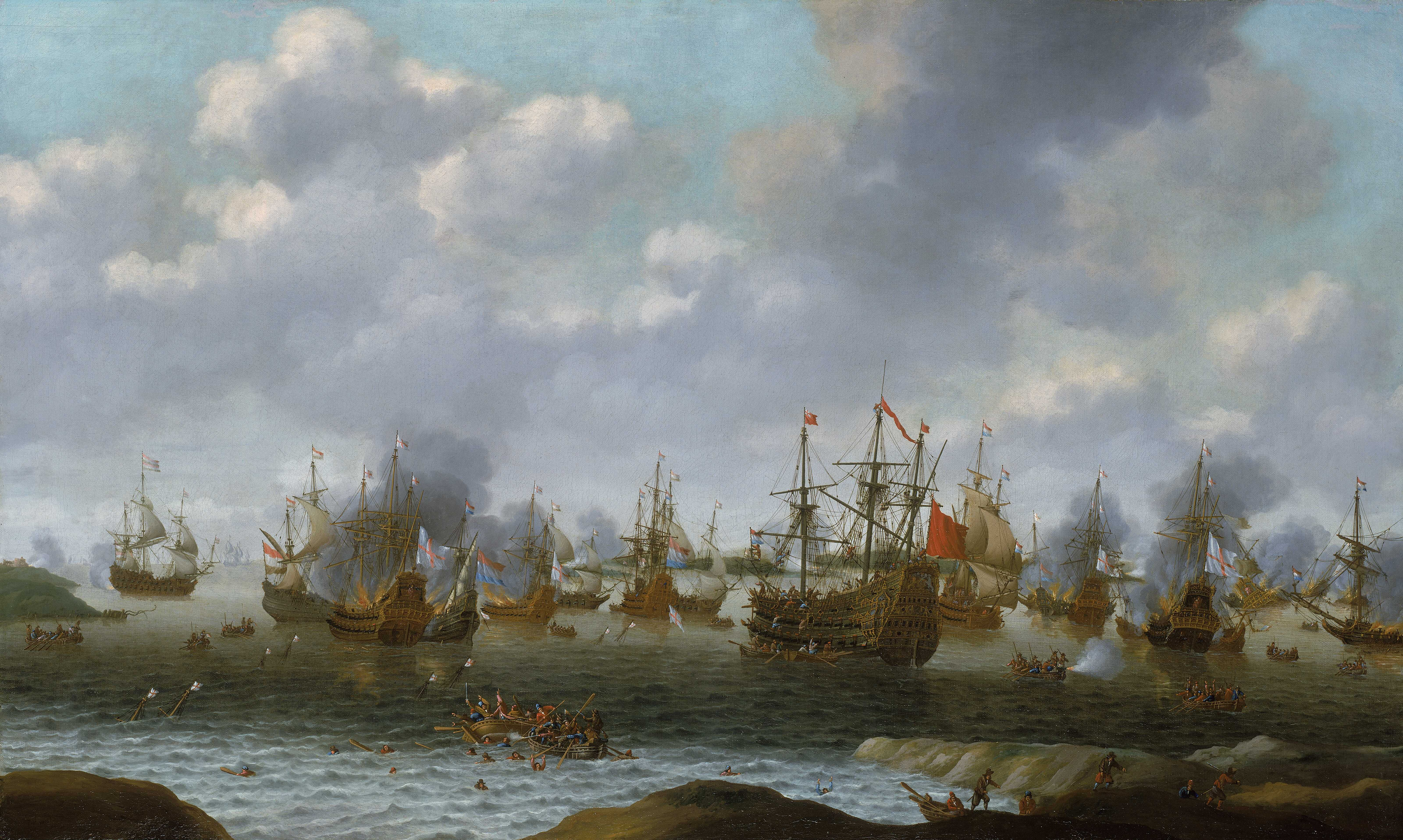
The Raid on the Medway in 1667 was a successful Dutch attack on English ships of the line. The raid led to the end to the Second Anglo-Dutch War, on favourable terms for the Dutch.

==== Battles ====
- June 13, 1665 Battle of Lowestoft

Dutch catastrophic defeat, arguably the worst defeat in Dutch naval history.

- June 1 until June 4, 1666 Four Days Battle

Dutch victory.

- August 4 and 5, 1666 St James' Day Battle

English victory, but the main body of the Dutch fleet escaped, while the Dutch rear beat its counterpart.

- June 1667 Raid on the Medway

Decisive Dutch victory, the worst defeat in the Royal Navy's history.

=== The Franco-Dutch War (1672–1678) and the third Anglo-Dutch War (1672–1674) ===
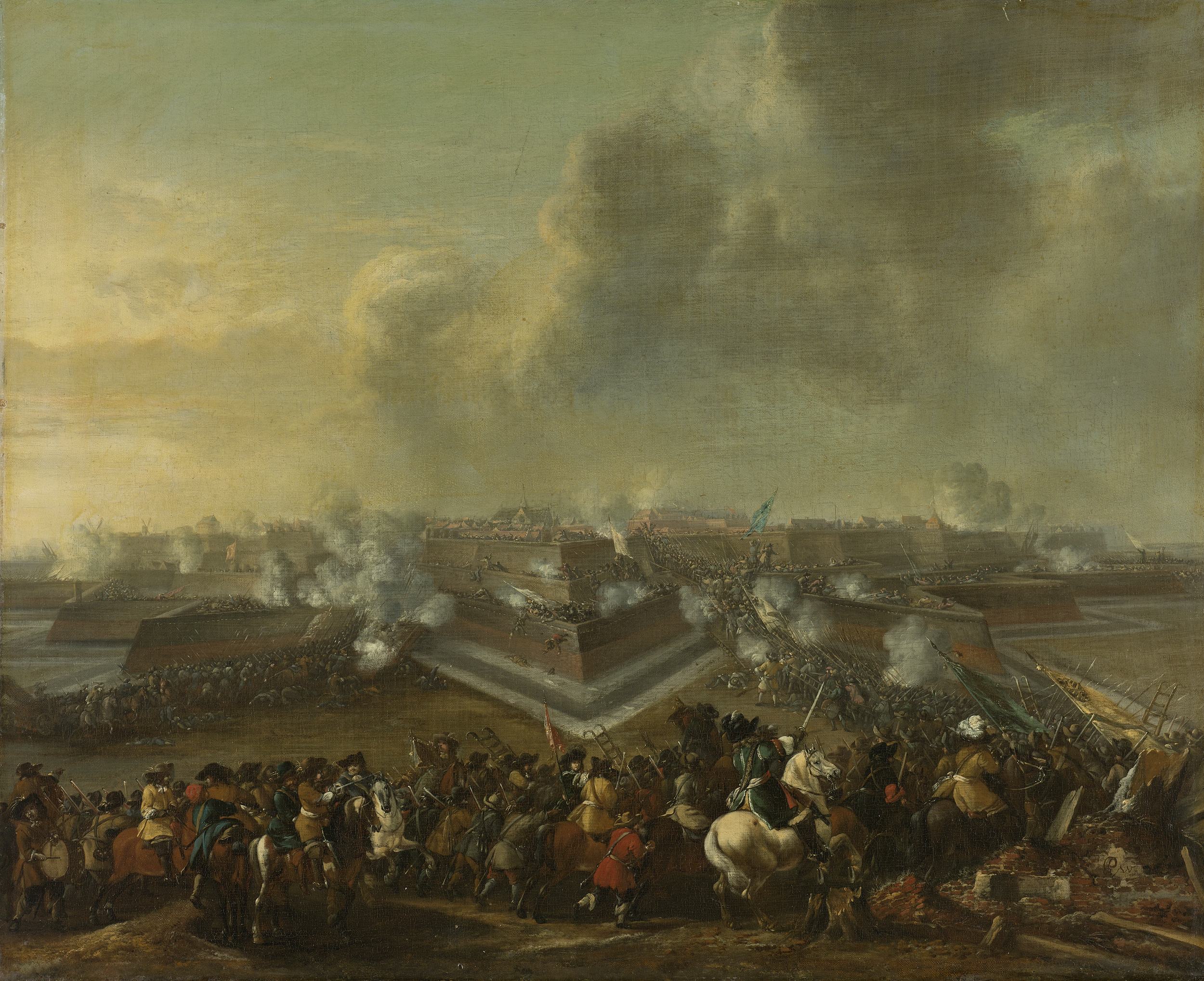
Dutch forces storming Coevorden during the Franco-Dutch War, 1672.

Franco-Dutch War (1672–1678) was a war fought between France and a quadruple alliance consisting of Brandenburg, the Holy Roman Empire, Spain, and the United Provinces. The war ended with the Treaty of Nijmegen (1678); this granted France control of the Franche-Comté (from Spain).

France led a coalition including Münster and Great Britain. Louis XIV was annoyed by the Dutch refusal to cooperate in the destruction and division of the Spanish Netherlands. As the Dutch army had been neglected, the French had no trouble by-passing the fortress of Maastricht and then marching to the heart of the Republic, taking Utrecht. Prince William III of Orange is assumed to have had the leading Dutch politician Johan de Witt deposed and murdered, and was acclaimed stadtholder. The French were halted by inundations, the Dutch Water Line, after Louis tarried too much in conquering the whole of the Republic. He had promised the major Dutch cities to the British and tried to extort huge sums from the Dutch in exchange for a separate peace. The bishop of Münster laid siege to Groningen but failed. 1672 is known as the rampjaar ("disaster year") in Dutch history, in which the country only nearly survived the combined English-French-German assault.

Soon after the second Anglo-Dutch War, the English navy was rebuilt. After the embarrassing events in the previous war, English public opinion was unenthusiastic about starting a new one. Bound by the Secret Treaty of Dover Charles II was however obliged to assist Louis XIV in his attack on The Republic in the Franco-Dutch War. This he did willingly, having manipulated the French and Dutch into war. The French army being halted by inundations, and an attempt was made to invade The Republic by sea. Admiral Michiel de Ruyter, gaining four strategic victories against the Anglo-French fleet, prevented invasion. After these failures the English parliament forced Charles to sign a peace in 1674.

Already, allies had joined the Dutch — the Elector of Brandenburg, the Emperor, and Charles II of Spain. Louis, despite the successful Siege of Maastricht in 1673, was forced to abandon his plans of conquering the Dutch and revert to a slow, cautious war of attrition around the French frontiers. By 1678, he had managed to break apart his opponents' coalition, and managed to gain considerable territories by the terms of the Treaty of Nijmegen. Most notably, the French acquired the Franche-Comté and various territories in the Netherlands from the Spanish. Nevertheless, the Dutch had thwarted the ambitions of two of the major royal dynasties of the time: the Stuarts and the Bourbons.

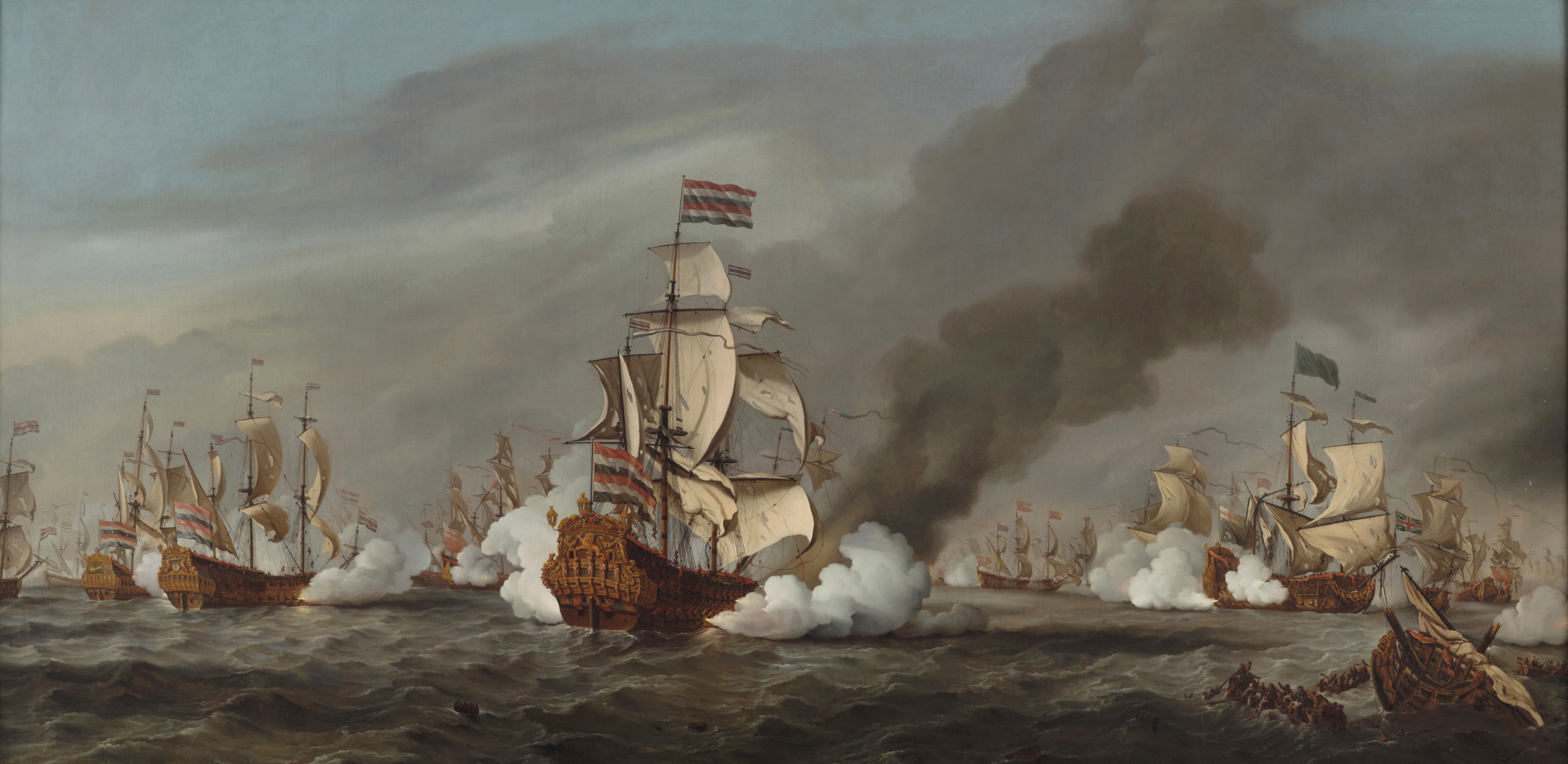
The Dutch Navy defeated the combined English and French fleets during the Battle of Texel, 1673.

==== Battles ====
- June 7, 1672 Battle of Solebay

Tactical draw, Dutch strategic victory.

- June 2, 1673 First Battle of Schooneveld

Dutch minor victory.

- June 14, 1673 Second Battle of Schooneveld

Dutch minor victory.

- August 11, 1673 Battle of Texel

Tactical draw, huge Dutch strategic victory.

- March 14, 1674 Battle of Ronas Voe

Minor battle, English victory

==== Action of March 1677 ====
The action of March 1677 was a maritime battle that took place in March 1677 in the West Indies when a Dutch fleet under Jacob Binckes repulsed a French force attempting to recapture the island of Tobago. Heavy losses were suffered on both sides: one of the Dutch supply ships caught fire and exploded. The fire then quickly spread in the narrow bay causing several ships, among them the French flagship 'Glorieux', to catch fire and explode in turn which resulted in great loss of life on both sides. The French under d'Estrees retreated.

=== Nine Years' War (1688–1697) ===
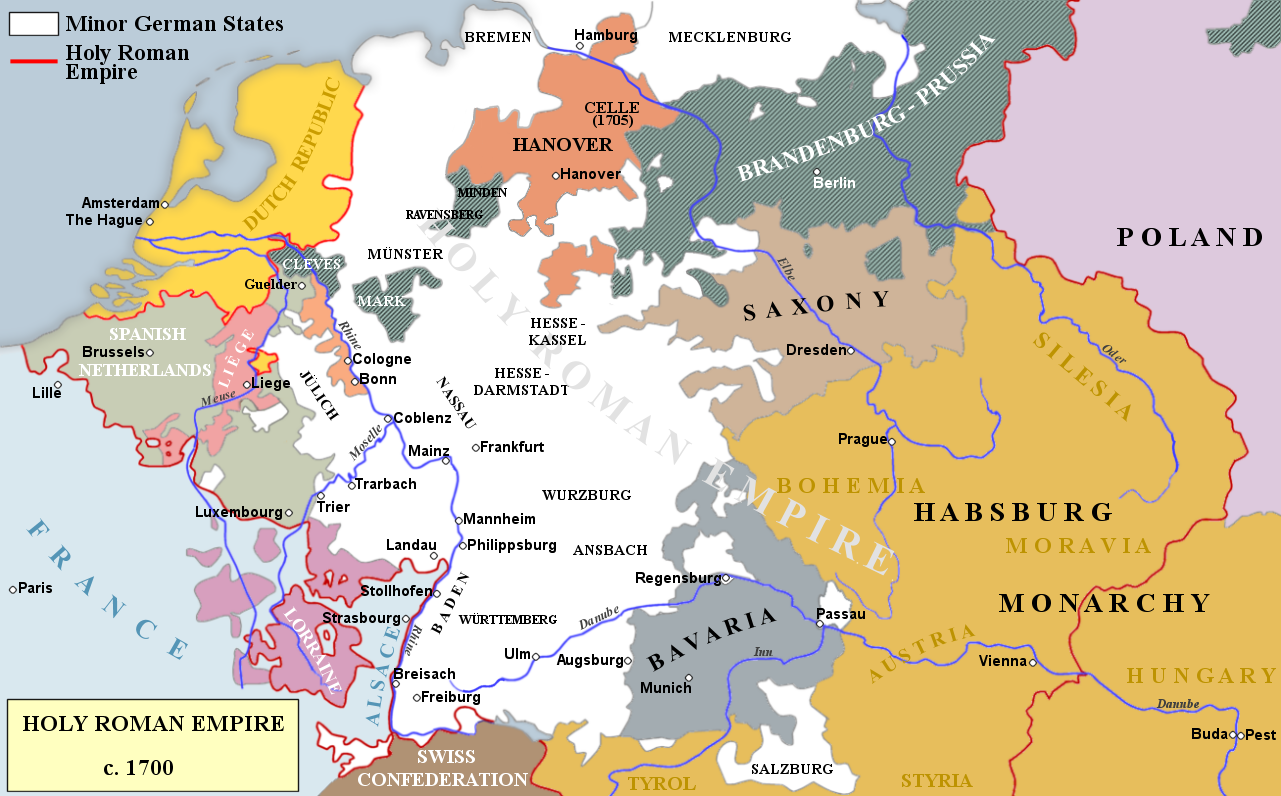
The Holy Roman Empire in 1688, prior to the start of the Nine Years' War. The Dutch Republic joined a European coalition, the Grand Alliance, in an effort to halt Louis XIV's expansionist policies.

The Nine Years' War was a major war fought in Europe and America from 1688 to 1697, between France and the League of Augsburg — which, by 1689, was known as the "Grand Alliance". The war was fought to resist French expansionism along the Rhine, as well as, on the part of England, to safeguard the results of the Glorious Revolution from a possible French-backed restoration of James II. In North America the war was known as King William's War.

==== The League of Augsburg ====
The League of Augsburg was formed in 1686 between the Holy Roman Emperor, Leopold I, and various of the German princes (including the Palatinate, Bavaria, and Brandenburg) to resist French expansionism in Germany. The alliance was joined by Portugal, Spain, Sweden, and the United Provinces.

France had expected a benevolent neutrality on the part of James II's England, but after James's deposition and replacement by his son-in-law William of Orange, Louis's inveterate enemy, England declared war on France in May 1689, and the League of Augsburg became known as the "Grand Alliance", with England, Portugal, Spain, the United Provinces, and most of the German states joined to fight France.

==== Campaign in the Netherlands ====
In the war's principal theatre, in continental Europe, the early military campaigns, which mostly occurred in the Spanish Netherlands, were generally successful for France. After a setback at the Battle of Walcourt in August 1689, in which the French were defeated by an allied army under Prince Georg Friedrich of Waldeck, the French under Marshal Luxembourg were successful at the Battle of Fleurus in 1690, but Louis prevented Luxembourg from following up on his victory. The French were also successful in the Alps in 1690, with Marshal Catinat defeating the Duke of Savoy at the Battle of Staffarda and occupying Savoy. The Turkish recapture of Belgrade in October of the same year proved a boon to the French, preventing the Emperor from making peace with the Turks and sending his full forces west. The French were also successful at sea, defeating the Anglo-Dutch fleet at Beachy Head, but failed to follow up on the victory by sending aid to the Jacobite forces in Ireland or pursuing control of the Channel.

The French followed up on their success in 1691 with Luxembourg's capture of Mons and Halle and his defeat of Waldeck at the Battle of Leuze, while Marshal Catinat continued his advance into Italy, and another French army advanced into Catalonia, and in 1692 Namur was captured by a French army under the direct command of the King, and the French beat back an allied offensive under William of Orange at the Battle of Steenkerque.

==== Early French dominance ====
When the war began in 1689, the British Admiralty was still suffering from the disorders of the reign of King Charles II, which had been only in part corrected during the short reign of James II. The first squadrons were sent out late and in insufficient strength. The Dutch, crushed by the obligation to maintain a great army, found an increasing difficulty in preparing their fleet for action early. Louis XIV, with as yet inexhausted resources, had it within his power to strike first.

==== English and Dutch resurgence ====
A large French fleet entered the English Channel, and gained a success over the combined British and Dutch fleets on July 10, 1690, in the Battle of Beachy Head, which was not followed up by vigorous action. During the following year, while James's cause was finally ruined in Ireland, the main French fleet was cruising in the Bay of Biscay, principally for the purpose of avoiding battle. During the whole of 1689, 1690 and 1691, British squadrons were active on the Irish coast -helping to win the Williamite war in Ireland for the allies. One raised the siege of Derry in July 1689, and another convoyed the first British and Dutch forces sent over under the Duke of Schomberg. Immediately after Beachy Head in 1690, a part of the Channel fleet carried out an expedition under the Earl of Marlborough, which took Cork and reduced a large part of the south of the island. William of Orange himself arrived in Ireland in 1690 with veteran Dutch and allied troops, defeating James II at the Battle of the Boyne - an engagement largely decided by Dutch infantry. The war was ended in Anglo-Dutch favour in 1691, when Dutch general Ginkel destroyed the Franco-Irish army at the Battle of Aughrim.

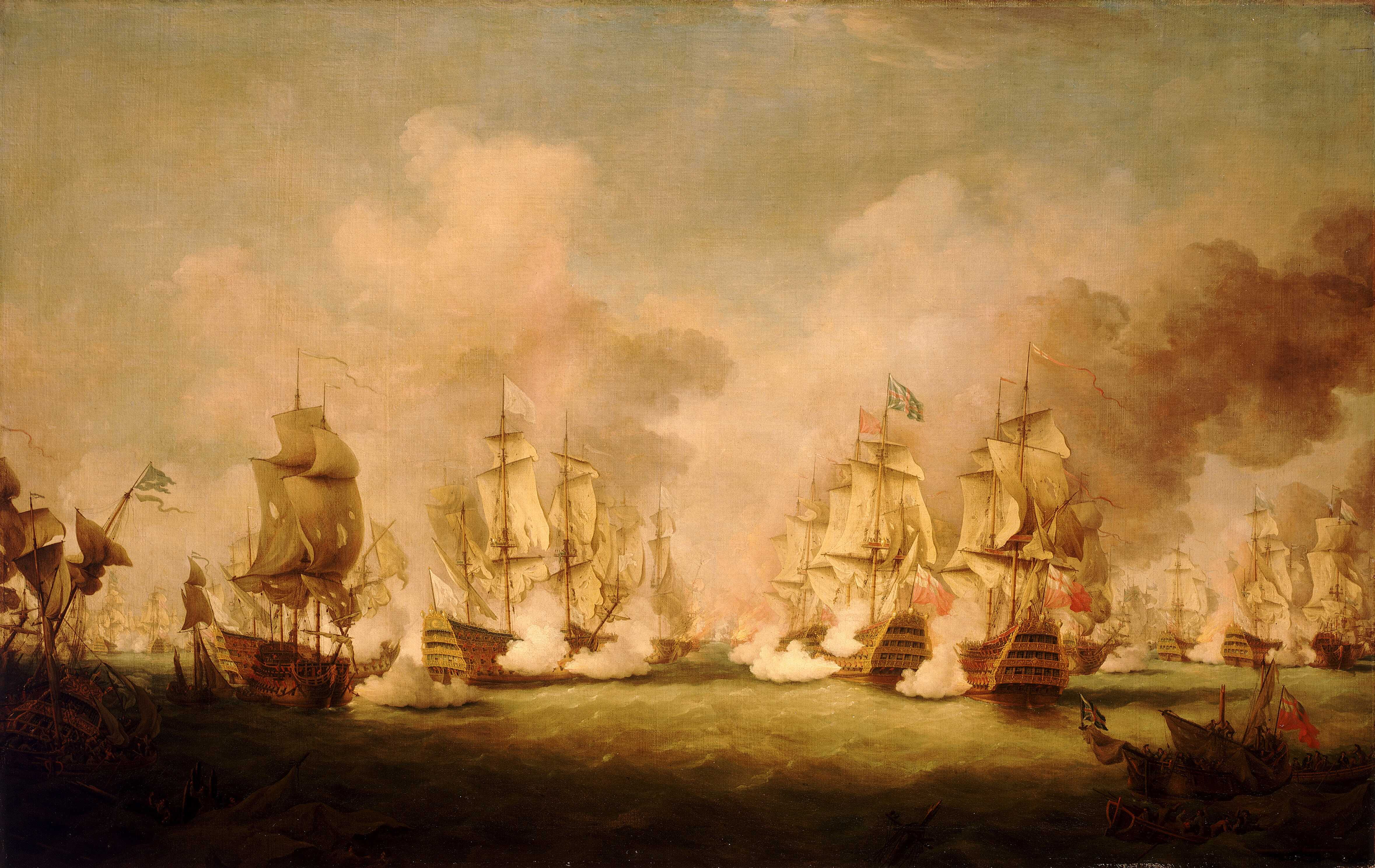
A French invasion of England was prevented in 1692, when a combined Dutch and English fleet Battles of Barfleur and La Hogue defeated the French fleet intended to cover the transportation of the invasion force.

In 1691, the French did little more than help to carry away the wreckage of their allies and their own detachments. In 1692 a vigorous but tardy attempt was made to employ their fleet to cover an invasion of England at the Battle of La Hougue. It ended in defeat, and the allies remained masters of the Channel. The defeat of La Hougue did not do so much harm to Louis's naval power, and in the next year, 1693, he was able to strike a severe blow at the Allies.

In this instance, the arrangements of the allied governments and admirals were not good. They made no effort to blockade Brest, nor did they take effective steps to discover whether or not the French fleet had left the port. The convoy was seen beyond the Scilly Isles by the main fleet. But as the French admiral Tourville had left Brest for the Straits of Gibraltar with a powerful force and had been joined by a squadron from Toulon, the whole convoy was scattered or taken by him, in the latter days of June, near Lagos Bay. Although this success was a very fair equivalent for the defeat at La Hogue, it was the last serious effort made by the navy of Louis XIV in this war. Want of money compelled him to lay his fleet up.

The allies were now free to make full use of their own, to harass the French coast, to intercept French commerce, and to cooperate with the armies acting against France. Some of the operations undertaken by them were more remarkable for the violence of the effort than for the magnitude of the results. The numerous bombardments of French Channel ports, and the attempts to destroy Saint-Malo, the great nursery of the active French privateers, by infernal machines, did little harm. A British attack on Brest in June 1694 was beaten off with heavy loss, the scheme having been betrayed by Jacobite correspondents. Yet the inability of the French king to avert these enterprises showed the weakness of his navy and the limitations of his power. The protection of British and Dutch commerce was never complete, for the French privateers were active to the end, but French commerce was wholly ruined.

=== The Fourth Anglo-Dutch War (1780–1784) ===
The Glorious Revolution of 1688 was the last successful invasion of England and ended the conflict by placing Prince William III of Orange on the English throne as co-ruler with his wife Mary II. Though this was in fact a military conflict between Great Britain and The Republic, William invading the British Isles with a Dutch fleet and army, in English histories it is never described as such because he had strong support in England and was partly serving the dynastic interests of his wife.

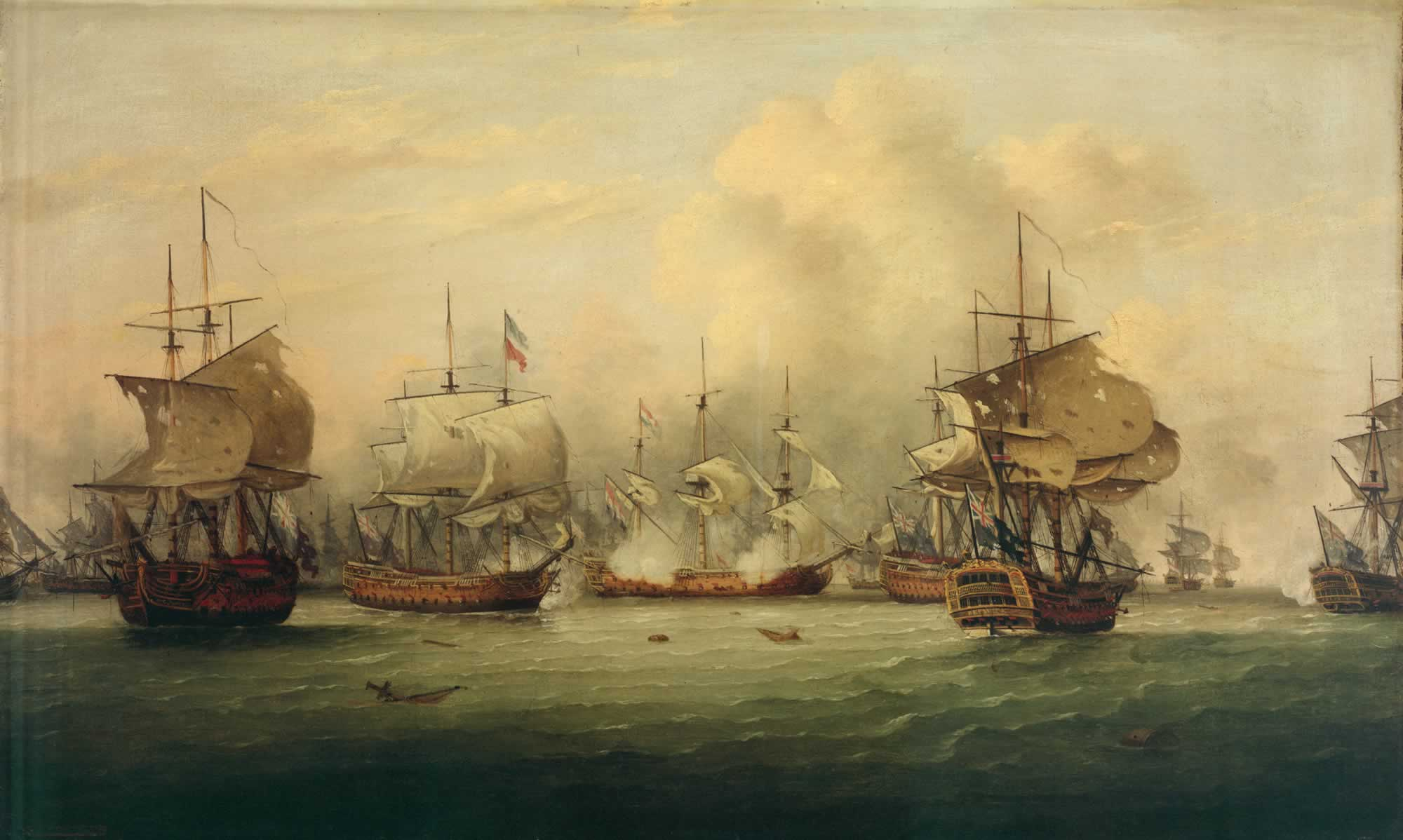
The Battle of the Dogger Bank, a naval engagement during the Fourth Anglo-Dutch War. Oil painting by Thomas Luny.

The regime change was a major contributing factor in the economic decline of the Dutch Republic. The Dutch merchant elite immediately began to use London as a new operational base. Dutch economic growth slowed. William ordered that any Anglo-Dutch fleet be under British command, with the Dutch navy having 60% of the strength of the British. From about 1720 Dutch wealth declined. Between 1740 and 1770 the Dutch Navy was neglected. Around 1780 the per capita gross national product of the Kingdom of Great Britain surpassed that of the Dutch Republic.

The Dutch Republic, nominally neutral, had been trading with the Americans during the American Revolutionary War, exchanging Dutch arms and munitions for American colonial wares (in contravention of the British Navigation Acts), primarily through activity based in St. Eustatius, before the French formally entered the war. The British considered this trade to include contraband military supplies and had attempted to stop it, at first diplomatically by appealing to previous treaty obligations, interpretation of whose terms the two nations disagreed on, and then by searching and seizing Dutch merchant ships. The situation escalated when the British seized a Dutch merchant convoy sailing under Dutch naval escort in December 1779, prompting the Dutch to join the League of Armed Neutrality. Britain responded to this decision by declaring war on the Dutch in December 1780, sparking the Fourth Anglo-Dutch War.

The Dutch navy was by now only a shadow of its former self, having only about twenty ships of the line, so there were no large fleet battles. The English tried to reduce the Republic to the status of a British protectorate, using Prussian military pressure and gaining factual control over most of the Dutch colonies, those conquered during the war given back at war's end. The Dutch then still held some key positions in the European trade with Asia, such as the Cape, Ceylon and Malacca. The war sparked a new round of Dutch ship building (95 warships in the last quarter of the 18th century), but the British kept their absolute numerical superiority by doubling their fleet in the same time.

==== Battles ====
- August 5, 1781 Battle of Dogger Bank

Indecisive outcome. No ships were lost on either side; this alone meant a moral victory for the Dutch.

== Batavian Republic and French rule ==
Against this background it is less surprising that, after the French Revolution, when Republican troops invaded and occupied the Netherlands in 1795, the French encountered so little united resistance. William V of Orange fled to England. The Patriots proclaimed the short-lived Batavian Republic, but government was soon returned to stabler and more experienced hands. In 1806 Napoleon restyled the Netherlands (along with a small part of what is now Germany) into the Kingdom of Holland, with his brother Louis (Lodewijk) Bonaparte as king. This too was short-lived, however. Napoleon incorporated the Netherlands into the French empire after his brother put Dutch interests ahead of those of the French. The French occupation of the Netherlands ended in 1813 after Napoleon was defeated, a defeat in which William of Orange played a prominent role.

=== Batavian Republic (1795–1806) ===
From 1795 to 1806, the Batavian Republic (Bataafse Republiek in Dutch) designated the Netherlands as a republic modeled after the French Republic, to which it was a vassal state.

The Batavian Republic was proclaimed on January 19, 1795, a day after stadtholder William V of Orange fled to England. The invading French revolutionary army, however, found quite a few allies in the Netherlands. Eight years before, the Orange faction had won the upper hand in a small, but nasty civil war only thanks to the military intervention of the King of Prussia, brother-in-law of the stadtholder. Many of the revolutionaries (see: Patriottentijd) had fled to France and now returned eager to realize their ideals.

In contrast to events in France, revolutionary changes in the Netherlands occurred comparatively peacefully. The country had been a republic for two centuries and had a limited nobility. The guillotine proved unnecessary to the new state. The old Republic had been a very archaic and ineffective political construction, still largely based on old feudal institutions. Decision-making had proceeded very slowly and sometimes did not happen at all. The individual provinces had possessed so much power that they blocked many sensible innovations. The Batavian Republic marked the transition to a more centralised and functional government, from a loose confederation of (at least nominally) independent provinces to a true unitary state. Many of its innovations were retained in later times, such as the first official spelling standard of the Dutch language by Siegenbeek (1804). Jews, Lutherans and Roman Catholics were given equal rights. A Bill of Rights was drafted.

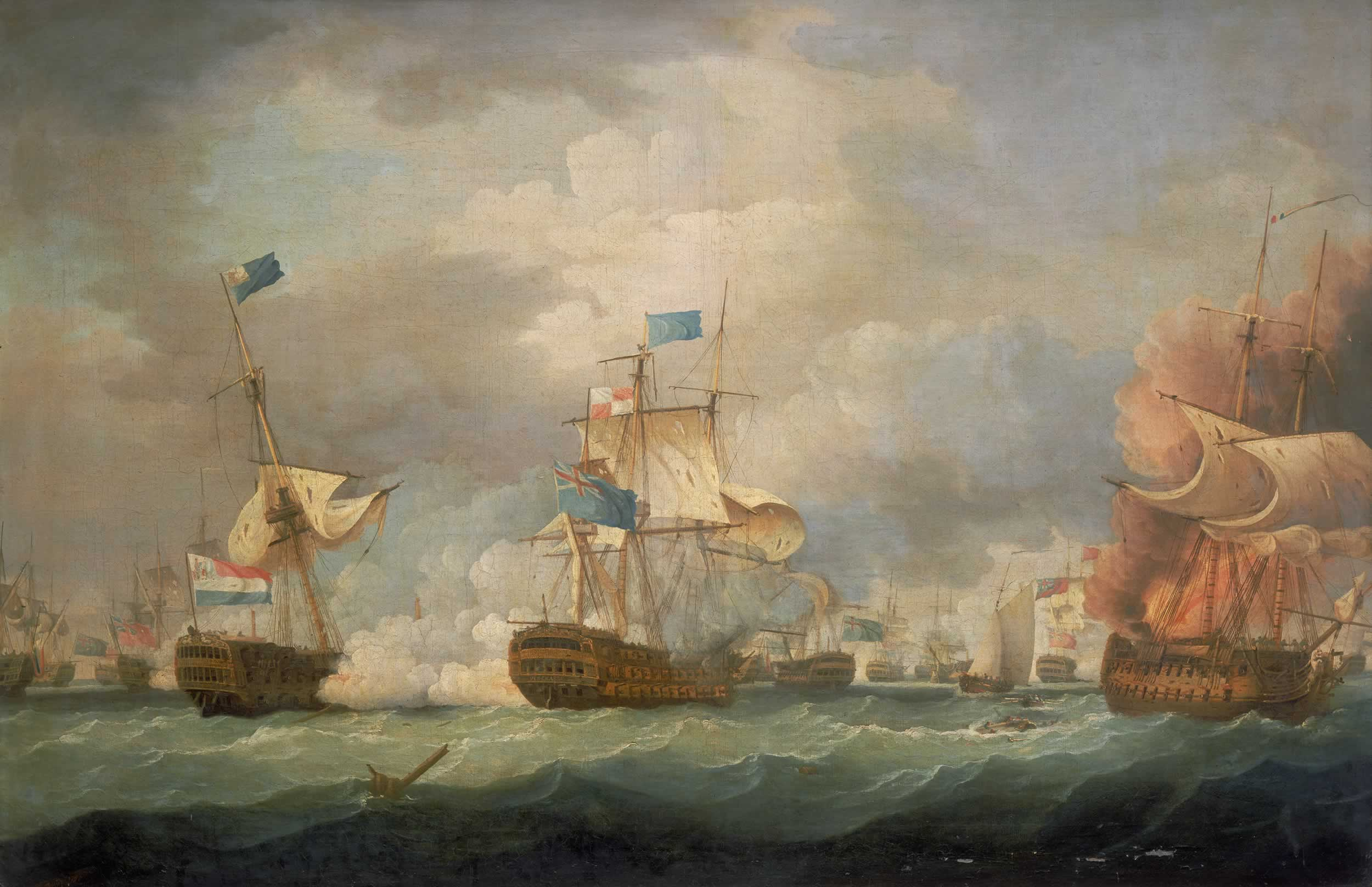
The Battle of Camperdown saw the capture of 11 ships of the Batavian Navy by the Royal Navy.

The new Republic took its name from the Batavi, a Germanic tribe who had lived in the area of the Netherlands in Roman times and who were then romantically regarded as the ancestors of the Dutch nation.

Again in contrast to France, the new Republic did not experience a reign of terror or become a dictatorship. Changes were imposed from outside after Napoleon Bonaparte's rise to power. In 1805 Napoleon installed the shrewd politician Schimmelpenninck as raadspensionaris ("Grand Pensionary", i.e. president of the republic) to strengthen the executive branch. In 1806 Napoleon forced Schimmelpenninck to resign and declared his brother Louis Bonaparte king of the new Kingdom of Holland.

The only signs of political instability were three coups d'état. The first occurred in 1798, when the unitarian democrats were annoyed by the slow pace of democratic reforms. A few months later a second coup put an end to the dictatorship of the unitarians. The National Assembly, which had been convened in 1796, was divided by a struggle among the factions. The third coup occurred in 1801, when a French commander, backed by Napoleon, staged a conservative coup reversing the changes made after the 1798 coup. The Batavian government was more popular among the Dutch population than was the prince of Orange. This was apparent during the British-Russian invasion of 1799.

As a French vassal state, the Batavian Republic was an ally of France in its wars against Great Britain. This led to the loss of most of the Dutch colonial empire and a defeat of the Dutch fleet in the Battle of Camperdown (Camperduin) in 1797. The collapse of Dutch trade caused a series of economic crises. Only in the second half of the 19th century would Dutch wealth be restored to its previous level.

==== Occupation of the Netherlands/French Revolutionary campaign of 1795 ====
The French Revolutionary Wars continued from 1794 between France and the First Coalition.

The year opened with French forces in the process of attacking the Netherlands in the middle of winter. The Dutch people were rather indifferent to the French call for revolution, as they had already been a republic for two centuries, nevertheless city after city was occupied by the French. The Dutch fleet was captured, and the stadtholder fled to be replaced by the Batavian Republic, and, as a vassal state of France, supported the French cause and signed the treaty of Paris, ceding the territories of Brabant and Maastricht to France on May 16.

With the Netherlands falling, Prussia also decided to leave the coalition, signing the Peace of Basle on April 6, ceding the left bank of the Rhine to France. This freed Prussia to finish the occupation of Poland.

=== The Kingdom of Holland (1806–1810) ===
The Kingdom of Holland 1806-1810 (Koninkrijk Holland in Dutch, Royaume de Hollande in French) was set up by Napoleon Bonaparte as a puppet kingdom for his third brother, Louis Bonaparte, in order to better control the Kingdom of the Holland. The name of the leading province, Holland, was now taken for the whole country. Louis did not perform to Napoleon's expectations – he tried to serve Dutch interests instead of his brother's – and the kingdom was dissolved in 1810 after which the Netherlands were annexed by France until 1813 when the French were defeated. During Louis' reign an expeditionary force took part in the French campaigns in Germany during the War of the Fourth Coalition and the War of the Fifth Coalition, and a Dutch brigade was involved in the Peninsular War.

=== Anglo-Dutch Java War (1810–1811) ===
The Anglo-Dutch Java War in 1810-1811 was a war between Great Britain and the Netherlands fought entirely on the Island of Java in colonial Indonesia.

The governor-general of the Dutch East Indies, Herman Willem Daendels (1762–1818), fortified the island of Java against possible British attack. In 1810 a strong British East India Company expedition under Gilbert Elliot, first earl of Minto, governor-general of India, conquered the French islands of Bourbon (Réunion) and Mauritius in the Indian Ocean and the Dutch East Indian possessions of Ambon and the Molucca Islands. Afterward it moved against Java, captured the port city of Batavia (Jakarta) in August 1811, and forced the Dutch to surrender at Semarang on September 17, 1811. Java, Palembang (in Sumatra), Macassar (Makasar, Celebes), and Timor were ceded to the British. Appointed lieutenant governor of Java, Thomas Stamford Raffles (1781–1826) ended Dutch administrative methods, liberalized the system of land tenure, and extended trade. In 1816, the British returned Java and other East Indian possessions to the Dutch as part of the accord ending the Napoleonic Wars.

=== Battle of Waterloo ===
The Battle of Waterloo was to involve 73,000 French soldiers; while the Allied army from Britain, Hanover, Brunswick, and the Netherlands and Nassau were about 67,000 men strong. (Of the 26 infantry brigades in Wellington's army, nine were British; of the 12 cavalry brigades, 7 were British. Half of the 29 batteries of guns were Hanoverian or Dutch).

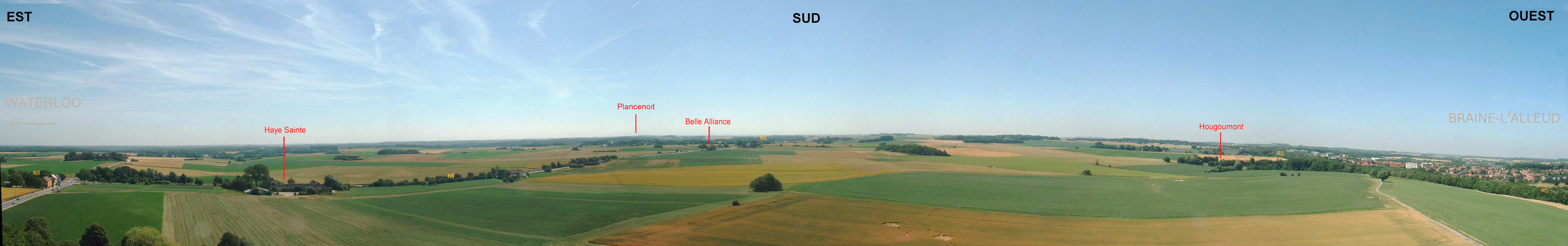
A panorama of the Waterloo battlefield in 2012.

==== The battle ====
At Waterloo, Wellington had the reinforced Hougomont farm, anchoring his right flank, and several other farms on his left. Napoleon faced his first major problem even before the battle began. Unsure of the Prussian Army's position since its flight from Ligny two days previously, Napoleon was all too aware of the need to begin the assault on Wellington's positions. The battle commenced at about 10:00 with an attack upon Hougoumont, but the main attack, with the most feared weapon of the era, the French field artillery, was delayed for hours until the sodden ground from the previous night's downpour had dried out sufficiently to take the weight of the French ordnance. The mud also hindered infantry and cavalry as they trudged into position. When the French artillery eventually opened fire on Wellington's ridge at around 11:35, the expected impact on the Allied troops was diminished by the soft terrain that absorbed the impact of many of the cannonballs.

Map of the battle. French units are in blue, Anglo-Dutch units in red, Prussian in black.

A crucial element of the French plan of battle was the expectation that Wellington would move his reserve to his right flank in defense of Hougomont. At one point, the French succeeded in breaking into the farm's courtyard before being repulsed, but their attacks on the farm were eventually unsuccessful, and Wellington did not need to use his reserve. Hougomont became a battle within a battle and, throughout that day, its defence continued to draw thousands of valuable French troops, under the command of Jérôme Bonaparte, into a fruitless attack while all but a few of Wellington's reserves remained in his centre.

At about 13:30, after receiving news of the Prussian advance to his right, Napoleon ordered Marshal Ney to send d'Erlon's infantry forward against the allied flank near La Haye Sainte. The attack centred on the Dutch 1st Brigade commanded by Major-General Willem Frederik van Bylandt, which was one of the few units placed on the forward slope of the ridge. After suffering an intense artillery bombardment and exchanging volleys with d'Erlon's leading elements for some nine minutes, van Bylandt's outnumbered soldiers were forced to retreat over the ridge and through the lines of General Thomas Picton's division. Picton's division moved forward over the ridgeline to engage d'Erlon. The British and Dutchmen were likewise mauled by volley-fire and close-quarter attacks, but Picton's soldiers stood firm, eventually breaking up the attack by charging the French columns.

Meanwhile, the Prussians began to appear on the field. Napoleon sent his reserve, Lobau's VI corps and 2 cavalry divisions, some 15,000 troops, to hold them back. With this, Napoleon had committed all of his infantry reserves, except the Guard.

Lacking an infantry reserve, as Napoleon was unwilling to commit the Guard at this stage of the battle, all that Ney could do was to try to break Wellington's centre with his cavalry. It struggled up the slope to the fore of Wellington's centre, where squares of Allied infantry awaited them.

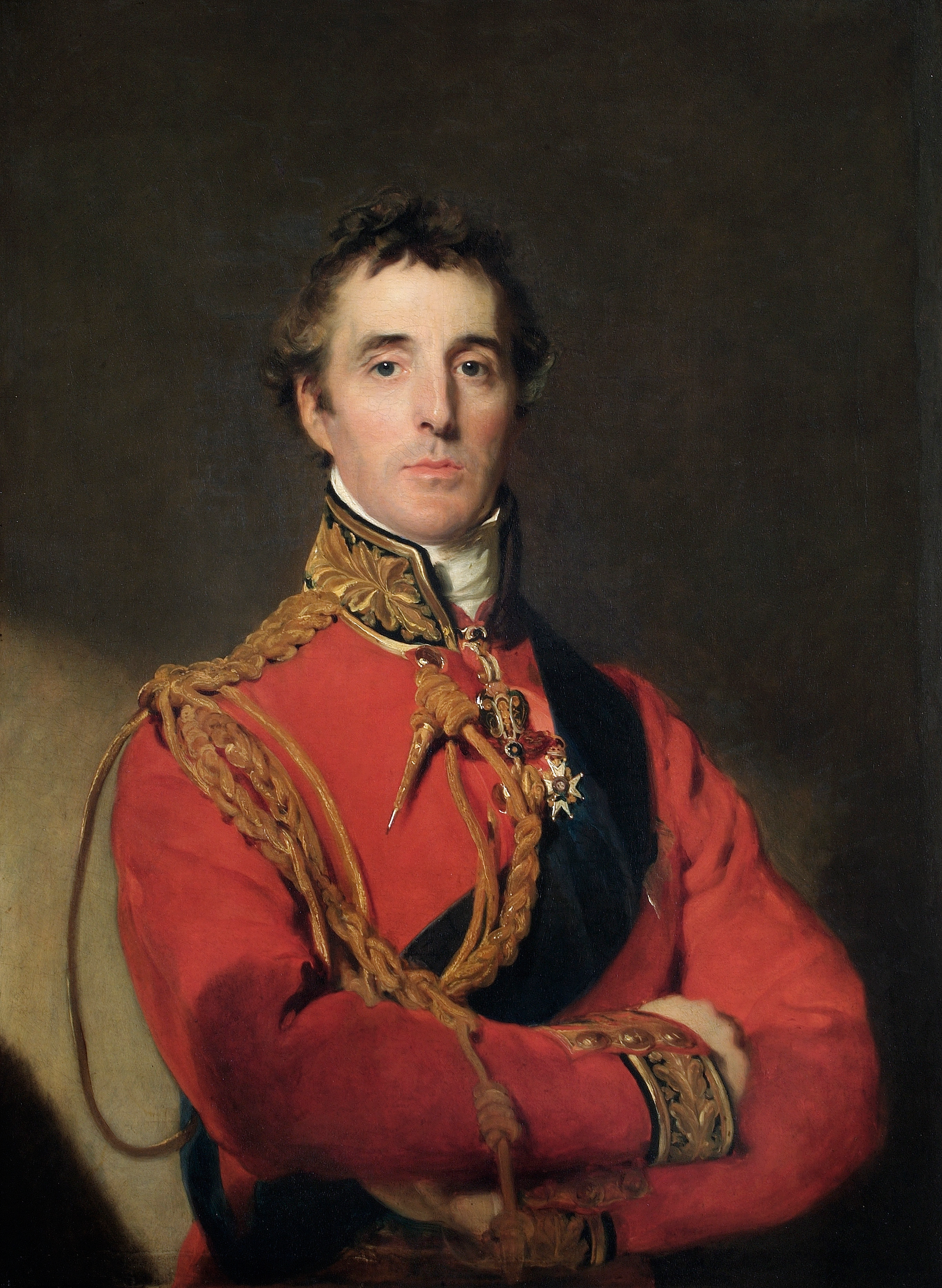
During the Battle of Waterloo, Dutch forces fell under the command of British Field Marshal, Arthur Wellesley.

The cavalry attacks were repeatedly repelled by the solid Allied infantry squares (four ranks deep with fixed bayonets – vulnerable to artillery or infantry, but deadly to cavalry), the harrying fire of British artillery as the French cavalry recoiled down the slopes to regroup, and the decisive counter-charges of the Allied Light Cavalry regiments and the Dutch Heavy Cavalry Brigade. After numerous fruitless attacks on the Allied ridge, the French cavalry was exhausted.

The Prussians were already engaging the Imperial Army's right flank when La Haye Sainte fell to French combined arms (infantry, artillery and cavalry), because the defending King's German Legion had run out of ammunition in the early evening. The Prussians had driven Lobau out of Plancenoit, which was on the extreme (Allied) left of the battle field. Therefore, Napoleon sent his 10 battalion strong Young Guard to beat the Prussians back. But after very hard fighting the Young Guard was beaten back. Napoleon sent 2 battalions of Old Guard and after ferocious fighting they beat the Prussians out. But the Prussians had not been forced away far enough. Approximately 30,000 Prussians attacked Plancenoit again. The place was defended by 20,000 Frenchmen in and around the village. The Old Guard and other supporting troops were able to hold on for about one hour before a massive Prussian counter-attack kicked them out after some bloody street fighting lasting more than a half hour. The last to flee was the Old Guard who defended the church and cemetery. The French casualties at the end of the day were horrible.

With Wellington's centre exposed by the French taking La Haye Sainte, Napoleon committed his last reserve, the undefeated Imperial Guard. After marching through a blizzard of shell and shrapnel, the already outnumbered 5 battalions of Middle Guard defeated the allied first line, including British, Brunswick and Nassau troops.

Meanwhile, to the west, 1,500 British Guards under Maitland were lying down to protect themselves from the French artillery. They rose as one, and devastated the shocked Imperial Guard with volleys of fire at point-blank range. The French chasseurs deployed to answer the fire. After 10 minutes of exchanging musketry the outnumbered French began wavering. This was the sign for a bayonet charge. But then a fresh French chasseur battalion appeared on the scene. The British guard retired with the French in pursuit – though the French in their turn were attacked by fresh British troops of Adam's brigade.

The Imperial Guard fell back in disarray and chaos. A ripple of panic passed through the French lines – "La garde recule. Sauve qui peut!" ("The Guard retreats. Save yourself if you can!"). Wellington, judging that the retreat by the Imperial Guard had unnerved all the French soldiers who saw it, stood up in the stirrups of Copenhagen (his favourite horse), and waved his hat in the air, signalling a general advance. The long-suffering Anglo-Dutch infantry rushed forward from the lines where they had been shelled all day, and threw themselves upon the retreating French.

== Padri War (1821–1837) ==
The Padri War also called Minangkabau War is the name given to the skirmishes fought by the Dutch troops from 1821 to 1837 in West Sumatra, Indonesia.

In the 1820s, the Dutch were yet to consolidate their possessions in some parts of the Dutch East Indies (later Indonesia) after re-acquiring it from the British. At the same time, a conflict broke out in West Sumatra between the so-called adat and padri factions. Although both Minangkabaus and Muslims, they differ in values: the Adats were Minangkabau traditionalists while the Padris were Islamist-Wahhabist. The Padris sought to reform un-Islamic traditions, such as cockfighting and gambling.

== Java War (1825–1830) ==
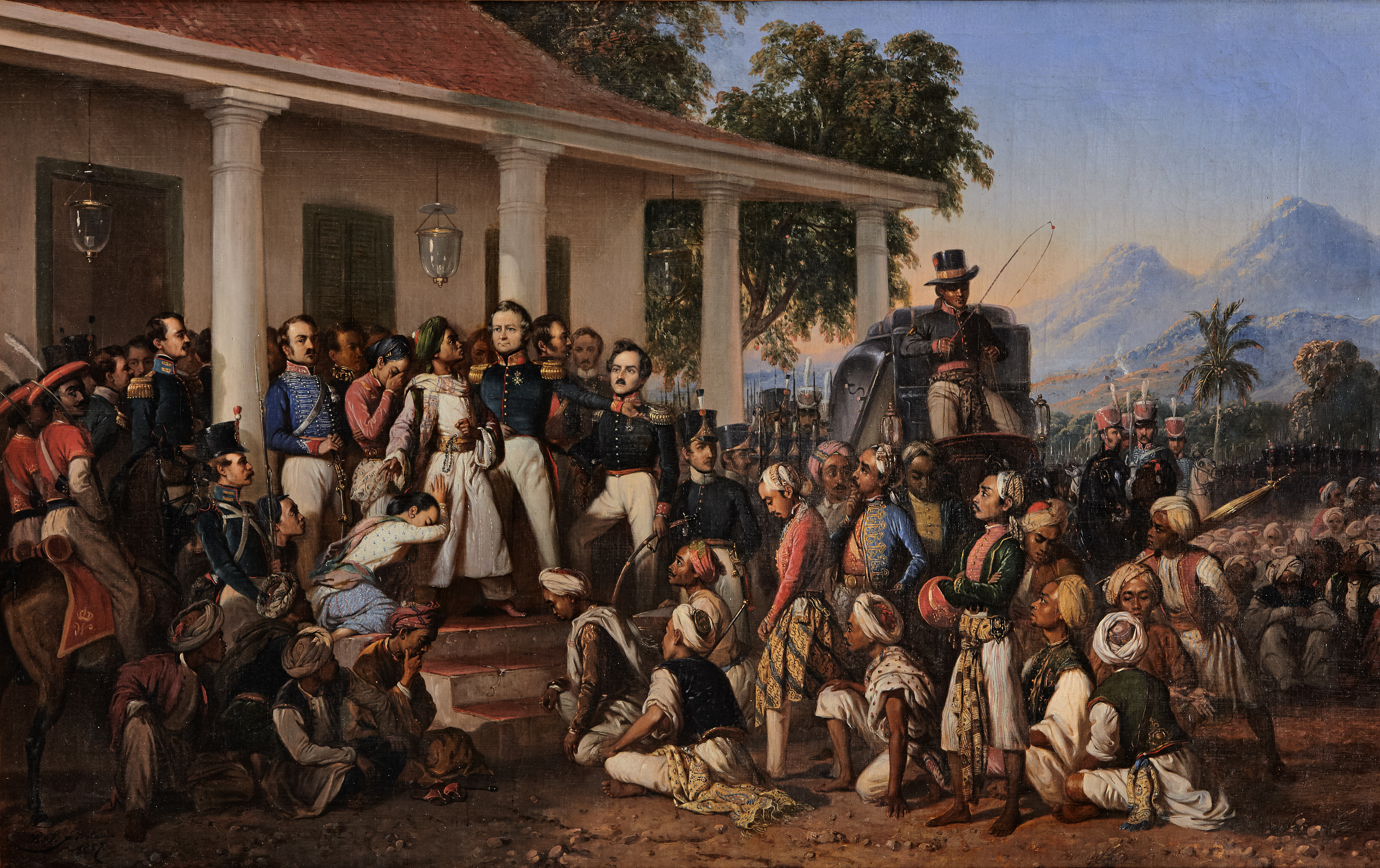
The Arrest of Pangeran Diponegoro by Raden Saleh. Prince Diponegoro led a Javanese revolt against the Dutch colonial authorities during the Java War.

The Java War was fought in Java between 1825 and 1830. It started as a rebellion led by the illustrious Prince Diponegoro. The trigger was the Dutch decision to build a road across a piece of his property that contained his own parent's tomb. Among its causes was a sense of betrayal by the Dutch felt by members of the Javanese aristocratic families, as they were no longer able to rent land at high prices. There were also some problems with the succession of the throne in Yogyakarta: Diponegoro was the oldest son, but as his mother was not the queen, he did not have any right to succeed his father.

The troops of Prince Diponegoro were very successful in the beginning, controlling the middle of Java and besieging Yogyakarta. Furthermore, the Javanese population was supportive of Prince Diponegoro's cause, whereas the Dutch colonial authorities were initially very indecisive.

However, as the Java war prolonged, Prince Diponegoro had difficulties in maintaining the numbers of his troops.

The Dutch colonial army however was able to fill its ranks with troops from Sulawesi and later on with troops from the Netherlands. The Dutch commander, general De Cock, was able to end the siege of Yogyakarta on September 25, 1825.

Prince Diponegoro started a fierce guerrilla war and it was not until 1827 that the Dutch army gained the upper hand.

It is estimated that 200,000 died over the course of the conflict, 8,000 being Dutch. The rebellion finally ended in 1830, after Prince Diponegoro was tricked into entering Dutch custody near Magelang, believing he was there for negotiations for a possible cease-fire, and exiled to Manado on the island of Sulawesi.

== Belgian revolution (1830–1839) ==
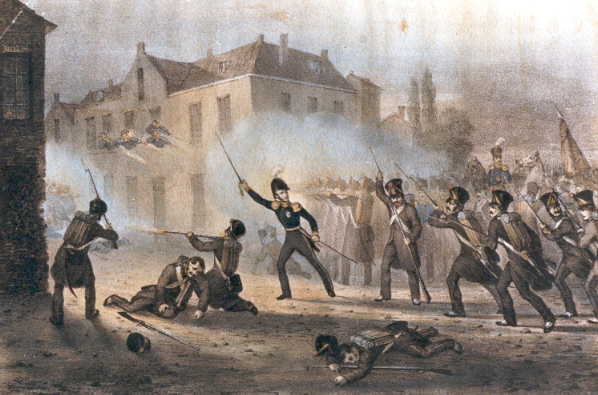
The Prince of Orange leading the Dutch army in an engagement during the Belgian Revolution.

The Belgian Revolution was a conflict in the United Kingdom of the Netherlands that began with a riot in Brussels in August 1830 and eventually led to the establishment of an independent, Catholic and neutral Belgium (William I, king of the Netherlands, would refuse to recognize a Belgian state until 1839, when he had to yield under pressure by the Treaty of London).

August 2 to August 12, 1831, the Dutch army, headed by the Dutch princes, invaded Belgium, in the so-called "Ten Days' Campaign", and defeated Belgian forces near Hasselt and Leuven. Only the appearance of a French army under Marshal Gérard caused the Dutch to retreat. The victorious initial campaign gave the Dutch an advantageous position in subsequent negotiations. William stubbornly pursued the war, bungled, ineffectual and expensive as its desultory campaigns were, until 1839.

== Aceh War (1873–1903) ==
The Dutch colonial government declared war on Aceh on March 26, 1873; the apparent immediate trigger for their invasion was discussions between representatives of Aceh and the United States in Singapore during early 1873. An expedition under Major General Köhler was sent out in 1874, which was able to occupy most of the coastal areas. It was the intention of the Dutch to attack and take the Sultan's palace, which would also lead to the occupation of the entire country. The Sultan requested and possibly received military aid from Italy and the United Kingdom in Singapore: in any case the Aceh army was rapidly modernized, and Aceh soldiers managed to kill Köhler (a monument of this achievement has been built inside Grand Mosque of Banda Aceh). Köhler made some grave tactical errors and the reputation of the Dutch was severely harmed.

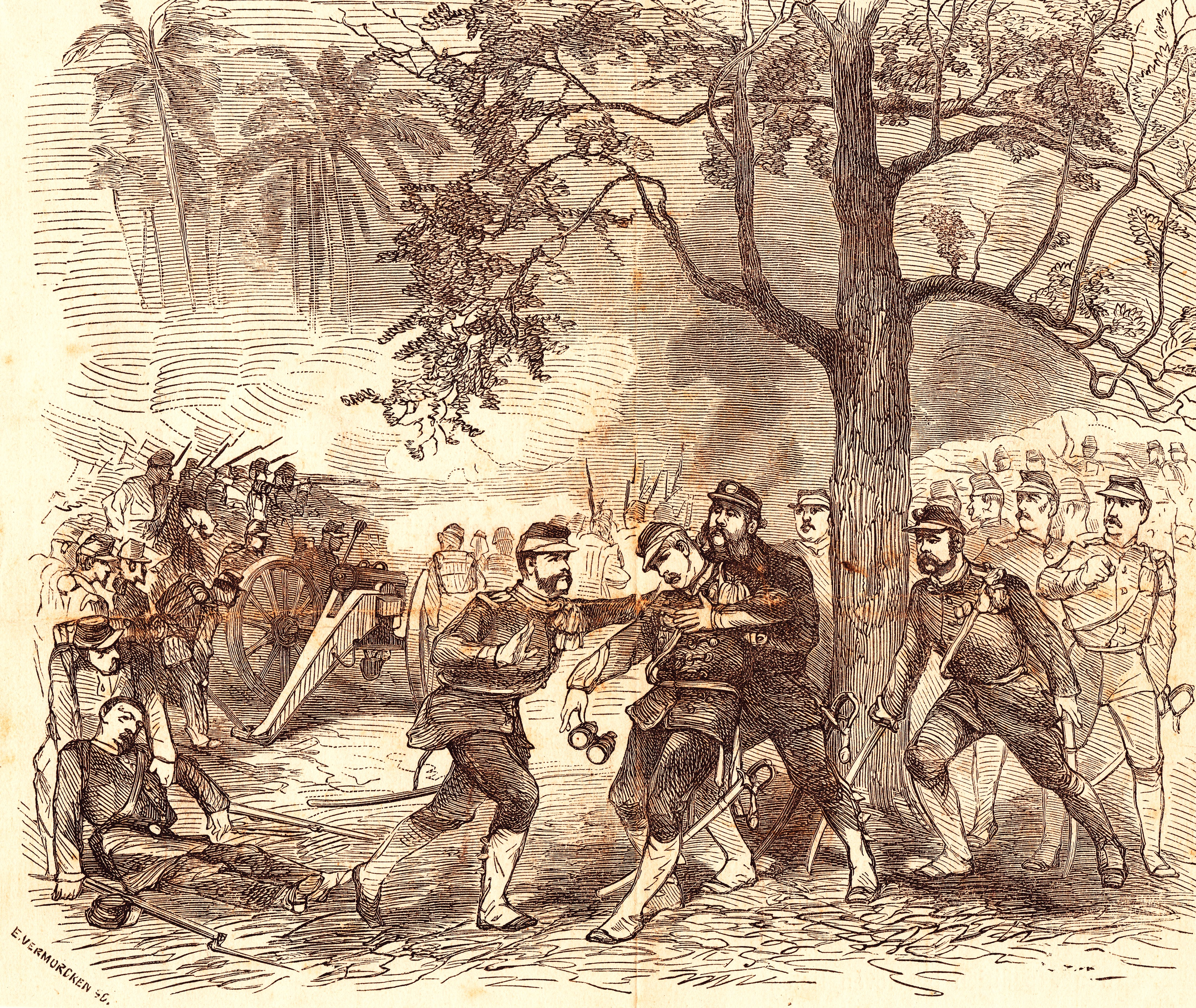
The death of General Johan Harmen Rudolf Köhler during the First Aceh Expedition, a punitive expedition against the Aceh Sultanate, 1873.

A second expedition led by General Van Swieten managed to capture the kraton (sultan's palace): the Sultan had however been warned, and had escaped capture. Intermittent guerrilla warfare continued in the region for ten years, with many victims on both sides. Around 1880 the Dutch strategy changed, and rather than continuing the war, they now concentrated on defending areas they already controlled, which were mostly limited to the capital city (modern Banda Aceh), and the harbour town of Ulee Lheue. On October 13, 1880, the colonial government declared the war as over, but continued spending heavily to maintain control over the areas it occupied.

War began again in 1883, when the British ship Nisero was stranded in Aceh, in an area where the Dutch had little influence. A local leader asked for ransom from both the Dutch and the British, and under British pressure the Dutch were forced to attempt to liberate the sailors. After a failed Dutch attempt to rescue the hostages, where the local leader Teuku Umar was asked for help but he refused, the Dutch together with the British invaded the territory. The Sultan gave up the hostages, and received a large amount in cash in exchange.

The Dutch Minister of Warfare Weitzel now again declared open war on Aceh, and warfare continued, with little success, as before. The Dutch now also tried to enlist local leaders: the aforementioned Umar was bought with cash, opium, and weapons. Umar received the title panglima prang besar (upper warlord of the government).

Umar called himself rather Teuku Djohan Pahlawan (Johan the heroic). On January 1, 1894, Umar even received Dutch aid to build an army. However, two years later Umar attacked the Dutch with his new army, rather than aiding the Dutch in subjugating inner Aceh. This is recorded in Dutch history as "Het verraad van Teukoe Oemar" (the treason of Teuku Umar).

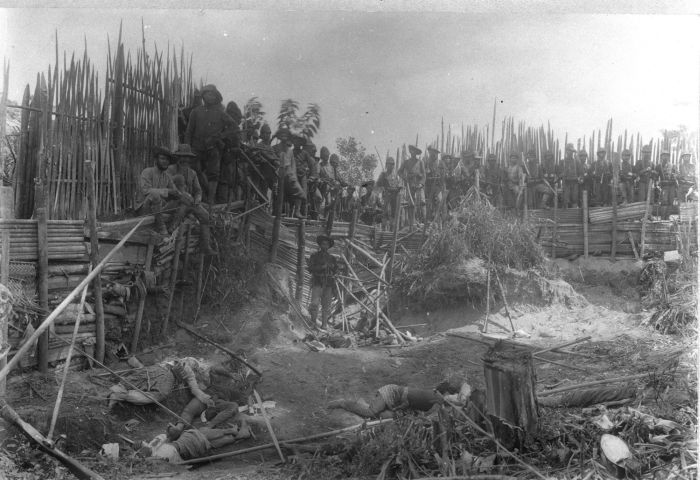
Photograph of the captured Fort Kuto Reh on 14 June 1904.

In 1892 and 1893, Aceh remained independent, despite the Dutch efforts. Major J.B. van Heutsz, a colonial military leader, then wrote a series of articles on Aceh. He was supported by Dr Snouck Hurgronje of the University of Leiden, then the leading Dutch expert on Islam. Hurgronje managed to get the confidence of many Aceh leaders and gathered valuable intelligence for the Dutch government. His works remained an official secret for many years. In Hurgronje's analysis of Acehnese society, he minimised the role of the Sultan and argued that attention should be paid to the hereditary chiefs, the Ulee Balang, who he felt could be trusted as local administrators. However, he argued, Aceh's religious leaders, the ulema, could not be trusted or persuaded to cooperate, and must be destroyed.

This advice was followed: in 1898 Van Heutsz was proclaimed governor of Aceh, and with his lieutenant, later Dutch Prime Minister Hendrikus Colijn, would finally conquer most of Aceh. They followed Hurgronje's suggestions, finding cooperative uleebelang that would support them in the countryside. Van Heutsz charged Colonel Van Daalen with breaking remaining resistance. Van Daalen destroyed several villages, killing at least 2,900 Acehnese, among which were 1,150 women and children. Dutch losses numbered just 26, and Van Daalen was replaced by Colonel Swart. By 1904 most of Aceh was under Dutch control, and had an indigenous government that cooperated with the colonial state. Estimated total casualties on the Aceh side range from 50,000 to 100,000 dead, and over a million wounded.

== World War I (1914–1918) ==
During World War I the Netherlands remained neutral. A large army was mobilised to defend this neutrality, but it was not equipped by the new standards of the day, causing a structural equipment inferiority that would last until the middle of the century. After the war most of the defence budget was spent on the fleet to protect the East Indies. This however didn't allow the navy to be expanded, merely to be modernised.

== World War II (1939–1945) ==
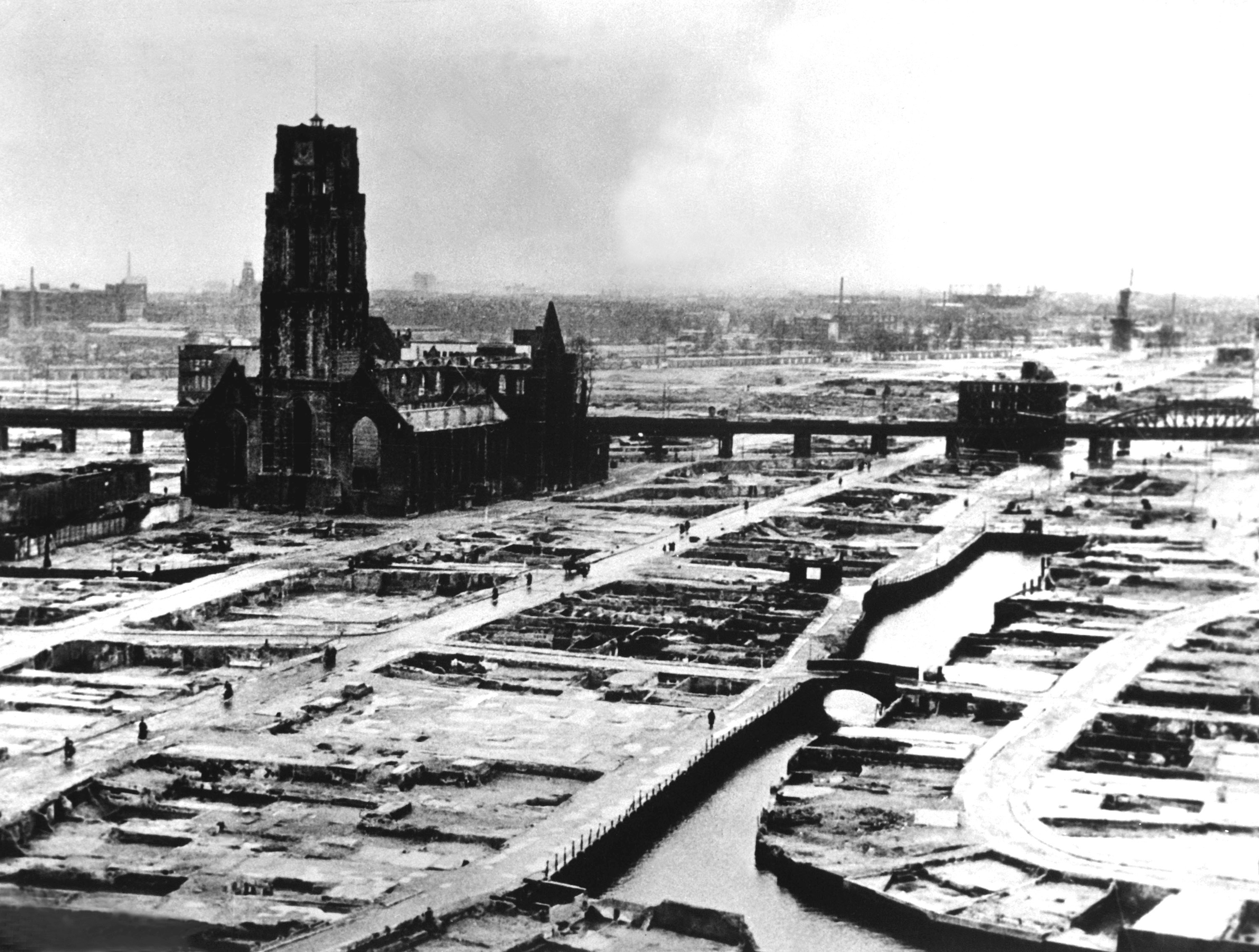
Rotterdam's city centre following the Rotterdam blitz. The aerial bombardment killed nearly 900 people and made 85,000 others homeless.

Whereas it often said of the allies, with much exaggeration, that they during the Battle of France were more prepared for the previous than the present war, for the Dutch not even that was true. Of all the major participants they were by far the most poorly equipped, not even attaining World War I standards, largely due to the Dutch belief that their neutrality would (again) be respected. However, the German invaders in May 1940 adjusted their forces accordingly, and the Dutch army in the Battle of the Netherlands was largely intact when it surrendered on May 14 — after just five days of fighting — to save the major Dutch cities from further bombardment.

The Dutch empire continued the fight, but the Netherlands East Indies (later Indonesia) was invaded by Japan in 1942. In the climactic Battle of the Java Sea, the larger part of the Dutch navy was destroyed. The Dutch contribution to the war effort was then limited to the merchant fleet (providing the bulk of allied merchant shipping in the Pacific war), several aircraft squadrons, some naval vessels and a motorised infantry brigade raised by enlisting Dutch emigrants.

== Cold War ==
After the Second World War, the Dutch were first involved in a colonial war against the nationalists in Indonesia. As a result, the home forces were much neglected and had to rearm by begging for (or simply taking) surplus allied equipment, such as the RAM tank. In 1949 Bernard Montgomery judged the Royal Netherlands Army as simply "unfit for battle".

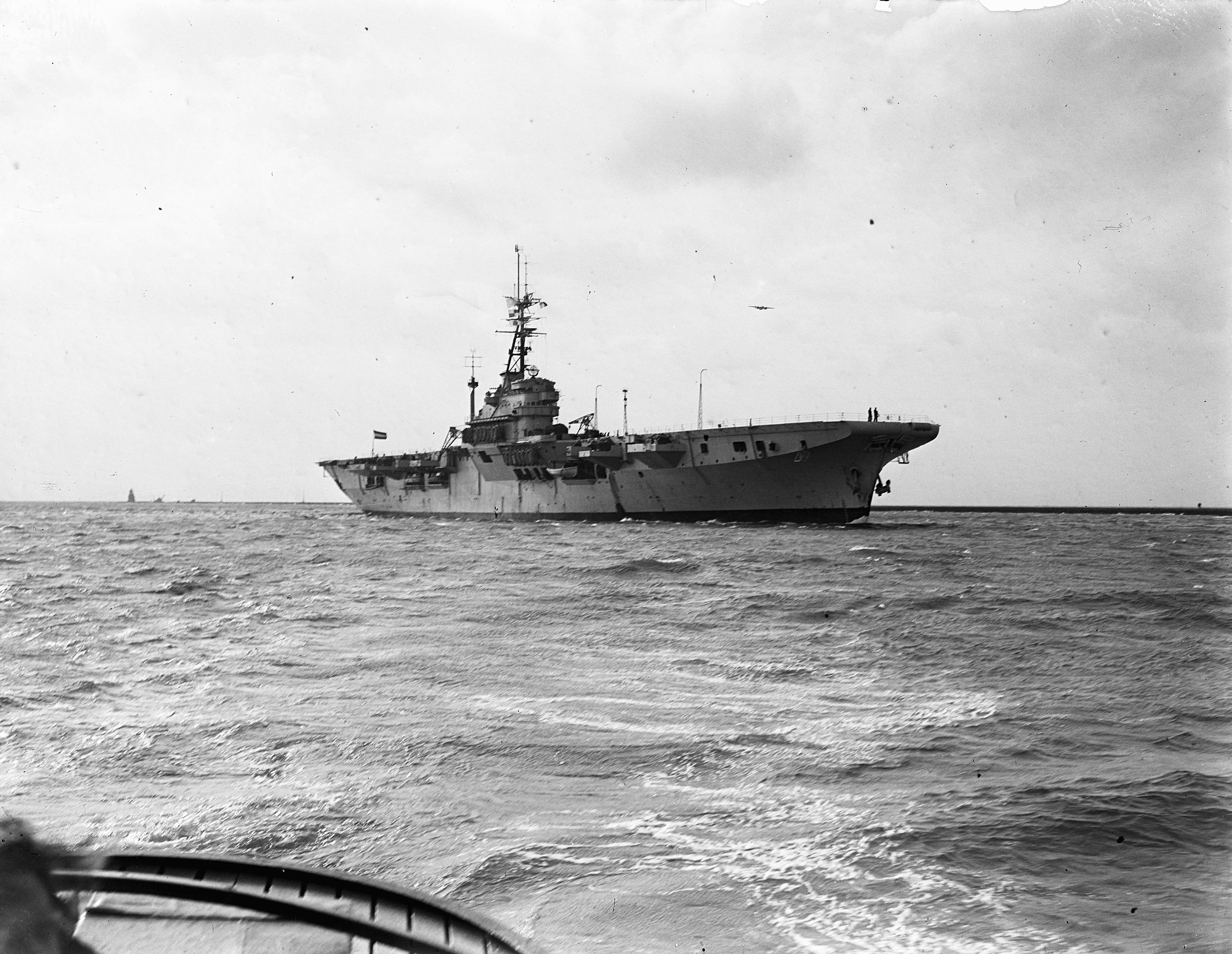
The Royal Netherlands Navy acquired the aircraft carrier HNLMS Karel Doorman in 1948. Its acquisition was a part of a larger military build-up by NATO forces.

In the early fifties however, the Dutch fully participated in the NATO build-up of conventional forces. US financial support paying half of the equipment budget made it possible to create a modern defence force. Afraid that the USA might give up Europe immediately after a Soviet attack, the Dutch strongly reinforced the Rhine position by means of the traditional Dutch defensive weapon: water. Preparations were made to completely dam the major Rhine effluent rivers, forcing the water into the northern IJssel branch and thereby creating an impassable mudbarrier between Lake IJssel and the Ruhr Area. The Dutch navy was also expanded with an aircraft carrier, two cruisers, twelve destroyers and eight submarines.

In the sixties, the Navy again began to produce modern vessels of its own design and expanded slowly, however nuclear propulsion was refused by the United States. The Army replaced most of its motorised units by mechanised ones, introducing thousands of AFVs into the Infantry and the Artillery. Conventional firepower was neglected however as it was intended to engage in nuclear war immediately.

In the seventies, it was hoped that the strategy of flexible response would allow for a purely conventional defence. Digital modelling by the Netherlands Organisation for Applied Scientific Research showed that successful conventional defence was feasible and indeed likely, provided that conventional firepower would be improved. Whereas the British, French, Belgians and Canadians reduced their forces in this decade, the Dutch government therefore decided to go along with the German and American policy of force enlargement. As a result, in the mid-eighties the Dutch heavy units equalled the British in number and the Dutch Corps sector at the Elbe was the only one to have its own reserve division; it was conceived as to be able to hold an attack by nine reinforced Soviet divisions, or about 10,000 AFVs including materiel reserves. These facts were obscured somewhat by international press attention to the relaxation of discipline, part of a deliberate policy to better integrate the forces into the larger society. At the same time the Navy had over thirty capital vessels and the Air Force about 200 tactical planes.

When the Warsaw Pact and the Soviet Union itself collapsed, the Dutch reduced their forces considerably and integrated their army with the German while also creating a new airborne brigade. The conscript army was replaced by a fully professional one and hundreds of light AFVs bought for use in peace missions. Modernising of naval and air forces, less drastically reduced, continues.

=== Korean War ===
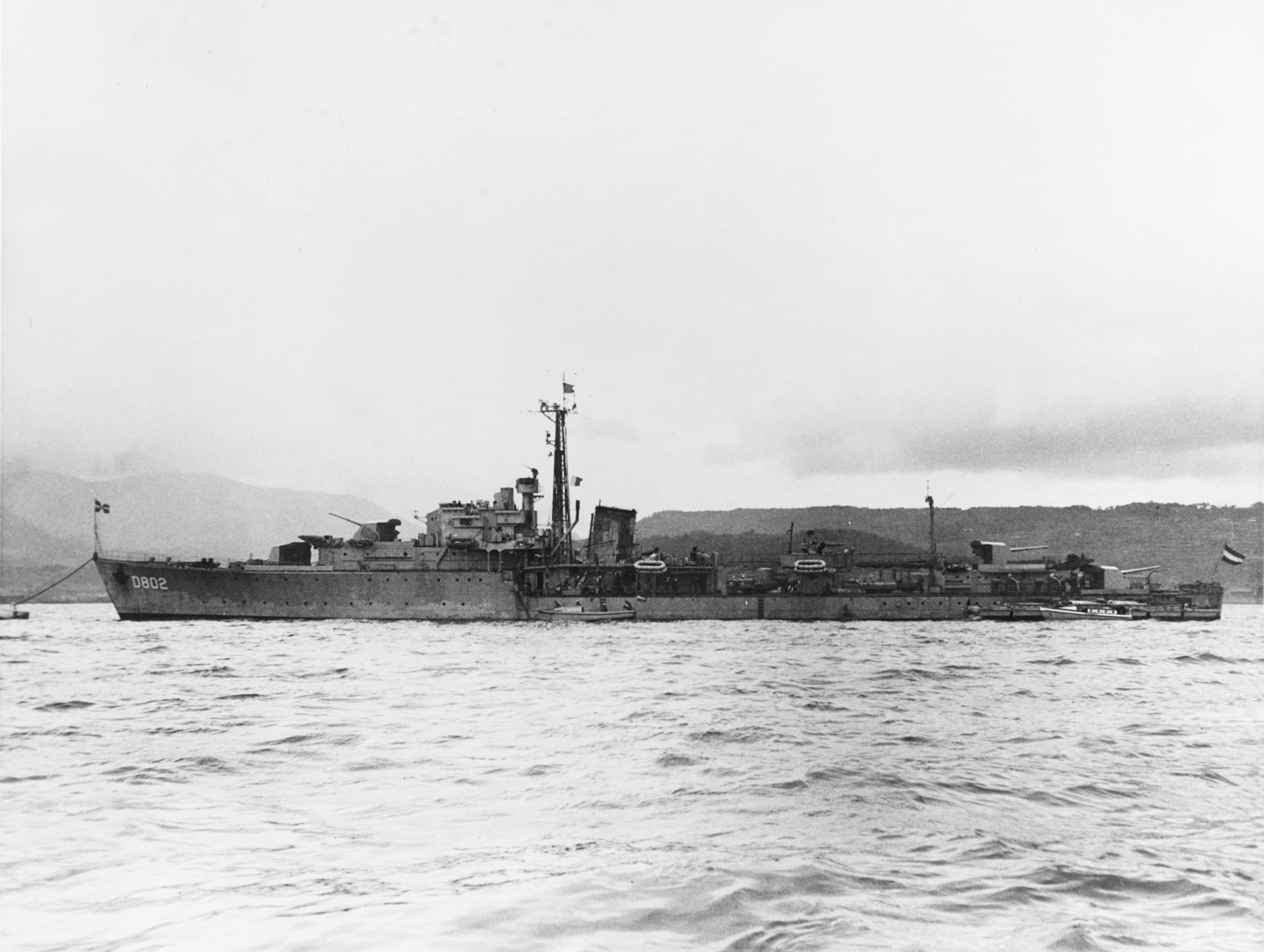
HNLMS Evertsen at Yokosuka, Japan, after joining the United Nations Blockading and Escort Force for the Korean War, in 1951.

The Korean War, from June 25, 1950, until the Korean Armistice Agreement took effect on July 27, 1953, started as a war between North Korea and South Korea. When it began, North and South Korea existed as provisional governments competing for control over the Korean peninsula, due to the division of Korea. The war was one of the first major armed clashes of the Cold War. The principal combatants were North Korea, supported by the People's Republic of China, and later combat advisors, aircraft pilots, and weapons from the Soviet Union; against South Korea, supported principally by the United States, the United Kingdom, Canada, the Philippines and many other nations sent troops under the aegis of the United Nations (UN), including the Netherlands, who sent over 3,000 troops.

The Netherlands Detachment United Nations was established on October 15, 1950, and out of a total number of 16,225 volunteers, 3,418 men were accepted and sent to Korea. Most Dutch army troops were assigned to the "Netherlands Battalion", attached to the 38th Infantry Regiment of the U.S. 2nd Infantry Division. Dutch casualties included 116 men killed in action, 3 missing in action and 1 who died as a prisoner of war. The casualties were eventually buried at the United Nations Memorial Cemetery in Busan, South Korea.

Several vessels of the Royal Netherlands Navy were deployed to Korean waters including the destroyers HNLMS Evertsen, HNLMS Van Galen and HNLMS Piet Hein and the frigates HNLMS Johan Maurits van Nassau, HNLMS Dubois and HNLMS Van Zijll (not all at the same time). Their duties included patrolling Korean waters, escorting other ships and supporting ground troops with naval artillery fire.

== War against Indonesian Independence (1945–1949) ==
After the collapse of Japan at the end of World War II, Indonesian nationalists under Sukarno recognized the opportunity presenting itself and declared independence from Dutch colonial rule. With the assistance of indigenous army units created by the Japanese, an independent Republic of Indonesia with Sukarno as its president was proclaimed on August 17, 1945.

The Netherlands, only very recently freed from German occupation itself, initially lacked the means to respond, allowing Republican forces to establish de facto control over parts of the huge archipelago, particularly in Java and Sumatra. On the other, in the less densely populated outer islands, no effective control was established by either party, leading at times to chaotic conditions.

=== British involvement ===
In the weeks following the Japanese surrender, the United Kingdom sent in troops to take over from the Japanese and soon found itself in conflict with the fledgling government. British forces brought in a small Dutch military contingent which it termed the Netherlands Indies Civil Administration (NICA). The British were worried about the increasing boldness and apparent strength of the Indonesian nationalists, who seemed to be armed with the weapons of defeated Japanese garrisons across the archipelago. A British Brigadier, A.W.S Mallaby, was killed as he pushed for an ultimatum stipulating that the Indonesians surrender their weapons or face a major assault. In retaliation, 10 November 1945, Surabaya was attacked by British forces, leading to a bloody street-to-street battle.

Lasting three weeks, the battle of Surabaya was the bloodiest single engagement in the war and demonstrated the determination of the Indonesian nationalist forces. It made the British reluctant to be drawn into another when their resources in southeast Asia were stretched following the Japanese surrender.

=== Dutch reaction ===
As a consequence, the Dutch were asked to take back control, and the number of NICA forces soon increased dramatically. Initially the Netherlands negotiated with the Republic and came to an agreement at Linggadjati, in which the 'United States of Indonesia' were proclaimed, a semi-autonomous federal state keeping as its head the Queen of the Netherlands.

Both sides increasingly accused each other of violating the agreement, and as consequence the hawkish forces soon won out on both sides. A major point of concern for the Dutch side was the fate of members of the Dutch minority in Indonesia, most of whom had been held under deplorable conditions in concentration camps by the Japanese. The Indonesians were accused (and guilty) of not cooperating in liberating these prisoners.

=== Police actions and guerilla war ===
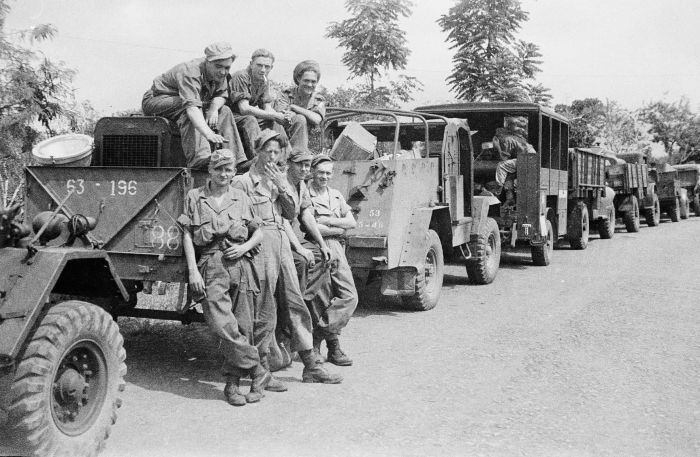
A Dutch military column during the first Dutch military offensive of the Indonesian National Revolution.

The Netherlands government then mounted a large military force to regain what it believed was rightfully its territory. The two major military campaigns that followed were declared as mere 'police actions' to downplay the extent of the operations. There were atrocities and violations of human rights in many forms by both sides in the conflict. Some 6,000 Dutch and 150,000 Indonesians are estimated to have been killed.

Although the Dutch and their indigenous allies managed to defeat the Republican Army in almost all major engagements and during the second campaign even to arrest Sukarno himself, Indonesian forces continued to wage a major guerrilla war under the leadership of General Sudirman who had escaped the Dutch onslaught.

A few months before the second Dutch offensive, communist elements within the independence movement had staged a failed coup, known as Madiun Affair, with the goal of seizing control of the republican forces.

=== Recognition of Indonesian independence ===
The continuing existence of Republican resistance following the second 'Police action', paired with active diplomacy, soon thereafter led to the end of colonial rule. Journalistic opinion in much of the rest of the world, notably in the United States, was against the Dutch. In January 1949, the US government suspended Marshall Plan aid to the Netherlands Indies. Although the threat to Marshall Plan aid to the Netherlands was only implicit, the possibility of the threat to American funds vital to Dutch economic recovery after the Second World War, was one of the reasons why the Netherlands government resumed negotiations.

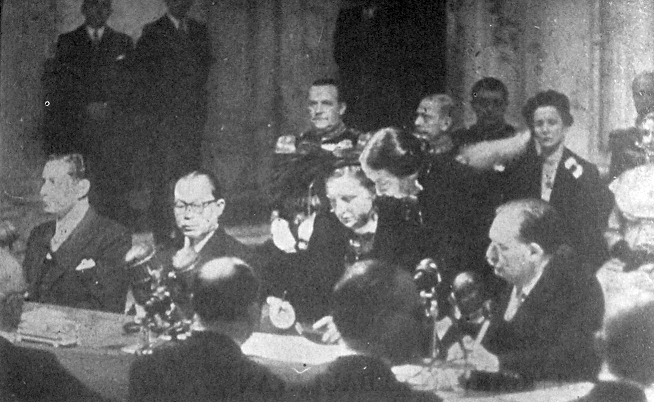
Indonesian Vice-president Mohammad Hatta and Dutch Queen Juliana at the signing ceremony recognizing Indonesian independence.

Following the Round Table conference in The Hague, the Dutch finally recognised Indonesian independence on December 27, 1949. An exception was made for Netherlands New Guinea (currently known as West Irian Jaya), which remained under Dutch control. In 1962, in an attempt to increase pressure on the Dutch, Indonesia launched a campaign of infiltration by commandos coming in by sea and air, which were all beaten back by the Dutch forces, although these were not serious invasions. After large pressure from mainly the United States (again about the Marshall Plan) the Dutch finally gave custody over New Guinea to the UN, which in 1963 gave New Guinea to Indonesia.

In the following decades, a diplomatic row between the governments of Indonesia and the Netherlands persisted over the officially recognized date of Indonesian independence. Indonesians commemorate the anniversary of Sukarno's proclamation (August 17, 1945) as their official holiday.

The Netherlands, having taken in a number of loyalist exiles who (for various reasons) viewed Sukarno's government as illegitimate, would only recognize the date of the final Dutch capitulation to Indonesia on December 27, 1949. This changed in 2005 when the Dutch Foreign Minister, Bernard Bot, made several well-publicized goodwill gestures: officially accepting Indonesian independence as beginning on August 17, 1945; expressing regret for suffering caused by the fighting during the war; and attending the 60th anniversary commemoration of Sukarno's independence proclamation, part of the first Dutch delegation to do so.

== Contemporary wars ==
=== Bosnian War ===
The war in Bosnia and Herzegovina was an armed conflict that took place between March 1992 and November 1995. The war involved several ethnically defined factions within Bosnia and Herzegovina, each of which claimed to represent one of the country's constitutive peoples.

The United Nations Protection Force (UNPROFOR) was the primary UN peacekeeping force in Croatia and in Bosnia and Herzegovina during the Yugoslav Wars. They served between February 1992 and March 1995. The Dutch Army contribution was known as ‘Dutchbat’. UNPROFOR was replaced by a NATO-led multinational force, IFOR in December 1995.

The Royal Netherlands Air Force deployed 12 F-16s as part of Operation Deny Flight, NATO's enforcement of the Bosnian no-fly zone between April 1993 and December 1995 . The Royal Netherlands Air Force also deployed 18 F-16s as part of Operation Deliberate Force, a NATO air campaign conducted to undermine the military capability of Bosnian Serbs who threatened or attacked UN-designated "safe areas" in Bosnia .

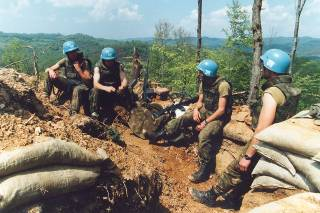
The Dutch contingent of the UNPROFOR, Dutchbat, found itself mired in controversy during the Srebrenica massacre, with their failure to prevent the town's capture, and the subsequent massacre.

One of the most controversial chapters of the Bosnian war and the Netherlands's involvement in the conflict was the Srebrenica massacre that took place in July 1995, where at least 7,000 Muslim men and boys were murdered after the town of Srebrenica fell to Bosnian Serb forces.

Srebrenica was supposed to be a UN-designated safe area, and Dutch troops under the command of Colonel Thom Karremans were tasked to protect Srebrenica's safe haven status. From the outset, both parties to the conflict violated the 'safe area' agreement. Dutchbat troops had arrived in January 1995 and watched the situation deteriorate rapidly in the months after their arrival. The already meagre resources of the civilian population dwindled further and even the UN forces started running dangerously low on food, medicine, fuel and ammunition. Eventually, the UN peacekeepers had so little fuel that they were forced to start patrolling the enclave on foot; Dutchbat soldiers who went out of the area on leave were not allowed to return and their number dropped from 600 to 400 men. With only machinegun-equipped, light armor (Dutch parliament refused to deploy tanks), UNHQ's refusal to commit air support when it was needed, a passive, politically motivated Dutch high command and malfunctioning US supplied anti tank weapons (they would kill the operator on launch), the Dutchbat soldiers present could only wait and watch. Bosnian Serb forces soon took over the town and the massacre soon followed. One Dutch soldier was killed by a grenade lobbed from a column of a retreating Bosniak soldiers; he was the only fatal Dutch casualty in Srebrenica.

Thom Karremans, the UN, the Netherlands army and the Dutch government soon came under fierce criticism for their handling of the crisis. In 2002, a report by the Nederlands Instituut voor Oorlogsdocumentatie concluded that the "humanitarian motivation and political ambitions drove the Netherlands to undertake an ill-conceived and virtually impossible peace mission" and that Dutchbat was ill-equipped to carry out such a mission. The report led to the resignation of the Second cabinet of Wim Kok. The report did not satisfy those that believed the Netherlands bore greater responsibility in not preventing the massacre.

=== Kosovo War ===
The Kosovo conflict was between Yugoslavia and the North Atlantic Treaty Organization between March 24 and June 10, 1999, as a result of the breakdown of security and deteriorating human rights situation in Kosovo. The Netherlands contributed several ships and aircraft to the NATO force in the region. On March 26, 1999, a Yugoslav MiG-29 was shot down by a Royal Netherlands Air Force F-16. At its height in 1999, the Netherlands provided 2,000 troops for KFOR, that entered Kosovo to establish and maintain a secure environment.

=== War on terrorism ===
The ‘War on Terrorism’ is a campaign by the United States, supported by several NATO members and other allies, including the Netherlands, with the stated goal of ending international terrorism. The ‘War on Terrorism’ (in its current context) is the name given by the George W. Bush administration to the efforts launched in response to the September 11, 2001 attacks on New York and Washington, D.C. by al-Qaeda.

==== Multinational force in Iraq ====
The Multinational force in Iraq, also known as the 'Coalition' or 'US-led coalition', refers to the nations whose governments have military personnel in Iraq. The first Balkenende cabinet supported the US and the UK in the 2003 invasion of Iraq. An independent contingent of 1,345 troops (including 650 Dutch Marines, CH-47 Chinook helicopters, military police, a logistics team, a commando squad, and a field hospital and Royal Netherlands Air Force AH-64 attack helicopters in support) based in Samawah (Southern Iraq), that started deploying in 2003 after the initial invasion, left Iraq in June 2005. Netherlands lost two soldiers in separate insurgent attacks.

In January 2010, PM Balkenende found himself in dire straits after the publication of the final report of the 10 months inquiry by the Davids Commission.

Willibrord Davids was the chairman of this special committee of inquiry, charged by the Dutch government in 2009 with investigating the decision-making by the Dutch government in 2003 on the political support for the war in Iraq, which was supported then by the Dutch government following intelligence from Britain and the US. This was the first ever independent legal assessment of the invasion decision. The commissioners included the former president of the Hoge Raad (Dutch supreme court), a former judge of the European Court of Justice, and two legal academics. Balkenende had so far resisted calls for a formal parliamentary inquiry into the decision to back the war.

According to the report, the Dutch cabinet had failed to fully inform the Dutch House of Representatives about its support that the military action of the allies against Iraq "had no sound mandate under international law" and that the United Kingdom was instrumental in influencing the Dutch decision to back the war.

It also emerged that the British government had refused to disclose a key document requested by the Dutch panel, a letter to Balkenende from Tony Blair in which was asked for the support. This letter was said to be handed over in a "breach of diplomatic protocol" and on the basis that it was for Balkenende's eyes only.

The letter was not sent as a note verbale as is the normal procedure – instead it was a personal message from Blair to Balkenende, and had to be returned and not stored in the Dutch archives.

The details of the Dutch inquiry's findings and the refusal of the British government to disclose the letter were likely to increase international scrutiny on the Chilcot inquiry.

Balkenende reacted that he had fully informed of the lower house of parliament with regard to support for the invasion and that the repeated refusal by Saddam Hussain to respect UN resolutions and to co-operate with UN weapons inspectors had justified the invasion.

The Partij van de Arbeid (Dutch Labour Party), part of Balkenende's ruling coalition, demanded a new statement from the PM.

==== Afghanistan ====
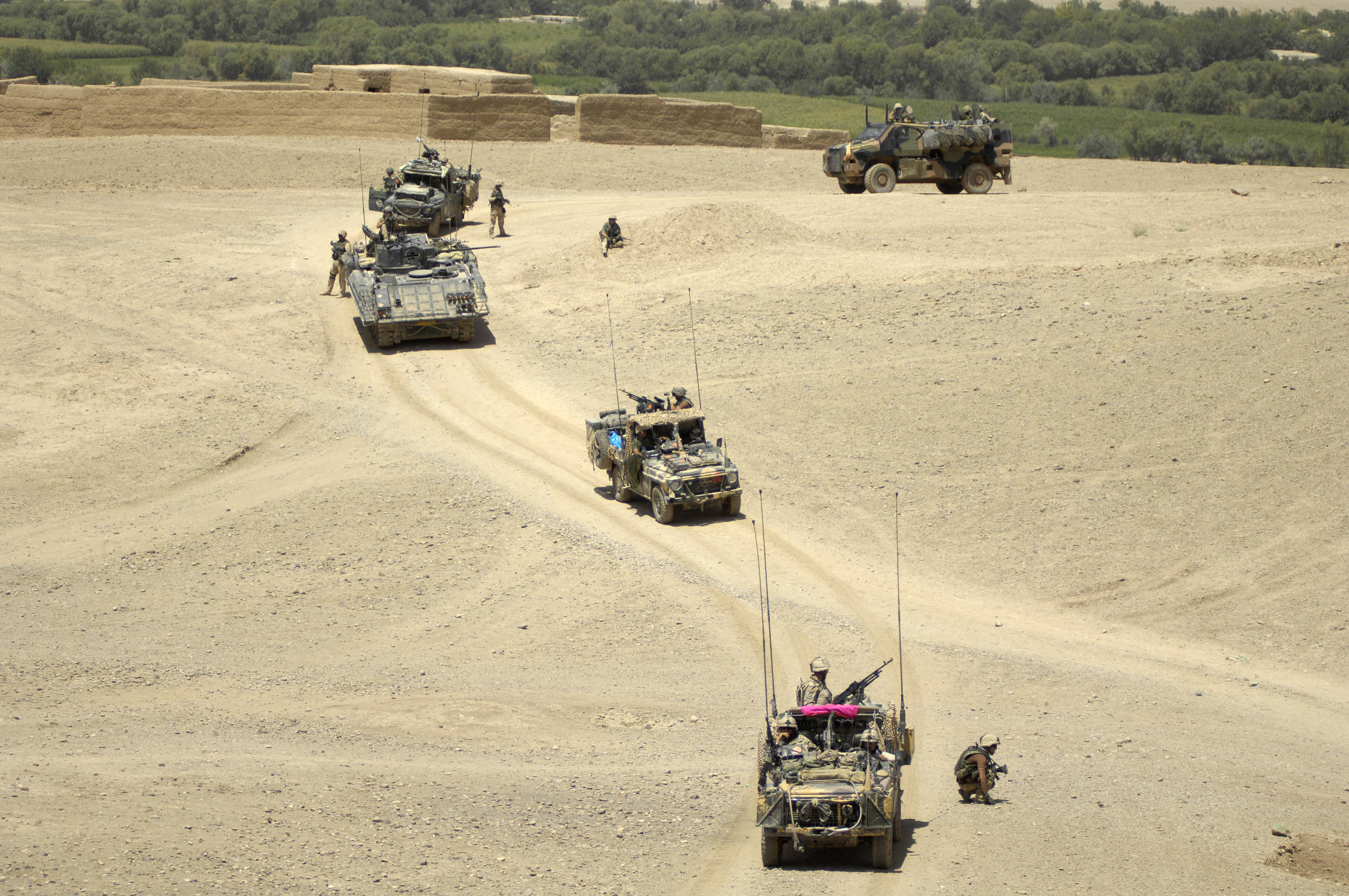
A Dutch patrol in Afghanistan during 2008

As part of Operation Enduring Freedom, the Netherlands deployed aircraft as part of the European Participating Air Force (EPAF) in support of ground operations in Afghanistan as well as Dutch naval frigates to police the waters of the Middle East/Indian Ocean. Starting in 2006, the Netherlands deployed further troops and helicopters to Afghanistan as part of a new security operation in the south of the country. Dutch ground and air forces totalled almost 2,000 personnel during 2006, taking part in combat operations alongside British and Canadian forces as part of NATO's ISAF force in the south. Most of the troops operated in the Uruzgan Province as part of a 3-D strategy (defense, development, diplomacy). On November 1, 2006, Dutch Major-General Ton Van Loon took over NATO Regional Command South in Afghanistan for a six months period from the Canadians. See the Coalition combat operations in Afghanistan in 2006 and Battle of Chora articles for further details. The Royal Netherlands Army Commando Captain Marco Kroon was the first individual recipient of the Military William Order (the highest Dutch award for valour under fire, comparable to the Victoria Cross and the Medal of Honor) since 1955 for actions in Uruzgan, Afghanistan.

Domestically, the participation was unpopular and controversial leading the government in 2007 to announce their withdrawal set for 2010. In response to requests of the American government to continue to stay in Afghanistan in 2009, the Dutch government was reported to explore new missions in Afghanistan, however, this action led to disagreements within the government culminating in its collapse in February 2010. On August 1, 2010, the Dutch military formally declared its withdrawal from its four-year mission in Afghanistan; all 1,950 soldiers are expected to be back in the Netherlands by September.
