= USS Trumpeter (DE-180) =

Cannon-class destroyer escort

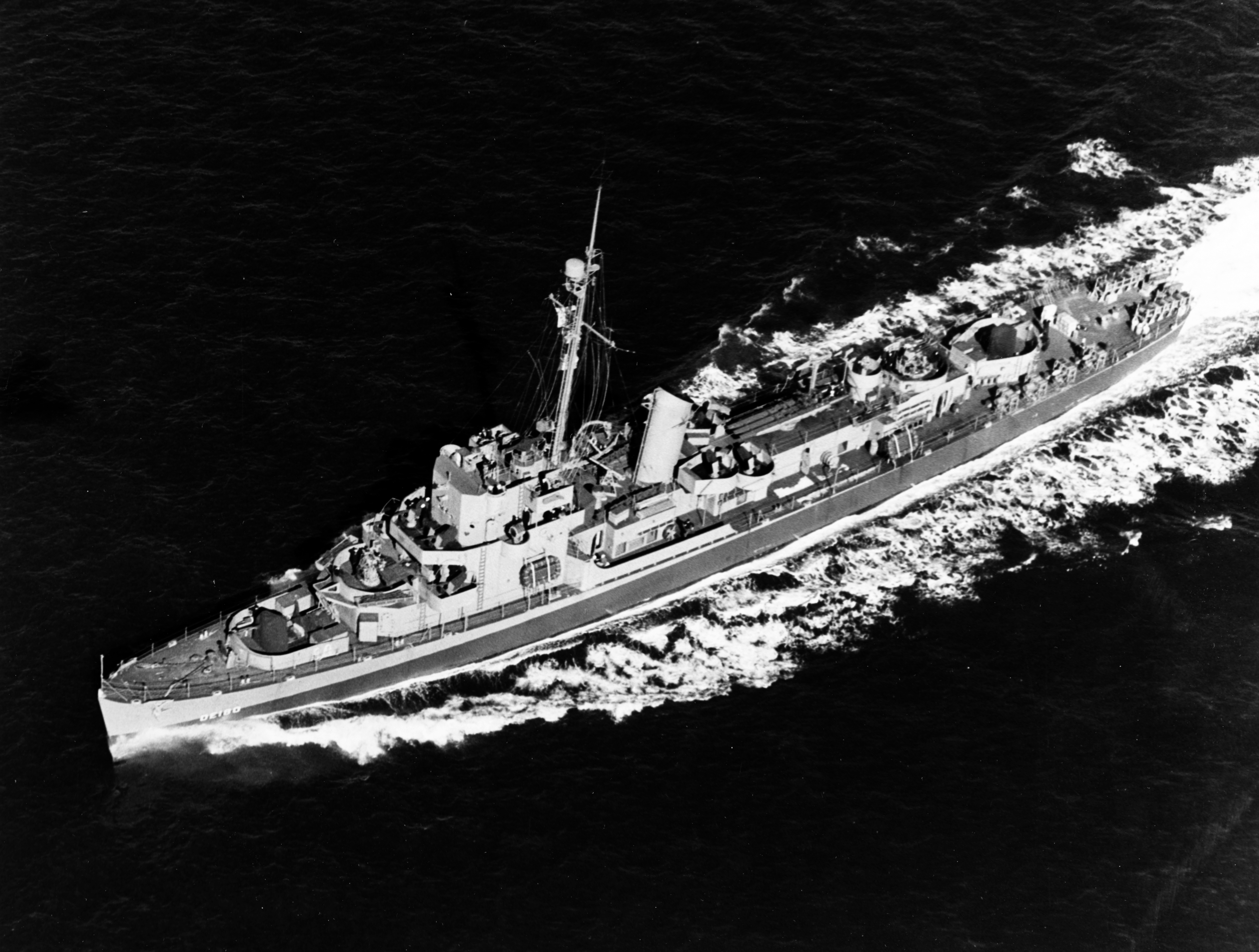

History

United States
- Name: USS Trumpeter
- Namesake: George Nelson Trumpeter
- Builder: Federal Shipbuilding and Drydock Company, Newark, New Jersey
- Laid down: 7 June 1943
- Launched: 19 September 1943
- Commissioned: 16 October 1943
- Decommissioned: 5 December 1947
- Stricken: 1 August 1973
- Fate: Sold for scrapping 18 June 1974

General characteristics
- Class & type: Cannon-class destroyer escort
- Displacement: 1,240 long tons (1,260 t) standard; 1,620 long tons (1,646 t) full
- Length: 306 ft (93 m) o/a; 300 ft (91 m) w/l
- Beam: 36 ft 10 in (11.23 m)
- Draft: 11 ft 8 in (3.56 m)
- Propulsion: 4 × GM Mod. 16-278A diesel engines with electric drive, 6,000 shp (4,474 kW), 2 screws
- Speed: 21 knots (39 km/h; 24 mph)
- Range: 10,800 nmi (20,000 km) at 12 kn (22 km/h; 14 mph)
- Complement: 15 officers and 201 enlisted
- Armament: 3 × single Mk.22 3"/50 caliber guns; 1 × twin 40 mm Mk.1 AA gun; 8 × 20 mm Mk.4 AA guns; 3 × 21-inch (533 mm) torpedo tubes; 1 × Hedgehog Mk.10 anti-submarine mortar (144 rounds); 8 × Mk.6 depth charge projectors; 2 × Mk.9 depth charge tracks

USS Trumpeter (DE-180) was a Cannon-class destroyer escort in service with the United States Navy from 1943 to 1947. She was sold for scrap in 1974.

== History ==
She was named in honor of Navy aviator Lt. (jg.) George Nelson Trumpeter who was killed in action during "Operation Torch" on 8 November 1942. The ship was laid down on 7 June 1943 at Newark, New Jersey, by the Federal Shipbuilding and Drydock Co.; launched on 19 September 1943; sponsored by Mrs. Hazel Vivian Trumpeter, mother of Lt. Trumpeter; and commissioned on 16 October 1943.

=== Battle of the Atlantic ===
While Trumpeter was completing outfitting at New York Navy Yard only three days after her commissioning, sparks from a workman's burner set off a small fire on a line between the dock and the port side of the ship. An alert fire watch at the scene quickly extinguished the fire, and damage to the new destroyer escort was averted. On the 28th, she underwent dock trials and deperming and finished the month with underway trials in New York Harbor.

Early in November, Trumpeter departed New York, setting her course for Bermuda. She moored in Port Royal Bay on the 6th and in the following weeks participated in extensive shakedown and indoctrination exercises. Antisubmarine tactics, convoy escort technique, gunnery, night illumination, cruising and screening exercises occupied her days. Each evening, she returned to Bermuda to anchor in Great Sound. Antisubmarine runs, practice fueling at sea, towing, mail-passing and emergency steering drills readied the new destroyer escort and her crew for the rigors of wartime Atlantic operations.

At last, on 2 December, Trumpeter got underway for New York where she underwent alterations and voyage repairs. On 16 December, she departed New York and set her course northeast. The same day, she moored at Naval Air Station Quonset Point and reported for temporary duty with the Antisubmarine Development Detachment, Atlantic Fleet (ASDEVLANT). There she took part in testing newly developed antisubmarine gear until 17 January when she departed Narragansett Bay for New York. After repairs to one of her main propulsion generators, she resumed her duties at Quonset Point, Rhode Island, remaining there until 13 February when she detached from ASDEVLANT and made way for New York. Following routine upkeep, she got underway with Task Group (TG) 27.2 on the 20th, steaming southward with two escort carriers and two destroyer escorts, bound for Brazil.

Late in the morning on the first day of March, she arrived at Recife, Brazil, reported for duty with the U.S. 4th Fleet; then continued on to arrive at Rio de Janeiro on the 7th. She moored at Bahia, Brazil, on the 17th for 10 days availability and routine upkeep. On the 28th, she got underway with Straub (DE-181) and Gustafson (DE-182); then, on the 31st, she rendezvoused with Solomons (CVE-67) and reported to Commander, Task Group (CTG) 41.6 for her first antisubmarine patrol.

For the next five months, Trumpeter conducted patrols out of Brazilian ports with antisubmarine task groups. The escort carrier hunter-killer group was an innovation in antisubmarine warfare which effectively blunted the efficiency of German submarines in the Atlantic shipping lanes. Each group, composed of one escort carrier and its screen of destroyer escorts or old destroyers, aggressively sought out and destroyed enemy submarines in Atlantic waters with notable success. When Trumpeter began patrols in March 1944, however, German submarine activity was not so extensive as it had been earlier in the war; and many of her patrols were uneventful. In June, while Trumpeter was patrolling in mid-Atlantic with Solomons, a plane from the carrier detected the presence of a German submarine. Planes dispatched from Solomons eventually sank the submarine. While Trumpeter remained behind to screen the carrier, Straub and Herzog (DE-178) set out for the area of the sinking, some 40 miles away, to rescue survivors. The two DE's picked 23 Germans from the waters, but the flier, whose bold low altitude bombing run had finished off the U-boat, was still missing when the search was ended.

Trumpeter's routine of patrol interspersed with periods of repair and upkeep was varied in August with four days of antisubmarine exercises and night battle practice out of Recife. She departed on 1 September and, on the 3rd, joined Memphis (CL-13) and Cannon (DE-99) en route to Rio de Janeiro. During two weeks in that port, she underwent availability and prepared for her first Atlantic crossing. Finally, on 22 September 1944, she departed Brazilian waters escorting transports General M. C. Meigs (AP-116) and General W. A. Mann (AP-112) carrying troops of the Brazilian Expeditionary Force bound for the European theater of war.

On 4 October, she anchored in Gibraltar Bay but, less than six hours later, was again underway for the east coast. Arriving at New York on 13 October, she commenced 30 days of availability and drydocking; then, on 14 November, she set her course for South America, conducting firing practice as she steamed southward. At 1700 on the 23rd, she saw the welcome sight of the Fortaleza, Brazil, harbor blimp, proceeded to that Brazilian port, paused briefly, and then steamed on to arrive at Recife on 25 November. In December, she engaged in gunnery practice and, later in the month, made routine patrols out of Recife with Marblehead (CL-12) and Micka (DE-176). On the 24th, she moored at Bahia, Brazil, and remained there undergoing availability until 2 January when she got underway again for patrol. In the next three months, she continued Atlantic patrols; then, early in March, she escorted Omaha (CL-4) from Recife to Montevideo, Uruguay.

Trumpeter departed Uruguay on 22 March 1945, steamed northward, and arrived at New York on 8 April. Following availability and dry-docking, she took part in antisubmarine exercises in Casco Bay. On 24 April, while patrolling off the New England coast, she struck an underwater object which damaged her sonar gear, making it necessary for her to detach from the task group (TG 22.6) and put in at Norfolk, Virginia, for repairs. She rejoined the task group on the 26th and into May continued antisubmarine patrols. On 8 May, she arrived at New London, Connecticut, to begin antisubmarine warfare exercises. Later in the month, she proceeded to New York where she joined the screen of UGS 94 when it departed the United States on the 22nd. Stopping briefly in the Azores, Trumpeter steamed for Mediterranean ports. The convoy members dispersed to their various destinations on 7 and 8 June, and the destroyer escort continued on to Oran for a short stay before departing the Mediterranean. After refueling at Horta, she steamed on, arrived at Boston, Massachusetts, on 19 June, and began a prolonged period of availability.

=== Pacific War ===
Underway again on 23 July, she set her course for the Caribbean and, on the 27th, arrived at Guantanamo Bay for refresher training in gunnery, antisubmarine warfare, damage control, and shore bombardment. On 10 August, she departed Cuba and steamed, via the Panama Canal Zone, to San Diego, California. Following a period of availability, Trumpeter departed the west coast on the 27th on orders from the 11th Naval District. She arrived at Pearl Harbor on 2 September and alternated exercises with carrier rescue duties until late in October when she began weather station patrols in the North Pacific.

=== Decommissioning and fate ===
She returned to the Hawaiian Islands in December and, on the 18th, got underway for the Panama Canal Zone. She arrived at Boston early in January 1946 and remained in East Coast ports until February when she reported to the U.S. 16th Fleet at Green Cove Springs, Florida, to await inactivation. She was decommissioned on 14 June 1946. Her disposal was deferred pending a possible transfer to a foreign government, but the transaction failed to materialize, and Trumpeter's inactivation was completed in December 1947. Her name was struck from the Navy List on 1 August 1973, and her hulk was authorized for sinking as a target in Atlantic Fleet tests. Instead, however, she was sold for $94,666.66 on 18 June 1974 to the Boston Metals Company of Baltimore, Maryland, for scrapping.
