= Mikheyev =

Mikheyev, Mikheev (Russian: Михеев, Ukrainian: Міхєєв), feminine: Mikheyeva, Mikheeva is a Russian patronymic surname derived from the given name Mikhey (Micah or Micaiah/Micajah). Notable people with the surname include:

- Aleksandr Mikheyev (born 1961), Russian engineer and business executive
- Aleksei Mikheyev (footballer) (born 1998), Russian footballer
- Alexey Mikheyev, of Mikheyev v. Russia, a 2006 European Court of Human Rights case
- Andrei Mikheyev (born 1987), Russian footballer
- Artyom Mikheyev (born 1987), Russian footballer
- Evgenу Ivanovich Mikheyev (born 1942), secular name of Eumenius, a Russian Old Believer bishop
- Galina Malchugina-Mikheyeva or Galina Malchugina, Russian sprinter
- Ilya Mikheyev (born 1994), Russian ice hockey player
- Mikhail Nikolayevich Mikheyev (1905–1989), Soviet physicist
- Oleg Mikheyev, Russian MP and former owner of Volgoprombank
- Stanislav Mikheyev (1940–2011), Russian physicist and co-formulator of the Mikheyev–Smirnov–Wolfenstein effect
- Stanislav Mikheev (born 1989), Russian luger
- Viktor Mikheyev (born 1942), Russian coxswain
- Vitaliy Mikheyev, Ukrainian strongman
- Vladimir Mikheyev (born 1957), Russian swimmer
- Yuliana Mikheeva, Armenian swimmer

== See also ==
- Mikheyevo
