= Micah =

Micah (/ˈmaɪkə/; Hebrew: מִיכָה, Modern: Mikha, Tiberian: Mîḵā) is a given name.

Micah is the name of several people in the Tanakh, and means "Who is like God?”. The name is sometimes found with theophoric extensions. Suffix theophory in Yah and in Yahweh results in Michaiah or Michaihu (Hebrew: מִיכָיְהוּ, Modern: Mikhayhu, Tiberian: Mîḵā́yhû), meaning who is like Yahweh? Suffix theophory in El results in Michael (Hebrew: מִיכָאֵל, Modern: Mikha'el, Tiberian: Mîḵāʼēl), meaning "who is like god".

In German and Dutch, Micah is spelled Micha and the ch in the name is pronounced either [ʃ] or [x]; the first is more common in female names, the latter in male names. In Finnish, Micah is spelled Miika.

== People named Micah ==
- Micah Abernathy (born 1997), American football player
- Micah Abraham (born 2000), American football player
- Micah Aiu (born 1988/1989), American politician
- Micah Aivazoff (born 1969), Canadian ice hockey player
- Micah Albert (born 1979), American photojournalist
- Micah Alberti (born 1984), American actor
- Micah Alejado, American football player
- Micah Altman (born 1967), American social scientist
- Micah Anthony (born 2004), English footballer
- Micah Armstrong, American evangelist
- Micah Ashby (born 1992), American-Irish mixed martial artist
- Micah Lakin Avni (born 1969), Israeli businessman
- Micah Awe (born 1994), Nigerian Canadian football player
- Micah Balfour (born 1978), English actor
- Micah Ballard (born 1975), American poet
- Micah Barlow (1873–1936), English cricketer
- Micah Barnes (born 1960), Canadian singer-songwriter
- Micah Baskerville (born 1999), American football player
- Micah Beckwith (born 1982), American pastor and politician
- Micah Bernard (born 2001), American football player
- Micah Blunt, American basketball player
- Micah Bowie (born 1974), American baseball player
- Micah Boyd (born 1982), American rower
- Micah Brooks (1775–1857), American politician
- Micah Brown (born 1986), Canadian football player
- Micah Burton (born 2006), American soccer player
- Micah Caskey (born 1981), American politician
- Micah Cheserem, Kenyan banker
- Micah Chisholm (born 2004), Canadian soccer player
- Micah Christenson (born 1993), American volleyball player
- Micah Cooks (born 1981), American soccer player
- Micah J. Davis, American football player
- Micah Downs (born 1986), American basketball player
- Micah Evans (born 1993), English footballer
- Micah Fitzerman-Blue, American screenwriter
- Micah Fowler (born 1998), American actor
- Micah Franklin (disambiguation)
- Micah Garen (born 1968), American filmmaker
- Micah Gravley (born 1974), American politician
- Micah Gunnell (born 1980), American comic book artist
- Micah Hamilton (born 2003), English footballer
- Micah Handlogten (born 2003), American basketball player
- Micah Hannemann (born 1994), American football player
- Micah Hart (born 1997), Canadian ice hockey player
- Micah Hauptman (born 1973), American actor
- Micah Hawkins (1777–1825), American poet
- Micah Hilton (born 1985), Montserratian footballer
- Micah P. Hinson (born 1981), American musician
- Micah Hoffpauir (born 1980), American baseball player
- Micah Hudson, American football player
- Micah Hyde (disambiguation)
- Micah Jenkins (1835–1864), American general
- Micah Jesse (born 1986), American blogger
- Micah Jiba (born 1969), Nigerian politician
- Micah Johnson (disambiguation)
- Micah Kellner (born 1979), American politician
- Micah Kiser (born 1995), American football player
- Micah Knorr (born 1975), American football player
- Micah Kogo (born 1986), Kenyan long-distance runner
- Micah Kovacevich (born 1997), Canadian sledge hockey player
- Micah Lancaster (born 1984), American basketball player
- Micah Lasher (born 1981), American politician
- Micah Lawrence (born 1990), American swimmer
- Micah Lea'alafa (born 1991), Solomon Islands footballer
- Micah Joseph Lebensohn (1828–1852), Russian poet
- Micah Lewensohn (1952–2017), Israeli theater director
- Micah Lexier (born 1960), Canadian artist
- Micah Akasile Lolem (born 1967), Ugandan politician
- Micah Kai Lynette (born 2001), Thai figure skater
- Micah Maʻa (born 1997), American volleyball player
- Micha Marah (born 1953), Belgian singer and actress
- Micah Masei (born 1999), Samoan swimmer
- Micah Massey (born 1987), American musician
- Micah Mays Jr. (born 2005), American football player
- Micah Mbick (born 2006), English footballer
- Micah McFadden (born 2000), American football player
- Saint Micah (born 1994), American pianist
- Micah Mensah-Jatoe, Canadian actor
- Micah Morris (born 2003), American football player
- Micah Naftalin (1933–2009), American activist
- Micah Nathan, American novelist
- Micah Neal (born 1974), American politician
- Micah Nelson (born 1990), American singer-songwriter
- Micah Nori (born 1974), American basketball coach
- Micah Obiero (born 2001), English footballer
- Micah Ohlman (born 1972), American journalist
- Micah Ojo (born 2009), American basketball player
- Micah Owings (born 1982), American baseball player
- Micah Parrish (born 2001), American basketball player
- Micah Parsons (born 1999), American football player
- Micah Paulino (born 1992), Guamanian footballer
- Micah Peavy (born 2001), American basketball player
- Micah Pellerin (born 1988), American football player
- Micah Perks (born 1963), American writer
- Micah Potter (born 1998), American basketball player
- Micah Richards (born 1988), English football player
- Micah Robinson (born 2002), American football player
- Micah Ross (born 1976), American football player
- Micah Rucker (born 1985), American football player
- Micah Salt (1847–1915), English tailor
- Micah C. Saufley (1842–1910), American judge
- Micah Schwartzman (born 1976), American law professor
- Micah Shrewsberry (born 1976), American basketball coach
- Micah Sloat (born 1981), American actor
- Micah Smaldone (born 1978), American musician
- Micah W. J. Smith (born 1981), American lawyer
- Micah Solusod (born 1990), American voice actor
- Micah Stampley (born 1971), American singer-songwriter
- Micah Sterling (1784–1844), American politician
- Micah Taul (1785–1850), American politician
- Micah Taul (Alabama politician) (1832–1873), American politician
- Micah Taylor (1977–2024), American professional wrestler
- Micah Teitz (born 1996), Canadian football player
- Micah Townsend (1749–1832), American political leader
- Micah True (1953–2012), American runner
- Micah Tyler (born 1983), American singer
- Micah M. White (born 1982), American activist
- Micah Wilkinson (born 1996), New Zealand sailor
- Micah Williams (disambiguation)
- Micah Wright (born 1974), American author
- Micah Zandee-Hart (born 1997), Canadian ice hockey player
- Micah Zenko, American political scientist

== Fictional characters ==
- Micah Clarke, a character in the novel Micah Clarke
- Micah Rains, a character in the comic series Wonder Woman
- Micah Sanders, a character in the television series Heroes
- Micah Bell lll, the main antagonist of the video game Red Dead Redemption 2
- King Micah, a character in the television series She-Ra: Princess of Power

== Surname ==
- Ben Micah (died 2022), Papua New Guinean politician
- Duke Micah (born 1991), Ghanaian boxer
- Teagan Micah (born 1997), Australian footballer

== See also ==
- Michael (disambiguation)
- Micah (disambiguation)
- Myka (disambiguation)
