= Micka =

Micka is a Czech surname. Notable people with the surname include:

- Daniel Micka (born 1963), Czech writer and translator from English
- Edward Micka (1915–1942), officer of United States Navy, a Navy pilot, recipient of the Navy Cross
  - USS Micka (DE-176), named in his honor
- Jan Micka (born 1995), Czech swimmer
- Mike Micka (1921–1989), American football player
- Tomáš Micka (born 1983), Czech ice hockey player

== See also ==
- Mica (disambiguation)
