= German submarine U-860 =

German World War II submarine

History

Nazi Germany
- Name: U-860
- Ordered: 5 June 1941
- Builder: DeSchiMAG AG Weser, Bremen
- Yard number: 1066
- Laid down: 15 June 1942
- Launched: 23 March 1943
- Commissioned: 12 August 1943
- Fate: Sunk on 15 June 1944

General characteristics
- Class & type: Type IXD2 submarine
- Displacement: 1,610 t (1,580 long tons) surfaced; 1,799 t (1,771 long tons) submerged
- Length: 87.58 m (287 ft 4 in) o/a; 68.50 m (224 ft 9 in) pressure hull
- Beam: 7.50 m (24 ft 7 in) o/a; 4.40 m (14 ft 5 in) pressure hull
- Height: 10.20 m (33 ft 6 in)
- Draught: 5.35 m (17 ft 7 in)
- Installed power: 9,000 PS (6,620 kW; 8,880 bhp) (diesels); 1,000 PS (740 kW; 990 shp) (electric)
- Propulsion: 2 shafts; 2 × diesel engines; 2 × electric motors
- Speed: 20.8 knots (38.5 km/h; 23.9 mph) surfaced; 6.9 knots (12.8 km/h; 7.9 mph) submerged
- Range: 12,750 nmi (23,610 km; 14,670 mi) at 10 knots (19 km/h; 12 mph) surfaced; 57 nmi (106 km; 66 mi) at 4 knots (7.4 km/h; 4.6 mph) submerged
- Test depth: 230 m (750 ft)
- Complement: 66
- Armament: 6 × 53.3 cm (21 in) torpedo tubes (four bow, two stern); 24 × torpedoes or 48 TMA or 72 TMB naval mines; 1 × 3.7 cm (1.5 in) Flak M42 AA gun; 2 × twin 2 cm (0.79 in) C/30 anti-aircraft guns

Service record
- Part of: 4th U-boat Flotilla; 12 August 1943 – 31 March 1944; 12th U-boat Flotilla; 1 April – 15 June 1944
- Identification codes: M 54 813
- Commanders: K.Kapt. / F.Kapt. Paul Büchel; 12 August 1943 – 15 June 1944
- Operations: 1 patrol: 11 April – 15 June 1944
- Victories: None

German submarine U-860 was a long-range Type IXD2 U-boat built for Nazi Germany's Kriegsmarine during World War II.

She was ordered on 5 June 1941, and was laid down on 15 June 1942 at DeSchiMAG AG Weser, Bremen, as yard number 1066. She was launched on 23 March 1943 and commissioned under the command of Korvettenkapitän Paul Büchel on 12 August 1943.

== Design ==
German Type IXD2 submarines were considerably larger than the original Type IXs. U-860 had a displacement of 1,610 tonnes (1,580 long tons) when at the surface and 1,799 tonnes (1,771 long tons) while submerged. The U-boat had a total length of 87.58 m (287 ft 4 in), a pressure hull length of 68.50 m (224 ft 9 in), a beam of 7.50 m (24 ft 7 in), a height of 10.20 m (33 ft 6 in), and a draught of 5.35 m (17 ft 7 in). The submarine was powered by two MAN M 9 V 40/46 supercharged four-stroke, nine-cylinder diesel engines plus two MWM RS34.5S six-cylinder four-stroke diesel engines for cruising, producing a total of 9,000 metric horsepower (6,620 kW; 8,880 shp) for use while surfaced, two Siemens-Schuckert 2 GU 345/34 double-acting electric motors producing a total of 1,000 shaft horsepower (1,010 PS; 750 kW) for use while submerged. She had two shafts and two 1.85 m (6 ft) propellers. The boat was capable of operating at depths of up to 200 metres (660 ft).

The submarine had a maximum surface speed of 20.8 knots (38.5 km/h; 23.9 mph) and a maximum submerged speed of 6.9 knots (12.8 km/h; 7.9 mph). When submerged, the boat could operate for 121 nautical miles (224 km; 139 mi) at 2 knots (3.7 km/h; 2.3 mph); when surfaced, she could travel 12,750 nautical miles (23,610 km; 14,670 mi) at 10 knots (19 km/h; 12 mph). U-860 was fitted with six 53.3 cm (21 in) torpedo tubes (four fitted at the bow and two at the stern), 24 torpedoes, and a 3.7 cm (1.5 in) Flak M42 with 2575 rounds as well as two twin 2 cm (0.79 in) C/30 anti-aircraft guns with 8100 rounds. The boat had a complement of fifty-five.

== Service history ==
On 21 April 1944, only ten days into her first, and only, war patrol, U-860 was able to escape an incoming airplane by diving in an emergency crash dive, however, two of her crew were lost when they were unable to make it back inside the boat in time.

At 12:21 hrs on 15 June 1944, approximately 575 nautical miles (1,065 kilometres) south of St. Helena, U-860 again came under attack from an aircraft. This time it was an Avenger from the US Navy escort carrier Solomons of VC-9 piloted by LTJG W.F. Chamberlain. The Avenger was able to make four attack runs on U-860 before being shot down and crashing into the sea on the last, but not before sending a contact report back to Solomons.

At 19:22 hrs U-860 was again located by an Avenger from Solomons. Waiting for reinforcements, aircraft from Solomons began three coordinated attacks starting at 19:46 hrs. In the first attack U-860 was strafed by rockets from two Avengers, piloted by Lt. Cdr. H.M. Avery and Ens. M.J. Spear and two Wildcats piloted by Ens. T.J. Wadsworth and Ens. R.E. McMahon. U-860 was able to force Wadsworth, in his Wildcat, to return to Solomons after damaging his drop tank. McMahon and an Avenger, this one piloted by LTJG D.E. Weigle, followed up the first attack with another rocket attack. U-860 was struck by rockets in both of these attacks. In the last attack an Avenger piloted by LTJG W.F. Chamberlain dropped two depth charges directly forward of the conning tower while Lt. Cdr. Avery strafed U-860. Despite this, U-860 was able to hit Chamberlain's Avenger, which was also caught in the explosions of the depth charges, forcing him to ditch ahead of the boat. U-860 sank after this last attack with 30-40 of her crew making it off. USS Straub and USS Herzog arrived during the night and were able to rescue 20 crewmen, including her commander, FKpt. Paul Büchel, however, no trace of Chamberlain or his crew were found.

The wreck lies at 25°27′S 05°30′W.

== Bibliography ==
- Busch, Rainer; Röll, Hans-Joachim (1997). Der U-Boot-Krieg, 1939-1945: Die deutschen U-Boot-Kommandanten (in German). Vol. II. Mittler. ISBN 3-8132-0509-6.
- Busch, Rainer; Röll, Hans-Joachim (1999). German U-boat Commanders of World War II: A Biographical Dictionary. Translated by Brooks, Geoffrey. Greenhill Books, Naval Institute Press. ISBN 1-55750-186-6.
- Busch, Rainer; Röll, Hans-Joachim (1999). Der U-Boot-Krieg, 1939-1945: Deutsche U-Boot-Verluste von September 1939 bis Mai 1945 [German U-boat losses from September 1939 to May 1945] (in German). Vol. IV. Mittler. ISBN 3-8132-0514-2.
- Gröner, Eric; Jung, Dieter; Maass, Martin (1991). German Warships 1815-1945. Vol. 2: U-boats and Mine Warfare Vessels. Translated by Thomas, Keith; Magowan, Rachel. Conway Maritime Press. ISBN 0-85177-593-4.
- Sharpe, Peter (1998). U-Boat Fact File. Midland Publishing. ISBN 1-85780-072-9.
- Syrett, David (1999). "Communications Intelligence and the Sinking of U-860, April–June 1944". Mariner's Mirror. 85 (1): 68–75. doi:10.1080/00253359.1999.10656728. ISSN 2049-680X.
