= Micah (disambiguation) =

Micah is a Hebrew given name.

Micah may also refer to:

- Book of Micah, in the Hebrew Bible, attributed to Micah the Prophet
  - Micah (prophet), its attributed author
- Micah, from Micah's Idol narrative in the Book of Judges (Bible)
- Micah Challenge UK, British anti-poverty coalition
- Micah Clarke, 1889 novel by Arthur Conan Doyle
- Micah (novel), 2006 novel by Laurell K. Hamilton
- Micah (wrestler), a ring name used by Tanga Loa (born 1983)
- International Civilian Support Mission in Haiti (MICAH), a UN peacebuilding mission deployed in 2000–2001
- Micah Bell, a fictional character from the 2018 video game Red Dead Redemption 2

== See also ==
- Mica (disambiguation)
- Myka (disambiguation)
- Micaiah (disambiguation)
