= USS Gustafson =

Cannon-class destroyer escort

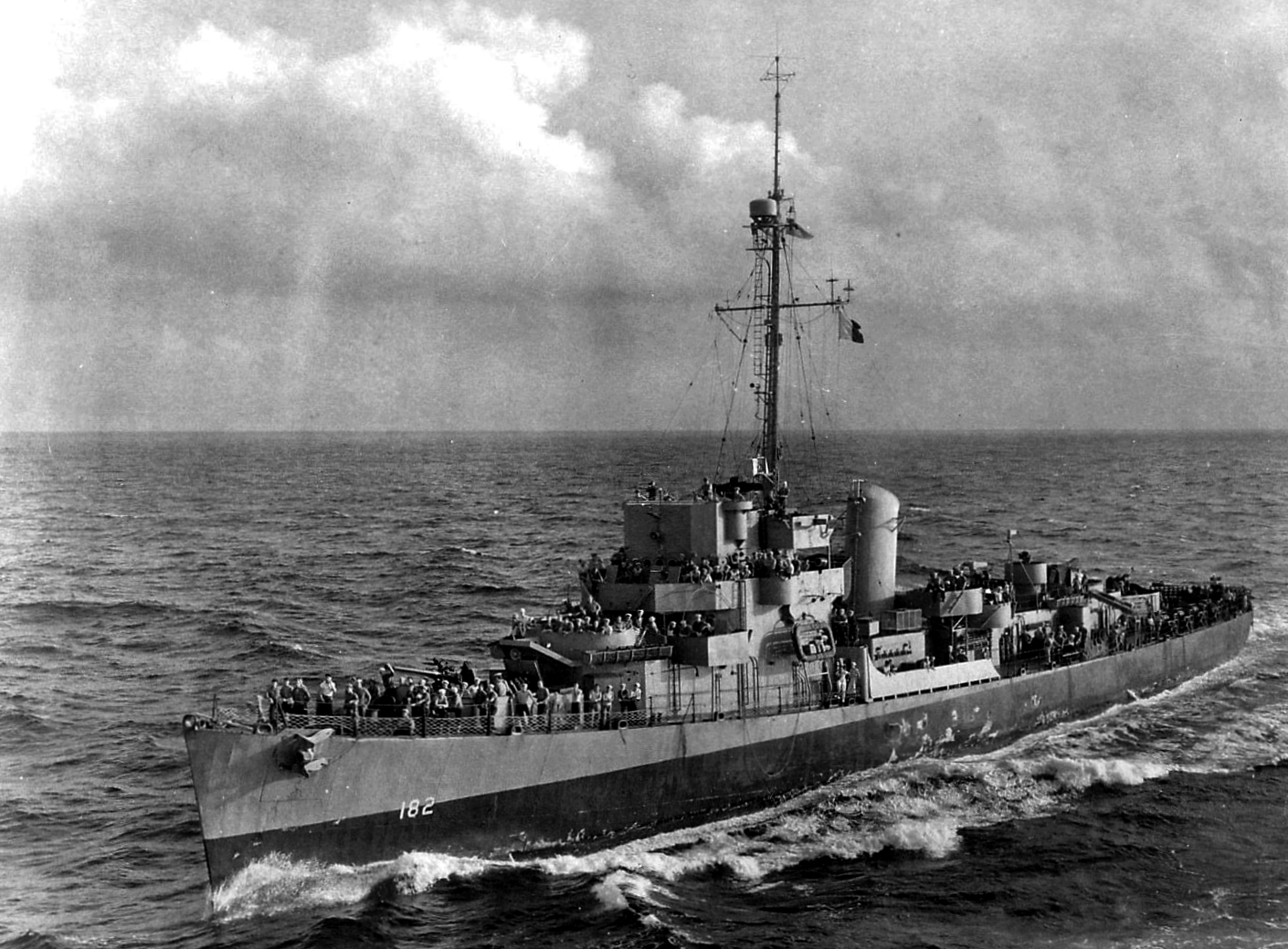

History

United States
- Name: USS Gustafson
- Namesake: Arthur Leonard Gustafson
- Builder: Federal Shipbuilding and Drydock Company, Newark, New Jersey
- Laid down: 5 July 1943
- Launched: 3 October 1943
- Commissioned: 1 November 1943
- Decommissioned: 26 June 1946
- Stricken: 20 December 1950
- Honors and awards: 1 battle star (World War II)
- Fate: Transferred to the Netherlands, 23 October 1950

Netherlands
- Name: HNLMS Van Ewijk (F808)
- Acquired: 23 October 1950
- Fate: Returned to US Navy, 15 December 1967; Sold for scrapping, February 1968

General characteristics
- Class & type: Cannon-class destroyer escort
- Displacement: 1,240 long tons (1,260 t) standard; 1,620 long tons (1,646 t) full
- Length: 306 ft (93 m) o/a; 300 ft (91 m) w/l
- Beam: 36 ft 10 in (11.23 m)
- Draft: 11 ft 8 in (3.56 m)
- Propulsion: 4 × GM Mod. 16-278A diesel engines with electric drive, 6,000 shp (4,474 kW), 2 screws
- Speed: 21 knots (39 km/h; 24 mph)
- Range: 10,800 nmi (20,000 km) at 12 kn (22 km/h; 14 mph)
- Complement: 15 officers and 201 enlisted
- Armament: 3 × single Mk.22 3"/50 caliber guns; 1 × twin 40 mm Mk.1 AA gun; 8 × 20 mm Mk.4 AA guns; 3 × 21 inch (533 mm) torpedo tubes; 1 × Hedgehog Mk.10 anti-submarine mortar (144 rounds); 8 × Mk.6 depth charge projectors; 2 × Mk.9 depth charge tracks

USS Gustafson (DE-182) was a Cannon-class destroyer escort in service with the United States Navy from 1943 to 1946. In 1950, she was transferred to the Royal Netherlands Navy where she served as Hr.Ms. Van Ewijck (F808) until 1967. She was scrapped in 1968.

== History ==
=== United States Navy (1943-1950) ===
USS Gustafson was launched on 3 October 1943 by the Federal Shipbuilding & Drydock Co., Newark, New Jersey; sponsored by Mrs. Eva Smythe Stevens, widow of Lt. Gustafson; and commissioned on 1 November 1943.

Following shakedown training, Gustafson escorted coastal convoys in waters ranging from New York to Galveston, Texas. On 20 February 1944 she departed New York in the screen of two escort carriers for duty with Admiral Jonas H. Ingrain's U.S. 4th Fleet based at Recife, Brazil. This fleet kept down the German U-boat and raider menace in waters running south from Trinidad to the tip of South America, and across to the coast of Africa. On 14 April 1943, the destroyer escort put to sea in company with escort carrier Solomons (CVE-67) to sweep the Atlantic Narrows. On the 23rd, Gustafson made an unsuccessful hedgehog attack on a target that was probably U-196. Due south of St. Helena Island, on 15 June 1943, aircraft launched by Solomons sank the U-860.

Gustafson continued anti-submarine patrol and convoy escort in the South Atlantic. Operating out of Recife and Bahia, Brazil, she helped cover coastal waters from the border of French Guiana down to Rio de Janeiro and across the Atlantic narrows more than halfway to the coast of Africa.

On 22 November 1944, while escorting Navy transport General M. C. Meigs (AP-116) to a mid-way rendezvous in the Atlantic Narrows, she closed alongside cruiser Omaha (CL-4) to pass orders and the two ships collided. Both ships suffered damage but were able to complete the mid-ocean rendezvous escort mission. After temporary repairs at Bahia, Brazil, Gustafson proceeded north to the New York Navy Yard, arriving on 21 December 1944. During a swift overhaul she received additional armament and a new Combat Information Center.

Gustafson departed New York on 22 January 1945 for anti-submarine warfare refresher training out of Key West, Florida. From there she proceeded in the escort of a slow convoy to Trinidad and ports of South America. She returned north in March and was stationed at Casco Bay as U-857 apparently moved into the Gulf of Maine. A torpedo attack that damaged the tanker SS Atlantic States just north of Cape Cod on 5 April 1945 alerted the U.S. Navy that a U-boat was operating in American waters (the attack was later attributed to the U-857). Units of Escort Division 30, under the command of Commander Ralph R. Curry, USCG, had been undergoing refresher training at Casco Bay when Allied warships were ordered to form a "hunter-killer" group to search for the U-boat that made the attack on the tanker.

The hunter-killer group consisted of the U.S. Coast Guard-staffed frigate USS Knoxville, from which Curry flew his pennant, along with another Coast Guard-staffed frigate, Eugene, and two destroyer escorts, Gustafson and Micka (DE-176). The Gustafson located a sonar contact in the waters northeast of Cape Cod in the early morning of 7 April, and she attacked the target with hedgehogs, but these failed to produce an explosion. She then attacked again, and this time at least one charge was heard to explode on contact with a submerged object. Gustafson then launched four more hedgehog attacks without achieving any further explosions. Once daylight arrived, Gustafson's crew sighted a large oil slick.

After the end of World War II, the U.S. Navy reviewed captured German records and compared them with the reports of attacks conducted by Allied warships on possible German submarine contacts. The U-857 was reported missing by the German U-boat Command in April in the area of the attack by Gustafson. The U.S. Navy then gave credit for the sinking of U-857 to Gustafson. This sinking credit was included on this list because the Gustafson was part of a task force that was commanded by a U.S. Coast Guard officer.

However, the Foreign Documents Section of the Naval Historical Branch of the U.K. Ministry of Defense revoked this credit in April 1994, surmising that the Gustafson attack was "very probably directed against a nonsub target." Axel Niestlé, in his 'German U-boat Losses During World War II: Details of Destruction' (Annapolis: Naval Institute Press, 1998) claims that "There is presently no known explanation for U-857's loss." Both citations are from Niestlé's U-boat Losses, page 238, note 145.

Gustafson trained out of New London, Connecticut, with submarines until 18 May 1945 when she put to sea as a unit of the escort for a convoy bound to Oran, Algeria. She returned to Charleston, South Carolina on 13 June 1945 and thence to Guantanamo Bay, Cuba, for refresher training.

Gustafson departed Guantanamo Bay on 24 July 1945 and transited the Panama Canal the 27th on her way to San Diego, California. She sailed for Hawaii on 9 August to be refitted with more anti-aircraft guns for Pacific service and was on the high seas when hostilities ceased with Japan on 15 August 1945. Her base Pearl Harbor, she served as a weather patrol ship north of Hawaii for the remainder of the year, thence via San Diego for return to the Atlantic seaboard.

She transited the Panama Canal on 27 January 1946 for inactivation at Green Cove Springs, Florida. She decommissioned there on 26 June 1946.

=== Royal Netherlands Navy (1950-1967) ===
Gustafson remained in reserve until 23 October 1950 when she was transferred to the Netherlands under terms of the Military Defense Program. She served the Netherlands Navy as Hr.Ms. Van Ewijk (F808). She was returned to the U.S. on 15 December 1967, and sold in February 1968, and scrapped.

== Awards ==
Gustafson received one battle star for World War II service.
