= Mica (disambiguation) =

Mica is a group of sheet silicate minerals.

Mica, MiCA, MICA, or MICAS may also refer to:

== Acronyms ==
- Mahone Islands Conservation Association
- Ministry of Information, Communications and the Arts (MICA), the former name for the Ministry of Communications and Information under the Government of Singapore
- Maryland Institute College of Art, in Baltimore, Maryland, US
- Markets in Crypto-Assets, a regulation under EU law
- Mesures individuelles de contrôle administratif et de surveillance, a system established by France's 2021 anti-terrorism law (the fr:Loi relative à la prévention d'actes de terrorisme et au renseignement) under which the movements of certain people may be legally restricted
- Multimedia, Information, Communication & Applications, an international research institute in Hanoi, Vietnam
- Mudra Institute of Communications Ahmedabad, a postgraduate school in Ahemdabad, India
- Mobile Intensive Care Ambulance, an advanced prehospital care ambulance used in Australia and the United Arab Emirates
- MICA (missile), a French anti-aircraft missile system
- MHC class I polypeptide-related sequence A, a cell surface protein

== Places ==
=== In Romania ===
- Mica, Cluj, a commune in Cluj County, Romania
- Mica, Mureș, a commune in Mureș County, Romania
- Mica, a village in Bascov Commune, Argeș County, Romania

=== In the United States ===
- Mica, Georgia, an unincorporated community
- Mica, Idaho, an unincorporated community in Idaho
- Mica, Virginia, an unincorporated community
- Mica, Washington, an unincorporated community
- Mica Peak, two adjacent peaks of the same name in Idaho and Washington

=== Elsewhere ===
- Mica Creek, a village and ski resort in British Columbia, Canada

== People ==
- Mica (footballer, born 1904), Alfredo Pereira de Mello (1904–1989), Brazilian footballer
- Mica (footballer, born 1958), Dalmir Estigarribia (1958–2019), Brazilian footballer
- Mica Burton, American actress, cosplayer and host
- Mica Levi (born 1987), English musician
- Mica Pinto, Michael Gonçalves Pinto (born 1993), Luxembourger footballer

== Other ==
- MicA RNA, a bacterial small RNA
- Milica, a female given name, for which "Mica" is a nickname
- "Mica", a song by Mission of Burma from their 1982 album Vs.
- DEC MICA, an unreleased operating system from Digital Equipment Corporation, which later inspired the architecture of Windows NT
- Mica DIY, a UK symbol group of retailers

== See also ==
- Mika, a given name and surname
- Micah (disambiguation)
- Myka (disambiguation)
- Micathermic heater
