= USS Solomons =

Casablanca-class escort carrier of the U.S. Navy

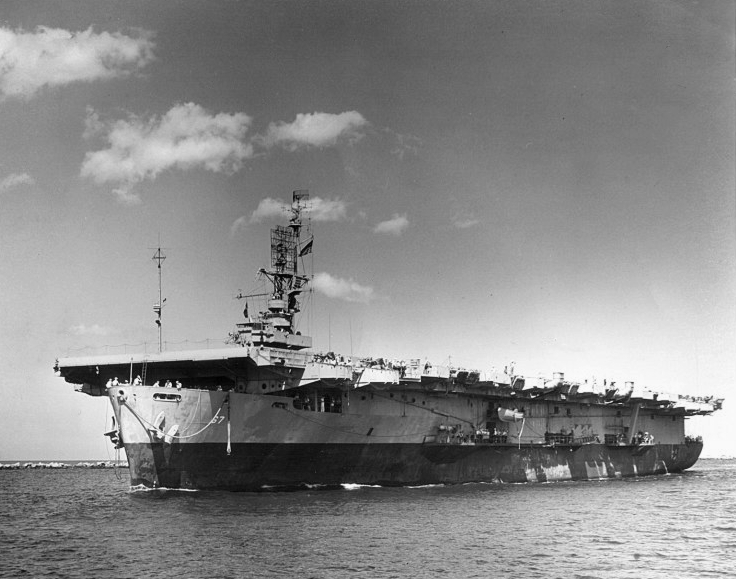
- USS Solomons's port bow photographed whilst moored, circa 1945.

History

United States
- Name: Emperor (1943); Nassuk Bay (1943); Solomons (1943–64)
- Namesake: Solomon Islands campaign
- Ordered: as a Type S4-S2-BB3 hull, MC hull 1104
- Awarded: 18 June 1942
- Builder: Kaiser Shipyards
- Laid down: 19 March 1943
- Launched: 6 October 1943
- Commissioned: 21 November 1943
- Decommissioned: 15 May 1946
- Stricken: 5 June 1946
- Identification: ACV-67 (1943); CVE-67 (1943–46)
- Fate: Scrapped in 1947

General characteristics
- Class & type: Casablanca-class escort carrier
- Displacement: 8,188 long tons (8,319 t) (standard); 10,902 long tons (11,077 t) (full load)
- Length: 512 ft 3 in (156.13 m) (oa); 490 ft (150 m) (wl); 474 ft (144 m) (fd)
- Beam: 65 ft 2 in (19.86 m); 108 ft (33 m) (extreme width)
- Draft: 20 ft 9 in (6.32 m) (max)
- Installed power: 4 × Babcock & Wilcox boilers; 9,000 shp (6,700 kW)
- Propulsion: 2 × Skinner Unaflow reciprocating steam engines; 2 × screws
- Speed: 19 knots (35 km/h; 22 mph)
- Range: 10,240 nmi (18,960 km; 11,780 mi) at 15 kn (28 km/h; 17 mph)
- Complement: Total: 910 – 916 officers and men; Embarked Squadron: 50 – 56; Ship's Crew: 860
- Armament: As designed: 1 × 5 in (127 mm)/38 cal dual-purpose gun; 4 × twin 40 mm (1.57 in) Bofors anti-aircraft guns; 12 × 20 mm (0.79 in) Oerlikon anti-aircraft cannons; Varied, ultimate armament: 1 × 5 in (127 mm)/38 cal dual-purpose gun; 8 × twin 40 mm (1.57 in) Bofors anti-aircraft guns; 20 × 20 mm (0.79 in) Oerlikon anti-aircraft cannons
- Aircraft carried: 27
- Aviation facilities: 1 × catapult; 2 × elevators

Service record
- Part of: United States Pacific Fleet (1943–1944); United States Atlantic Fleet (1944–1946); Atlantic Reserve Fleet (1946)
- Operations: Battle of the Atlantic

USS Solomons (CVE-67) was the 13th of 50 Casablanca-class escort carriers built for the United States Navy during World War II. She was the first Navy vessel named after the Solomon Islands campaign, a lengthy operation that most famously included the Guadalcanal campaign, albeit she was not the first to be named Solomons. (Note: The first Solomons was a wooden-hulled ferry with the hull symbol YFB-23 named after Solomons, Maryland, that spent most of World War II conducting ferry services at Midway Atoll.) The ship was launched in October 1943, commissioned in November, and served in antisubmarine operations during the Battle of the Atlantic, as well as in other miscellaneous training and transport missions. Her frontline duty consisted of four antisubmarine patrols, with her third tour being the most notable, when her aircraft contingent sank the German submarine U-860. She was decommissioned in August 1946, being mothballed in the Atlantic Reserve Fleet. Ultimately, she was broken up in 1947.

== Design and description ==
A side profile of the design of Thetis Bay

Solomons was a Casablanca-class escort carrier, the most numerous type of aircraft carriers ever built. Built to stem heavy losses during the Battle of the Atlantic, they came into service in late 1943, when the U-boat threat was already in retreat. Although some did see service in the Atlantic, most were used in the Pacific, ferrying aircraft, providing logistics support, and conducting close air support for the island-hopping campaigns. The Casablanca-class carriers were built on the standardized Type S4-S2-BB3 hull, a lengthened variant of the Doyen-class hull, and specifically designed to be mass-produced using welded, prefabricated sections. This allowed them to be produced at unprecedented speeds; the final ship of her class, Munda, was delivered to the Navy just 101 days after the laying of her keel.

Solomons had an 512 ft 3 in (156.13 m) overall length (490 ft (150 m) at the waterline), a beam of 65 ft 2 in (19.86 m), and a draft of 20 ft 9 in (6.32 m). She displaced 8,188 long tons (8,319 t) standard, which increased to 10,902 long tons (11,077 t) with a full load. To carry out flight operations, the ship had a 257 ft (78 m) hangar deck and a 474 ft (144 m) flight deck. Her compact size necessitated the installation of an aircraft catapult at her bow, and two aircraft elevators facilitated movement of aircraft between the flight and hangar deck, one each fore and aft.

She was powered by four Babcock and Wilcox Express D boilers that raised 285 psi (1,970 kPa) of steam at 577 °F (303 °C). The steam generated by these boilers fed two Skinner Unaflow reciprocating steam engines, delivering 9,000 hp (6,700 kW) to two propeller shafts. This allowed her to reach speeds of 19 kn (35 km/h; 22 mph), with a cruising range of 10,240 nmi (18,960 km; 11,780 mi) at 15 kn (28 km/h; 17 mph). For armament, one 5 in (127 mm)/38 caliber, dual-purpose gun was mounted on the stern. Additional antiaircraft defense was provided by eight Bofors 40 mm (1.57 in) antiaircraft guns in single mounts and 12 Oerlikon 20 mm (0.79 in) cannons mounted around the perimeter of the deck. By 1945, Casablanca-class carriers had been modified to carry 20 Oerlikon cannons and 16 Bofors guns; the doubling of the latter was accomplished by putting them into twin mounts. Sensors onboard consisted of a SG surface-search radar and a SK air-search radar.

Although Casablanca-class escort carriers were intended to function with a crew of 860 and an embarked squadron of 50 to 56, the exigencies of wartime often necessitated the inflation of the crew count. They were designed to operate with 27 aircraft, but the hangar deck could accommodate many more during transport or training missions.

== Construction ==
Her construction was awarded to Kaiser Shipbuilding Company, Vancouver, Washington, under a Maritime Commission contract, on 18 June 1942. The escort carrier was laid down on 19 March 1943 under the name Emperor, with the intention of transferring her to the Royal Navy under Lend-Lease. She was laid down as MC hull 1104, the 13th of a series of 50 Casablanca-class escort carriers. On 28 June 1943, with the Bogue-class escort carrier Pybus having been designated to be transferred in her place, Emperor was redesignated as an auxiliary aircraft carrier, so received the hull symbol ACV-67, indicating that she was the 67th escort carrier to be commissioned into the United States Navy (USN). As a part of this change, she was also renamed to Nassuk Bay, as part of a tradition that named escort carriers after bays or sounds in Alaska. On 15 July, with the handover of Pybus having been completed, she was redesignated as an escort carrier and received her final hull symbol of CVE-67. She was launched on 6 October 1943; sponsored by Mrs. F. J. McKenna; transferred to the USN, renamed to Solomons as part of a new naval policy which named subsequent Casablanca-class carriers after naval or land engagements, and commissioned on 21 November 1943, with Captain Marion Edward Crist in command.

== Service history ==
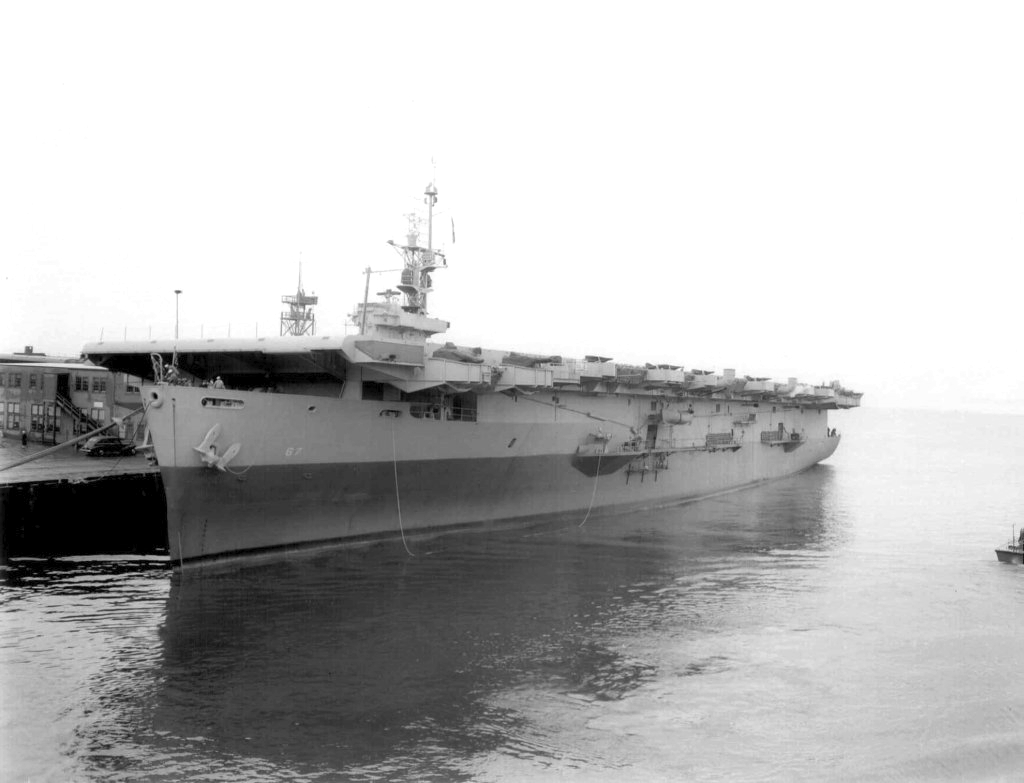
Solomons photographed moored to Pier No. 2, Astoria, Oregon, 30 November 1943

Upon being commissioned, Solomons underwent a shakedown cruise in the area between Puget Sound and Astoria, Oregon, conducting tests, evaluations, and training exercises for four weeks. She left Astoria on 20 December, making a stop at Alameda, California on 23 December, and arriving at San Diego on 25 December. There, after conducting some more exercises, she departed for Pearl Harbor on 30 December. On 6 January 1944, she took on a load of passengers and supplies, as well as dysfunctional aircraft to be taken to the West Coast for repairs or salvage. She left on 9 January, arriving back at San Diego on 14 January. For the rest of January, she conducted battle practices off Southern California. She left San Diego with a load of aircraft on 30 January for the East Coast. As she approached the Panama Canal, her aircraft participated in a simulated aerial attack on the canal to test its defenses. She stopped at Balboa, Panama on 9 February, where she embarked passengers, and departed on 11 February, arriving at the naval station in Norfolk, Virginia, on 16 February.

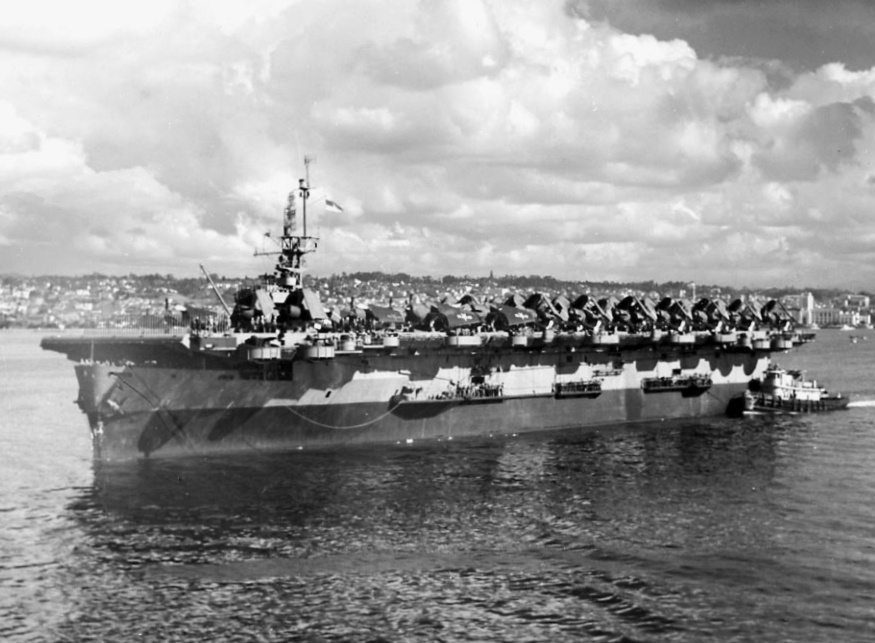
Solomons photographed leaving San Diego Bay with a load of aircraft, 31 December 1943

At Norfolk, Solomons took on her aircraft contingent of Composite Squadron (VC) 9, supplies and aviation stores, before putting out to sea on 21 March for Brazil. She arrived at Recife on 13 April, and upon arriving, joined the United States Fourth Fleet for antisubmarine duties in the South Atlantic, under the command of Vice Admiral Jonas H. Ingram. She joined Task Group 46.1, which centered around Solomons, screened by the destroyer escorts Herzog, Trumpeter, Straub, and Gustafson. On 14 April, she began her first antisubmarine patrol. Her first patrol, which lasted until 30 April, proved to be uneventful. The only indications of possible contact were some green flares spotted on the morning of 22 April, as well as some unsuccessful Hedgehog attacks on a signature that might have been German submarine U-196. Her second patrol, from 4 May to 20 May, had even less activity.

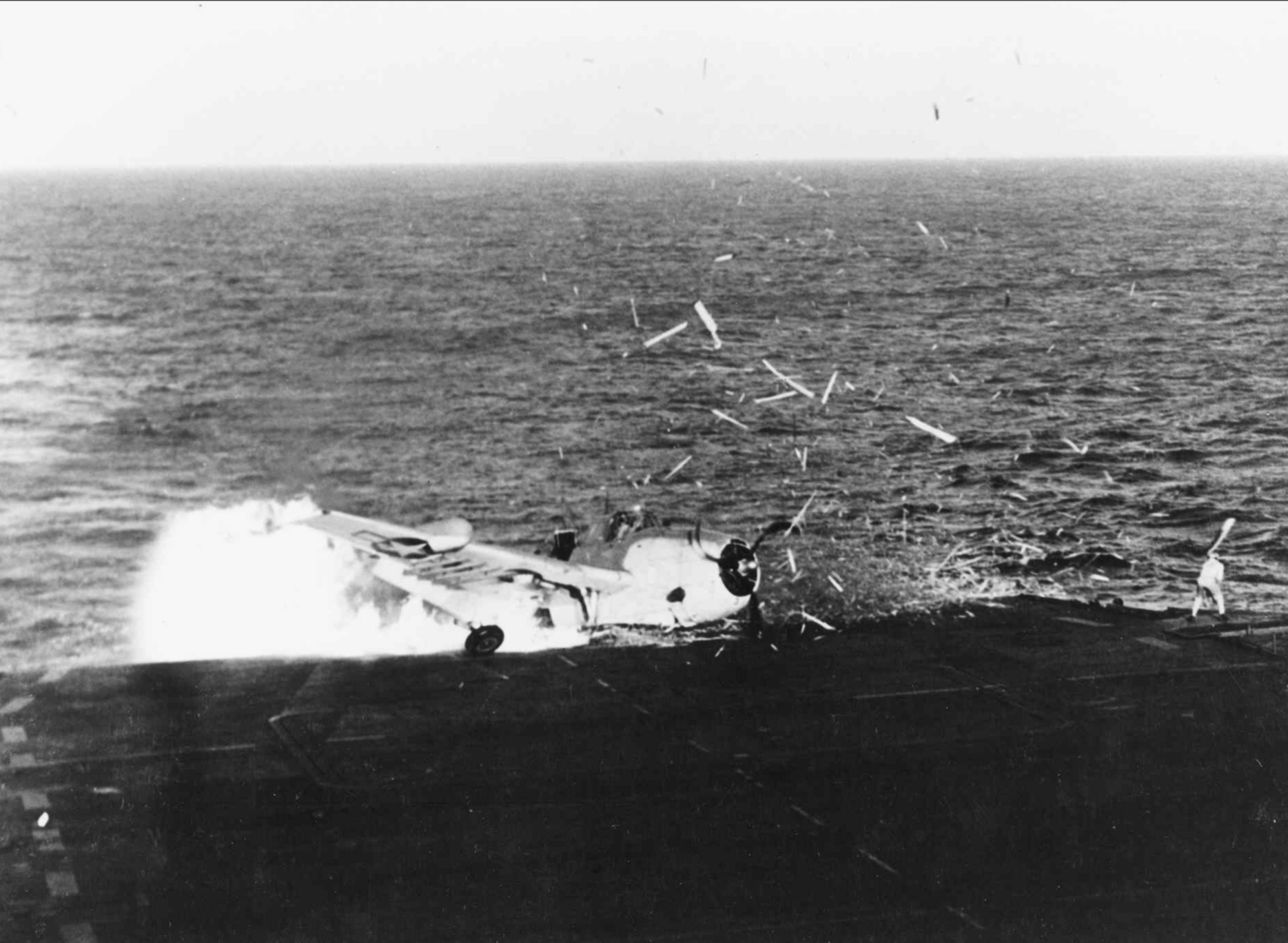
An Avenger (Bureau Number 24295), of VC-9, piloted by Ens. G.E. Edwards, hits the ramp of Solomons, 25 March 1944 The two aviators within were rescued, but they were to perish in the attack on U-860 on 15 June 1944.

Solomons departed Recife for her third patrol on 30 May. A submarine had been spotted off of Salvador proceeding to the northeast, and the task group was dispatched after it, without any results. The task group spent the front half of its patrol chasing several signature reports, including one about a Japanese flying boat, but with no results. However, high-frequency direction finding had picked up a lead of a U-boat off southwestern Africa heading on a northwesterly course on 9 June. Thus, the task group went to the northeast to possibly intercept.

In the midst of her patrol, on 15 June, one of VC-9's Avenger torpedo bombers, piloted by Ensign G.E. Edwards, reported a contact at a bearing of 70° and some 50 mi (80 km) from the carrier at 10:21. The Avenger proceeded towards the contact, and no further word was relayed back. In fact, it had spotted the Type IXD2 German submarine U-860 at 12:21 as it proceeded about 575 nmi (1,065 km; 662 mi) south of St. Helena. The Avenger immediately made four attack runs against U-860 and was shot down by antiaircraft fire on the fourth run, killing all three of the Avenger's crew. However, the Avenger had managed to inflict enough damage on the submarine such that she could not safely dive, which later proved fatal for U-860. Around 14:00, a group finally was cobbled together on Solomons to investigate Edwards' report. At 17:22, VC-9's commanding officer, Lieutenant Commander H.M. Avery, spotted a wake about 11 mi (18 km) away. Proceeding closer, he could observe that it was U-860 on a southeasterly course, proceeding at about 15 kn (28 km/h; 17 mph), whereupon he immediately issued a contact report back to Solomons. Two of Solomons's screening vessels, destroyer escorts Straub and Herzog, were immediately dispatched to Avery's contact. As the Avenger moved closer, the gunners on U-860 threw up a screen of flak, convincing Avery to wait for reinforcements. As Avery was transmitting his contact report back, two Wildcat fighters and one Avenger were preparing to land on Solomons, having been unsuccessful in spotting any targets. Upon receiving the news, the three aircraft turned around and headed to join Avery.

The three aircraft met with Avery, and a series of three organized attacks was planned; the attacks were launched at 19:46, under the waning evening sun. In the first attack, U-860 was first strafed by the two Wildcats piloted by Ensigns T.J. Wadsworth and R.E. McMahon, while the submarine moved in evasive circles, unable to dive. Hits were observed on the submarine's deck, conning tower, and bandstand. As the two Wildcats pulled up from their dive, only about 100 ft (30 m) above U-860, Wadsworth's Wildcat was damaged by flak in a wing tank, forcing him to return to Solomons. The two Avengers, piloted by Avery and Ensign M.J. Spear, followed up with rockets, as the Wildcats were being harried by flak. The pilots of VC-9 had been trained to aim their rockets to hit to the fore of the conning tower, where the most vulnerable systems laid. Spear's Avenger, flying from the aft of the submarine, fired eight rockets from 800 yd (730 m), six of which were observed connecting with the U-boat just to the starboard fore of the conning tower. Avery's Avenger, flying from the fore, fired six rockets from 600 yd (550 m), all of which connected with the front of the U-boat, some 20 ft (6.1 m) in front of the conning tower.

Following this attack, U-860 started to slow down and turn southwards. At 17:51, two more aircraft arrived on the scene, two Avengers, one piloted by Lieutenant, j.g. W.F. Chamberlain, and one piloted by Lieutenant, j.g. D.E. Weigle. The two aircraft immediately engaged U-860, with McMahon's Wildcat making another strafing run to try to suppress antiaircraft fire. In the second attack, Weigle, running in from the fore, fired eight rockets, six of which connected in the area to the fore of the conning tower. Following this run, U-860 slowed down to just a crawl, at only 3 kn (5.6 km/h; 3.5 mph). In the third and final attack, Chamberlain, charging from the port, dropped two depth charges directly forward of the conning tower, while Lt. Cdr. Avery strafed U-860 to suppress antiaircraft fire. However, Chamberlain proceeded much too low, dropping the depth charges only 50 ft (15 m) over the submarine. The explosions rocked his aircraft, starting a fire in the bomb bay and the central cockpit. Chamberlain maintained a semblance of control and came to a relatively soft landing 500 yd (460 m) to the starboard of the sinking U-boat. U-860 sank after this last attack, at 19:53, with 42 of her crew going down with the boat.

Straub and Herzog arrived during the night. Under the darkness, the two destroyers were forced to rely heavily upon Solomon's aircraft, which fired starshells and dropped flares. First, they attempted to recover Chamberlain and his crew, but were unable to find any trace of them. They then proceeded to the submarine's wreck, where Straub began rescuing survivors, while Herzog provided a screen. Straub eventually recovered 21 crewmen, including U-860's commander, Fregattenkapitän Paul Büchel. One of the survivors was resuscitated only after 20 minutes of artificial respiration. Solomons continued her third patrol until 23 June, when she returned to Recife to refuel and disembark the captured German sailors.

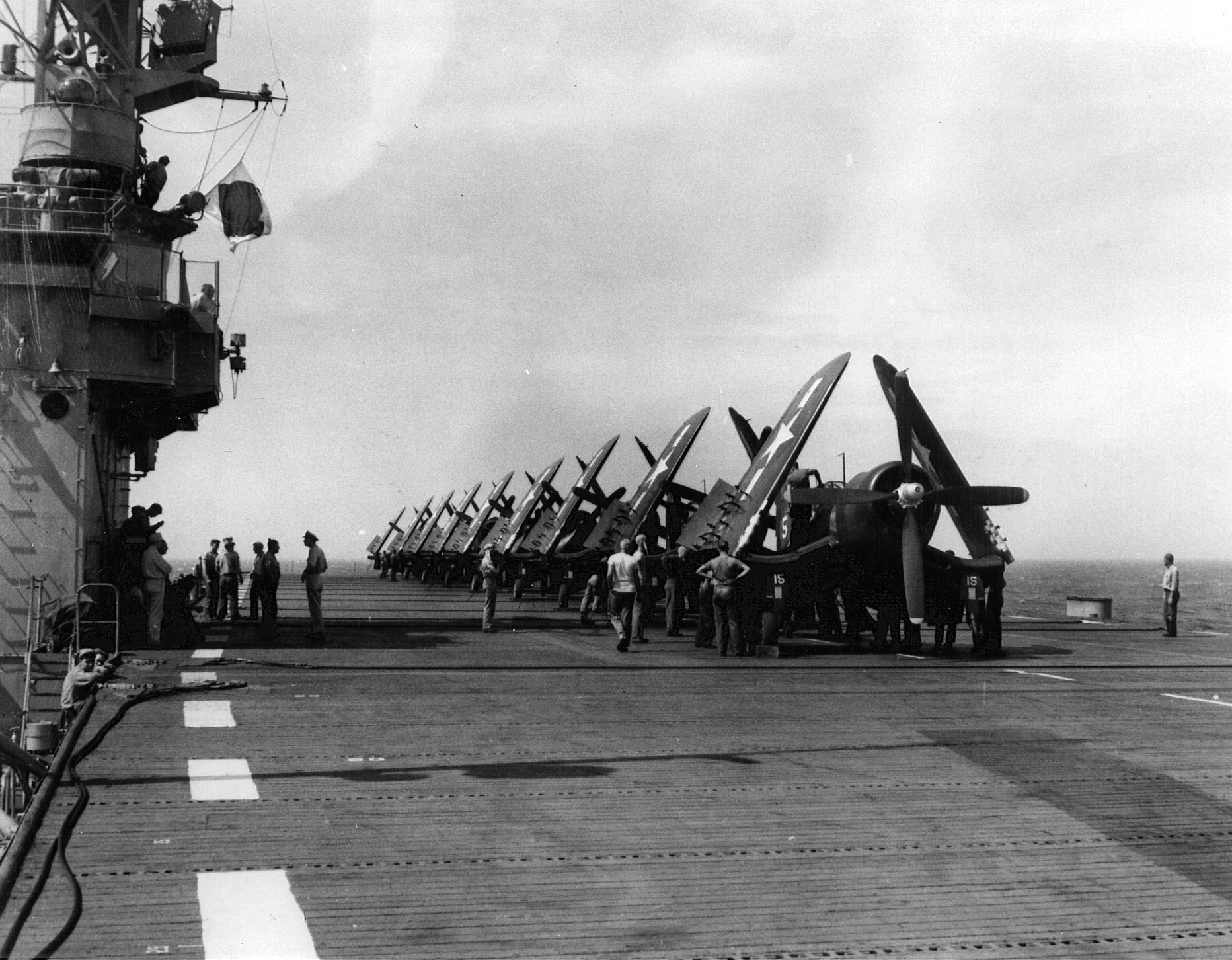
F4U-4 Corsairs of Bombing Fighting Squadron (VBF) 3 "Swordsmen", which was undergoing pilot qualification trainings at the time, photographed with their wings folded up on the flight deck of Solomons, July 1945, off of Florida's Atlantic coast

Following a fourth antisubmarine patrol, as well as a stop at Rio de Janeiro, Solomons sailed back north to Naval Station Norfolk, arriving on 24 August. She moored at Norfolk for a month before heading for Staten Island, New York City, docking there on 25 September. She took on a load of 150 Army airmen, along with their P-47 Thunderbolt fighters, and departed on 6 October, on a mission to ferry them to Casablanca, French Morocco. She was back at the East Coast on 7 November, anchored within Narrangansett Bay, Rhode Island.

For the rest of 1944, Solomons served as a training carrier, qualifying USN and Marine pilots in carrier landings, initially off of Quonset Point. In January 1945, she steamed southwards to Port Everglades, Florida, where she continued to qualify pilots throughout the rest of 1945. At Port Everglades, Captain Richard Stanley Moss raised his flag over the vessel. For a week in December 1945, she was diverted from her mission to participate in a search for the 14 missing airmen of Flight 19, as well as the 13 airmen from a Martin PBM Mariner flying boat that went missing after being dispatched to look for Flight 19. On 15 February 1946, Captain Allen Smith Jr. took over command of the vessel.

Having finished her qualification duties, Solomons proceeded north to the naval shipyard at Boston, Massachusetts, where she was decommissioned on 15 May, joining the Boston group of the Atlantic Reserve Fleet. She was struck from the Navy list on 5 June 1946, and she was sold for scrapping in December 1946 to the Patapsco Scrap Corp., headquartered at Bethlehem, Pennsylvania. She was delivered to its agent at Newport on 22 December. She ultimately was broken up in 1947.
