= Micajah =

Micajah is a given name. Notable people with the name include:

== People ==
- Micajah Autry (1794–1836), American merchant, poet and lawyer who died in the Texas Revolution at the Battle of the Alamo
- Micajah Burnett (1791–1879), American Shaker architect, builder, engineer, surveyor, mathematician, and town planner
- Micajah Coffin (1734–1827), American mariner and politician who served as a member of the Massachusetts House of Representatives
- Micajah Harpe (1748–1799), Scottish-born American serial killer, highwayman, and river pirate
- Micajah Thomas Hawkins (1790–1858), U.S. Congressman from North Carolina from 1803 to 1809
- Micajah C. Henley (1856–1927), American industrialist and inventor based in Richmond, Indiana
- Micajah W. Kirby (1798–1882), American politician and New York state senator
- Micajah Woods (1844–1911), American lawyer from Virginia, the Commonwealth's Attorney in Charlottesville, president of the Virginia Bar Association

== Places ==
- Micajah, West Virginia, town in West Virginia, United States

== See also ==
- Micajah Heights, Massachusetts, neighborhood in Plymouth, Massachusetts, United States
- Micajah Pond (Massachusetts), 20-acre (81,000 m^{2}) pond located in Plymouth, Massachusetts
- Micaiah (disambiguation)
