= USS Natoma Bay =

Casablanca-class escort carrier of the US Navy

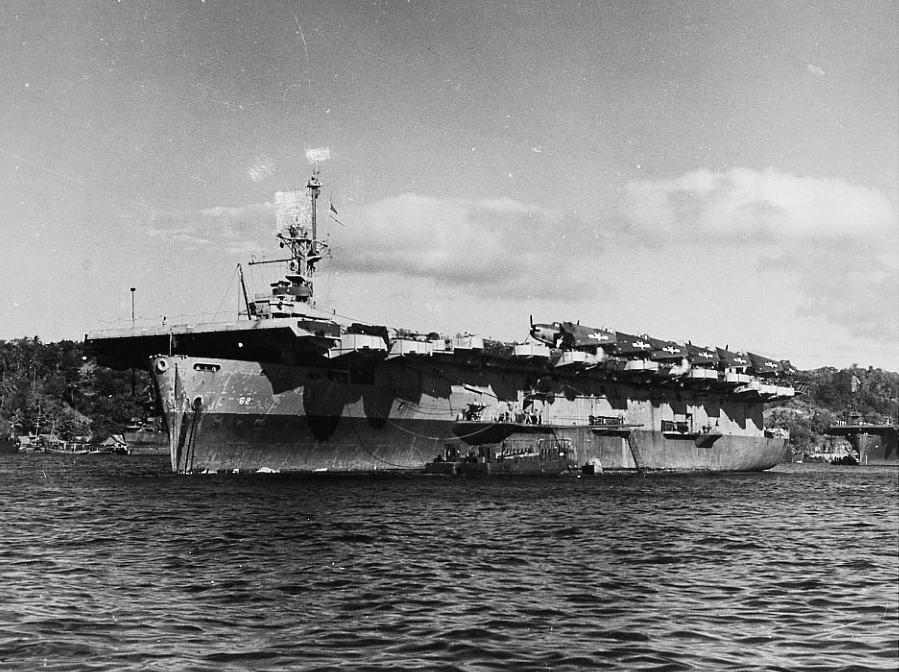
- USS Natoma Bay in April 1944

History

United States
- Name: USS Natoma Bay
- Namesake: Natoma Bay in Alaska
- Builder: Kaiser Shipyards
- Laid down: 17 January 1943
- Launched: 20 July 1943
- Commissioned: 14 October 1943
- Decommissioned: 20 May 1946
- Stricken: 1 September 1958
- Fate: Sold for scrap, 30 July 1959

General characteristics
- Class & type: Casablanca-class escort carrier
- Displacement: 7,800 tons
- Length: 512 ft (156 m) overall
- Beam: 65 ft (20 m)
- Draft: 22 ft 6 in (6.86 m)
- Propulsion: 2 × 5-cylinder reciprocating Skinner Unaflow engines; 4 × 285 psi boilers; 2 shafts, 9,000 shp
- Speed: 19 knots (35 km/h)
- Range: 10,240 nmi (18,960 km) at 15 kn (28 km/h)
- Complement: 860 officers and men; Embarked Squadron: 50 to 56 officers and men; Total: 910 to 916 officers and men.
- Armament: 1 × 5 in (127 mm)/38 cal DP gun; 16 × 40 mm AA cannon in 8 twin mounts; 20 × 20 mm guns AA machine guns in single mounts
- Aircraft carried: 27

Service record
- Part of: United States Pacific Fleet, Task Unit 77.4.2 (Taffy II); Atlantic Reserve Fleet (1946-1958)
- Commanders: Rear Admiral Felix Stump
- Operations: Gilbert and Marshall Islands campaign; Western New Guinea campaign; Battle of Leyte Gulf; Battle of Mindoro; Invasion of Iwo Jima; Operation Magic Carpet
- Awards: 7 Battle stars

USS Natoma Bay (CVE–62) was a Casablanca-class escort carrier of the United States Navy that served in the Pacific War during World War II. The carrier entered service in 1943 and participated in a series of operations in the South Pacific including the Philippines campaign, the Battle off Samar and the Battle of Okinawa. During the Okinawa battle, Natoma Bay was struck by a Japanese aircraft and heavily damaged, ending the ship's participation in the war. Once repaired, Natoma Bay was assigned to Operation Magic Carpet, the return of American soldiers from the Pacific theatre. Following the completion of the operation the escort carrier was decommissioned in 1946 and placed in reserve. In 1959, Natoma Bay was sold for scrap.

== Design and description ==
A side profile of the design of Thetis Bay.

Natoma Bay was a Casablanca-class escort carrier, the most numerous type of aircraft carriers ever built. Built to stem heavy losses during the Battle of the Atlantic, they came into service in late 1943, by which time the U-boat threat was already in retreat. Although some did see service in the Atlantic, the majority were utilized in the Pacific, ferrying aircraft, providing logistics support, and conducting close air support for the island-hopping campaigns. The Casablanca-class carriers were built on the standardized Type S4-S2-BB3 hull, a lengthened variant of the Doyen-class hull, and specifically designed to be mass-produced using welded prefabricated sections. This allowed them to be produced at unprecedented speeds: the final ship of her class, Munda, was delivered to the Navy just 101 days after the laying of her keel.

Natoma Bay was 512 ft 3 in (156.13 m) long overall (490 ft (150 m) at the waterline), had a beam of 65 ft 2 in (19.86 m), and a draft of 20 ft 9 in (6.32 m). She displaced 8,188 long tons (8,319 t) standard, which increased to 10,902 long tons (11,077 t) with a full load. To carry out flight operations, the ship had a 257 ft (78 m) hangar deck and a 474 ft (144 m) flight deck. Her compact size necessitated the installation of an aircraft catapult at her bow, and there were two aircraft elevators to facilitate movement of aircraft between the flight and hangar deck: one each fore and aft.

She was powered by four Babcock & Wilcox Express D boilers that raised 285 psi (1,970 kPa) of steam at 577 °F (303 °C). The steam generated by these boilers fed two Skinner Unaflow reciprocating steam engines, delivering 9,000 hp (6,700 kW) to two propeller shafts. This allowed her to reach speeds of 19 kn (35 km/h; 22 mph), with a cruising range of 10,240 nmi (18,960 km; 11,780 mi) at 15 kn (28 km/h; 17 mph). For armament, one 5 in (127 mm)/38 caliber dual-purpose gun was mounted on the stern. Additional anti-aircraft defense was provided by eight Bofors 40 mm (1.57 in) anti-aircraft guns in single mounts and twelve Oerlikon 20 mm (0.79 in) cannons mounted around the perimeter of the deck. By 1945, Casablanca-class carriers had been modified to carry twenty Oerlikon cannons and sixteen Bofors guns; the doubling of the latter was accomplished by putting them into twin mounts. Sensors onboard consisted of a SG surface-search radar and a SK air-search radar.

Although Casablanca-class escort carriers were intended to function with a crew of 860 and an embarked squadron of 50 to 56, the exigencies of wartime often necessitated the inflation of the crew count. They were designed to operate with 27 aircraft, but the hangar deck could accommodate much more during transport or training missions.

== Construction and career ==
She was laid down as Begum (MC hull 1099), on 17 January 1943, by the Kaiser Shipbuilding Co., Inc., Vancouver, Washington, under United States Maritime Commission contract, named Natoma Bay on 22 January 1943, after a bay in the Graham Islands off the southeast coast of Alaska; launched on 20 July 1943; sponsored by Lady Halifax, wife of the United Kingdom's ambassador to the United States; and commissioned on 14 October 1943, Captain Harold L. Meadow in command.

=== 1943–1944 ===
After her shakedown cruise off the California coast, Natoma Bay performed aircraft and personnel ferrying duties between San Diego and Hawaii for Commander Fleet Air, West Coast, until 3 January 1944. Then, with squadron VC-63 embarked, she departed San Diego for Pearl Harbor, reporting to ComCarDiv 24, 5th Amphibious Force, on 10 January. On 23 January she sortied with TG 51.2 for the invasion of the Marshalls. Between 31 January and 7 February, as positions on Majuro Atoll were consolidated, CVE–62 furnished anti-submarine and combat air patrols (CAPs) and area searches for the attack force. On 8 February, she extended her operations to Wotje and Maloelap, alternating for the remainder of the month between those islands and Majuro.

Departing Majuro on 7 March, Natoma Bay reached Espiritu Santo on the 12th. Three days later she joined TF 37 for air strikes and surface bombardments against Kavieng, New Ireland, 19 March – 20 March. She then cruised to the north of the Solomons and New Ireland, providing air cover for convoys to and from Emirau where an air base and a limited naval base were being established. During the next three weeks, she continued to cruise in the Solomons-Bismarck Archipelago area in support of the protracted offensive to neutralize the latter and seal off the Japanese fortress at Rabaul.

On 19 April she rendezvoused with TF 78 and then steamed toward New Guinea where her planes pounded enemy positions in support of a three pronged attack by Allied land and naval forces against Aitape, Hollandia (currently known as Jayapura), and Tanahmerah Bay, 22 April. During and after the landings, Natoma Bay launched protective air patrols and sent fighters and bombers to destroy Japanese installations in the Aitape area. Returning to Manus for engine repairs, 28 April, she sailed 7 May for Pearl Harbor, arriving 18 May.

After loading 37 P-47D Thunderbolt fighters of the Army Air Forces' 19th Fighter Squadron, 318th Fighter Group, Natoma Bay departed Pearl Harbor 5 June en route to the Marianas. Steaming via Eniwetok, she arrived off Saipan on 19 June and was ordered to retire eastward until the Battle of the Philippine Sea was decided. On the 22nd she steamed westward and commenced catapulting the Army planes toward their destination, Aslito Air Field, Saipan. She dispatched 25 on the 22nd and the remainder early on the 23rd, then retired to a refueling area 45 miles east of Saipan.

There the formation came under enemy air attack. Four Aichi "Val" dive bombers dropped their payloads, but no hits were scored; intensive anti-aircraft fire prevented damage to the main targets, Natoma Bay and Manila Bay. The latter ship, with Army fighters still on board, then catapulted those aircraft to provide protective CAP until the radar screens were clear of contacts.

Natoma Bay returned to Eniwetok, 27 June, embarked casualties, and sailed for San Diego, arriving 16 July for availability, logistics and ferry duty. Between 5 September and 14 September she conducted qualification and training exercises for VC-81 (Composite Squadron 81) off Pearl Harbor, and on the 15th, got under way for Manus as a unit of the 3rd Fleet. On 3 October she reached Seeadler Harbor and began final preparations for the invasion of the Philippines.

Assigned to the Escort Carrier Group (TG 77.4), Natoma Bay departed the Admiralties, 12 October, for waters east of the Philippines. After weathering stormy seas, 14–17 October, she commenced offensive flight operations on the 18th. Prior to the invasion, her planes bombed Japanese positions and conducted strafing runs against enemy vehicles and small craft on and around Leyte and Negros. During the amphibious assault on the 20th, she launched ground support, spotting, and air cover strikes. Then, during the critical days following the landings, she sent bombers and fighters to support the ground forces.

On 25 October, as Natoma Bay, flagship of Rear Admiral Stump, CTU 77.4.2 ("Taffy 2"), cruised off the eastern entrance to Leyte Gulf, the Japanese launched a tri-force offensive to drive the Allies from Leyte, and from the Philippines. During the early morning hours, the enemy's Southern Force was soundly defeated in Surigao Strait. Surviving Japanese ships retreated into the Mindanao Sea pursued by destroyers, PT boats, and after sunrise, by carrier based aircraft.

At 06:58, "Taffy 3", (6 CVEs, 3 DDs, and 4 DEs) cruising off Samar under Rear Admiral C. Sprague, was attacked by the vastly more powerful Japanese Center Force (4 BBs, 6 CAs, 2 CLs, 11 DDs) under Admiral Kurita. At 07:01, having ordered all operational planes launched, Adm. Sprague requested any available assistance. Admiral Ozawa's Northern Force, however, had already accomplished its mission – Admiral Halsey's TF 38 had been drawn off to the north. The cruisers and battleships under Admiral Oldendorf were replenishing after their battle in Surigao Strait. Help could only come from the south. At 07:02, "Taffy 2", 20 miles to the south-south-east, responded and by 07:08 all available planes were en route. Those already dispatched on routine missions were recalled.

Ordered not to concentrate on any particular ship, but to cripple as many as possible, planes from Natoma Bay conducted two strikes against the enemy within an hour and a half. At 09:26 a third strike, with 500 pound SAP bombs in lieu of torpedoes, was launched. At 11:18, a fourth strike was sent off to push the maneuvering enemy away from Leyte Gulf, but with neither torpedoes nor armor-piercing bombs aboard, the planes took off carrying only general-purpose bombs and depth charges. At noon, Natoma Bay's fighters, launched previously for CAP, were landed, rearmed and sent up again. At 12:56 and at 15:08, the 5th and 6th strikes were launched to further pursue the enemy as it retreated toward San Bernardino Strait. Fighter planes, armed with 250-pound (113 kg) general-purpose bombs, were among those dispatched with the last strike.

At the end of the day's operations, TG 77.4, with "Taffy 3" bearing the brunt of the damage, had turned back the Japanese Force. The escort carrier group was praised for having "...accomplished a task that only a large carrier task force should be expected to undertake..." Natoma Bay's contribution to this included one heavy cruiser sunk, one torpedo plane shot down, and hits on one battleship, three heavy cruisers, two light cruisers and one destroyer.

The following morning, 26 October, Natoma Bay's planes, continuing to pound the enemy, assisted in the sinking of a light cruiser and her accompanying destroyer in the Visayan Sea and then resumed support of ground forces on Leyte. On the 27th, her fighters strafed Japanese vessels in Ormoc Bay and then swung over Samar where they downed a Kawasaki Ki-61 "Tony". A Mitsubishi G3M "Nell" was bagged on the 28th, and on 30 October the CVE sailed for Seeadler Harbor, arriving 4 November.

Natoma Bay got underway for Kossol Roads 27 November and departed from there 10 December to provide air cover for the Mindoro invasion convoys as they transited the Mindanao and Sulu Seas. On the 13th, kamikazes from Negros Island attacked the formation. Eleven were shot down, but three pressed home the attack. Two were downed by anti-aircraft fire, but the third scored on the destroyer Haraden. Japanese aerial attacks continued on the 14th and Natoma Bay’s fighters added seven A6M Zeros to their total.

During and after the Mindoro landings, 15 December, Natoma Bay provided air cover and ground support, protecting screening vessels from kamikazes and strafing Japanese positions. After recovering her planes on the 16th, she retired to Kossol Roads, thence to Manus, returning to the Palaus at the end of the month.

=== 1945 ===
On 1 January 1945, Natoma Bay, reassigned to CARDIV 25, sortied once again with ships of an attack force, the target this time, Luzon. There, after battling enemy nuisance and suicide raiders en route, she, with five other CVEs, provided air cover for the Bombardment and Fire Support Group prior to the landings, and direct air support ahead of the amphibious troops after the assault in the San Fabian area. Between the 10th and the 17th her continuous direct air support missions resulted in the damage and destruction of bridges, fuel and ammunition dumps, barracks, roads and vehicles.

After replenishment at Mindoro, Natoma Bay cruised west of Mindoro until the 29th. She then moved into position to support amphibious landings on the west coast of Zambales Province and at Subic Bay, remaining there until 1 February. Her task group, 77.4, then retired, reaching Ulithi on the 5th.

She sortied 10 February with TU 52.2.1, to provide air cover en route to and during the Iwo Jima assault. Between the 16th and the 19th, her planes flew 123 sorties to prepare the way for the assault marines. On D-day, 19 February, 36 sorties provided direct support, while another 16 provided CAP cover. After the 19th, Natoma Bay expanded her duties to include antisubmarine and air coordinator missions, and in March, to anti-shipping assignments.

Natoma Bay departed the Volcano-Bonin area 8 March, entering Ulithi Lagoon on the 11th. There squadron VC-9 replaced VC-81 and by the 21st, was ready for Natoma Bay's next operation, Okinawa. With TU 52.1.1, the escort carrier provided air cover for the pre-invasion bombardment and Occupation of Kerama Retto, 24 March – 1 April. She then shifted her attention to Okinawa itself. For the next three months except for brief repair periods, her planes bombed and strafed strategic and tactical targets; flew observation and spotting, photographic and propaganda missions; dropped provisions and munitions in advance areas; and conducted combat air and anti-submarine patrols.

At 06:35, 7 June, after having maneuvered through typhoon weather, Natoma Bay was closed by a Zero, broad on the port quarter and low on the water. Changing course, it came in over the stern, fired incendiary ammunition at the bridge, and on reaching the island structure, nosed over and crashed the flight deck. The engine, propeller and a bomb tore a hole in the flight deck, 12 by 20 feet (3.7 by 6.1 m), while the explosion of the bomb damaged the deck of the forecastle and the anchor windlass beyond repair and ignited a nearby fighter. Three of Natoma Bay's crew and one officer of VC–9 were wounded. One ship's officer was killed. A second Zero was splashed by the ship's port batteries. The damage control party immediately extinguished the blaze and set about emergency repairs. The next strike was cancelled, but the following one, against Miayako Shima, took place as scheduled at 10:30.

=== Post-war activities ===
On 20 June the escort carrier headed for Guam for partial repairs, then continued on to the United States. By 19 August, when she arrived in San Diego, the war was over. During September and October she underwent repairs, alterations and general overhaul, after which she reported for duty as a "Magic Carpet" transport. During November and early December she carried servicemen from the Philippines to California, then after detachment, 29 December, she was transferred to the Atlantic Reserve Fleet.

=== Decommissioning and disposal ===
Reporting 20 February 1946, she decommissioned 20 May, berthing at Norfolk. In October 1949, she was reassigned to the Boston Reserve Group. Reclassified CVU–62 on 12 June 1955, she was declared unfit for further service in 1958 and her name was struck from the Naval Vessel Register on 1 September. She was sold on 30 July 1959 for scrap to the Japanese.

== Awards ==
Natoma Bay earned seven battle stars for her World War II service on the Asiatic-Pacific theater medal and two bronze stars on the Philippine Liberation medal. Natoma Bay also earned a Presidential Unit Citation, taking part in 13 operations in World War II, not including the Battle of Leyte Gulf.
