= Micaiah (disambiguation) =

Micaiah may refer to any of these:

== People ==
- Micaiah, the son of Imlah
- Micaiah Towgood, an author
- Micaiah Diondae "Dion" Glover, an American professional basketball player
- Michaiah Shobek (born James Michael Shoffner), American serial killer

== Fictional characters ==
- Micaiah (Fire Emblem), one of the main characters in Fire Emblem: Radiant Dawn

== See also ==
- Micajah
- Micah (disambiguation)
