= Micah Hilton =

Personal information
- Date of birth: 2 October 1985 (age 41)
- Place of birth: Plymouth, Montserrat
- Position: Goalkeeper

Team information
- Current team: P.C. United FC

Senior career*
Years	Team	Apps	(Gls)
2009–	P.C. United FC		

International career^{‡}
2010–	Montserrat	3	(0)
- * Club domestic league appearances and goals as of 06:14, 8 November 2013 (UTC) ‡ National team caps and goals as of 06:14, 8 November 2013 (UTC)

Micah Hilton (born 2 October 1985) is a football goalkeeper in Montserrat who plays for P.C. United FC. He has made three appearances for the Montserrat national team.

== Career ==
=== Club career ===
Hilton played for P.C. United FC in the Montserrat Championship from 2009.

=== International career ===
His first international appearance came on 10 June 2010 in a Caribbean Cup qualifying match against Saint Vincent & the Grenadines which, despite some brave keeping from Hilton, ended in a 7–0 defeat. Despite this defeat, Hilton retained his place for the match against Barbados two days later, in which he conceded a further five goals, as a result of which, he lost his place to Jermaine Sweeney.

Hilton's third international appearance came in a World Cup qualification match against Belize on 15 June 2011; this match ended in a 5–2 defeat, allowing Sweeney to reclaim his place.
