= USS Straub =

Cannon-class destroyer escort

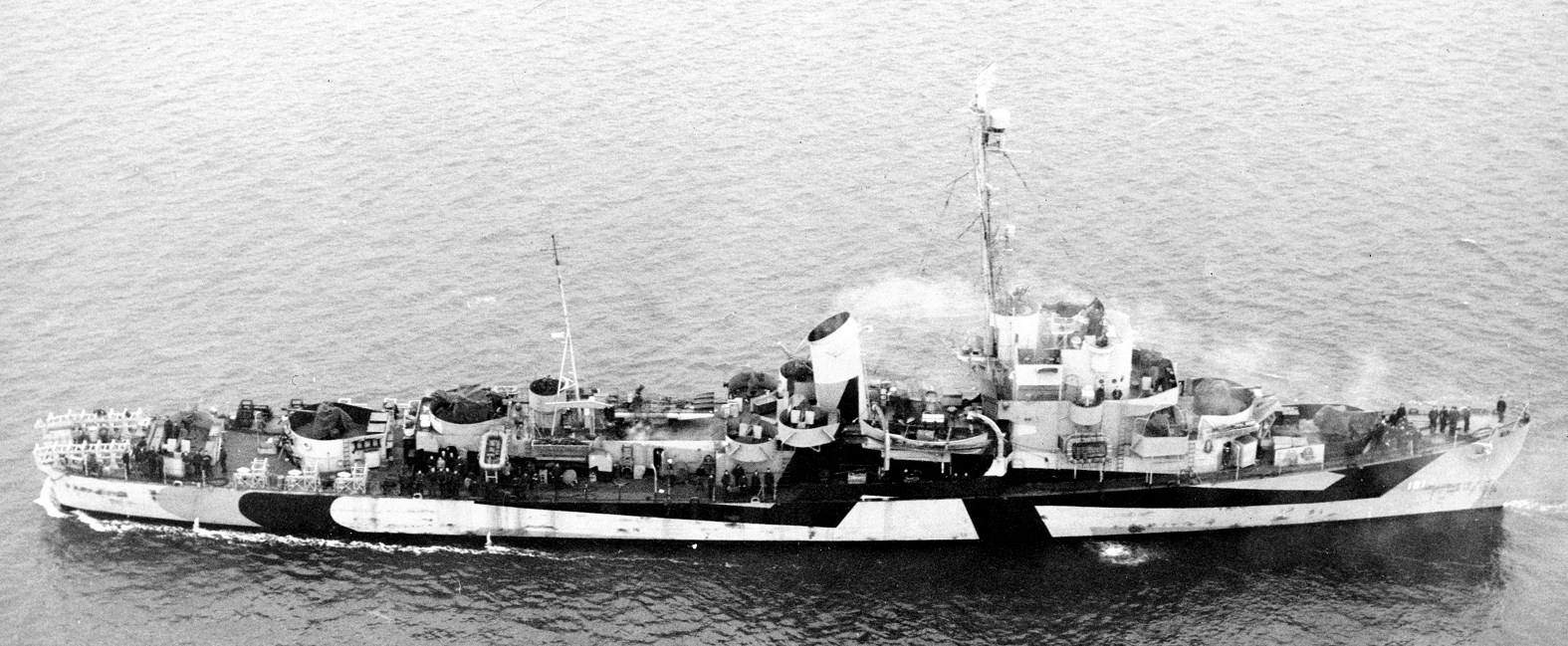

History

United States
- Name: USS Straub
- Builder: Federal Shipbuilding and Drydock Company, Newark, New Jersey
- Laid down: 7 June 1943
- Launched: 19 September 1943
- Commissioned: 25 October 1943
- Decommissioned: 17 October 1947
- Stricken: 1 August 1973
- Fate: Sold for scrap, 17 July 1974

General characteristics
- Class & type: Cannon-class destroyer escort
- Displacement: 1,240 long tons (1,260 t) standard; 1,620 long tons (1,646 t) full
- Length: 306 ft (93 m) o/a; 300 ft (91 m) w/l
- Beam: 36 ft 10 in (11.23 m)
- Draft: 11 ft 8 in (3.56 m)
- Propulsion: 4 × GM Mod. 16-278A diesel engines with electric drive, 6,000 shp (4,474 kW), 2 screws
- Speed: 21 knots (39 km/h; 24 mph)
- Range: 10,800 nmi (20,000 km) at 12 kn (22 km/h; 14 mph)
- Complement: 15 officers and 201 enlisted
- Armament: 3 × single Mk.22 3"/50 caliber guns; 1 × twin 40 mm Mk.1 AA gun; 8 × 20 mm Mk.4 AA guns; 3 × 21-inch (533 mm) torpedo tubes; 1 × Hedgehog Mk.10 anti-submarine mortar (144 rounds); 8 × Mk.6 depth charge projectors; 2 × Mk.9 depth charge tracks

USS Straub (DE-181) was a Cannon-class destroyer escort in service with the United States Navy from 1943 to 1947. She was sold for scrap in 1974.

== History ==
USS Straub was laid down on 7 June 1943 by the Federal Shipbuilding and Dry Dock Co., at Newark, New Jersey. Sponsored by Mrs. Margaret H. Straub, the escort was launched on 19 September and commissioned on 25 October 1943 at the Brooklyn Navy Yard.

=== Battle of the Atlantic ===
Straub remained in New York City until 11 November, then departed for Great Sound Bay, Bermuda, and shakedown. The shakedown exercises in waters around Bermuda lasted for approximately one month, and Straub returned to New York on 13 December. There she joined elements of Convoy UGS-28, escorted them to Norfolk, Virginia, and thence across the Atlantic as far as the Azores. The convoy arrived at Bahia Angra, Terceira, Azores, on 8 January 1944; and Straub conducted antisubmarine patrols among the islands until detached on 16 January to join Task Group TG 21.11 in screening escort aircraft carrier Mission Bay (CVE-59) to Casablanca.

The task group made Casablanca on 25 January and, the same day, Straub began her voyage home. She arrived at New York on 6 February and began a period of availability which lasted until her embarkation on the 20th for Recife, Pernambuco, Brazil. As a part of the antisubmarine screen of Task Group TG 27.2, she was reunited with Mission Bay as escort to her and Wake Island (CVE-65). The task group called at Recife, where Straub reported for duty with the U.S. 4th Fleet, and then moved on to Rio de Janeiro, entering port on the 7th. Straub was detached the next day and steamed out of Rio de Janeiro bound for Montevideo, Uruguay.

Straub put in at Rio Grande do Sul, Brazil, for three days and, instead of making for Montevideo, visited Bahia, Brazil, from 17 to 28 March. From there, she put to sea and joined TG 41.6 on the 31st. Led by escort carrier Solomons (CVE-67), Straub and the rest of TG 41.6 plied the ocean searching for enemy submarines until 12 April. The task group returned to Recife for two days and sortied on 14 April for another U-boat hunt. This second patrol, on 14 to 30 April, and the third, from 4 to 20 May, were both fruitless. After an 11-day repair period at Recife, Straub exited the harbor with TG 41.6 on 31 May 1944 for their fourth patrol.

At the end of two weeks of quiet cruising, Straub picked up a report of a submarine sighting sent by one of Solomons' pilots. In company with Herzog (DE-178), she sped off to the U-boat's reported position to initiate a box search and engage the marauder if possible. In the meantime, six other planes found the submarine, attacked, and sank her. That evening, Straub entered the area of the sinking to pick up survivors. She was able to recover the submarine's commanding officer, her executive officer, and 18 other crewmen. Late that night, she was forced by darkness to give up the search for Lt. (jg.) Chamberlain, the pilot whose depth charges had finished off both the U-boat and his own aircraft. The prisoners were transferred to Solomons on the next day, 16 June, and TG 41.6 returned to Recife on the 23rd.

Straub continued patrols with Solomons and TG 41.6 until 22 August. At that time, she joined TG 41.7 and carrier Tripoli (CVE-64) and patrolled out of Recife for U-boats until sailing for New York on 15 November. The escort remained in New York from 26 November to 27 December. She then moved via Key West, Florida, to Trinidad. There, between 11 and 30 January 1945, she participated in various tests and exercises.

Returning to Recife on 30 January, she stayed in that port until 5 February when she got underway to escort Omaha (CL-4) on an official visit to Montevideo, Uruguay. Straub escorted her back to Recife between 22 and 28 March and sailed the next day for New York, arriving on 8 April. Following a week's availability at New York, she set sail for Casco Bay, Maine, where she arrived on 15 April. From there, Straub set out for antisubmarine patrols in which she was engaged until 8 May. On that date, the escort reported at New London, Connecticut, for two weeks' duty as a target ship for submarine exercises off New London.

Moving from New London to Norfolk, Virginia, Straub joined convoy UGS-94 as part of its antisubmarine screen. She sailed with the convoy all the way to Mers El Kébir, Algeria, and, after stopping along the way at Horta in the Azores, returned to the United States on 19 June 1945. She underwent repairs at Boston, Massachusetts, from 19 June to 25 July and, after exercises out of Guantanamo Bay, Cuba, sailed westward. She transited the Panama Canal on 13 and 14 August and arrived in San Diego, California, on the 24th. During her passage from Panama, Japan capitulated.

=== Pacific War ===
Three days later, she sailed from San Diego, rendezvoused with Wisconsin (BB-64), and escorted her to Hawaii. Upon arrival in Pearl Harbor on 4 September 1945, Straub was employed in various patrols and as an escort to carriers conducting flight operations. On 4 November, she was assigned duty as a weather station vessel in the Hawaii area. She spent just over two months alternating between Pearl Harbor and weather station duty.

=== Decommissioning and fate ===
Straub weighed anchor on 12 January 1946, transited the Panama Canal on 26 and 27 January, and arrived at New York on 1 February. At the completion of pre-inactivation overhaul, she sailed from New York on 20 February bound for Green Cove Springs, Florida, and there remained with the Atlantic Reserve Fleet until October 1958 when she was shifted to Charleston, South Carolina. Straub was struck from the Navy List on 1 August 1973, sold on 17 July 1974 and subsequently scrapped.

== Trivia ==
A semi-fictional "DE-181" was portrayed in the 1957 film The Enemy Below, starring Robert Mitchum and Curd Jürgens. Named Haynes in the film, she was portrayed by the Buckley-class destroyer escort Whitehurst (DE-634). Stock footage of the Straub was used in an episode of Wonder Woman, The Bermuda Triangle Crisis. It also appeared briefly in an episode of "The Bionic Woman" of part III, Kill Oscar Goldman. USS Straub also starred in the TV show 12 O' Clock High in the 1967 Season 3 Episode 17 "The Hunters and The Killers".
