= Micajah Burnett =

American architect

Brother Micajah Burnett
- Born: May 13, 1791; Patrick County, Virginia, United States
- Died: January 10, 1879 (aged 87); Pleasant Hill, Kentucky, United States
- Occupations: Architect; builder; engineer; town planner
- Years active: 1813–1872
- Organization: Pleasant Hill Shaker Society

Micajah Burnett (13 May 1791 – 10 January 1879) was an American Shaker architect, builder, engineer, surveyor, mathematician, and town planner.

== Early life ==
Burnett was born on 13 May 1791 in Patrick County, Virginia, United States. He was the oldest of four children, the others being Charity, Andrew, and Zachiah. By the mid-1790s, his family had settled in Wayne County, Kentucky. In 1808, his parents converted to Shakerism and joined the Pleasant Hill Shaker Society with their four children. Burnett was 17 at the time.

== Adulthood and architecture ==
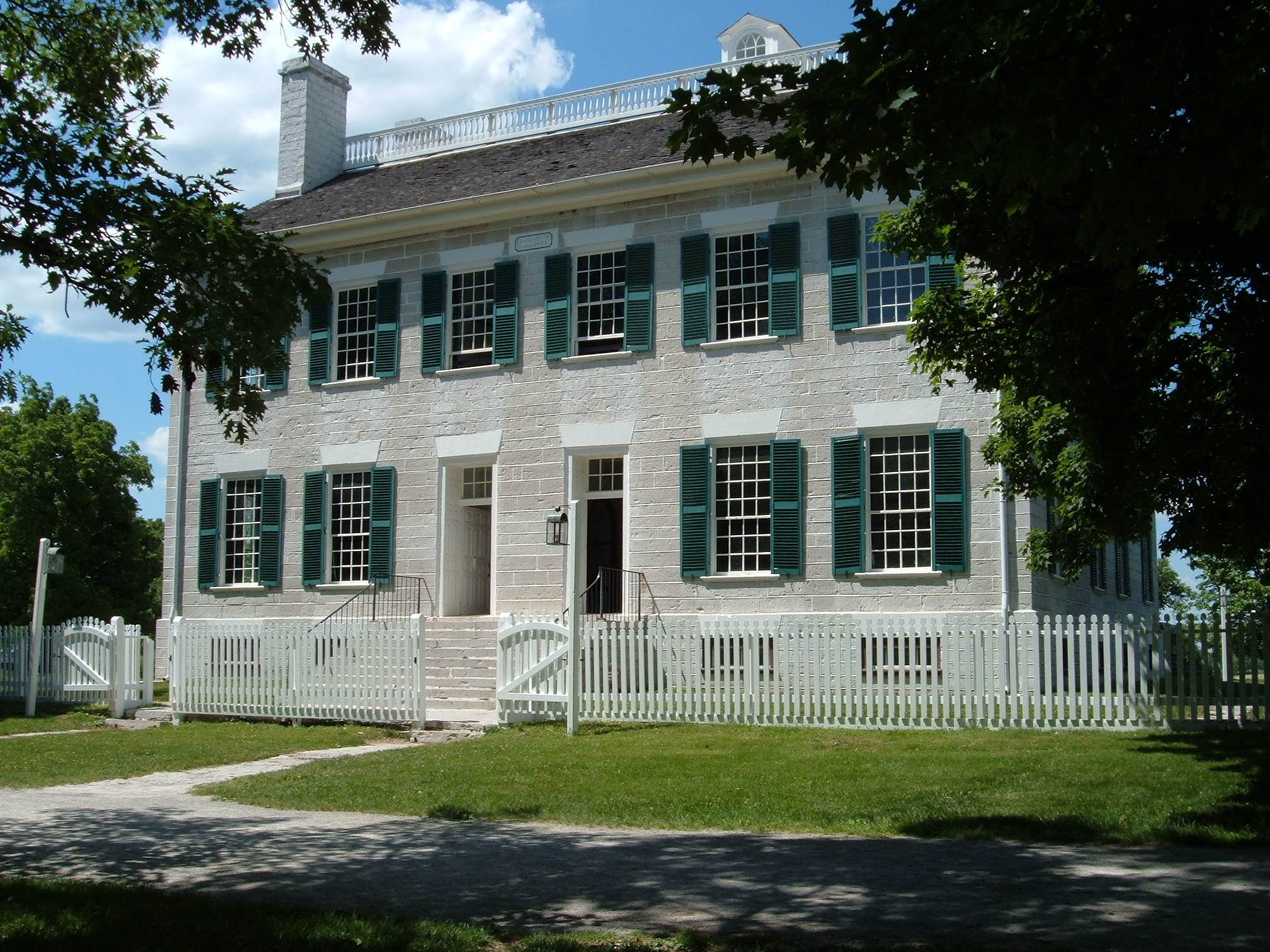
The Pleasant Hill Center Family dwelling house, designed by Burnett and constructed from 1824 to 1834

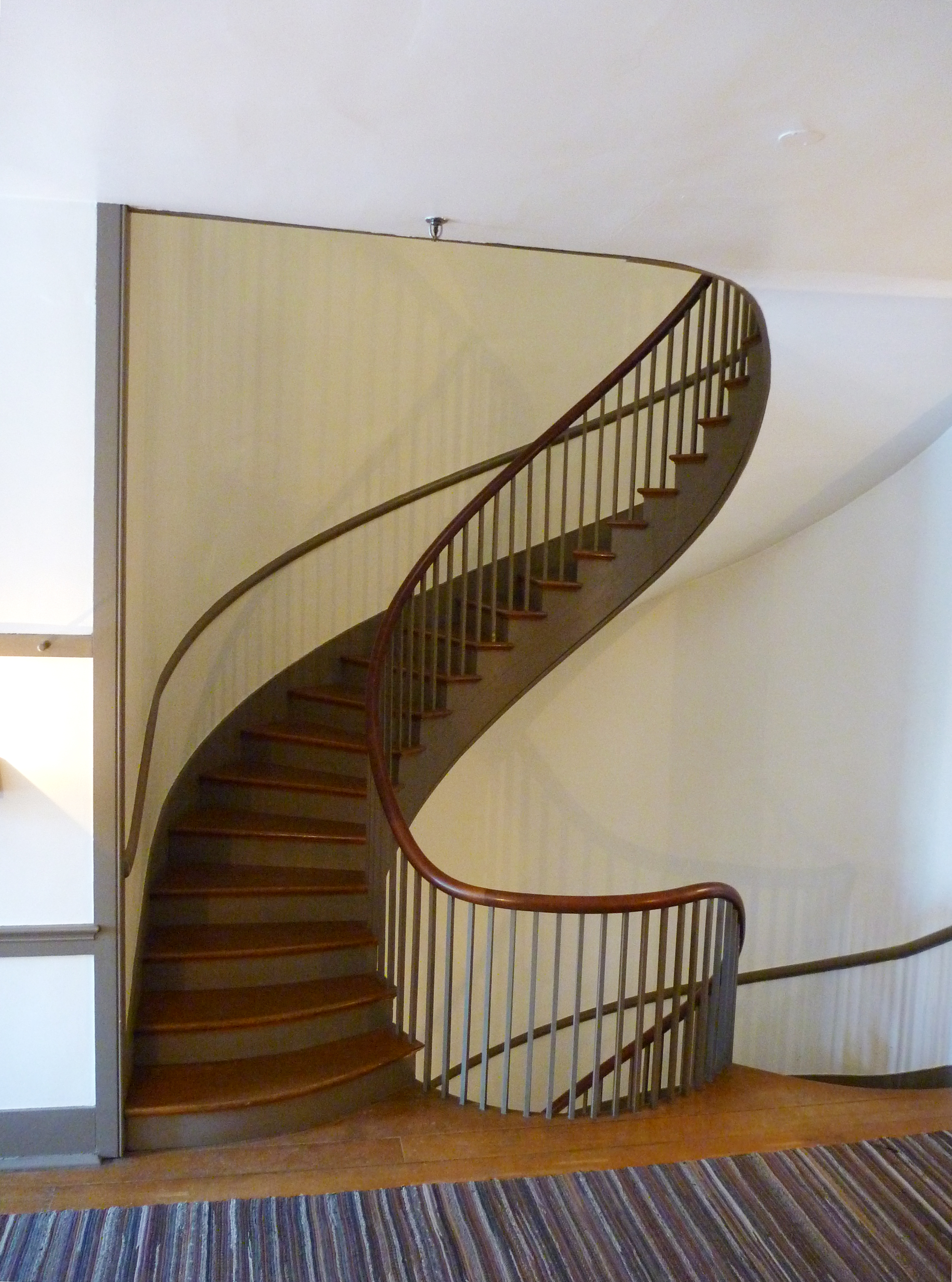
One of two spiral staircases designed by Burnett in the Trustees' House

At the age of 22, Burnett changed the original layout of Pleasant Hill, much of which was on a north–south axis. He reoriented the main road to run east–west, and designed and oversaw the construction of three new dwelling houses along it. The first two were brick structures home to the East and West Families, built in 1817 and 1821, respectively. The third, construction of which began in 1824 and ended ten years later, was the dwelling of the Center Family. Built of white limestone, the building is 55 by 60 feet with an ell of 34 by 85 feet. Besides the three dwellings, Burnett designed the Pleasant Hill Shakers' Meeting House in 1820. A white clapboard structure, it is 60 by 44 feet.

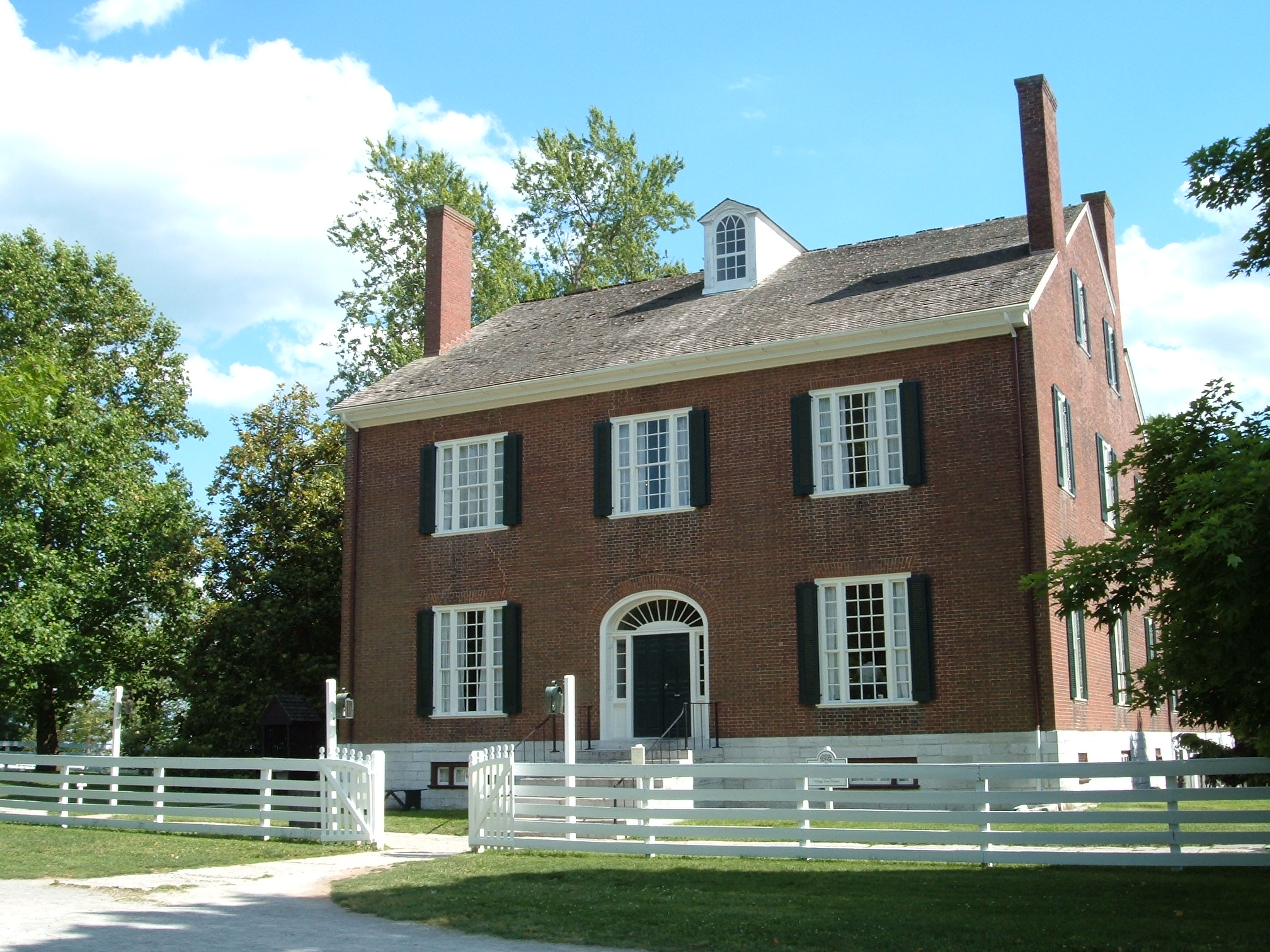
The Pleasant Hill Trustees' House, designed by Burnett and built in 1839–40

During the early 1830s, Burnett directed the construction of the first public waterworks west of the Allegheny Mountains. Part of the project included the erection of Pleasant Hill's water tower, which Burnett designed. Completed in 1831, the tower holds a cypress tank with a capacity of 4,400 gallons of water.

The tower allowed every dwelling, shop, and barn in the Shaker village to have access to running water. Burnett's expertise in engineering and designing waterworks was such that he was consulted by Shakers at the South Union Shaker Society when they were designing their own waterworks.

While Burnett's many designs and completed buildings awarded him renown both among Shakers and outside groups, his most famous project was that of the Pleasant Hill Trustees' House. A large brick building, it was built from 1839 to 1840 and is best known for its twin spiral staircases, which have the appearance of standing unsupported.

In addition to his design and construction work, Burnett also had the important job of trustee, which took him to markets across the Mississippi River area selling Shaker good including seeds, brooms, medicinal herbs, raw silk, and fruit preserves. To provide better access to the Kentucky River from Pleasant Hill, he designed and oversaw the construction of a new road. In his later years, he also designed and oversaw the construction of the Pleasant Hill West Family's wash house, the West Family Sisters' Shop, the East Family Brethren's Shop, and the Pleasant Hill U.S. Post Office.

In 1872, because of his old age, Burnett was released from his trustee duties. He died on 10 January 1879 at the age of 87.

== Gallery ==
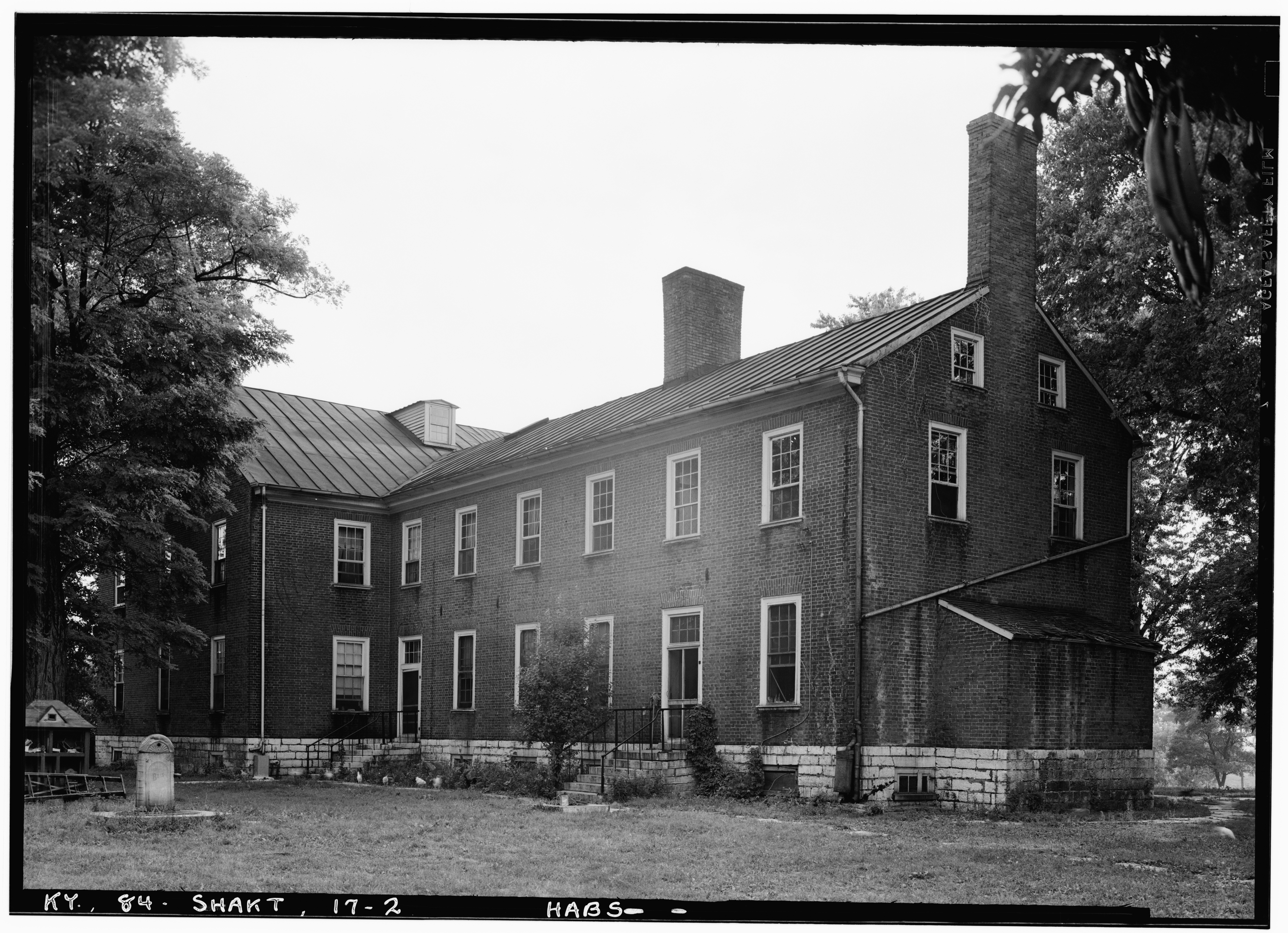

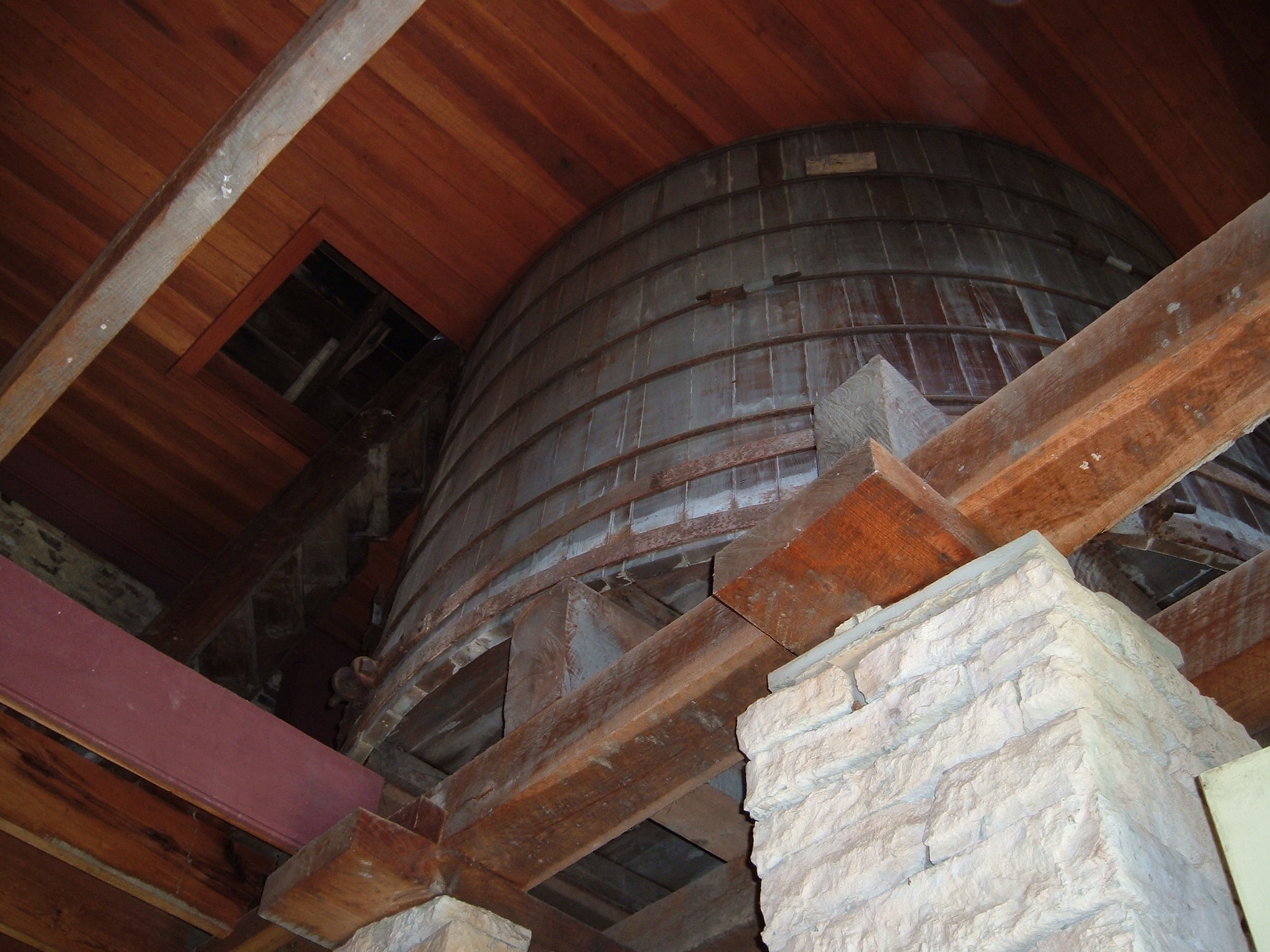

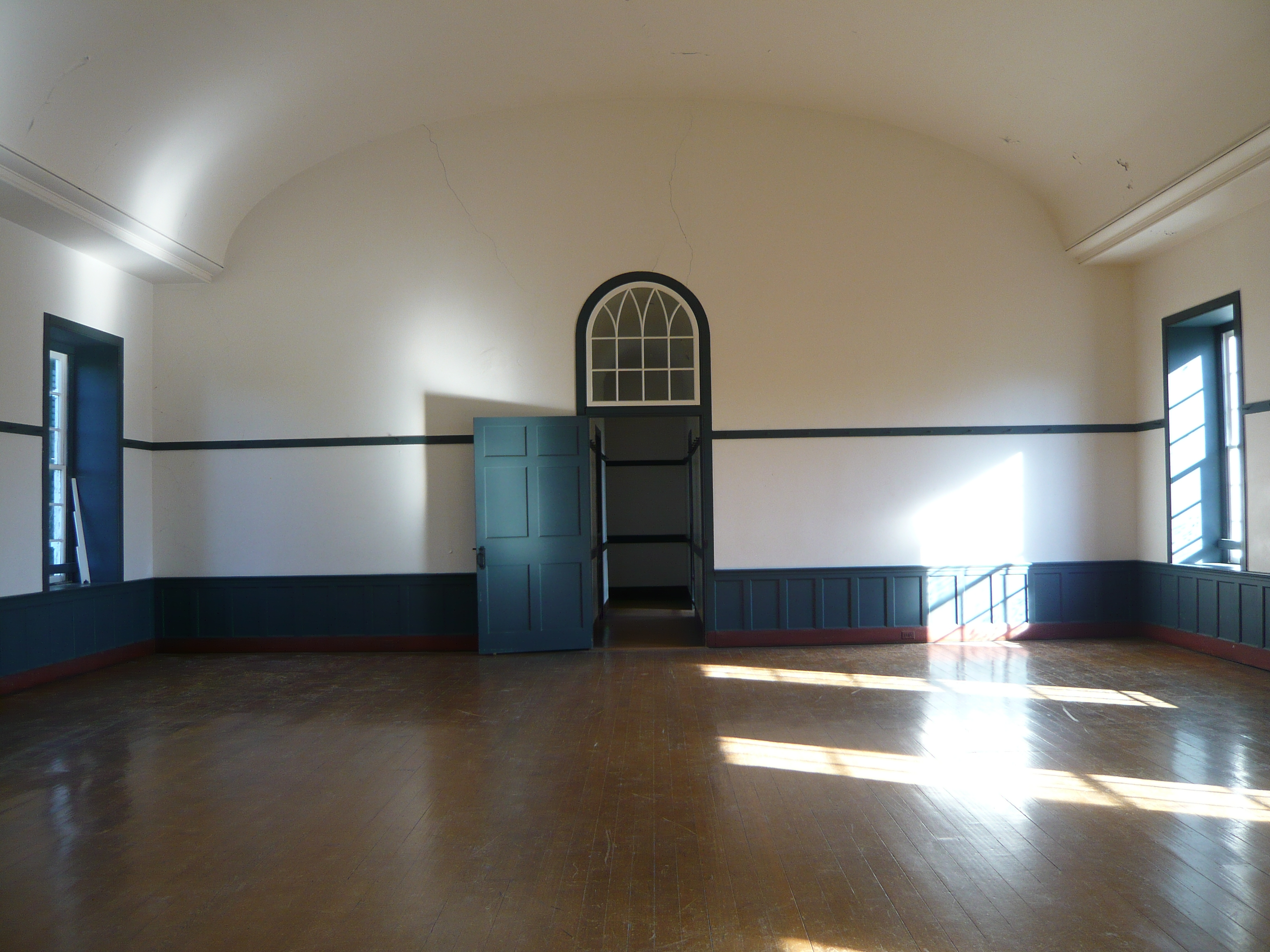
