= Micah Challenge UK =

- Type: Anti-poverty coalition
- Purpose: Mobilising Christians against global poverty
- Location: Kennington, London
- Website: www.micahchallenge.org.uk

Micah Challenge UK is a coalition of Christian development agencies, organisations, churches and groups, mobilising UK Christians against global poverty. As one of 39 campaigns worldwide it forms part of the wider international Micah Challenge movement of Christians seeking to hold governments to account to see that the Millennium Development Goals are met by 2015 at which point, at which point the organisation formally closed down.

Since the closure of Micah Challenge UK, some successor groups and initiatives have emerged within the UK Christian development sector to continue advocacy on poverty-related issues aligned with the Sustainable Development Goals (SDGs) that followed the MDGs in 2015. However, there is no active Micah Challenge UK campaign as of 2025.

== History ==
UK representatives of Tearfund and the General Director of the UK Evangelical Alliance, put together a proposal to focus the combined strength of the WEA and the Micah Network through a global advocacy campaign. This proposal pitched to a meeting of the Micah Network in Seattle in 2003, was accepted and the concept of Micah Challenge was born.

Micah Challenge was launched globally on 15 October 2004 by the World Evangelical Alliance (WEA) and the Micah Network of Christian relief and development agencies, timed to coincide with the UN International Day for the Eradication of Poverty. Approximately 11 national campaigns were launched around the world during that year, and this number has steadily increased until by the end of 2006 Micah Challenge was present in 36 countries in both the global south and the global north.

Whilst the UK campaign was launched on 15 October 2004 alongside the international launch, levels of activity and resourcing remained low initially as the Make Poverty History campaign was in full flow in the UK at this time. With Christians and Christian agencies playing such a full part in the campaign, the decision was taken that Micah Challenge's time had not yet come in the UK. It was not until 22 May 2006 the Micah Challenge UK Board of Directors met for the first time.

By the end of 2006 an executive team with a number of working groups were meeting regularly in addition to the UK Board of Directors. In addition, churches around the country for the first time marked international Micah Sunday on 15 October 2006. Towards the end of the year, extra full-time staff were added to the Micah Challenge UK secretariat, and activity built towards the summer 2007 Blow the Whistle campaign, which was Micah Challenge UK's entry onto the public stage.

== Aims ==
Micah Challenge is inspired by the Old Testament prophet Micah who challenged God's people to act justly, to love mercy and to walk humbly with their God (Micah 6:8). Micah Challenge UK is working to encourage Christians to be a prophetic voice that cries out for justice for the poor, like the prophet Micah did in his day. Micah Challenge UK has two aims:

1. To galvanise Christians in the UK towards greater practical and political engagement with the issues and injustices of poverty
2. To unite Christians to ensure the UK honours its commitments to the achievement of the Millennium Development Goals by 2015

== Campaigns ==
In June 2007 thousands of Christians made a deafening demand for justice by blowing whistles in a call to G8 leaders to keep their promises to the poor. The Blow the Whistle campaign focused on calling on the Government to honour its commitments set in the Millennium Development Goals, aimed to halve global poverty by 2015. The summer of 2007 marked the halfway point, so Micah Challenge made a point to assess the halftime scores.

Around 850 people took part in a worship service held at Methodist Central Hall including representatives of some of the world's poorest nations. The worshippers then joined The World Can’t Wait rally where people with placards lined both sides of the banks of the Thames as whistles were blown, car horns were honked and alarms went off to make a deafening signal to the government that the world can't wait to end poverty. As a result of the campaign almost 25,000 Blow the Whistle postcards reached the UK Prime Minister's desk.

In 2010, Micah Challenge UK led the What's Your Promise campaign, where thousands of Christians in Churches across the UK made promises to live lives that remember the poor. They did this by writing on handprints, which symbolised a commitment and, like the promises made, they are unique. These promises were then delivered to local MPs who were asked to make a promise themselves. Over 11,000 promises were made, and 35 MPs were presented with handprints. Half of these MPs were inspired to make a promise of their own. A number of people said that making their promise helped change their way of thinking and their actions in the world.

Post-2015, there have been no major new campaigns run under the Micah Challenge UK name, as the organisation concluded its mission with the MDGs. Some affiliated agencies continue advocacy work under new frameworks related to the Sustainable Development Goals (SDGs).
