= Micah Hyde =

Micah Hyde may refer to:

- Micah Hyde (footballer) (born 1974), English-born Jamaican footballer
- Micah Hyde (American football) (born 1990), American football safety
