= Micah Franklin =

Micah Franklin may refer to:

- Micah Franklin (baseball) (born 1972), American baseball player
- Micah Franklin (squash player) (born 1992), Bermudian squash player
