= Volgoprombank =

Russian bank

- Industry: Banking, Financial services
- Founded: 1990
- Headquarters: Volgograd, Russia

Volgoprombank was a Russian private bank, based in Volgograd in the Volga region. In November 2007, the bank principal shareholder (95%), Russian MP and businessman Oleg Mikheyev, sold its stake to Promsvyazbank's main shareholders, brothers Alexey and Dmitry Ananyev In May 2009, Mikheyev has sued prominent business daily Kommersant for $217 million claiming that one of the newspaper's article had spoiled the bank reputation at the time he sold the bank and forced him to sell his shares at a disadvantageous price.

== See also ==
- List of banks in Russia
