= Vitaliy Mikheyev =

Ukrainian strongman

Personal information
- Born: Віталій Міхеєв Vyshneve, Ukraine

Sport
- Sport: Strongman competitions
Medal record
Representing Ukraine
Ukraine's Strongest Man
3rd	2010
2nd	2012
3rd	2013
Irpin Strongman Cup
4th	2011
Hatne Strongest Cup
1st	2011
Krinica Minsk Strongman Cup
2nd	2014

Vitaliy Mikheyev (Ukrainian: Віталій Міхеєв), is a Ukrainian strongman competitor.

In 2009 began his career as a strongman.

Vice-Champion of Europe Arnold Classic Strongman
