= Mica, Virginia =

Unincorporated community in Virginia, United States

Coordinates: 38°08′26″N 77°21′20″W

Mica is an unincorporated community in Caroline County, in the U.S. state of Virginia.
