= VC-9 =

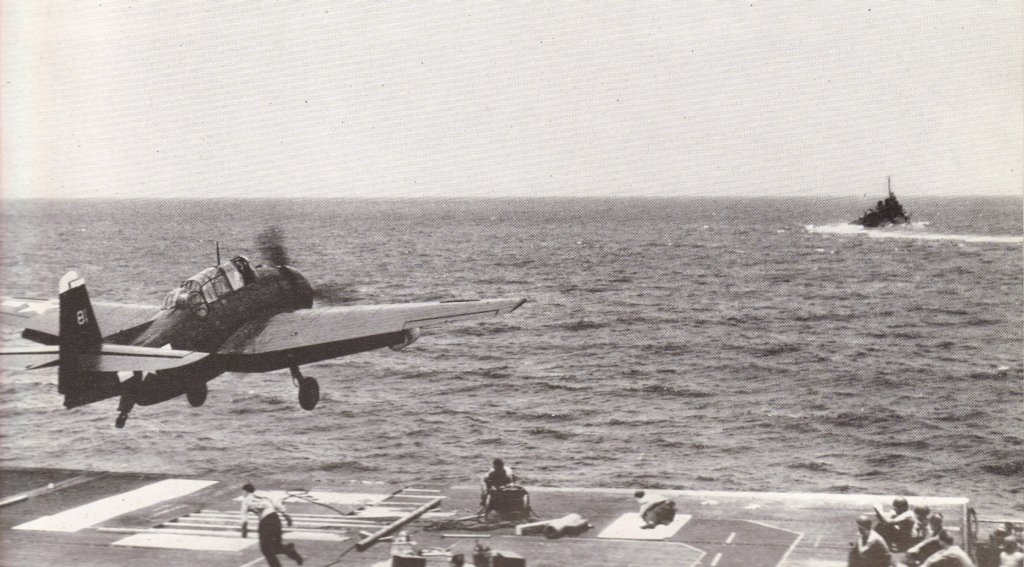
- Grumman TBM-3E Avenger torpedo bomber of squadron VC-9 taking off from the escort carrier USS Natoma Bay (CVE-62), 7 June 1945
- Active: 1942–1945
- Country: United States
- Branch: United States Navy
- Role: Anti-submarine warfare
- Decorations: 3 Presidential Unit Citations

Aircraft flown
- Bomber: Grumman TBF Avenger
- Fighter: Grumman F4F Wildcat

VC-9 (Composite Squadron Nine) was an aircraft squadron of the United States Navy. It was stationed aboard USS Bogue (CVE-9), and USS Card (CVE-11), both of which served part of World War II in the North Atlantic. VC-9 also served aboard the USS Natoma Bay (CVE-62) and took part in the battle of Okinawa. The squadron was decommissioned in 1945 at Arlington, Washington.
