= USS Herzog =

Cannon-class destroyer escort

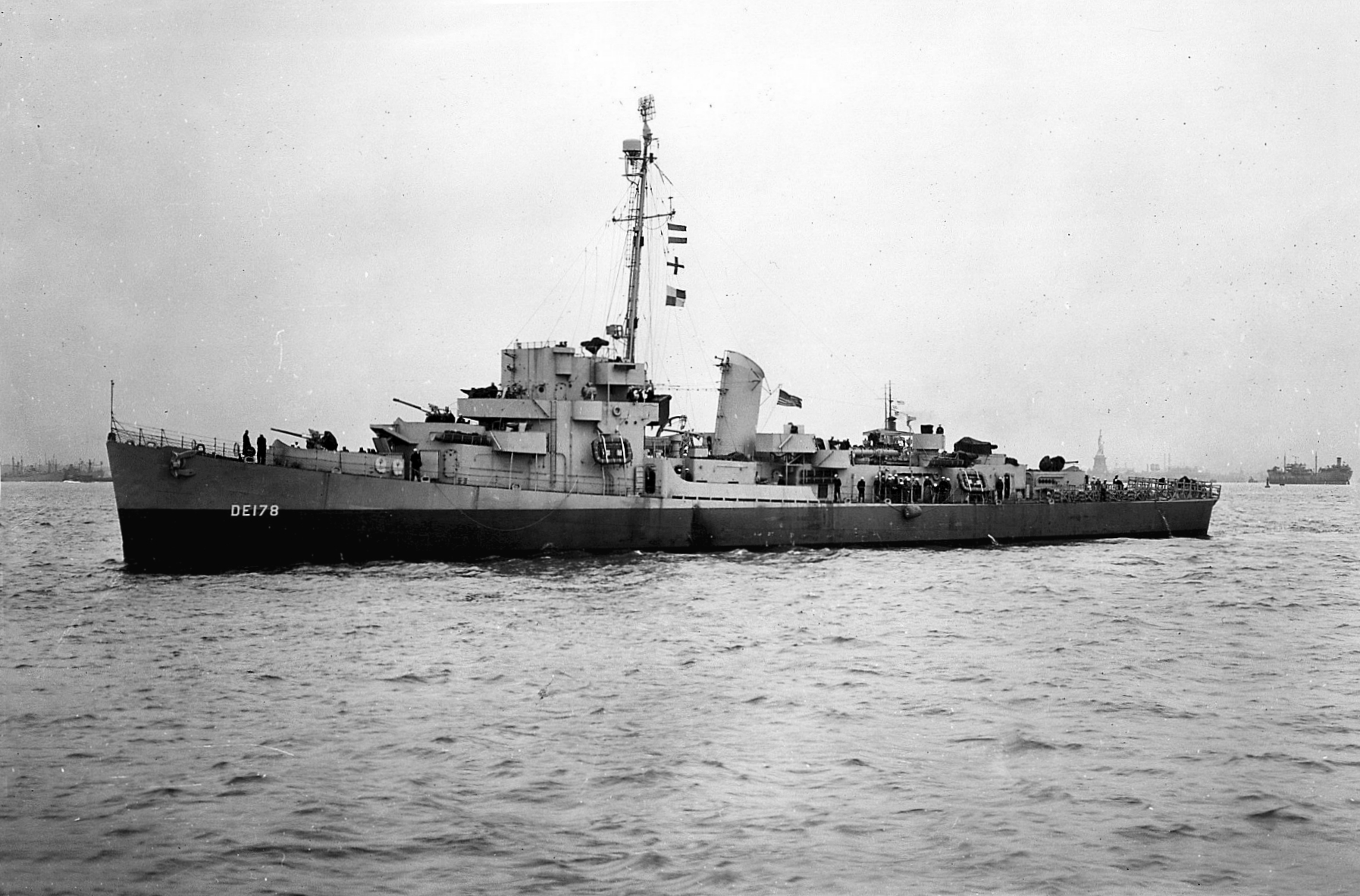

History

United States
- Name: USS Herzog
- Namesake: William Ralph Herzog
- Builder: Federal Shipbuilding and Drydock Company, Newark, New Jersey
- Laid down: 17 May 1943
- Launched: 5 September 1943
- Commissioned: 6 October 1943
- Decommissioned: 1 August 1944
- Stricken: 20 July 1953
- Fate: Leased to Brazil, 1 August 1944; Transferred to Brazil, 30 June 1953

History

Brazil
- Name: Beberibe (D-19)
- Acquired: 1 August 1944
- Stricken: 1968
- Fate: Ran aground, February 1966; Scrapped, 1968

General characteristics
- Class & type: Cannon-class destroyer escort
- Displacement: 1,240 long tons (1,260 t) standard; 1,620 long tons (1,646 t) full
- Length: 306 ft (93 m) o/a; 300 ft (91 m) w/l
- Beam: 36 ft 10 in (11.23 m)
- Draft: 11 ft 8 in (3.56 m)
- Propulsion: 4 × GM Mod. 16-278A diesel engines with electric drive, 6,000 shp (4,474 kW), 2 screws
- Speed: 21 knots (39 km/h; 24 mph)
- Range: 10,800 nmi (20,000 km) at 12 kn (22 km/h; 14 mph)
- Complement: 15 officers and 201 enlisted
- Armament: 3 × single Mk.22 3"/50 caliber guns; 1 × twin 40 mm Mk.1 AA gun; 8 × 20 mm Mk.4 AA guns; 3 × 21 inch (533 mm) torpedo tubes; 1 × Hedgehog Mk.10 anti-submarine mortar (144 rounds); 8 × Mk.6 depth charge projectors; 2 × Mk.9 depth charge tracks

USS Herzog (DE-178) was a Cannon-class destroyer escort in service with the United States Navy from 1943 to 1944. She was transferred to Brazil on 1 August 1944 and served as Beberibe (D-19) until 1966. She was scrapped in 1968.

== History ==
Herzog was named in honor of William Ralph Herzog who was posthumously awarded the Navy and Marine Corps Medal for his heroism in trying to save his shipmates in 1942. The ship was launched by Federal Shipbuilding & Drydock Co., Newark, New Jersey, on 5 September 1943; sponsored by Mrs. Alice A. Herzog, mother of the namesake; and commissioned on 6 October 1943.

=== U.S. Navy (1943-1944) ===
After conducting shakedown operations out of Bermuda, Herzog steamed from New York on 29 November 1943 on her first escort mission, accompanying USS Ariel (AF-22) to the West Indies and back to New York. Arriving on 18 December, she got underway as part of the escort for a merchant convoy. Protecting the ships through the dangerous Caribbean passages, Herzog arrived at the Panama Canal Zone on 27 December. Subsequently, she served as escort ship on shorter voyages between Recife, Brazil, and Trinidad.

From 14 April until 14 July 1944 Herzog served with Task Group 41.6 on patrol in the South Atlantic. Working with escort carrier USS Solomons (CVE-67) she searched the seas in the never-ending battle against German submarines. On 15 June she was detached to pick up survivors from a German submarine sunk by aircraft, and after returning to the group steamed to Recife, arriving on 23 June. After another brief cruise with the Task Group, she returned to Recife on 16 July.

=== Brazilian Navy (1944-1968) ===
She sailed to the Brazilian Naval Base at Natal, Brazil, on 28 July and was placed out of commission and loaned to the Brazilian Navy under lend-lease on 1 August 1944. The ship served Brazil as Beberibe (D-19) and on 30 June 1953 was transferred outright to that country under the Mutual Defense Assistance Program. The ship ran aground in February 1966, and was stricken and scrapped in 1968.
