= Myka =

Myka may refer to:

- Myka (river), a river in Perm Krai, Russia
- Myka Relocate, an American metalcore musical ensemble
- Myka 9, an American hip hop musician and producer and member of Freestyle Fellowship
- Myka Bering, fictional character on American television science fiction series Warehouse 13
