= USS Micka =

Cannon-class destroyer escort

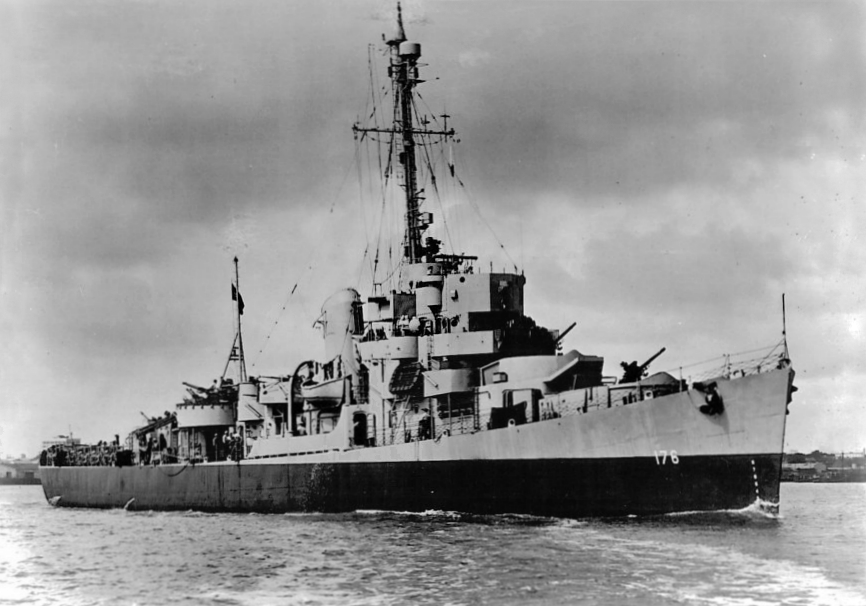

History

United States
- Name: USS Micka
- Namesake: Edward Micka
- Builder: Federal Shipbuilding and Drydock Company, Newark, New Jersey
- Laid down: 3 May 1943
- Launched: 22 August 1943
- Commissioned: 23 September 1943
- Decommissioned: 14 June 1946
- Stricken: 1 August 1965
- Fate: Sold for scrap, 15 May 1967

General characteristics
- Class & type: Cannon-class destroyer escort
- Displacement: 1,240 long tons (1,260 t) standard; 1,620 long tons (1,646 t) full
- Length: 306 ft (93 m) o/a; 300 ft (91 m) w/l
- Beam: 36 ft 10 in (11.23 m)
- Draft: 11 ft 8 in (3.56 m)
- Propulsion: 4 × GM Mod. 16-278A diesel engines with electric drive, 6,000 shp (4,474 kW), 2 screws
- Speed: 21 knots (39 km/h; 24 mph)
- Range: 10,800 nmi (20,000 km) at 12 kn (22 km/h; 14 mph)
- Complement: 15 officers and 201 enlisted
- Armament: 3 × single Mk.22 3"/50 caliber guns; 1 × twin 40 mm Mk.1 AA gun; 8 × 20 mm Mk.4 AA guns; 3 × 21-inch (533 mm) torpedo tubes; 1 × Hedgehog Mk.10 anti-submarine mortar (144 rounds); 8 × Mk.6 depth charge projectors; 2 × Mk.9 depth charge tracks

USS Micka (DE-176) was a Cannon-class destroyer escort in service with the United States Navy from 1943 to 1946. She was sold for scrap in 1967.

== Namesake ==
Edward Micka was born on 10 October 1915 at Cayuga, North Dakota. He enlisted in the United States Navy on 19 June 1934. Appointed midshipman from the Navy at large the following year, he was commissioned Ensign on 1 June 1939. He served on USS Minneapolis and USS Clemson prior to receiving his wings as a navy pilot and was attached to Fighting Squadron 9, on board USS Ranger, in November 1942.

On 8 November 1942, he led three flights in support of the initial phase of Operation Torch, the assault and occupation of Morocco. In the first two flights he led his sections against airdromes at Rabat Sale and Port Lyautey, destroying at least 17 hostile planes on the ground. During the third his section provided direct support to ground forces by destroying several machine gun nests. Two days later he participated in the attack on the Mediouna airdrome, conducting strafing runs at low altitudes. On his fifth run his plane was hit by antiaircraft fire, crashed and he was killed. He was posthumously awarded the Navy Cross.

== History ==
The ship was laid down on 3 May 1943 by the Federal Shipbuilding & Dry Dock Co., Kearny, New Jersey; launched on 22 August 1943; sponsored by Mrs. Edward Micka, widow of Lieutenant Micka; and commissioned on 23 September 1943.

=== World War II Atlantic Ocean operations ===
Assigned to Escort Division 24 Micka guarded merchantmen and naval supply vessels plying the waters of the eastern Atlantic from Recife, Brazil, to New York City until 12 November 1944. She then reported at Recife for three months of mid-ocean anti-submarine patrols with the U.S. 4th Fleet. Detached in March 1945, she steamed north; served briefly with the Eastern Sea Frontier on anti-submarine patrol; and then completed a round trip voyage to Oran, Algeria, as convoy escort. On 11 June she entered the Charleston, South Carolina, Navy Yard for overhaul preparatory to her transfer to the Pacific.

=== Transfer to the Pacific at war's end ===
Micka arrived at Pearl Harbor on 15 August, the day after Japan agreed to surrender under the terms of the Potsdam Declaration. She remained in Hawaii, conducting local exercises, until 18 December, when, with over 300 naval passengers, she got underway for the east coast. She disembarked her passengers at Boston, Massachusetts, on 6 January and sailed at the end of the month for Green Cove Springs, Florida.

=== Post-War decommissioning ===
At Green Cove Springs she decommissioned and entered the Atlantic Reserve Fleet on 14 June 1946. Micka remained berthed in the St. Johns River until struck from the Naval Vessel Register on 1 August 1965, and sold for scrapping to Peck Iron & Metals Co., on 15 May 1967.
