= Van Amstel-class frigate =

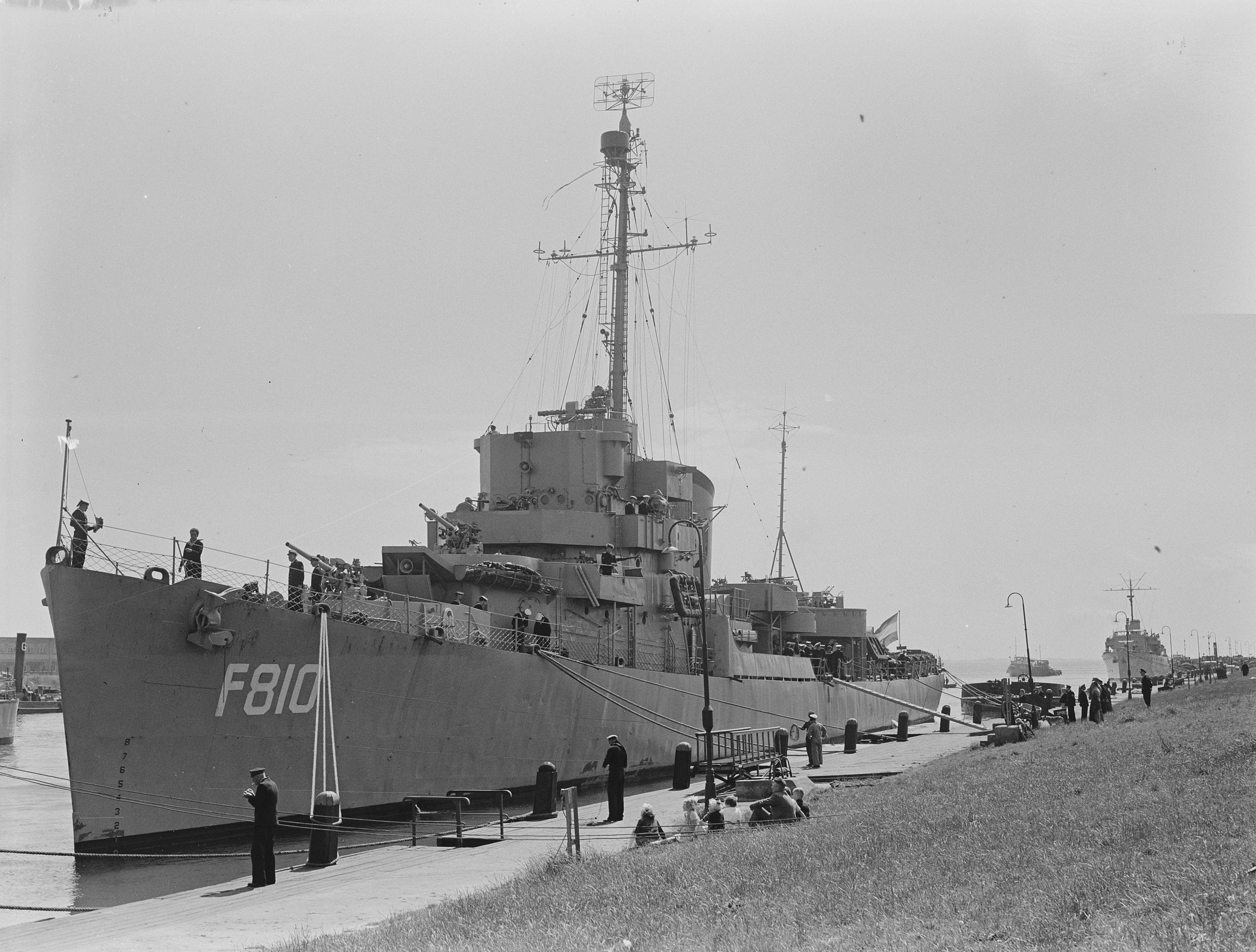
- HNLMS De Zeeuw at Den Helder on 9 July 1951

Class overview
- Name: Van Amstel class
- Builders: Dravo Corporation; Federal Shipbuilding and Drydock Company
- Operators: Royal Netherlands Navy
- Succeeded by: Van Speijk class
- Subclasses: Cannon-class destroyer escort
- Built: 1943-1944
- In commission: 1950-1967
- Completed: 6
- Retired: 6

General characteristics
- Type: Frigate
- Displacement: 1,240 tons standard; 1,620 tons full load
- Length: 93.3 m (306 ft)
- Beam: 11 m (36 ft)
- Draft: 3.5 m (11 ft) full load
- Propulsion: 4 GM Mod. 16-278A diesel engines with electric drive; 6,000 shp (4,500 kW), 2 screws
- Speed: 21 knots (39 km/h)
- Range: 10,800 nautical miles (20,000 km; 12,400 mi) at 12 knots (22 km/h)
- Complement: 15 officers; 201 enlisted men
- Armament: 3 × 3 in (76 mm)/50 guns (3×1); 2 × 40 mm Bofors AA guns (1x2); 8 × 20 mm Oerlikon AA guns (8×1); 3 × Torpedo tubes for 21-inch Mark 15 torpedo (1×3); 8 × depth charge projectors; 1 × Hedgehog anti-submarine mortar; 2 x depth charge tracks

The Van Amstel class was a class of six frigates that were built during the Second World War in the United States and served as Cannon-class destroyer escort during that war. After the war the destroyer escorts were loaned to the Dutch navy as part of the MDAP and from 1950 to 1967 served as the Van Amstel-class frigates.

== History ==
During the Second World War the United States built several destroyer escorts, such as the Cannon class. The construction time of the destroyer escorts was short, it took about four months to build a Cannon-class destroyer escort. This led to the construction of many escorts. Some ships were immediately after construction given to allied nations such as the Brazilian Navy and the French Navy. During the Second World War the destroyer escorts functioned as protectors of the supply and troop transport vessels against the submarine threat and airborne attacks. Although the estimated lifetime of the destroyer escorts was short, many managed to reach an age of 20 years. After World War II, a large number of destroyer escorts were loaned or sold to other navies, including the Netherlands. The last active Cannon-class destroyer was the Filipino BRP Rajah Humabon, the former USS Atherton, which was decommissioned in 2018.

After the Second World War the Mutual Defense Aid Program signed to help West-Europe militarily and financially. The aim of the MDAP program was to ensure that West-Europe remained outside the sphere of influence of the Soviet Union. To this end the United States provided under the MDAP a lot of money and material to West European countries, for example, in 1950 1,450,000,000 dollars was spent under the MDAP. In the period 1950-1951 the Netherlands was lent six frigates of the Cannon-class as part of the MDAP. These ships were the former USS Burrows, USS Rine Heart, USS Gustafson, USS O'Neill, USS Stern and the USS Eisner, which were put into service as the HNLMS Van Amstel, HNLMS De Bitter, HNLMS Van Ewijck, HNLMS Dubois, HNLMS De Zeeuw and HNLMS Van Zijll. The destroyer escorts that were meant for the Netherlands were the first ships that the United States, on the grounds of the MDAP program made available to an ally.

The frigates of the Van Amstel-class had, like all other Cannon-class ships, a diesel electric tandem motor drive and were because of this known in the US as the DET type. The four diesels together delivered 6000pk for a maximum speed of 19 knots. The range of the ships was considerable: 10,000 nautical miles.

In the 1960s were outdated and needed to be replaced. The Royal Netherlands Navy began designing in August 1960 the successor of the Van Amstel-class frigates. These frigates would later be known as the Van Speijk-class frigates, and started to replace the Cannon-class frigates in 1967. In 1968 the Cannon-class frigates were sold and scrapped by various companies.

== Ships in class ==
The following ships were part of the Van Amstel-class, they were built by several shipbuilders.

Ship	Pennant number	Commissioned	Shipbuilder	Fate
Van Amstel	F806	1950	Dravo Corporation	Returned to the United States in 1967.
De Bitter	F807	1950	Federal Shipbuilding and Drydock Company	Returned to the United States in 1967.
Van Ewijk	F808	1950	Federal Shipbuilding and Drydock Company	Returned to the United States in 1967.
Dubois	F809	1950	Federal Shipbuilding and Drydock Company	Returned to the United States in 1967.
De Zeeuw	F810	1951	Federal Shipbuilding and Drydock Company	Returned to the United States in 1967.
Van Zijll	F811	1951	Federal Shipbuilding and Drydock Company	Returned to the United States in 1967.

== See also ==
- List of frigates of the Netherlands

Equivalent frigates of the same era

- Riga class
- Azopardo class
- Blackwood class
- Centauro class

== Bibliography ==
- Mark, Chris (2006) [2000]. Amerikaanse fregatten van de Van Amstel-klasse en de Wolf-klasse. Amsterdam: Stichting Promotie Maritieme Tradities.
- W.H.E., van Amstel (1991). De schepen van de Koninklijke Marine vanaf 1945. Alkmaar: De Alk. ISBN 9060139976.
