= List of ship commissionings in 1950 =

The list of ship commissionings in 1950 includes a chronological list of all ships commissioned in 1950.

	Operator	Ship	Class and type	Pennant	Other notes
20 January	United States Navy	Siboney	Commencement Bay-class escort carrier	CVE-112	Recommissioning from reserve
8 May	Royal Australian Navy	Tobruk	Battle-class destroyer	D37	
25 March	United States Navy	Oriskany	Essex-class aircraft carrier	CV-34	
1 June	Royal Netherlands Navy	Van Amstel	Van Amstel-class frigate	F806	Former USS Burrows
1 June	Royal Netherlands Navy	De Bitter	Van Amstel-class frigate	F807	Former USS Rinehart
29 July	United States Military Sea Transportation Service	Sitkoh Bay	Casablanca-class aircraft transport	CVE-86	Placed in service from United States Navy reserve
22 August	United States Military Sea Transportation Service	Cape Esperance	Casablanca-class aircraft transport	CVE-88	Placed in service from United States Navy reserve
28 August	United States Navy	Princeton	Essex-class aircraft carrier	CV-37	
12 September	United States Navy	Bairoko	Commencement Bay-class escort carrier	CVE-115	Recommissioning from reserve
15 September	United States Navy	Monterey	Independence-class aircraft carrier	CVL-26	Recommissioning from reserve
10 October	Royal Netherlands Navy	Van Ewijk	Van Amstel-class frigate	F808	Former USS Gustafson
10 October	Royal Netherlands Navy	Dubois	Van Amstel-class frigate	F809	Former USS O'Neill
Unknown date	U.S. Fish and Wildlife Service	John R. Manning	Fisheries research vessel	FWS 1002	Commissioned in early 1950
Unknown date	U.S. Fish and Wildlife Service	Lt. Raymond Zussman	Cargo liner	FS-246	Purchased 9 June, in commission by 17 June; renamed Penguin II 21 September 1950
