= List of ship commissionings in 1951 =

The list of ship commissionings in 1951 includes a chronological compilation of ships commissioned in 1951. In cases where no official commissioning ceremony was held, the date of service entry may be used instead.

Date	Operator	Ship	Class and type	Notes	Ref
3 January	United States Navy	Rendova	Commencement Bay-class escort carrier	Recommissioned from reserve	
15 January	United States Navy	Bon Homme Richard	Essex-class aircraft carrier	Recommissioned from reserve	
17 January	United States Navy	Antietam	Essex-class aircraft carrier	Recommissioned from reserve	
1 February	United States Navy	Essex	Essex-class aircraft carrier	Recommissioned from reserve	
3 February	United States Navy	Tarawa	Essex-class aircraft carrier	Recommissioned from reserve	
26 February	United States Navy	Abbot	Fletcher-class destroyer	Recommissioned from reserve in San Diego	
28 April	United States Navy	Block Island	Commencement Bay-class escort carrier	Recommissioned from reserve	
3 May	Royal Netherlands Navy	De Zeeuw	Van Amstel-class frigate	Ex-USS Eisner	
3 May	Royal Netherlands Navy	Van Zijll	Van Amstel-class frigate	Ex-USS Stern	
19 May	(United States) Military Sea Transportation Service	Corregidor	Casablanca-class aircraft transport	Placed in service from United States Navy reserve	
21 May	United States Navy	Gilbert Islands	Commencement Bay-class escort carrier	Recommissioned from reserve	
20 June	United States Navy	Salerno Bay	Commencement Bay-class escort carrier	Recommissioned from reserve	
3 July	United States Navy	Kula Gulf	Commencement Bay-class escort carrier	Recommissioned from reserve	
10 July	Polish Navy	Zetempowiec	Hospital ship	Conversion from merchant cargo ship Opole	
26 July	United States Navy	Point Cruz	Commencement Bay-class escort carrier	Recommissioned from reserve	
28 September	United States Navy	Wasp	Essex-class aircraft carrier	Recommissioned from reserve	
31 October	(United States) Military Sea Transportation Service	Windham Bay	Casablanca-class aircraft transport	Placed in service from United States Navy reserve	
30 November	United States Navy	Bennington	Essex-class aircraft carrier	Recommissioned from reserve	
