= Destroyer escort (disambiguation) =

Destroyer escort is the US Navy classification for a smaller, lightly armed warship designed to be used to escort convoys of merchant marine ships.

Destroyer escort may also refer to:

- Abukuma-class destroyer escort, a destroyer escort class of the Japanese Maritime Self-Defense Force
- Captain-class frigate, a designation given to 78 frigates of the Royal Navy, constructed in the United States
- Chikugo-class destroyer escort, a destroyer escort class of the Japanese Maritime Self-Defense Force
- F-class escort ship, a class of fleet escorts used by the Kriegsmarine roughly comparable to American destroyer escorts
- Ishikari-class destroyer escort, a destroyer escort class of the Japanese Maritime Self-Defense Force
- Isuzu-class destroyer escort, a destroyer escort class of the Japanese Maritime Self-Defense Force
- Mackenzie-class destroyer, a class of four escort destroyers operated by the Royal Canadian Navy
- Restigouche-class destroyer, a class of seven escort destroyers operated by the Royal Canadian Navy
- River-class destroyer escort, a class of six escort destroyers operated by the Royal Australian Navy
- St. Laurent-class destroyer, a class of seven escort destroyers operated by the Royal Canadian Navy
- V and W-class destroyer, a class of destroyer built for the Royal Navy under the War Emergency Programme of the First World War
- Yūbari-class destroyer escort, a destroyer escort class of the Japanese Maritime Self-Defense Force

== See also ==
- Escort destroyer (disambiguation)
- Ocean escort, type of United States Navy warship
- Frigate, any of several types of warship
