= Call girl (disambiguation) =

A call girl is a sex worker usually booked by telephone.

Call Girl(s) or The Call Girl(s) may also refer to:

== Film ==
- The Call Girls (1973 film), a Hong Kong film
- Call Girl (1974 film), a Bollywood musical
- The Call Girls (1977 film), a Hong Kong drama
- Call Girl '88, a 1988 Hong Kong drama
- Call Girls (1997 film), a Japanese drama
- Call Girl (2007 film), a Portuguese film
- A Call Girl, a 2009 Slovenian drama
- Call Girl (2012 film), a Swedish drama

== Literature ==
- The Call Girl, a 1958 nonfiction book by Harold Greenwald
- The Call-Girls, a 1971 novel by Arthur Koestler

== Music ==
- Call Girl the Musical, a 2009 Australian musical
- "Call Girl" (song), from the 2015 album FFS by FFS

== Other uses ==
- "Call Girl" (Family Guy), a 2013 episode of the sitcom
- Call Girl, an alias of fictional character Wendy Testaburger from South Park

== See also ==
- Call (disambiguation)
- Escort (disambiguation)
- Girl (disambiguation)
- Hooker (disambiguation)
- Prostitute (disambiguation)
- Call centre
- Call Center Girl, a 2013 Filipino film
- Phone sex
- Switchboard operator (phone operator)
- Telemarketer
- Television X Callgirls Live, a 2005 TV show
