= Escort =

Escort may refer to:

== Protection ==
- Bodyguard, a security operative who accompanies clients for their personal protection
- Police escort, a feature offered by law enforcement agencies to assist in transporting individuals
- Safety escort service, a service provided on and around many college and university campuses to help ensure the safety of students and staff
- Escort carrier, a small aircraft carrier used in World War II
- Escort destroyer, a warship assigned to protect merchant ships in time of war
- Escort fighter, a World War II concept for a fighter aircraft designed to escort bombers
- Escort vehicle, a vehicle that escorts oversize trucks or large vehicle convoys on highways

== Film ==
- The Escort (1993 film), an Italian film directed by Ricky Tognazzi
- The Escort (1996 film), a Canadian film directed by Denis Langlois
- The Escort (1997 film), an American film directed by Gary Graver
- Escort (2001 film), a Chinese film directed by Qi Xing
- Escort (2006 film), a Dutch film directed by Frank Ketelaar
- The Escort (2015 film), an American film directed by Will Slocombe
- The Escorts, UK distribution title of Amateur Night (film) starring Jason Biggs

== Music ==
- Escort (band), an American nu-disco band
- The Escorts (Iowa band), a 1960s rock and roll band from Iowa
- The Escorts (British band), a Merseybeat group
- The Escorts (New Jersey vocal group), a soul/R&B group formed in Rahway State Prison, New Jersey
- Escort (album), by Escort, 2011
- "Escort", a song by the Sea and Cake from The Biz, 1995

== Processions ==
A type of procession, an organized body of people advancing in a formal or ceremonial manner:

- Cavalcade, a procession on horseback, or a mass trail ride by a company of riders
- Motorcade, a procession of vehicles

== Prostitution ==
- Escort (call girl or male prostitute), a sex worker who advertises their work/services inconspicuously
  - Escort agency, a company that provides customers with sexual/romantic companions

== Other uses ==
- Escort (play), a 1942 play by the British writer Patrick Hastings
- Escort (magazine), a British men's adult magazine
- Ford Escort, a name used for various automobiles produced by Ford
- Escort destroyer (disambiguation)
- Escorts Group, an Indian engineering conglomerate manufacturing tractors and auto components
- Escorts Mujesar metro station, Delhi, India

== See also ==
- Convoy, a group of vehicles or ships traveling together for mutual support
