= Escort destroyer (disambiguation) =

Escort destroyer (DDE) is a US Navy post World War II classification for destroyers (DD) modified for and assigned to escort fleets.

Escort destroyer may also refer to:

- Hunt-class destroyer, a class of destroyers of the Royal Navy designed to escort convoys
- River-class destroyer escort, a class of escort destroyers operated by the Royal Australian Navy
- V and W-class destroyer, a grouping of similar classes of Royal Navy First World War destroyers used for convoy escort in the Second World War
- F-class escort ship, a class of fleet escorts used by the Kriegsmarine during the Second World War
- Matsu-class destroyer escort destroyers built by the Imperial Japanese Navy not intended to work with the fleet
- Tachibana-class destroyer escort destroyers built by the Imperial Japanese Navy not intended to work with the fleet

== See also ==
- Destroyer escort, a US Navy classification for a smaller, lightly armed warship designed to be used to escort convoys of merchant marine ships
- Royal Navy § Escort units, the escort fleet, in the form of frigates and destroyers
- Destroyer escort (disambiguation)
- Ocean escort
