= Estcourt (disambiguation) =

Estcourt is a town in South Africa.

Estcourt may also refer to:

- Estcourt (surname)
- Estcourt baronets
- Estcourt Station, Maine, northernmost point in New England
- Estcourt, Quebec, village located in the municipality of Pohénégamook
- Estcourt High School, South Africa

== See also ==
- Escort (disambiguation)
