= Animal Nature =

Studio album by Escort
- Released: October 30, 2015
- Genre: Nu-disco
- Length: 41:41
- Label: Escort
- Producer: Dan Balis; Eugene Cho

Escort chronology
Escort (2011)	Animal Nature (2015)	City Life (2019)

Animal Nature is the second album by an American nu-disco band Escort, released on October 30, 2015, through Escort Records. The album consists of ten new tracks along with "a handful of alternate edits and remixes of album cuts".

== Reception ==
Professional ratings
Review scores
Source	Rating
AllMusic	3.5/5 stars
Pitchfork	6.8/10

In a review for Pitchfork, Ilana Kaplan says the album is a more polished production then the band's debut with a little less funk, moving from "funk disco into a late '70s disco/early '80s synth phase, blurring genre lines," and Escort has "hit a nostalgic sweet spot that will never grow old."

Andy Kellman of AllMusic states that "Animal Nature comes across more as the work of a band than of a studio project" and contains "references to specific disco and post-disco artists and bygone production touches less obvious, a little more concealed than they are on the 2011 album." The standout track is "Body Talk", which Kellman calls "a gleaming compound of early-'80s boogie and early-'90s house."

Andy Battaglia of NPR says the members of the band are "vintage dance-music precisionists" but their goal for Animal Nature "is more than just disco in a wide-eyed sound that peers out to stare down the many decades since." He also praises the album's production value, calling it "slick and stylish and light — clearly in thrall to the sound it revisits."

== Track listing ==
Animal Nature track listing
No.	Title	Length
1.	"Body Talk"	4:39
2.	"Temptation"	3:35
3.	"Barbarians"	3:15
4.	"If You Say So"	4:25
5.	"Helium"	4:48
6.	"Animal Nature"	4:29
7.	"My Life"	3:28
8.	"Actor Out of Work"	3:25
9.	"Cabaret"	3:17
10.	"Dancer"	6:20
Total length:		41:41
