= USS O'Neill =

Cannon-class destroyer escort

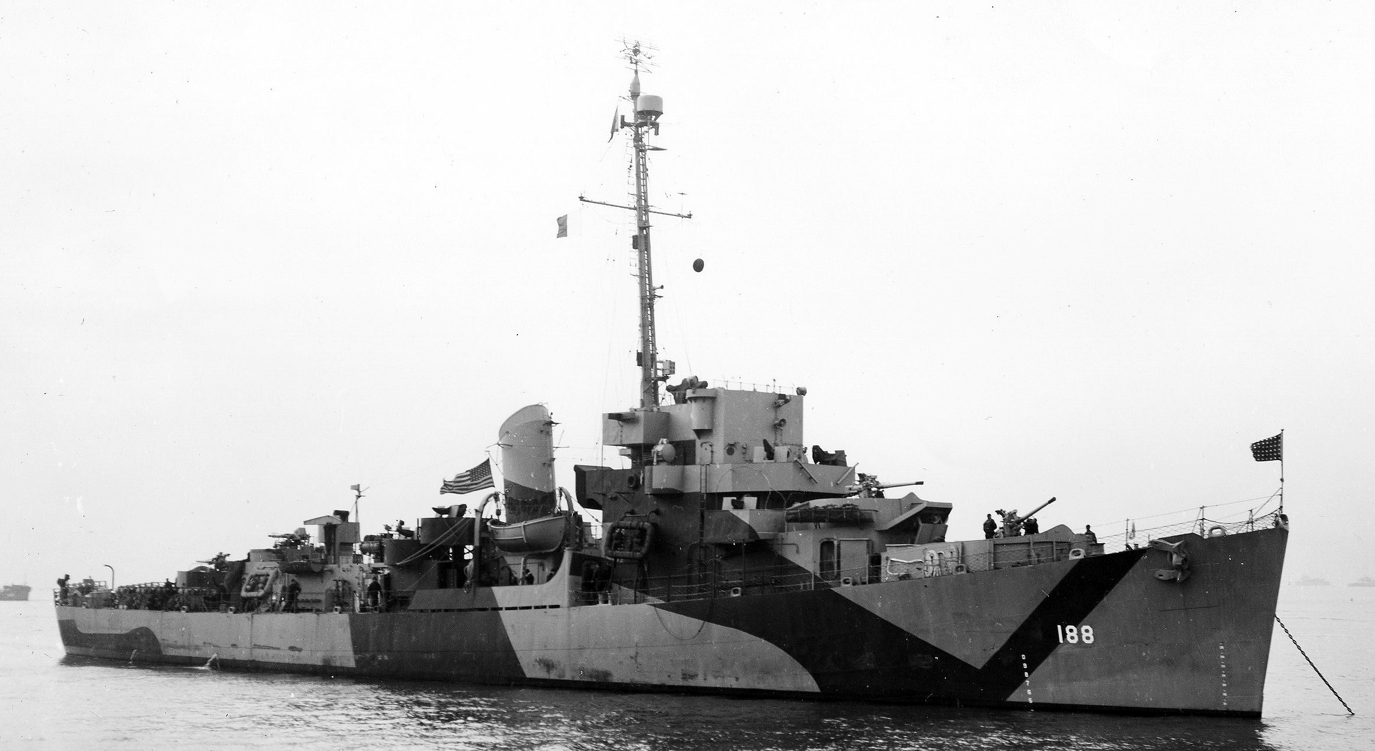

History

United States
- Name: USS O'Neill
- Namesake: William Thomas O'Neill, Jr.
- Builder: Federal Shipbuilding and Drydock Company, Newark, New Jersey
- Laid down: 26 August 1943
- Launched: 14 November 1943
- Commissioned: 6 December 1943
- Decommissioned: 2 May 1946
- Stricken: 20 December 1950
- Fate: Transferred to the Netherlands, 23 October 1950

Netherlands
- Name: Hr.Ms. Dubois (F809)
- Acquired: 23 October 1950
- Fate: Returned to US Navy, December 1967; Sold for scrapping, February 1968

General characteristics
- Class & type: Cannon-class destroyer escort
- Displacement: 1,240 long tons (1,260 t) standard; 1,620 long tons (1,646 t) full
- Length: 306 ft (93 m) o/a; 300 ft (91 m) w/l
- Beam: 36 ft 10 in (11.23 m)
- Draft: 11 ft 8 in (3.56 m)
- Propulsion: 4 × GM Mod. 16-278A diesel engines with electric drive, 6,000 shp (4,474 kW), 2 screws
- Speed: 21 knots (39 km/h; 24 mph)
- Range: 10,800 nmi (20,000 km) at 12 kn (22 km/h; 14 mph)
- Complement: 15 officers and 201 enlisted
- Armament: 3 × single Mk.22 3"/50 caliber guns; 1 × twin 40 mm Mk.1 AA gun; 8 × 20 mm Mk.4 AA guns; 3 × 21-inch (533 mm) torpedo tubes; 1 × Hedgehog Mk.10 anti-submarine mortar (144 rounds); 8 × Mk.6 depth charge projectors; 2 × Mk.9 depth charge tracks

USS O'Neill (DE-188) was a Cannon-class destroyer escort in service with the United States Navy from 1943 to 1946. In 1950, she was transferred to the Royal Netherlands Navy, where she served as Hr. Ms. Dubois (F809) until 1967. She was scrapped in 1968.

== History ==
=== United States Navy (1943–1950) ===
USS O'Neill was named for Ensign William Thomas O'Neill, Jr., killed on 7 December 1941, during the attack on Pearl Harbor, while serving aboard USS Arizona. O'Neill was laid down on 26 August 1943 by the Federal Shipbuilding and Drydock Company, Newark, New Jersey; launched on 14 November 1943; sponsored by Mrs. W. T. O'Neill and commissioned on 6 December 1943.

==== Battle of the Atlantic ====
Following a shakedown cruise to Bermuda, O'Neill reported to the U.S. Atlantic Fleet for duty. Her first major assignment was a convoy operation from New York City to the United Kingdom. This was followed by a series of similar operations, shepherding convoys between U. S. ports and: Casablanca, French Morocco; Bizerte, Tunisia; and Belfast, Northern Ireland. All Atlantic crossings were made without the loss of a single vessel.

==== Pacific War ====
On 31 October O'Neill transited the Panama Canal and reported to the Pacific Fleet. Arriving in the forward area in December, she joined the 3rd Fleet under Admiral Halsey, and took part in the operations which culminated in the reconquest of Luzon in the Philippines.

In February 1945, O'Neill became a unit of the 5th Fleet under Admiral Spruance, and served as an escort for the transports which landed the 3rd Marine Division at Iwo Jima. This landing took place on 24 February, and thereafter O'Neill served in the anti-submarine screen around the island.

===== Okinawa =====
After a passage to Milne Bay, New Guinea, O'Neill joined the force assigned for the invasion of Okinawa. The initial landings were made on 1 April. In the prolonged fight for the island, she served almost continuously for 60 days on ASW picket duty – shooting down a Japanese twin-engined bomber on 25 May, and being hit by a kamikaze suicide plane on the 26th. On the latter occasion two men were killed and 17 were wounded aboard the ship.

Shortly after a change of command on 16 June, O'Neill returned to San Pedro, California. for repairs of battle damage and major overhaul. While in San Pedro the war in the Pacific came to an end. On completion of overhaul, she again transited the Panama Canal, returning to the Atlantic Fleet.

=== Royal Netherlands Navy (1950–1967) ===
O'Neill was placed out of commission in reserve on 2 May 1946, and berthed at Green Cove Springs, Florida, until 23 October 1950, at which time she was transferred to the Netherlands under the Mutual Defense Assistance Program. O'Neill was struck from the U. S. Naval Vessel Register on 20 December 1950. After operating as Hr. Ms. Dubois (F809) she was returned to the US Navy in December 1967, and was sold to a scrap yard in West Germany in February 1968.
