= USS Eisner (DE-192) =

Cannon-class destroyer escort

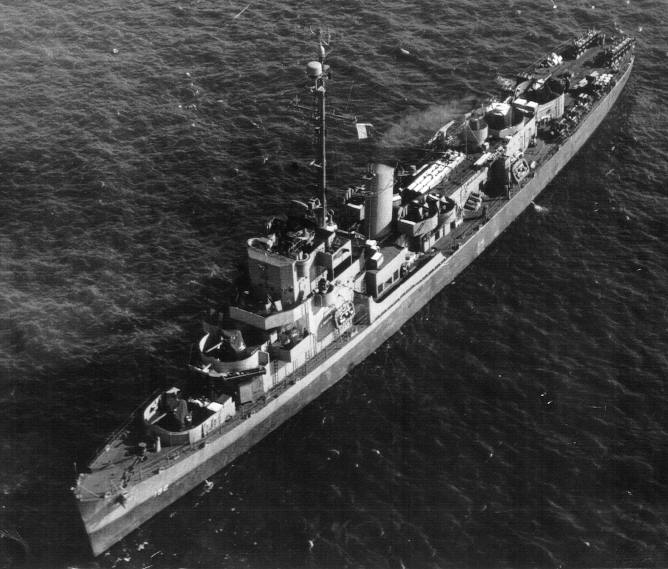
- USS Eisner (DE-192) on 16 January 1944

History

United States
- Name: USS Eisner
- Namesake: Jacques Rodney Eisner
- Builder: Federal Shipbuilding and Drydock Company, Newark, New Jersey
- Laid down: 23 September 1943
- Launched: 12 December 1943
- Commissioned: 1 January 1944
- Decommissioned: 15 July 1946
- Stricken: 7 March 1951
- Identification: DE-192
- Honors and awards: 1 battle star (World War II)
- Fate: Transferred to the Netherlands, 1 March 1951

Netherlands
- Name: HNLMS De Zeeuw
- Acquired: 1 March 1951
- Identification: F810
- Fate: Returned to US Navy, 15 December 1967; Sold for scrapping, February 1968

General characteristics
- Class & type: Cannon-class destroyer escort
- Displacement: 1,240 long tons (1,260 t) standard; 1,620 long tons (1,646 t) full
- Length: 306 ft (93 m) o/a; 300 ft (91 m) w/l
- Beam: 36 ft 10 in (11.23 m)
- Draft: 11 ft 8 in (3.56 m)
- Propulsion: 4 × GM Mod. 16-278A diesel engines with electric drive, 6,000 shp (4,474 kW), 2 screws
- Speed: 21 knots (39 km/h; 24 mph)
- Range: 10,800 nmi (20,000 km) at 12 kn (22 km/h; 14 mph)
- Complement: 15 officers and 201 enlisted
- Armament: 3 × single Mk.22 3-inch/50-caliber guns; 1 × twin 40 mm Mk.1 AA gun; 8 × 20 mm Mk.4 AA guns; 3 × 21 inch (533 mm) torpedo tubes; 1 × Hedgehog Mk.10 anti-submarine mortar (144 rounds); 8 × Mk.6 depth charge projectors; 2 × Mk.9 depth charge tracks

USS Eisner (DE-192) was a Cannon-class destroyer escort built for the United States Navy during World War II. She served in the Atlantic Ocean and the Pacific Ocean and provided escort service against submarine and air attack for Navy vessels and convoys. Eisner was named in honor of Jacques Rodney Eisner who was killed in action during the Battle of Guadalcanal on 13 November 1942 while serving in USS San Francisco. Following the war, the ship was transferred to the Royal Netherlands Navy under the Mutual Defense Assistance Program in 1951 and served as HNLMS De Zeeuw. The Netherlands returned the ship to the United States in 1967 and Eisner was sold for scrap in February 1968.

== Service history ==
The ship was launched on 12 December 1943 by Federal Shipbuilding and Dry Dock Co. at their yard in Kearny, New Jersey, sponsored by Mrs. Lester Eisner, Jr. the sister-in-law of Lieutenant (junior grade) Eisner. The destroyer escort was commissioned on 1 January 1944.

On 15 February 1944 Eisner became the flagship for Commander, Escort Division 55. After escorting a convoy to Galveston, Texas, and back to Norfolk, Virginia, Eisner was assigned to Task Force TF 63 for transatlantic escort duty. She made one voyage to Recife, Brazil, two voyages to the Mediterranean Sea, then five to British and French ports, guarding the supply line to the advancing Allied troops in Europe.

Eisner sailed from New York on 9 June 1945 for Eniwetok the day after European hostilities ended. She escorted convoys between Eniwetok and Ulithi, then screened the attack transport USS Achernar to Wake Island with forces to repossess the island. She continued patrol and escort duty out of Eniwetok until 15 December 1945, then sailed home.

She was placed out of commission in reserve at Mayport, Florida, on 5 July 1946. On 1 March 1951 she was transferred to the Netherlands under the Mutual Defense Assistance Program, and served as HNLMS De Zeeuw (F810). She was returned to the United States Navy on 15 December 1967, and then sold for scrapping in February 1968.
