= Destroyer escort =

US Navy warship classification

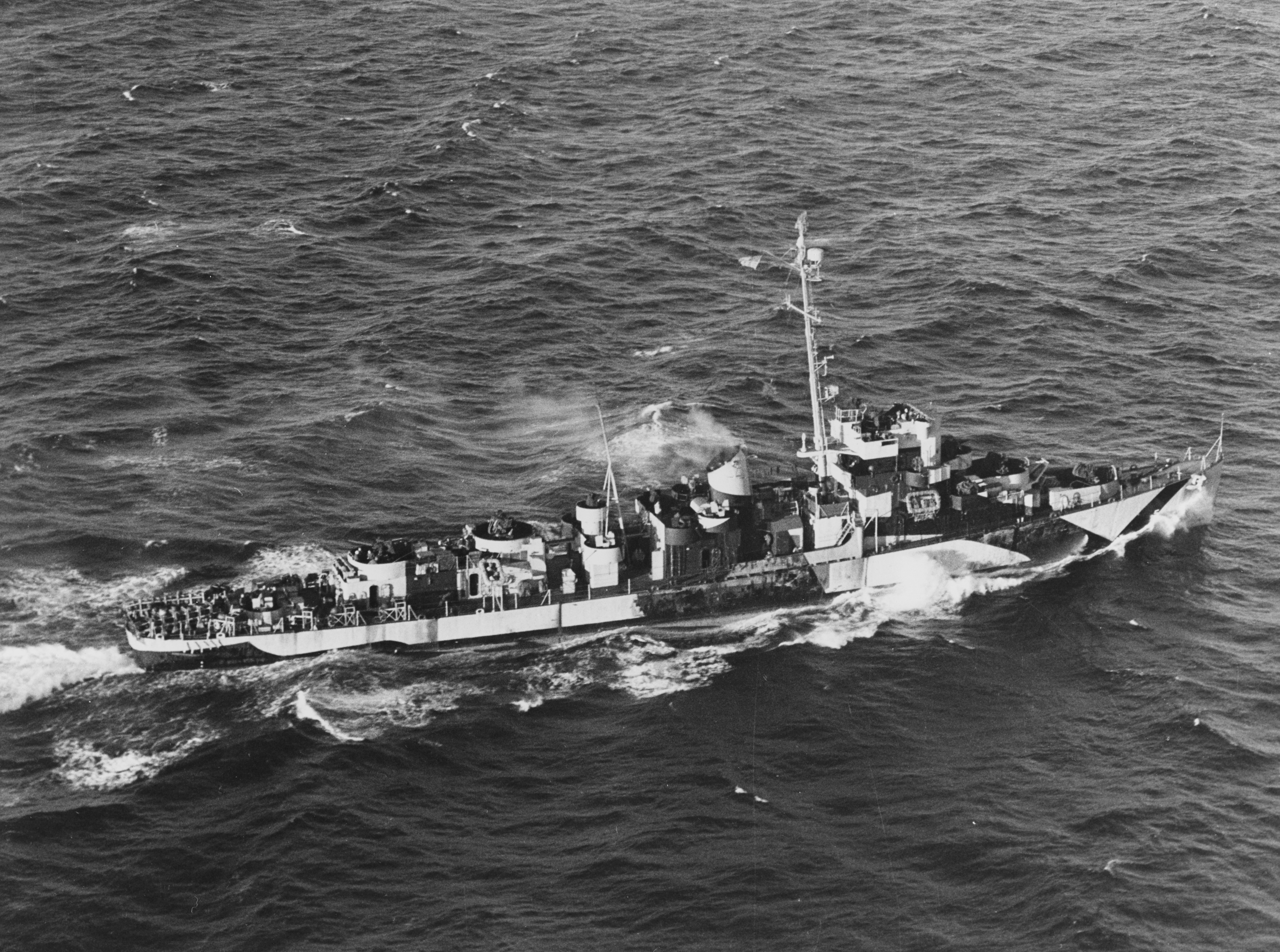
USS Evarts

Destroyer escort (DE) was the United States Navy mid-20th-century classification for a 20-knot (37 km/h; 23 mph) warship designed with the endurance necessary to escort mid-ocean convoys of merchant marine ships.

Development of the destroyer escort was promoted by the British need in World War II for anti-submarine ships that could operate in open oceans at speeds of up to 20 knots. These "British Destroyer Escorts" were designed by the US for mass-production under Lend-Lease as a less expensive alternative to fleet destroyers.

The Royal Navy and Commonwealth forces identified such warships as frigates, and that classification was widely accepted when the United States redesignated destroyer escorts as frigates (FF) in 1975. From circa 1954 until 1975 new-build US Navy ships designated as destroyer escorts (DE) were called ocean escorts. Similar types of warships in other navies of the time included the 46 diesel powered Kaibōkan of the Imperial Japanese Navy, 10 Kriegsmarine F-class escort ships, and the two Amiral Murgescu-class vessels of the Romanian Navy.

Postwar destroyer escorts and frigates were larger than those produced during wartime, with increased anti-aircraft capability, but remained smaller and slower than postwar destroyers. As Cold War destroyer escorts became as large as wartime destroyers, the United States Navy converted some of their World War II destroyers to escort destroyers (DDE).

== General description ==
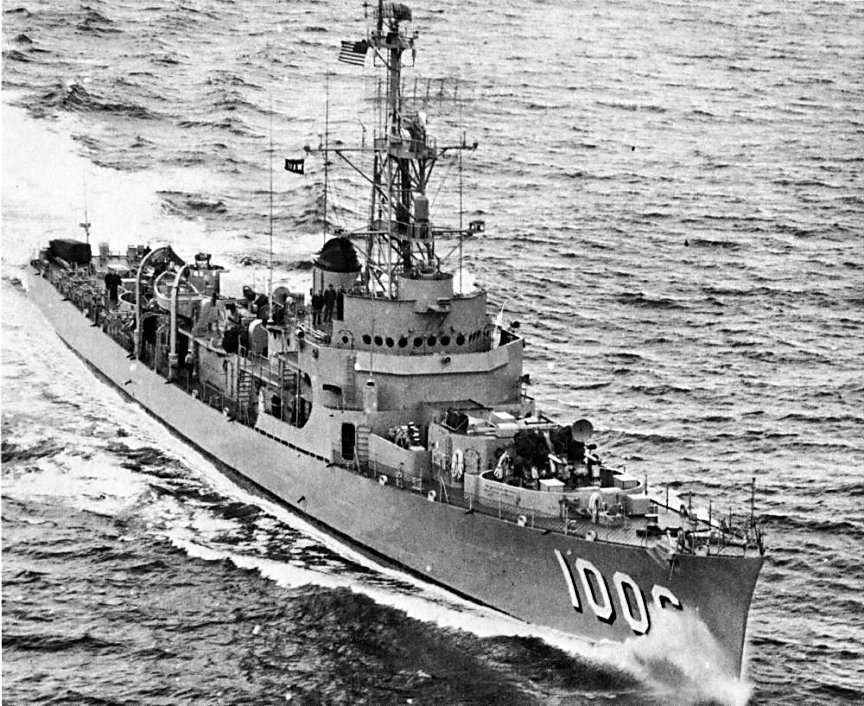
USS Dealey

Full-sized destroyers must be able to steam as fast or faster than cruisers and fast capital ships such as fleet carriers. This typically requires a speed of 25–35 knots (46–65 km/h) 28-40mph) (dependent upon the era and navy). They must carry torpedoes and a smaller caliber of naval guns to use against enemy ships, anti-aircraft guns, and antisubmarine detection equipment and weapons. While these requirements made the destroyer a fast all-around combatant, this made them too valuable to be relegated to convoy escort duties.

A destroyer escort needed only to be able to maneuver relative to a slow convoy (which in World War II would travel at 10 to 12 knots (19 to 22 km/h)), be able to defend against aircraft, and detect, pursue, and attack submarines. These lower requirements greatly reduce the size, cost, and crew required for the destroyer escort. Destroyer escorts were optimized for antisubmarine warfare, having a tighter turning radius and more specialized armament (such as the forward-firing Hedgehog mortar) than fleet destroyers. The slower speed of destroyer escorts was not a liability in this context as sonar was useless at speeds over 20 knots (37 km/h).

As an alternative to geared steam-turbine propulsion found in sloops of similar purpose, size and speed (as well as full-sized destroyers and larger warships), many US destroyer escorts of the World War II period had diesel-electric or turboelectric drive, in which the engine rooms functioned as power stations supplying current to electric motors sited close to the propellers. Electric drive was selected because it does not need gearboxes (produced on special precise machining tooling available in limited quantities, which were heavily in demand for the fast fleet destroyers) to adjust engine speed to the much lower optimal speed for the propellers. The current from the engine room can be used equally well for other purposes, and after the war, many destroyer escorts were re-used as floating power stations for coastal cities in Latin America under programs funded by the World Bank.. Edsall-class ships were the exception to this and they used a geared diesel engine to drive the propellers directly. John C. Butlers used the typical boiler and geared turbine propulsion system.

Destroyer escorts were also useful for coastal antisubmarine and radar picket ship duty. During World War II, seven destroyer escorts (DEs) were converted to radar picket destroyer escorts (DERs), supplementing radar picket destroyers. Although these were relegated to secondary roles after the war, in the mid-1950s, 36 more DEs were converted to DERs, serving as such until 1960–1965. Their mission was to extend the Distant Early Warning Line on both coasts, in conjunction with 16 Guardian-class radar picket ships, which were converted Liberty ships.

During World War II, some 95 destroyer escorts were converted by the US to high-speed transports (APDs). This involved adding an extra deck which allowed space for about 10 officers and 150 men. Two large davits were also installed, one on either side of the ship, from which landing craft (LCVPs) could be launched.

== Origins ==
The Lend-Lease Act was passed into law in the United States in March 1941, enabling the United Kingdom to procure merchant ships, warships, munitions, and other materiel from the US, to help with the war effort. This enabled the UK to commission the US to design, build, and supply an escort vessel that was suitable for antisubmarine warfare in deep open-ocean situations, which they did in June 1941. Captain E.L. Cochrane of the American Bureau of Shipping came up with a design which was known as the British destroyer escort (BDE). The BDE designation was retained by the first six destroyer escorts transferred to the United Kingdom (BDE 1, 2, 3, 4, 12, and 46); of the initial order of 50, these were the only ones the Royal Navy received, the rest being reclassified as destroyer escorts on 25 January 1943 and taken over by the United States Navy.

When the United States entered the war, and found they also required an antisubmarine warfare ship and that the destroyer escort fitted their needs perfectly, a system of rationing was put in place whereby out of every five destroyer escorts completed, four would be allocated to the U.S. Navy and one to the Royal Navy.

== Alternatives ==
Destroyer escorts were designed and built to naval construction standards, and as such could only be built at yards experienced with naval standards. The United States Maritime Commission created its S2-S2-AQ1 design – which was based on the British-designed River class – for much the same role but using civilian construction standards. These ships would be classed by the Navy as the Tacoma class frigates (PF). These frigates had a greater range than the superficially similar destroyer escorts, but the US Navy viewed them as decidedly inferior in all other respects. The Tacoma class had a much larger turning circle than destroyer escorts, lacked sufficient ventilation for warm-weather operations (a reflection of their original British design and its emphasis on operations in the colder North Atlantic Ocean), were criticized as far too hot below decks, and, because of the mercantile style of their hulls, had far less resistance to underwater explosions than ships built to naval standards like the destroyer escorts.

== Post–World War II U.S. ship reclassification ==
After World War II, new-build United States Navy destroyer escorts were referred to as ocean escorts, but retained the hull classification symbol DE. However, other navies, most notably those of NATO countries and the USSR, followed different naming conventions for this type of ship, which resulted in some confusion. To remedy this problem, the 1975 ship reclassification declared ocean escorts (and by extension, destroyer escorts) as frigates (FF). This brought the USN's nomenclature more in line with NATO, and made comparing ship types with the Soviet Union easier. As of 2006, no plans existed for future frigates for the US Navy. USS Zumwalt and the littoral combat ship (LCS) were the main ship types planned in this area. However, by 2017 the Navy had reversed course, and put out a Request For Proposals (RFP) for a new frigate class, temporarily designated FFG(X). One major problem with ship classification is whether to base it on a ship's role (such as escort or air defense), or on its size (such as displacement). One example of this ambiguity is the Ticonderoga-class air-defense ship class, which is classified as cruiser, though it uses the same hull as the Spruance-class destroyers.

== Vietnam War ==
During the Vietnam War, the Republic of Vietnam Navy received two Edsall-class destroyer escorts from the United States.

== US Navy destroyer escort classes ==
Class name	Propulsion	Guns	Torpedoes	Lead ship	Commissioned	Ships built
Evarts (GMT)	diesel - electric	3 × 3in/50	0	USS Evarts (DE-5)	15 April 1943 (Note: the first ship commissioned of the class was HMS Bayntun on 20 January 1943)	97
Buckley (TE)	turbo - electric	3 × 3in/50	3 × 21in	USS Buckley (DE-51)	30 April 1943	148
Cannon (DET)	diesel - electric	3 × 3in/50	3 × 21in	USS Cannon (DE-99)	26 September 1943	72
Edsall (FMR)	geared diesel	3 × 3in/50	3 × 21in	USS Edsall (DE-129)	10 April 1943	85
Rudderow (TEV)	turbo - electric	2 × 5in/38	3 × 21in	USS Rudderow (DE-224)	15 May 1944	22
John C. Butler (WGT)	geared turbine	2 × 5in/38	3 × 21in	USS John C. Butler (DE-339)	31 March 1944	83
Dealey	geared turbine	4 × 3in/50	4 × 21in	USS Dealey (DE-1006)	3 June 1954	13
Claud Jones	diesel	2 × 3in/50	6 × 13in	USS Claud Jones (DE-1033)	10 February 1959	4
Bronstein	geared turbine	2 × 3in/50 Mk33, ASROC	6 × 13in	USS Bronstein (DE-1037)	15 June 1963	2
Garcia	geared turbine	2 × 5in/38		USS Garcia (DE-1040)	21 December 1964	10
Brooke	geared turbine	1 × 5in/38		USS Brooke (DEG-1)	12 March 1966	6
Knox	geared turbine	1 x 5in/54		USS Knox (DE-1052)	12 April 1969	46

== World War II shipbuilding programs ==
total ships in the table: 507DEs + 56APDs

37 Buckleys listed here as Buckleys were converted to APDs after having been commissioned as destroyer escorts. All APDs listed in the table were completed as conversions. Captains were converted before commissioning as DEs.

Builder	State	Evarts + Captain	Buckley + Captain (+Charles Lawrence APDs)	Cannon	Edsall	Rudderow (+Crosley APDs)	Butler	total
(laid down from)		Feb 1942	Jul 1942	Oct 1942	Jun 1942	Jul 1943	Aug 1943	
(launched until)		Feb 1944	May 1944	Aug 1944	Dec 1943	Apr 1944	Aug 1944	
(commissioned from)		Apr 1943	Apr 1943	May 1943	Apr 1943	Dec 1943	Dec 1943	
(commissioned until)		Aug 1944	Jul 1944	Dec 1944	Feb 1944	Sep 1944	Dec 1945	
Consolidated Steel	TX		12 (+6)		47	(+3)	34	93
Bethlehem (Fore River and Hingham)	MA		27 + 46			14 (+23)		87
Bethlehem, San Francisco	CA		12					12
Boston Navy Yard	MA	21 + 31					10	62
Brown Shipbuilding	TX				38		23	61
Federal Shipbuilding and Drydock Company	NJ			36			16	52
Mare Island Navy Yard	CA	31						31
Philadelphia Navy Yard	PA	5 + 1	10			2 (+4)		18
Dravo Corporation	DE, PA		3 (PA)	15 (DE)				18
Charleston Navy Yard	SC		15			2 (+9)		17
Defoe Shipbuilding Company	MI		13			4 (+11)		17
Western Pipe and Steel Company	CA			12				12
Norfolk Navy Yard	VA		10					10
Tampa Shipbuilding Company	FL			9				9
Puget Sound Navy Yard	WA	8						8

company	contract	issued	amount	delivery	description
various navy yards		11/41			DE-1 ... DE-50
Consolidated Steel	OBS378	1/42	$110,426,000	9/43	destroyer escorts DE 129-152
Brown Shipbuilding	OBS403	1/42	$63,558,000	10/43	destroyer escorts DE 238-255
Federal Shipbuilding and Drydock Company	OBS401	1/42	$85,440,000	2/44	destroyer escorts DE 162-197
Dravo Corporation, Wilmington	OBS377	1/42	$52,903,000	4/44	destroyer escorts DE 99-128
Bethlehem, Hingham	OBS376	2/42	$118,800,000	12/43	destroyer escorts DE 51-98
Brown Shipbuilding	OBS335	8/42	$151,833,000	7/44	destroyer escorts DE 382-437
Consolidated Steel	OBS334	8/42	$197,505,000	11/44	destroyer escorts DE 316-381
Bethlehem, San Francisco	OBS331	8/42	$28,427,000	7/44	destroyer vessels DE 633-664
Federal Shipbuilding and Drydock Company	OBS333	8/42	$44,560,000	3/45	destroyer escorts DE 438-515
Bethlehem, Hingham	OBS332	8/42	$155,364,000	8/45	destroyer escorts DE 563-632
Defoe Shipbuilding Company	OBS795	10/42	$54,366,000	9/44	destroyer escorts DE 693-738
Bethlehem, Fore River	OBS840	10/42	$35,365,000	11/44	destroyer escorts DE 675-692
Consolidated Steel	OBS844	11/42	$42,372,000	3/44	destroyer escorts DE 789-904
Dravo Corporation, Pittsburgh	OBS841	11/42	$11,845,000	4/44	destroyer escorts DE 665-674
Western Pipe and Steel Company	OBS842	11/42	$44,132,000	9/44	destroyer escorts DE 739-762
Tampa Shipbuilding Company	OBS843	11/42	$31,779,000	12/44	destroyer escorts DE 763-788

Data from "Ship's Data U.S. Naval Vessels"

Class	Company	Contract	Value	Hulls
WGT	C.Steel	8/42	$2,043,000	339-368
WGT	federal	8/42	$2,785,000	438-450, 508-510
WGT	Brown	8/42	$2,517,000	402-424
FMR	C.Steel	1/42	$1,988,000	129-149
FMR	C.Steel	8/42	$1,539,000	316-336
FMR	Brown	1/42	$2,921,000	250-252
FMR	Brown	8/42	$2,183,000	389-400

hull numbers for WGT and FMR are still incomplete, price of $2,157 for Brown/WGT DE-423 is assumed to be a typo

other classes missing (work in progress)

From the same document, List of Naval Vessels, pp. 11:

Type	Hulls	Cancelled Hulls
GMT	5-50	
TE	51-98	
DET	99-113	114-128
FMR	129-152	
TE	153-161	
DET	162-197	
TE	198-223	
TEV	224-237	
FMR	238-255	
GMT	256-283	284-300
GMT	301-307	308-315
FMR	316-338	
WGT	339-372	373-381
FMR	382-401	
WGT	402-424	425-437
WGT	438-450	451-507
WGT	508-510	511-515
GMT	516-530	
WGT	531-542	543-562
TE	563-578	
TEV	579-606	607-632
TE	633-636	
GMT	637-644	
TEV		645-664
TE	665-673	
TEV	674	
TE	675-683	
TEV	684-692	
TE	693-705	
TEV	706-722	723-738
DET	739-750	751-762
DET	763-771	772-788
TE	789-800	801-1005

== Captain-class frigates of the Royal Navy ==
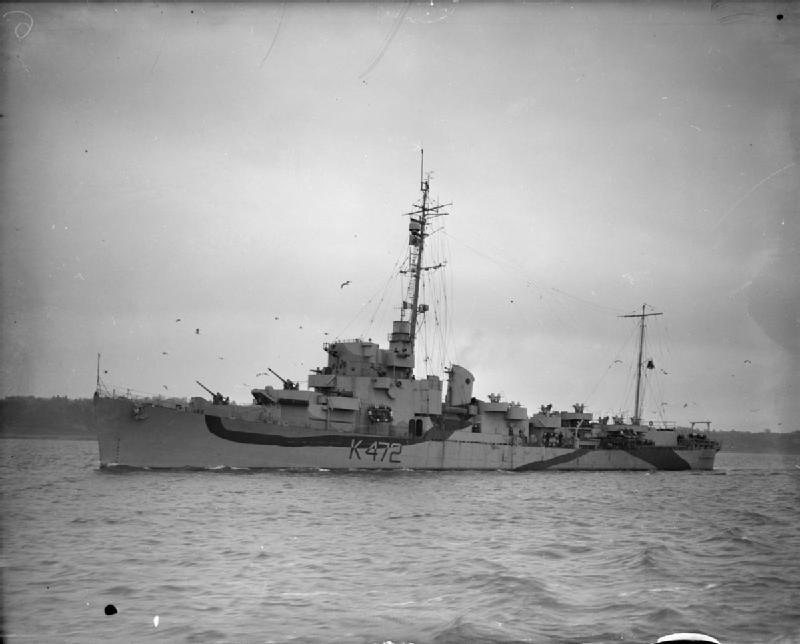
HMS Dacres, converted to act as a headquarters ship during Operation Neptune

The Captain class was a designation given to 78 frigates of the Royal Navy, constructed in the United States, launched in 1942–1943 and delivered to the United Kingdom under the provisions of the Lend-Lease agreement (under which the United States supplied the United Kingdom and other Allied nations with materiel between 1941 and 1945), they were drawn from two subclasses of the destroyer escort (originally British destroyer escort) classification: 32 from the Evarts subclass and 46 from the Buckley subclass. Upon reaching the UK, the ships were substantially modified by the Royal Navy, including removal of torpedo tubes, making them distinct from the US Navy destroyer escort ships.

Captain-class frigates acted in the roles of convoy escorts, antisubmarine warfare vessels, coastal forces control frigates and headquarters ships for the Normandy landings. During the course of World War II, this class participated in the sinking of at least 34 German submarines and a number of other hostile craft with 15 of the 78 Captain-class frigates being either sunk or written off as a constructive total loss.

In the postwar period, all of the surviving Captain-class frigates except one (HMS Hotham) were returned to the US Navy before the end of 1947 to reduce the amount payable under the provisions of the Lend-Lease agreement; the last such frigate was returned to United States custody in March 1956.

== Free French ==
Six Cannon-class destroyer escorts were built for the Free French Navy. Although initially transferred under the Lend-Lease Act, these ships were permanently transferred under the Mutual Defense Assistance Program (MDAP).

- FFL Algérien (F-1), ex-Cronin (DE-107)
- FFL Sénégalais (F-2), ex-Corbestier (DE-106)
- FFL Somali (F-3), ex-Somali (DE-111)
- FFL Hova (F-4), ex-Hova (DE-110)
- FFL Marocain (F-5), ex-Marocain (DE-109)
- FFL Tunisien (F-6), ex-Crosley (DE-108)

== Mutual Defense Assistance Program – Post WWII ==
Under the MDAP the destroyer escorts leased to the Free French were permanently transferred to the French Navy. In addition, the following navies also acquired DEs:

=== Republic of China Navy (Taiwan) ===
DE-47, DE-6

=== French Navy ===
DE-1007, DE-1008, DE-1009, DE-1010, DE-1011, DE-1012, DE-1013, DE-1016, DE-1017, DE-1018, DE1019

=== Hellenic Navy ===
DE-173, DE-766, DE-768, DE-193

=== Italian Navy ===
DE-1020, DE-1031

=== Japanese Maritime Self-Defense Force ===
DE-168, DE-169

=== Philippine Navy ===
DE-168, DE-169, DE-170, DE-770, DE-771, DE-251, DE-637

=== Portuguese Navy ===
DE-509, DE-1032, DE-1039, DE-1042, DE-1046

=== Republic of Korea Navy ===
DE-770, DE-771

=== Royal Navy ===
DE-574 (Note: DE-574 was originally provided to the United Kingdom under the Lend-Lease (Public Law 77-11) scheme, DE-574 was returned to the US custody under the provisions of the Lend-Lease scheme on the 25 April 1952 and simultaneously transferred back to the United Kingdom under the Mutual Defence Assistance Program.)

=== Royal Netherlands Navy ===
USS Burrows (DE-105), USS Rinehart (DE-196), USS Gustafson (DE-182), USS O'Neill (DE-188), USS Eisner (DE-192), USS Stern (DE-187)

=== Royal Thai Navy ===
DE-746

=== National Navy of Uruguay ===
DE-166, DE-189,

== Comparison with contemporary frigates ==
The table below compares destroyer escorts and frigates designed for similar missions.

Name	Date	Nation	Displacement	Speed	Number built	Notes
River-class frigate	1942	UK	1,370 tons	20 knots	151	
Type A Kai kaibōkan	1943	Japan	870 tons	19 knots	18	
FMR class	1943	US	1,200 tons	21 knots	85	
Evarts-class	1943	US	1,140 tons	21 knots	72	
Buckley-class	1943	US	1,400 tons	23 knots	102	
Cannon-class	1943	US	1,240 tons	21 knots	72	
Tacoma-class frigate	1943	US	1,430 tons	20 knots	96	
Type B kaibōkan	1943	Japan	940 tons	19 knots	37	
Loch-class frigate	1944	UK	1,435 tons	20 knots	30	anti-submarine
WGT class	1944	US	1,350 tons	24 knots	87	
TEV class	1944	US	1,450 tons	24 knots	22	
Bay-class frigate	1945	UK	1,580 tons	20 knots	26	anti-aircraft, built on Loch class hulls
Type 15 frigate	1952	UK	2,300 tons	31 knots	23	Rebuilds of War Emergency Programme destroyers into anti-submarine frigates
Dealey class	1954	US	1,450 tons	25 knots	13	
Type E50 frigate	1955	France	1,290 tons	28 knots	4	fast
Type 14 frigate	1955	UK	1,180 tons	24 knots	15	Also known as Blackwood-class. "second-rate" anti-submarine warfare frigates. Cheaper to produce than Type 12.
St. Laurent class	1955	Canada	2,263 tons	28 knots	7	anti-submarine
Type B	1956	Japan	1,070 tons	25 knots	2	diesel
Type 12 frigate	1956	UK	2,150 tons	31 knots	8 (Note: Includes 2 built for India)	Also known as Whitby class. Anti-submarine frigates for combating fast submarines
Type E52 frigate	1956	France	1,295 tons	28 knots	14	fast
Almirante Clemente-class light destroyer	1956	Venezuela	1,300 tons	32 knots	6	fast
Type 61 frigate	1957	UK	2,170 tons	24 knots	4	Salisbury class. aircraft direction
Centauro-class frigate	1957	Italy	1,807 tons	26 knots	4	
Type 41 frigate	1957	UK	2,300 tons	24 knots	7	Leopard class. anti-aircraft escort for convoys
Azopardo-class frigate	1957	Argentina	1,160 tons	20 knots	2	
Restigouche class	1958	Canada	2,366 tons	28 knots	7	anti-submarine
Claud Jones class	1959	US	1,450 tons	22 knots	4	
Type 12M frigate	1960	UK	2,380 tons	30 knots	14 (Note: Includes 2 built for New Zealand and 3 built for South Africa)	Rothesay class. ."Modified" Type 12. Anti-submarine
Köln-class frigate	1961	Germany	2,100 tons	30 knots	6	fast
River-class destroyer escort	1961	Australia	2,100 tons	30 knots	6	Originally designated as anti-submarine frigates, later re-designated as destroyer escorts. Four built to British Type 12M design, two built to Type 12I design
Isuzu-class destroyer escort	1961	Japan	1,490 tons	25 knots	4	
Type 81 frigate	1961	UK	2,300 tons	28 knots	7	Tribal-class. Originally multi-role ("general purpose") sloops for Middle East. Reclassified as "second class" frigates.
Bergamini-class frigate	1961	Italy	1,410 tons	26 knots	4	
Commandant Rivière-class frigate	1962	France	1,750 tons	25 knots	13	dual purpose
Mackenzie class	1962	Canada	2,366 tons	28 knots	4	anti-submarine
Hvidbjørnen-class frigate	1962	Denmark	1,345 tons	18 knots	4	fishery protection
Type 12I frigate	1963	UK	2,450 tons	30 knots	28 (Note: Includes 2 built for New Zealand)	Leander class. "Improved" Type 12. General purpose. Also built as Nilgiri-class frigate (India, 6), Condell-class (Chile, 2), River-class (Australia,2)
Bronstein class	1963	US	2,360 tons	26 knots	2	
Garcia class	1964	US	2,620 tons	27 knots	10	
Oslo-class frigate	1966	Norway	1,450 tons	25 knots	5	
Brooke class	1966	US	2,640 tons	27 knots	6	guided missile
Peder Skram-class frigate	1966	Denmark	2,030 tons	28 knots	2	fast
Van Speijk-class frigate	1967	Netherlands	2,200 tons	28 knots	6	Dutch version of the British Leander
Alpino-class frigate	1968	Italy	2,000 tons	28 knots	2	
Alvand-class frigate	1968	Iran	1,110 tons	40 knots	4	
Knox class	1969	US	3,011 tons	27 knots	46	
Chikugo-class destroyer escort	1971	Japan	1,470 tons	25 knots	11	

== Surviving destroyer escorts ==
Four destroyer escorts are preserved as museum ships, while others remain in active service.

- The Edsall-class destroyer escort USS Stewart (DE-238) is preserved in Galveston, Texas.
- The Cannon-class destroyer escort USS Slater (DE-766) is preserved in Albany, New York.
- The Cannon-class destroyer escort BNS Bauru (BE-4), formerly USS McAnn (DE-179) is preserved in Rio de Janeiro, Brazil.
- The modified Rudderow-class destroyer escort, ARC Cordoba (DT-15), formerly USS Ruchamkin (APD-89) is preserved in Tocancipa, Colombia.
- The Cannon-class destroyer escort HTMS Pin Klao (DE-1), formerly USS Hemminger (DE-746), was decommissioned from the Royal Thai Navy on 30 September 2025. She was the last of World War II era destroyer escort active in any navy. Her fate is yet to be determined.
- The Japanese Maritime Self-Defense Force operates six Abukuma-class destroyer escorts.

== See also ==
- The Enemy Below, a movie filmed on a DE
- List of destroyers of the Second World War
- List of escort vessel classes of the Second World War
- List of Escorteurs of the French Navy
- List of frigates
  - List of Captain class frigates
  - List of frigates of the Second World War
  - List of frigates of the United States Navy subset of above with hull numbers DE/FF 1037 and higher plus all DEG/FFGs because of the United States Navy 1975 ship reclassification
- Naval tactics

== Notes and references ==
=== Bibliography ===
- Blackman, Raymond V.B. (1970–71). Jane's Fighting Ships. Jane's Yearbooks.
- Collingwood, Donald (1998). The Captain class frigates in the second world war: an operational history of the American-built destroyer escorts serving under the White Ensign from 1943–46. Leo Cooper. ISBN 978-0-85052-615-8.
- Cooney, David M. (1980). Ships, Aircraft and Weapons of the United States Navy. United States Government Printing Office.
- Franklin, Bruce Hampton (1999). The Buckley-Class Destroyer Escorts. Chatham Publishing. ISBN 1-86176-118-X.
- Friedman, Norman (1987). U.S. Small Combatants: An Illustrated Design History. Annapolis, Maryland: United States Naval Institute. ISBN 978-0870217135.
- Friedman, Norman (2004). US Destroyers: An Illustrated Design History (Revised ed.). Annapolis: Naval Institute Press. ISBN 1-55750-442-3.
- Lenton, H T. (1998). British and Empire Warships of the Second World War. Greenhill Books/Naval Institute Press. ISBN 1-85367-277-7.
- Lenton, H.T. (1974). British Escort Ships. Macdonald and Jane's. ISBN 0-356-08062-5.
- Morison, Samuel Eliot (1956). History of United States Naval Operations in World War II. Vol. 10: The Atlantic Battle Won, May 1943 – May 1945. Little, Brown and Company. ISBN 978-0316583107.
- NAVPERS (1955). Warship Identification Manual. United States Government Printing Office.
- Potter, E.B.; Nimitz, Chester W. (1960). Sea Power. Prentice-Hall. ISBN 9780137968701.
- Silverstone, Paul H. (1968). U.S. Warships of World War II. Doubleday & Company.
- Watts, Anthony J. (1966). Japanese Warships of World War II. Doubleday & Company.

=== Online sources ===
- Mooney, James L. "Hotham". Dictionary of American Naval Fighting Ships. The Naval Historical Foundation. OCLC 2794587. Archived from the original on 31 March 2004.
