= Escort (album) =

Studio album by Escort
- Released: 2011
- Genre: Nu-disco
- Length: 52:41
- Label: Escort
- Producer: Dan Balis; Eugene Cho

Escort chronology
| Escort (2011) | Animal Nature (2015) |

Professional ratings
Review scores
| Source | Rating |
|---|---|
| AllMusic | 4.5/5 stars |
| Consequence of Sound | C− |
| Pitchfork | 7.7/10 |
| Slant Magazine | 3/5 stars |
| Spin | 8/10 |

Escort is the first album by an American nu-disco band Escort. Rolling Stone ranked it 40th on its list of the top 50 albums of 2012.

== Track listing ==
Escort track listing
| No. | Title | Length |
|---|---|---|
| 1. | "Caméleon Chameleon" | 5:26 |
| 2. | "Cocaine Blues" | 4:07 |
| 3. | "Makeover" | 4:09 |
| 4. | "A Sailboat in the Moonlight" | 4:18 |
| 5. | "Why Oh Why" | 3:54 |
| 6. | "Starlight" | 4:36 |
| 7. | "A Bright New Life" | 5:53 |
| 8. | "All Through the Night" | 4:18 |
| 9. | "Love in Indigo" | 3:41 |
| 10. | "All That She Is" | 4:42 |
| 11. | "Karawane" | 7:37 |
| Total length: | | 52:41 |
