= USS Rinehart =

Cannon-class destroyer escort

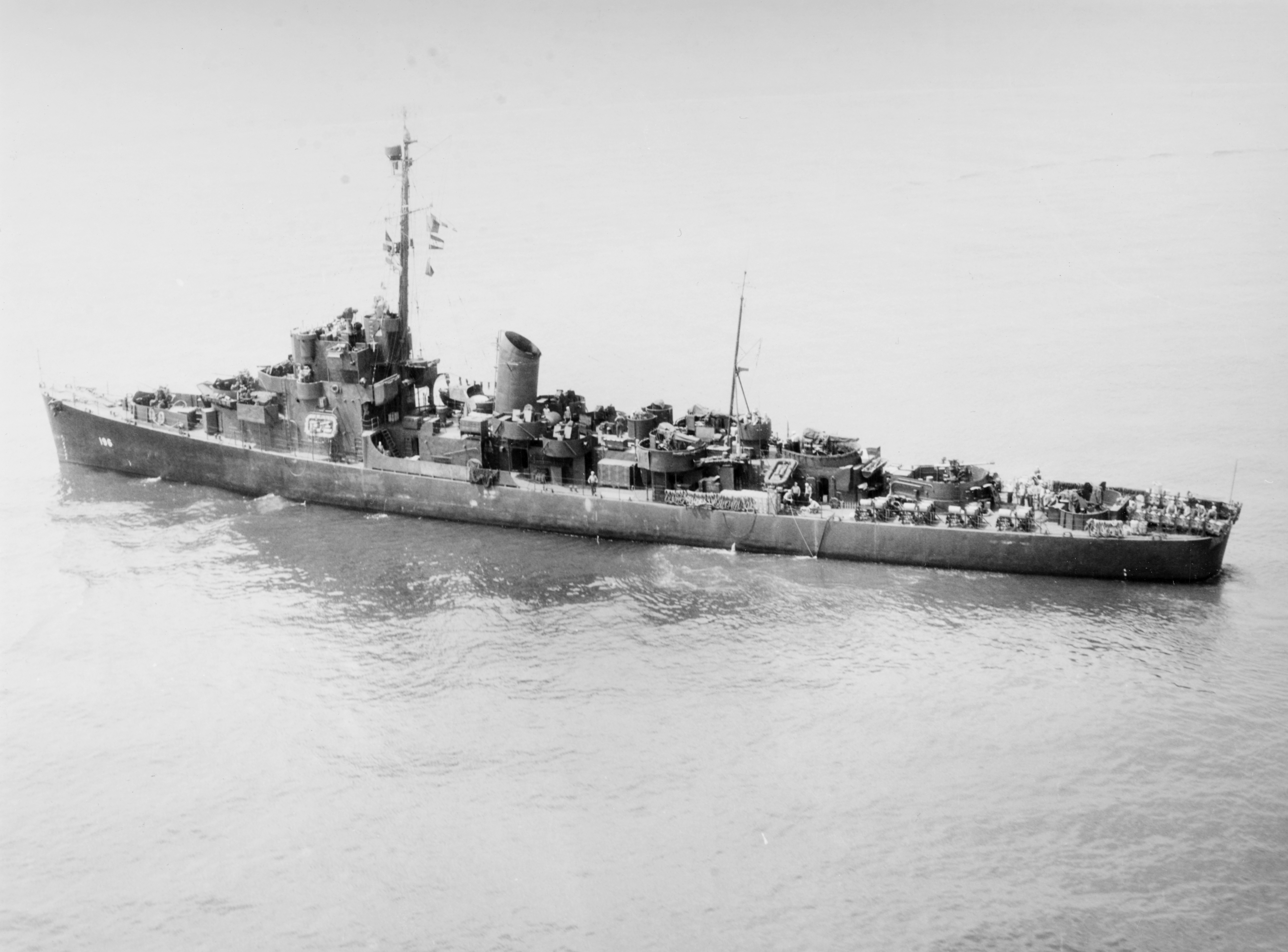
- USS Rinehart (DE-196) off New York City, 8 June 1945

History

United States
- Name: USS Rinehart
- Namesake: Clark Franklin Rinehart
- Builder: Federal Shipbuilding and Drydock Company
- Laid down: 21 October 1943
- Launched: 9 January 1944
- Commissioned: 12 February 1944
- Decommissioned: 17 July 1946
- Stricken: 26 September 1950
- Fate: Transferred to the Netherlands, 1 June 1950

Netherlands
- Name: HNLMS De Bitter (F807)
- Acquired: 1 June 1950
- Decommissioned: December 1967
- Fate: Scrapped, February 1968

General characteristics
- Class & type: Cannon-class destroyer escort
- Displacement: 1,240 long tons (1,260 t) standard; 1,620 long tons (1,646 t) full
- Length: 306 ft (93 m) o/a; 300 ft (91 m) w/l
- Beam: 36 ft 10 in (11.23 m)
- Draft: 11 ft 8 in (3.56 m)
- Propulsion: 4 × GM Mod. 16-278A diesel engines with electric drive, 6,000 shp (4,474 kW), 2 screws
- Speed: 21 knots (39 km/h; 24 mph)
- Range: 10,800 nmi (20,000 km) at 12 kn (22 km/h; 14 mph)
- Complement: 15 officers and 201 enlisted
- Armament: 3 × single Mk.22 3"/50 caliber guns; 1 × twin 40 mm Mk.1 AA gun; 8 × 20 mm Mk.4 AA guns; 3 × 21-inch (533 mm) torpedo tubes; 1 × Hedgehog Mk.10 anti-submarine mortar (144 rounds); 8 × Mk.6 depth charge projectors; 2 × Mk.9 depth charge tracks

USS Rinehart (DE-196) was a Cannon-class destroyer escort built for the United States Navy during World War II. She served in the Atlantic Ocean and Pacific Ocean and provided escort service against submarine and air attack for Navy vessels and convoys. The ship entered the reserves after the end of the war, and in 1950 was transferred to the Royal Netherlands Navy, where she served under the name De Bitter until 1967. She was sold for scrap in 1968.

== Namesake ==
Clark Franklin Rinehart was born on 30 May 1910 in Ridgeway, Missouri. He enlisted in the U.S. Naval Reserve on 30 April 1937, was appointed aviation cadet on 22 July 1937, designated naval aviator on 8 June 1938, appointed ensign for aviation duties in the U.S. Naval Reserve ranking from 1 August 1938, commissioned ensign in the United States Navy ranking from 1 June 1939; and appointed lieutenant (junior grade) for temporary service ranking from 1 November 1941. He was assigned successively to the Naval Air Station Pensacola, Florida; Bombing Squadron 2 on board USS Lexington; and Fighting Squadron 2 again on board Lexington.

He disappeared during the Battle of the Coral Sea on 8 May 1942 piloting a Grumman F4F Wildcat in heavy combat in Lexington's VF-2 section (section-named "Doris White") along with the second pilot in VF-2, Newton H. Mason. Both Rinehart's and Newton's fates are unknown. Rinehart attacked the Japanese carrier Shōhō and its complement of destroyers with Lexington's air group on 7 May 1942, the day before being killed in action while protecting the USS Lexington from attack, and was previously credited with strafing and damaging a surfaced Japanese submarine. Rinehart was posthumously awarded the Distinguished Flying Cross.

Rinehart left a widow, Mrs. Dorothy Ruth Rinehart (née Dupuy) (1913–2009), who never remarried; but who had at least one known child with LTJD Rinehart before he was killed in action.

== Construction ==
The ship was laid down by the Federal Shipbuilding and Drydock Company, Newark, New Jersey, on 21 October 1943; launched on 9 January 1944, sponsored by Mrs. Dorothy Ruth Rinehart; and commissioned at New York on 12 February 1944. Later this ship was commanded by future football coach Woody Hayes.

== World War II North Atlantic operations ==
Following shakedown off Bermuda and brief service as a school ship out of Norfolk, Virginia, Rinehart commenced her primary work as a convoy escort when she sailed to New York on 8 May 1944 to pick up the New York section of a North Africa-bound convoy. Arriving Bizerte, Tunisia, on 1 June, she steamed for New York nine days later with a return convoy. She made a second voyage from Norfolk to Bizerte and back to New York between 24 July and 7 September.

Rinehart cleared New York on 14 October 1944 for the first of five convoy escort voyages to ports in Great Britain and France. She sailed from New York to Liverpool, England, and back (14 October to 9 November 1944); from Boston, Massachusetts, to Plymouth, England, to New York (2 to 31 December 1944); from New York to Liverpool and back (18 January to 14 February 1945); from Boston to Le Havre, France, and Southampton, England, and back to New York (8 March to 4 April 1945); and from Boston to Gourock, Scotland, and back to New York (24 April to 19 May 1945). During this last voyage, she rescued a man overboard from merchant tanker SS Sea Donon 1 May.

== Transfer to the Pacific Theatre ==
After an overhaul, Rinehart cleared New York with the rest of Escort Division 55 for refresher training at Guantanamo Bay, Cuba. Continuing on to the Pacific, she transited the Panama Canal on 1 July, and, after a stop at San Diego, California, arrived at Pearl Harbor on 21 July.

Following training in Hawaiian waters, Rinehart sailed from Pearl Harbor on 8 August 1945 as escort for an Eniwetok-bound convoy. She delivered her charges safely at that port on 16 August and was assigned to patrol on the barrier line between the convoy lanes. She also served as ready duty ship and on 12 September recovered LCVP-3832 which was adrift off the island.

== End-of-War activity ==
On 26 September 1945, Rinehart headed for Wake Island where she assumed radio and station ship duty upon her arrival the following day. She was relieved of this duty on 4 October and sailed back to Eniwetok by way of Bikini where she replenished three YMS class minesweepers stationed there. The escort revisited Bikini during 19–21 October for a similar mission, then returned to Wake Island on 24 October 1945 to serve as port director and radio ship. During heavy weather on the 28th and 29th, Rinehart barely avoided joining SS Pierre Victory on a coral reef. Her mooring buoys were ripped loose, but skillful maneuvering enabled her to stay clear and aid the merchant ship get off the reef and into safe water to ride out the storm.

Rinehart put to sea from Wake Island on 1 December 1945 and embarked Navy passengers at Eniwetok Atoll for transportation to Pearl Harbor where she arrived on 15 December 1945. After acting as weather station ship off Pearl Harbor, she got underway from that port on 2 February for the east coast of the United States.

== Return to the East Coast ==
Steaming in company with Thornhill (DE-195), she touched at San Pedro, Los Angeles, transited the Panama Canal on 1 March, and arrived in the Boston Navy Yard on 7 March 1946. She cleared Boston Harbor with Thornhill on 13 April and reported for inactivation at Green Cove Springs, Florida, on 16 April 1946.

== Post-War decommissioning ==
She remained in inactive status until 17 July 1946 when she decommissioned and was assigned to the Florida Group of the U.S. Atlantic Reserve Fleet. Rinehart was transferred to the Netherlands under terms of the Military Assistance Program on 1 June 1950. She was struck from the Navy List on 26 September 1950. She served in the Royal Netherlands Navy as HNLMS De Bitter (F807) until retired in December 1967 and sold in February 1968 for scrapping.
