= USS Burrows (DE-105) =

Cannon-class destroyer escort

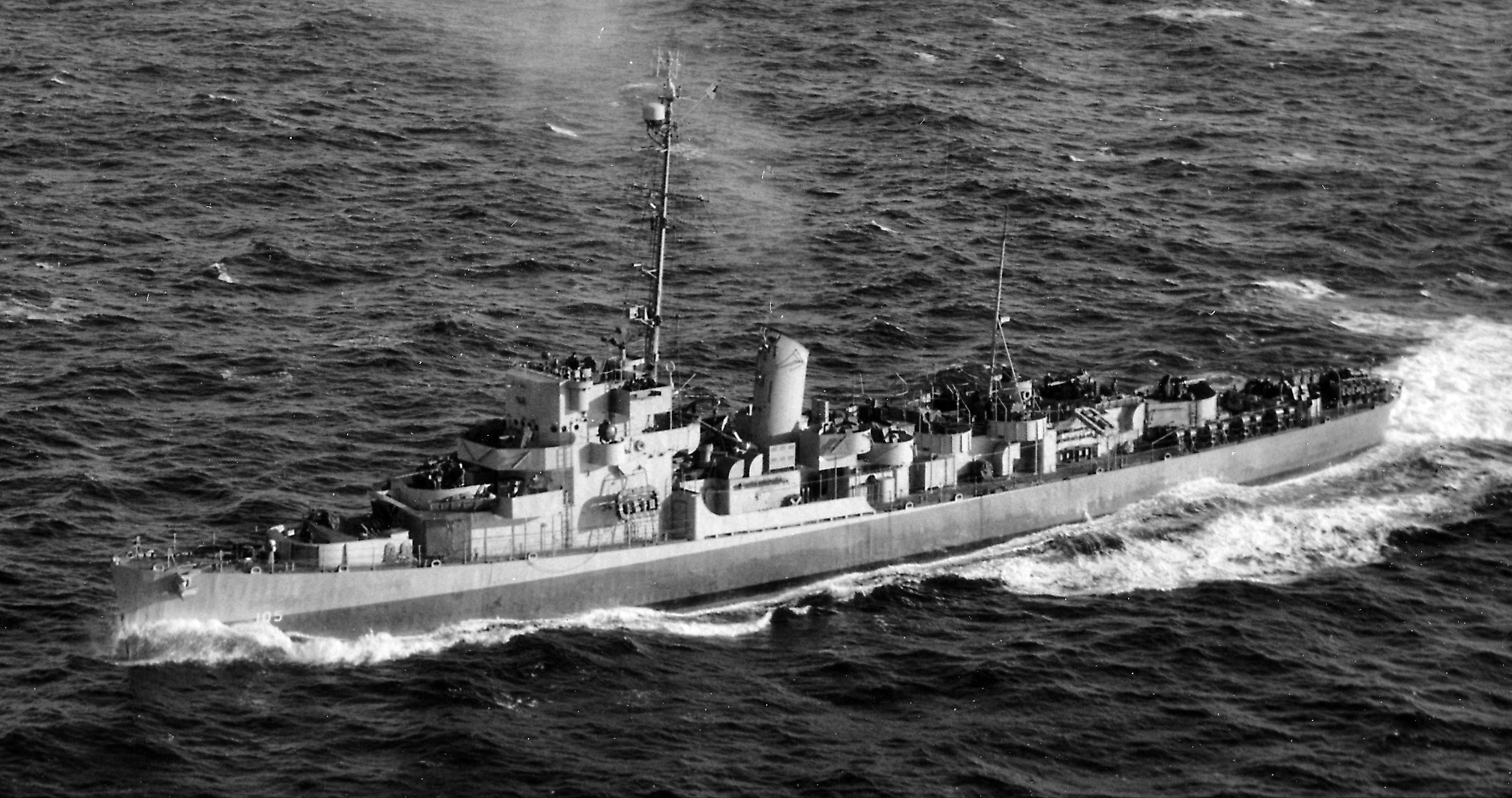

History

United States
- Name: Burrows
- Namesake: William Ward Burrows II
- Builder: Dravo Corporation, Wilmington, Delaware
- Laid down: 20 March 1943
- Launched: 2 October 1943
- Commissioned: 19 December 1943
- Decommissioned: 26 April 1946
- Stricken: 26 September 1950
- Fate: Transferred to the Netherlands (MDAP), 1 June 1950

Netherlands
- Name: HNLMS Van Amstel (F.806)
- Acquired: 1 June 1950
- Out of service: February 1968
- Fate: Sold for scrapping, February 1968

General characteristics
- Class & type: Cannon-class destroyer escort
- Displacement: 1,240 tons
- Length: 306 ft (93 m)
- Beam: 36 ft 8 in (11.2 m)
- Draft: 8 ft 9 in (2.7 m)
- Propulsion: 4 GM Mod. 16-278A diesel engines with electric drive; 4.5 MW (6,000 shp), 2 screws
- Speed: 21 knots (39 km/h)
- Range: 10,800 nmi. at 12 knots
- Complement: 15 officers, 201 enlisted
- Armament: 3 × 3 in (76 mm)/50 guns (3×1); 2 × 40 mm Bofors AA guns (1x2); 8 × 20 mm Oerlikon AA guns (8×1); 3 × Torpedo tubes for 21-inch Mark 15 torpedo (1×3); 8 × depth charge projectors; 1 × Hedgehog anti-submarine mortar; 2 x depth charge tracks

USS Burrows (DE-105) was a Cannon-class destroyer escort built for the U.S. Navy during World War II. She served in both the Atlantic Ocean and the Pacific Ocean, and provided escort service against submarine and air attack for Navy vessels and convoys.

She was laid down at Wilmington, Delaware, on 24 March 1943 by the Dravo Corporation; launched on 2 October 1943; sponsored by Miss Ruth C. Tech; and commissioned on 19 December 1943 at the Philadelphia Navy Yard.

== World War II North Atlantic operations ==
The destroyer escort left Philadelphia, Pennsylvania, on 30 December 1943 for shakedown training off Bermuda and returned to Philadelphia on 9 February 1944 for post-shakedown repairs before steaming to Norfolk, Virginia, for duty as a training ship for prospective destroyer escort crews. After less than three weeks, she received orders to New York City to await assignment to her first convoy.

On 27 February, the warship sailed for the first of 16 transatlantic crossings. In company with Marblehead, Milwaukee, four destroyers, and seven other destroyer escorts, Burrows sailed through the cold and stormy North Atlantic and arrived safely in Belfast, Northern Ireland. She proceeded to NOB Derry to join Escort Division 28 (CortDiv22); and, on 17 March, Burrows began her return voyage to New York. Upon arriving there on 28 March, she entered the navy yard for an overhaul.

Burrows' typical cycle for escort duty was to steam overseas, return to New York for overhaul, undergo brief refresher training, and then steam back to New York to join another convoy. She served in the screen of a convoy to England in April and, upon return to New York, she interrupted her convoy-escort routine to conduct experiments at Quonset Point, Rhode Island, with the Navy's FXR (foxer) gear, an underwater noise-making device that trailed behind ships as a defense against German acoustic torpedoes. Back in New York by early June, Burrows stood out of port on the 13th with her longest and largest convoy, more than a hundred ships bound for Bizerte, Tunisia. The voyage took the convoy through the Strait of Gibraltar, where reports of Luftwaffe attacks prompted Burrows and the other escorts to lay smoke screens twice daily over the ships. Although German bombers passed within two miles, they did not strike; and the convoy arrived on 1 July. Burrows sailed on 10 July for the United States.

Following overhaul, the warship steamed to Casco Bay, Maine, for extended training in torpedo evasion techniques. On 20 August, the destroyer escort got underway for New London, Connecticut, where she put this training to good use during service as a practice target for American submarines. For 34 days, dummy torpedoes passed under Burrows while prospective commanding officers and submarine crews sharpened their fighting skills.

== Sailing her fourth convoy ==
Burrows departed New York again on 6 October with her fourth convoy. By this time, the German submarine strategy had changed. During her earlier trips, the U-boats were attacked principally in the western and middle Atlantic. Later in the war, as the German effort faltered and the Allies invaded Europe, Dönitz moved his submarines closer to their home bases and concentrated operations in the mid-eastern Atlantic, the Irish Sea, and the English Channel. Burrows' convoy, however, encountered no German U-boats while steaming through the danger zone and arrived safely in Liverpool, England, on 17 October.

The destroyer escort made three more convoy trips before the end of March 1945. Once when she was only a few days out of New York on her seventh eastward crossing, high winds and heavy seas battered her convoy severely. Two of the convoy's merchant ships, SS Lone Jack and SS Frontenac Victory, collided. Burrows stood by the badly damaged ships for nine hours to render assistance, but the ships managed to stay afloat through the night. The night hours visited even more excitement on the warship after a fire broke out in the muffler spaces above her own machinery. Fortunately, her well-drilled damage control parties rapidly extinguished the flames before the ship suffered any serious damage.

== Damaged in rough North Atlantic seas ==
In the morning, a westbound convoy appeared on the horizon, and two of its escorts relieved Burrows of her standby duties, enabling her to catch up to her own convoy by the next day. The remainder of the trip passed without incident, and the ships arrived in Liverpool on 11 March. Heavy weather again tormented Burrows' return convoy. On 23 March, a huge wave tore off her forward 3-inch gun shield, ripping two holes in the forecastle deck. In spite of the heavy pounding, Burrows maintained her station while accomplishing temporary repairs; and, on 25 March, she steamed into the safety of New York harbor.

== Her last eastbound convoy ==
Burrows departed New York on 16 April with her eighth and last eastbound convoy. The crossing was easy; and – after dropping one part of the convoy in Weymouth, England, and delivering the rest to Le Havre, France – Burrows returned to Southampton to prepare for her return voyage. On 8 May, while she transited the Atlantic, hostilities with Germany ended. During her 16 transatlantic trips, Burrows had escorted over 500 ships without having one of her convoys suffer a single loss from enemy action.

== Transferred to the Pacific Theatre ==
With the Atlantic free of the U-boat menace, Burrows was needed in the Pacific. On 8 June, she began the westward voyage, pausing first at Culebra Island in Puerto Rico for shore bombardment exercises and then at Guantanamo Bay, Cuba, for refresher training. Finally, she carried out depth charge exercises with a bottomed submarine in Gonaïves Bay, Haiti, before transiting the Panama Canal on 28 June. After a short repair period in San Diego, California, the destroyer escort headed west, arriving in Pearl Harbor on 19 July. There, she underwent a strenuous training program designed to bring the warship to her fighting peak before she met the Japanese. On 6 August, Burrows left for Eniwetok in the Marshall Islands. While she was anchored in Eniwetok lagoon on 15 August, the message arrived announcing the end of hostilities with Japan.

== End-of-War operations ==
Although the war was over, Burrows' work was not. She carried out an antisubmarine sweep around Truk, in the Caroline Islands, until 23 August, then moved to Leyte and Cebu in the Philippine Islands to pick up a convoy carrying occupation troops to Japan. The convoy began the cruise on 2 September. On the morning of 8 September, Burrows steamed into Tokyo Bay which was still filled with the ships of the U.S. 3rd Fleet which had anchored there for the formal surrender ceremony. Four days later, the escort left Tokyo to chaperone a group of LSTs to Okinawa. Enemy submarines and aircraft no longer presented a threat, but the thousands of anchored or floating mines in the water were a hazard to the convoys and had to be destroyed by the escorts.

On 15 September, Burrows escorted her convoy into Buckner Bay, turned, and left port immediately to escape approaching Typhoon Ida. The warship returned to Buckner Bay on the 18th to join another LST group bound for Honshū where they arrived a week later. Burrows tied up alongside USS Telamon for a repair period that was interrupted by another storm-evasion cruise. Following completion of the availability, Burrows set out to sea on 8 October for Leyte Gulf with a third LST group. After another delay due to still another typhoon evasion, the escort and convoy arrived safely on 20 October. Burrows' longest cruise in Pacific waters began in the southern Philippines on 28 October and took her to Aomori on the northernmost tip of Honshū and then to Otaru in southern Hokkaidō. After stopping at both ports, Burrows rendezvoused with LST Flotilla 29 and returned with the ships to Yokohama.

== Mopping up in the Philippines ==
Shortly after she tied up in Yokohama, the destroyer escort received orders to Manila Bay and thence to Guiuan, Samar, to embark five officers and 58 men of the Philippine Army and two Japanese prisoners of war. These troops were being dispatched to Borongan to attempt to force the surrender of Japanese soldiers in the area. On the morning of 12 December, Burrows disembarked her passengers and stood by to await developments. Four days later, the escort recovered all her original passengers as well as 75 Japanese prisoners and got underway for Tacloban, Leyte, where she discharged all the troops and prisoners before returning to Guiuan.

During the remainder of December 1945 and throughout January 1946, Burrows was either at anchor in Guiuan Harbor or on weather patrol. On 31 January, the ship received orders to join CortDiv 16 to return to the United States. After a stop in Pearl Harbor on 13 February, Burrows continued on to San Pedro, California, where she tied up on the 23d. In March, the destroyer escort steamed to Norfolk, Virginia, to prepare for inactivation that was completed in Green Cove Springs, Florida. There, she was placed out of commission, in reserve, on 14 June 1946.

== Post-War decommissioning ==
In 1950, Burrows was designated for transfer to the Netherlands under the Mutual Defense Aid Program (MDAP). Towed to Boston, Massachusetts, in February for overhaul, she was transferred to the Netherlands government on 1 June 1950, and her name was struck from the Navy List on 26 September 1950. Renamed HNLMS Van Amstel, she served for 17 more years under the Dutch flag until the Royal Netherlands Navy declared her to be excess to their needs in 1968 and sold her to Simons Scheepssloperij N.V. of Rotterdam for scrapping.
