= USS Stern =

Cannon-class destroyer escort

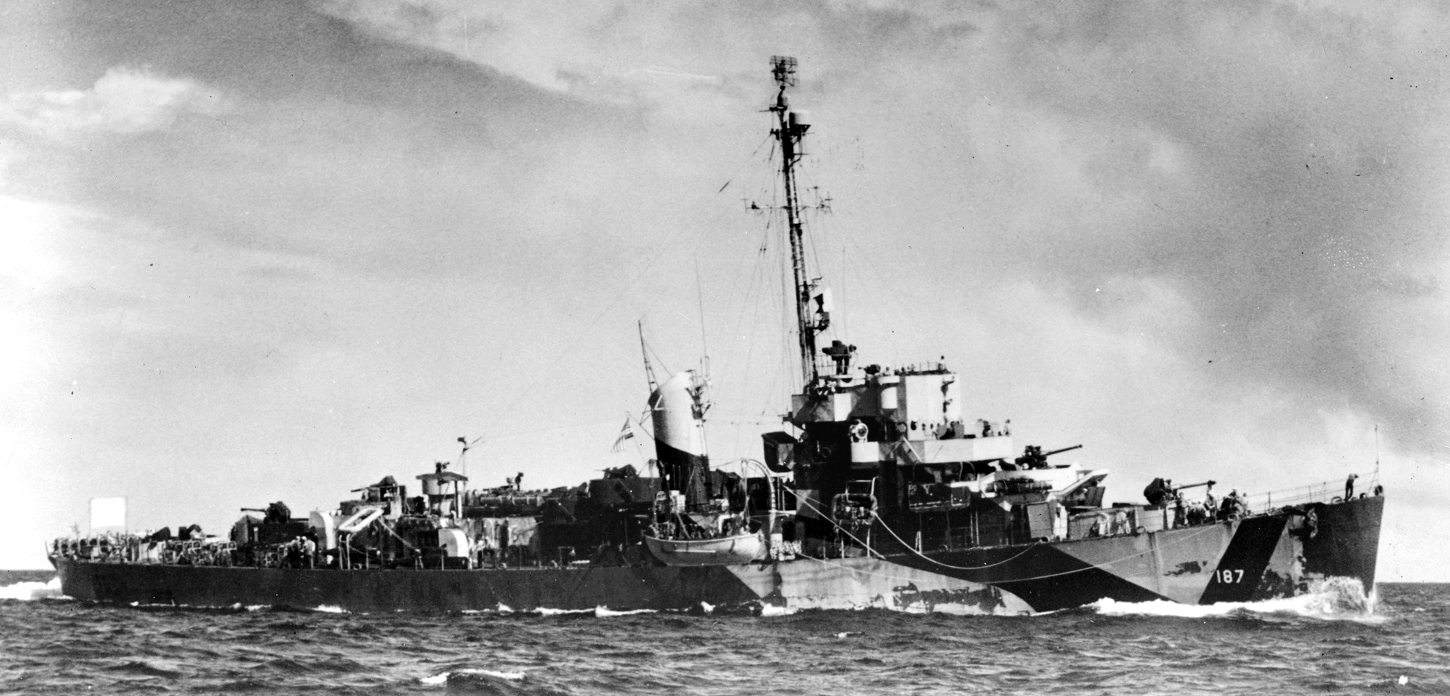

History

United States
- Name: USS Stern
- Namesake: Charles M. Stern, Jr.
- Builder: Federal Shipbuilding and Drydock Company, Newark, New Jersey
- Laid down: 12 August 1943
- Launched: 31 October 1943
- Commissioned: 1 December 1943
- Decommissioned: 26 April 1946
- Stricken: 7 March 1951
- Honors and awards: 3 battle stars (World War II)
- Fate: Transferred to the Netherlands, 1 March 1951

Netherlands
- Name: Hr.Ms. Van Zijll (F811)
- Acquired: 1 March 1951
- Fate: Returned to the US Navy, 1967; Sold for scrapping, 1968

General characteristics
- Class & type: Cannon-class destroyer escort
- Displacement: 1,240 long tons (1,260 t) standard; 1,620 long tons (1,646 t) full
- Length: 306 ft (93 m) o/a; 300 ft (91 m) w/l
- Beam: 36 ft 10 in (11.23 m)
- Draft: 11 ft 8 in (3.56 m)
- Propulsion: 4 × GM Mod. 16-278A diesel engines with electric drive, 6,000 shp (4,474 kW), 2 screws
- Speed: 21 knots (39 km/h; 24 mph)
- Range: 10,800 nmi (20,000 km) at 12 kn (22 km/h; 14 mph)
- Complement: 15 officers and 201 enlisted
- Armament: 3 × single Mk.22 3"/50 caliber guns; 1 × twin 40 mm Mk.1 AA gun; 8 × 20 mm Mk.4 AA guns; 3 × 21-inch (533 mm) torpedo tubes; 1 × Hedgehog Mk.10 anti-submarine mortar (144 rounds); 8 × Mk.6 depth charge projectors; 2 × Mk.9 depth charge tracks

USS Stern (DE-187) was a Cannon-class destroyer escort in service with the United States Navy from 1943 to 1946. In 1951, she was transferred to the Royal Netherlands Navy, where she served as Hr.Ms. Van Zijll (F811) until 1967. She was scrapped in 1968.

== History ==
=== United States Navy (1943-1951) ===
She was named in honor of Charles M. Stern, Jr., who was on duty in battleship USS Oklahoma on 9 April 1941 and was killed when the Japanese attacked Pearl Harbor on 7 December 1941. The ship was laid down on 12 August 1943 by the Federal Shipbuilding and Drydock Co., Newark, New Jersey; launched on 31 October 1943; sponsored by Mrs. Joan M. Stern; and commissioned on 1 December 1943.

==== Battle of the Atlantic ====
Stern held her shakedown cruise off Bermuda and returned to New York for post-shakedown availability. After a short training period off Casco Bay, Maine, she escorted a convoy to Ireland and returned with another to New York. She stood out of that port, on 23 March 1944, with a convoy for North Africa and arrived at Casablanca on 2 April. On 7 May, she sailed for home with a return convoy and arrived at New York on the 17th. Stern made another round trip to Ireland, via Bermuda from 8 June to 2 August, and one more to Bizerte, Tunisia, which ended in New York on 7 October.

==== Pacific War ====
Stern sailed for the West Coast on 23 October and arrived at San Diego, California, on 10 November. Routed westward, she arrived at Pearl Harbor on 23 November, and after calling at the Marshall Islands, arrived at Ulithi, Caroline Islands, on 12 December. She was assigned to the at-sea logistics group (Task Group 30.8) of the U.S. 3rd Fleet. Stern operated with the 3rd Fleet from 16 to 25 December and from 29 December 1944 to 28 January 1945, supporting operations liberating Luzon. The ship returned to Ulithi on 8 February and was attached to the screen of the attack transport group of the task force, which would invade Iwo Jima. The force arrived off that island early on the morning of the 19th, and the assault groups began landing under intense hostile fire. From that morning until 1 March, the escort protected American transports off Iwo Jima.

On that day, Stern was routed via Guam to the Philippine Islands. She arrived there on 8 March, was assigned to the screen of Task Group 51.1, the Western Islands Attack Group, and sailed for the Ryukyu Islands on 21 March.

Stern screened the attack transports heading for Kerama Retto and arrived there on 26 March. She then performed antisubmarine duty off the islands until 5 April, when she was ordered to escort a resupply convoy to Guam. From there, she sailed to Leyte to join another Okinawa-bound task unit and was back off the island on 18 April. This tour of Okinawa was unbroken until July. On 13 and 18 May, she shot down two enemy planes each day, and splashed a single one on the 27th.

On 1 July, Stern sailed for the West Coast of the United States, via Ulithi and Pearl Harbor. She arrived at San Pedro, Los Angeles, on the 25th. She sailed from that port on 20 October and proceeded, via the Panama Canal, to Norfolk, Virginia, for inactivation. By a directive issued in March 1946, Stern was to be sold as surplus to naval requirements. The sale was cancelled, and the escort was transferred to the Atlantic Reserve Fleet. She was placed in reserve, out of commission, on 26 April 1946 and berthed at Green Cove Springs, Florida.

=== Royal Netherlands Navy (1951-1967) ===
Stern was reactivated on 1 March 1951, and with five other destroyer escorts, transferred under the Military Assistance Program to the government of the Netherlands. Stern was struck from the Navy List on 7 March 1951. She served the government of the Netherlands as Hr.Ms. Van Zijll (F811) until she was returned to the custody of the United States Navy in 1967. In 1968, Stern was sold to Simons Scheepssloperij N.V., Rotterdam, and scrapped.

== Awards ==
Stern received three U.S. battle stars for World War II service.
