= Escort (band) =

American nu-disco band

- Origin: Brooklyn, New York City, New York, U.S.
- Genres: Nu-disco; post-disco
- Years active: 2006–present
- Labels: Escort Records
- Members: Nicki B; Eugene Cho; Jason "JKriv" Kriveloff
- Past members: Adeline Michèle; Dan Balis; Zena Kitt
- Website: weareescort.com

Escort is an American nu-disco band based out of Brooklyn, New York. Founded by Dan Balis, Eugene Cho and Darius Maghen including (previous) lead vocalist Adeline Michèle, they are known for their modern and live dance music sound.

Founders Dan Balis and Eugene Cho met at Vassar College and started making house singles in the early 2000s. Escort started as a studio project for the duo who, "wanted to make records in the spirit of the old ones we were sampling."

Despite being a self-proclaimed disco band they "are very careful to make music that doesn't just sound and feel old, but is actually relevant for DJs and listeners today." Their first single, "Starlight", was released to critical acclaim, which led to the band being invited to make their live debut at the P.S.1 Warm Up series. A flash mob of 300 dancers coordinated a group dance to Escort's remix of Feist's "I Feel It All" in the Eaton Center in Toronto for International Dance Day. Escort's "Starlight" was featured in DSW's (Designer Shoe Warehouse) fall 2013 commercial, "Savvy Shoe Lovers."

== Awards and recognition ==
- The video for "All Through the Night" was named as one of the top 50 videos of the 2000s by Pitchfork.
- The album Escort was listed at #40 on Rolling Stone's list of the top 50 albums of 2012, saying "Up-all-night civic pride rarely sounds so fun."

== Discography ==
=== Studio albums ===
List of studio albums
Title	Album details
Escort	Released: November 14, 2011; Label: Tirk Recordings, Escort Records; Format: CD, LP, digital download
Animal Nature	Released: October 30, 2015; Label: Escort Records; Format: CD, digital download
City Life	Released: April 12, 2019; Label: Escort Records; Format: Digital download

=== Compilation albums ===
List of studio albums
Title	Album details
Escort Remixed	Released: May 6, 2013; Label: No Static Recordings; Format: CD, digital download

=== Singles ===
List of singles as lead artist, showing year released and album name
Title	Year	Album
"Starlight"	2006	Escort
"Love in Indigo" / "Karawane"	2006	Escort
"A Bright New Life" / "All That She Is"	2007	Escort
"All Through the Night"	2007	Escort
"Cocaine Blues"	2010	Escort
"Caméleon Chameleon"	2011	Escort
"Barbarians"	2013	Animal Nature
"Cabaret"	2013	Animal Nature
"If You Say So" / "Actor out of Work"	2014	Animal Nature
"Animal Nature"	2015	Animal Nature
"Body Talk"	2015	Animal Nature
"Last Christmas"	2016	Non-album singles
"Slide"	2018	City Life
"Josephine"	2018	City Life
"City Life"	2019	City Life
"Ride"	2019	City Life
