= Prostitute (disambiguation) =

A prostitute is a person who engages in prostitution (human sexual behavior in exchange for money, goods or other reasons).

Prostitute or Prostitution may also refer to:

- Prostitute (1927 film), Soviet drama film
- Prostitute (1980 film), British film
- Prostitute (Alphaville album), 1994
- Prostitute, a Neuroticfish EP
- Prostitute (band)
- Prostitute (Toyah album), 1988
- "Prostitute" (song), by Guns N' Roses from the album Chinese Democracy
- The Prostitute, a 1937 novel by Ko Surangkhanang
- The Prostitutes, an indie band
- Prostitution (1919 film), German silent film
- Prostitution (1963 film), French film
