= F-class escort ship =

1930s German Navy fleet escort ship

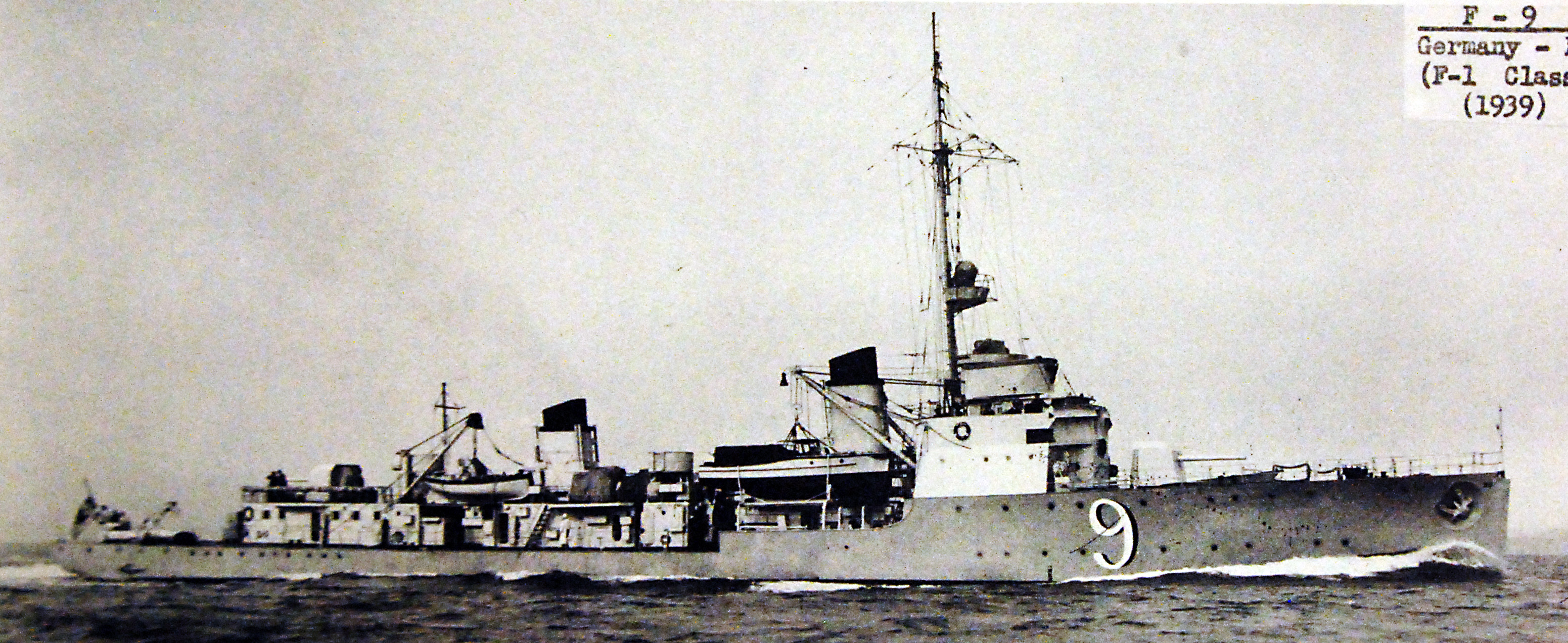
- F9, 1939

Class overview
- Operators: Kriegsmarine
- Built: 1936–1939
- In commission: 1936–1945
- Completed: 10
- Lost: 4
- Retired: 6

General characteristics (as built)
- Displacement: 712 t (701 long tons) (standard)
- Length: 75.94 m (249 ft 2 in)
- Beam: 8.80 m (28 ft 10 in)
- Draught: 3.24 m (10 ft 8 in)
- Installed power: 2 boilers; 10,000 kW (14,000 shp)
- Propulsion: 2 shafts; 2 geared steam turbines
- Speed: 28 knots (52 km/h; 32 mph)
- Complement: 121
- Armament: 2 × single 10.5 cm (4.1 in) guns; 2 × twin 3.7 cm (1.5 in) AA guns; 2 × single 2 cm (0.8 in) AA guns

The F-class escort ships were a multi-purpose class of 10 fleet escorts (Flottenbegleiter) built for the German Navy (Kriegsmarine) in the 1930s. During the Second World War, their unsatisfactory reliability and poor seakeeping abilities had them soon relegated to second-line duties in the Baltic Sea. Four ships were sunk during the war and the survivors were scrapped afterwards.

== Construction ==
The ships were built by Germaniawerft (F 1 – F 6), Kiel, Blohm & Voss (F 7, F 8) and Wilhelmshaven dockyard (F 9, F 10). They entered service between 1936 and 1939. Similar in size to the Type 35 and Type 37 torpedo-boats, the ships were originally conceived as fast fleet or convoy escort ships that could also perform anti-submarine and minesweeping work. They were also used as a test bed class for a new high-pressure steam power plant intended for use in destroyers.

As a class, they were overloaded and over-engined, which contributed to severe hull stress and very poor sea-keeping characteristics; these flaws were partially remedied by extensive rebuilds between 1938 and 1940. The power plants likewise proved to be prone to frequent breakdowns, and most of the ships were removed from operational service during the later years of the war after machinery failures meant the ships spent more time in repair than in use.

== Use and administration ==
With the exception of fleet service and convoy duties between 1939 and 1941, they spent most of the war in use as tenders or U-boat training ships. Between 1943 and 1945, the escort ships were grouped into five escort flotillas augmented by converted civilian craft as well as torpedo boats of the Torpedoboot Ausland program.

== Ships ==
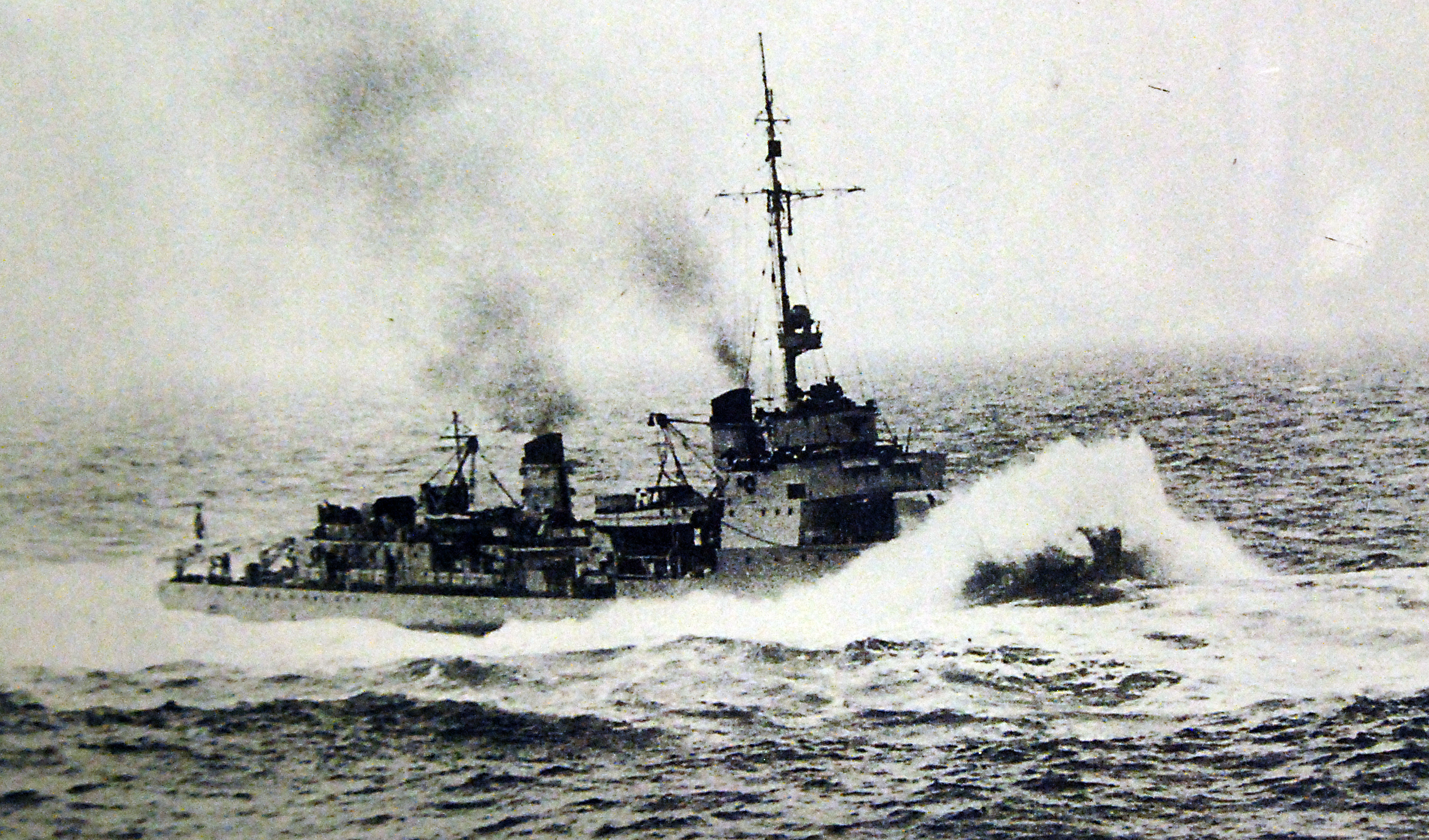
F-class ship in heavy weather

One ship, F 9, was sunk in December 1939 after being torpedoed by HMS Ursula. F 5 was damaged by a mine in the Baltic Sea and sank under tow 29 January 1945. F 3 was sunk by British aircraft 3 May 1945 and F 6 was sunk by US aircraft 30 March 1945. One was claimed to be the craft sunk in Tobruk Harbour by Native Military Corps Lance Corporal Job Maseko on July 21 1942, as a POW consigned to work as stevedore by the occupying Axis forces, for which he was eventually awarded the Military Medal, however none of this class were in the Mediterranean. The others survived the war and were scrapped or sunk as target ships.

== Bibliography ==
- Campbell, John (1985). Naval Weapons of World War II. Annapolis, Maryland: Naval Institute Press. ISBN 0-87021-459-4.
- Gröner, Erich (1990). German Warships 1815–1945: Major Surface Warships. Vol. I. Annapolis, Maryland: Naval Institute Press. ISBN 0-87021-790-9.
- Rohwer, Jürgen (2005). Chronology of the War at Sea 1939–1945: The Naval History of World War Two (3rd rev. ed.). Annapolis, Maryland: Naval Institute Press. ISBN 1-59114-119-2.
- Sieche, Erwin (1980). "Germany". In Chesneau, Roger (ed.). Conway's All the World's Fighting Ships 1922–1946. London: Conway Maritime Press. pp. 218–254. ISBN 0-85177-146-7.
- Whitley, Mike (1988). "F Boote of the Kriegsmarine". In Grant, Ian (ed.). Warship 45. London: Conway Maritime Press. pp. 16–22. ISBN 0-85177-472-5.
