= Mutual Defense Assistance Act =

United States law, part of the Marshall Plan

- Long title: An Act to promote the foreign policy and provide for the defense and general welfare of the United States by furnishing military assistance to foreign nations.
- Nicknames: Mutual Defense Assistance Act of 1949
- Enacted by: the 81st United States Congress
- Effective: October 6, 1949

Citations
- Public law: 81-329
- Statutes at Large: 63 Stat. 714

Codification
- Titles amended: 22 U.S.C.: Foreign Relations and Intercourse
- U.S.C. sections created: 22 U.S.C. ch. 20 § 1571 et seq.

Legislative history
- Introduced in the House as H.R. 5895 by John Kee (D–WV) on August 15, 1949; Committee consideration by House Foreign Affairs, Senate Foreign Relations; Passed the House on August 18, 1949 (238-122); Passed the Senate on September 22, 1949 (55-24); Reported by the joint conference committee on September 26, 1949; agreed to by the House on September 28, 1949 (224-109) and by the Senate on September 28, 1949 (Agreed); Signed into law by President Harry S. Truman on October 6, 1949

The Mutual Defense Assistance Act was a United States Act of Congress signed by President Harry S. Truman on October 6, 1949. For U.S. foreign policy, it was the first U.S. military foreign aid legislation of the Cold War era, and initially to Europe. The Act followed Truman's signing of the Economic Cooperation Act (the Marshall Plan), on April 3, 1948, which provided non-military, economic reconstruction and development aid to Europe.

The 1949 Act was amended and reauthorized on July 26, 1950. In 1951, the Economic Cooperation Act and Mutual Defense Assistance Act were succeeded by the Mutual Security Act, and its newly created independent agency, the Mutual Security Administration, to supervise all foreign aid programs, including both military assistance programs and non-military, economic assistance programs that bolstered the defense capability of U.S. allies.

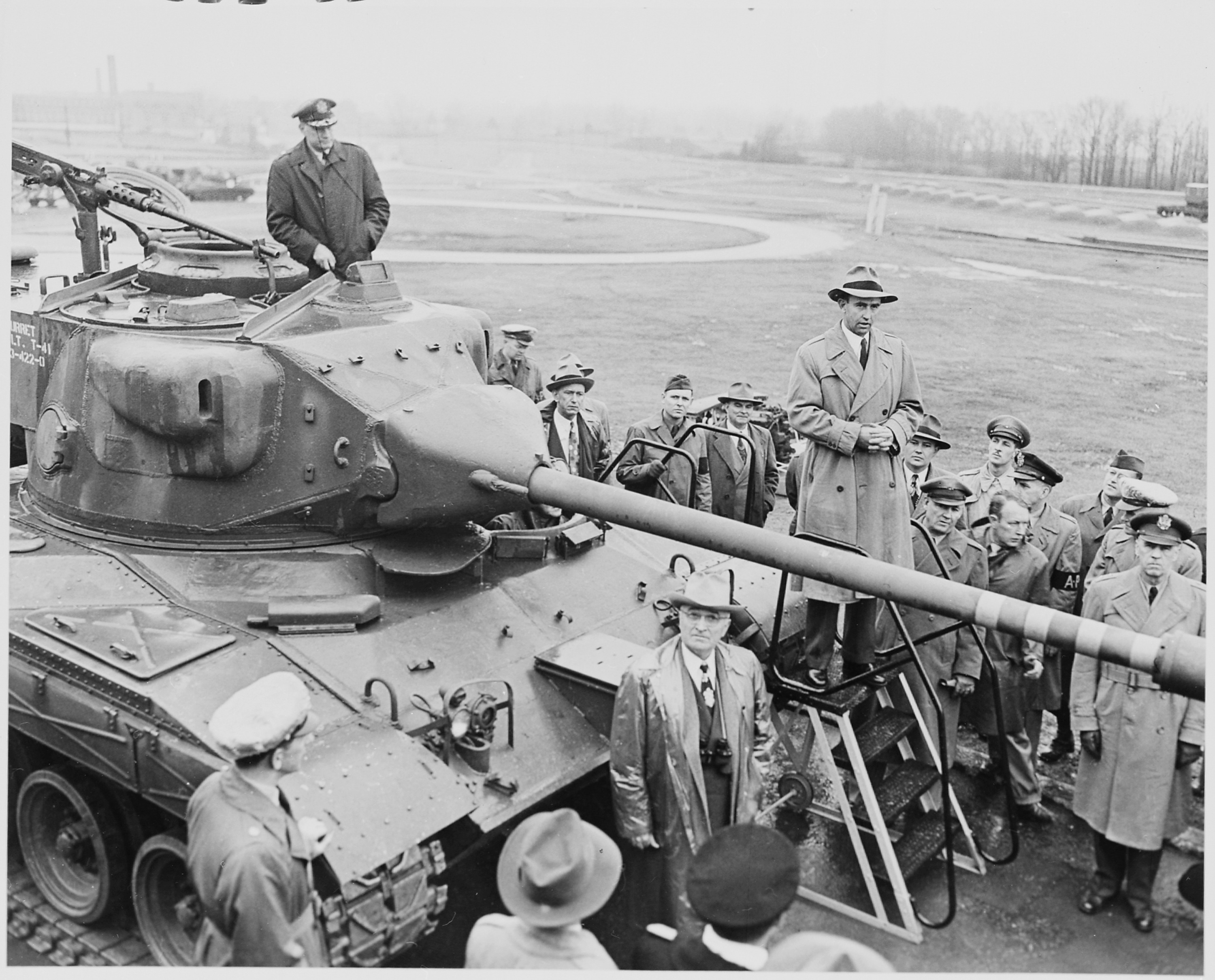
President Harry S. Truman inspecting a brand new M41 Walker Bulldog Prototype Tank. The MDAA allowed a much needed revival of the U.S. Armed Forces' equipment modernization program.

About the same time, the Mutual Defense Assistance Control Act of 1951, also known or referred to as the Battle Act, (65 Stat. 644; 22 U.S.C. 1611 et seq.) was also passed; it banned U.S. assistance to countries doing business with the Soviet Union and was so-named after its sponsor, Representative Laurie C. Battle of Alabama. Strong motivation for this "control" act also came from export control concerns, following their tightening by the Export Control Act of 1949 over Soviet advances; export controls were used for both domestic policy and later as an instrument of foreign policy. This is exemplified by the restrictions on export of certain strategic or military items to the Soviet bloc or to other countries which it felt, if permitted, would be detrimental to the foreign policy program of the U.S. This latter motive became so strong that it brought legislation directing the President to enlist the cooperation of other nations in enacting controls on trade with the Soviet bloc to parallel those of the United States. The benefits of the various economic and military aid programs were to be withheld from non-cooperating nations. The act covered a wide range of materials needed for the production of weapons, and was especially focused on anything that could aid atomic weapons research and construction.

As the Cold War developed, these acts were part of the American policy of containment of communism. They importantly provided defense assistance to any ally that might be attacked by the Soviet Union or one of its allies, while other programs provided non-military economic assistance. In Asia, the programs expanded with the newly established Maoist People's Republic of China, and other areas, with the development of specific country missions, including ones in Austria (1947–1950), China (1946–1948), Ireland (1948–1951), and Trieste (1947–1952).

== Historical background: the World War II aftermath and the Cold War ==
In the immediate aftermath of World War II, Western arsenals experienced significant depletion and wear. Public funds were primarily allocated to reconstruction efforts. Even the U.S. arsenal exhibited noticeable signs of shortages and deterioration. (Note: World War II-vintage German equipment was still in service in some European countries such as Spain (Pz IV and Stug III) and France. However, World War II vintage equipment was in service everywhere.)

Military officials began calling for the introduction of a new defense legislation in 1947, arguing that depleted inventories of surplus World War II-vintage armaments, piecemeal planning of new armaments and restrictions on presidential authority threatened current and future efforts to arm allied nations. New legislation became a necessity by mid-1948 with the negotiation of the North Atlantic Treaty and the necessity to provide military aid to strengthen the connectional defenses, having in mind a global resistance to Communist expansion of the signatories.

Truman sent a first bill to Congress on 25 July 1949, the day he ratified the North Atlantic Treaty but congressional opposition forced submission of a new legislation, which specified the recipients and the amounts of assistance. Administration planners believed the MDAA's immediate effects would be to raise the morale of friendly nations and prove U.S. reliability and resolve to meet Communist worldwide threats. The MDAA also institutionalized the concept of specific military aid programs, a result ensured by adoption of similar legislation in 1950 and an increase in annual spending on military aid to $5.222 billion after the outbreak of the Korean War – the very first large-scale test of the validity and practicability of the concept, if excepting the logistical support allowed to France during the First Indochina War.

== Mutual Assistance Program ==
The Mutual Defense Assistance Act created the Mutual Defense Assistance Program (MDAP), which became an integral component in the federal government's policy of containment of Soviet expansion. This program differed from the World War II-era Lend-Lease program in that it never needed refunding from the country that benefits any military assistance. Between 1950 and 1967, $33.4 billion in arms and services and $3.3 billion worth of surplus weaponry were provided under the program. This included sixteen Boeing B-29 strategic bombers, the first of which deployed to RAF Marham in East Anglia, in March 1950.

=== Europe: NATO ===
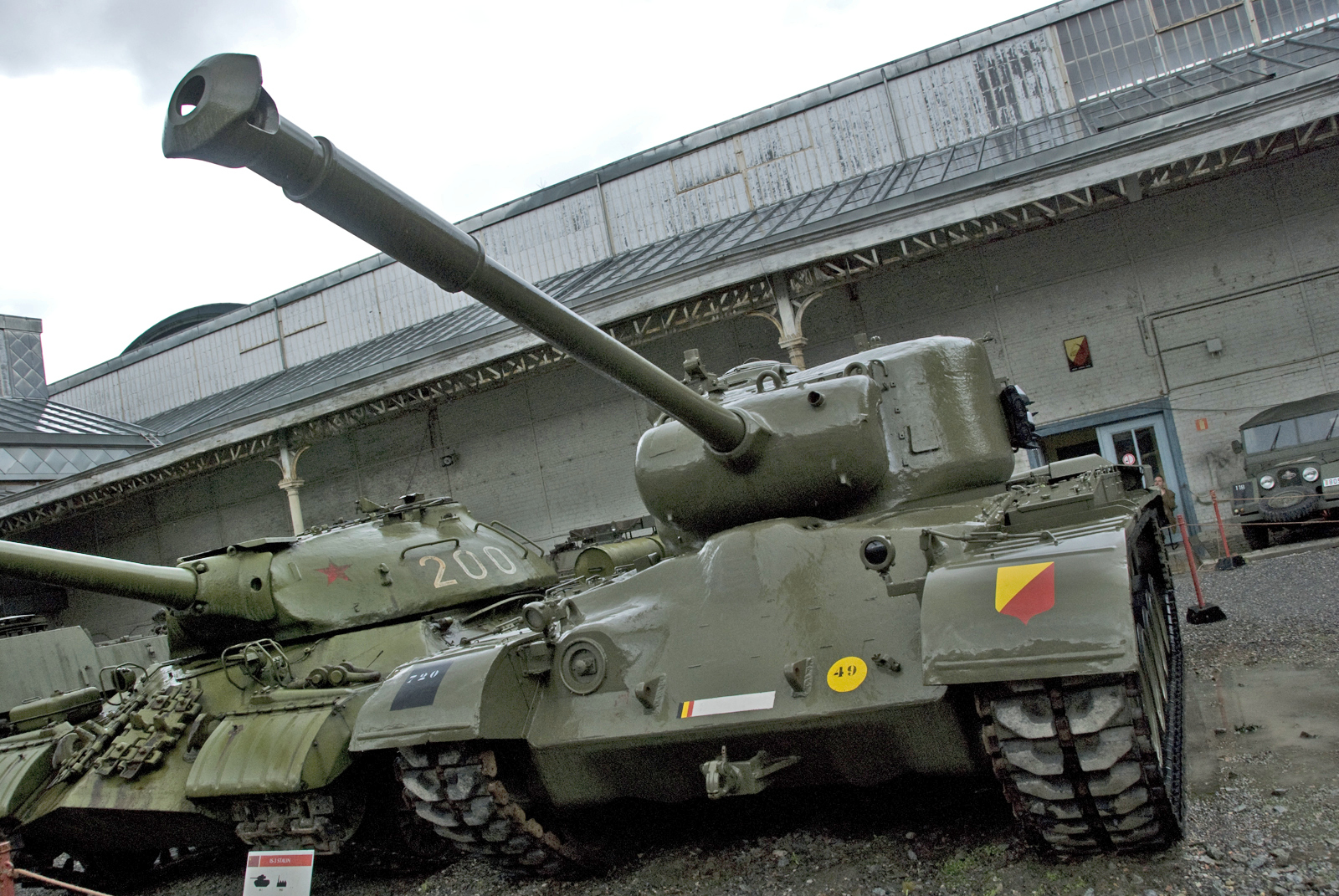
The Patton Tank family (here a Belgian M46) was the direct result of the revival of the late 1940s US armament modernization program framed by the MDAA

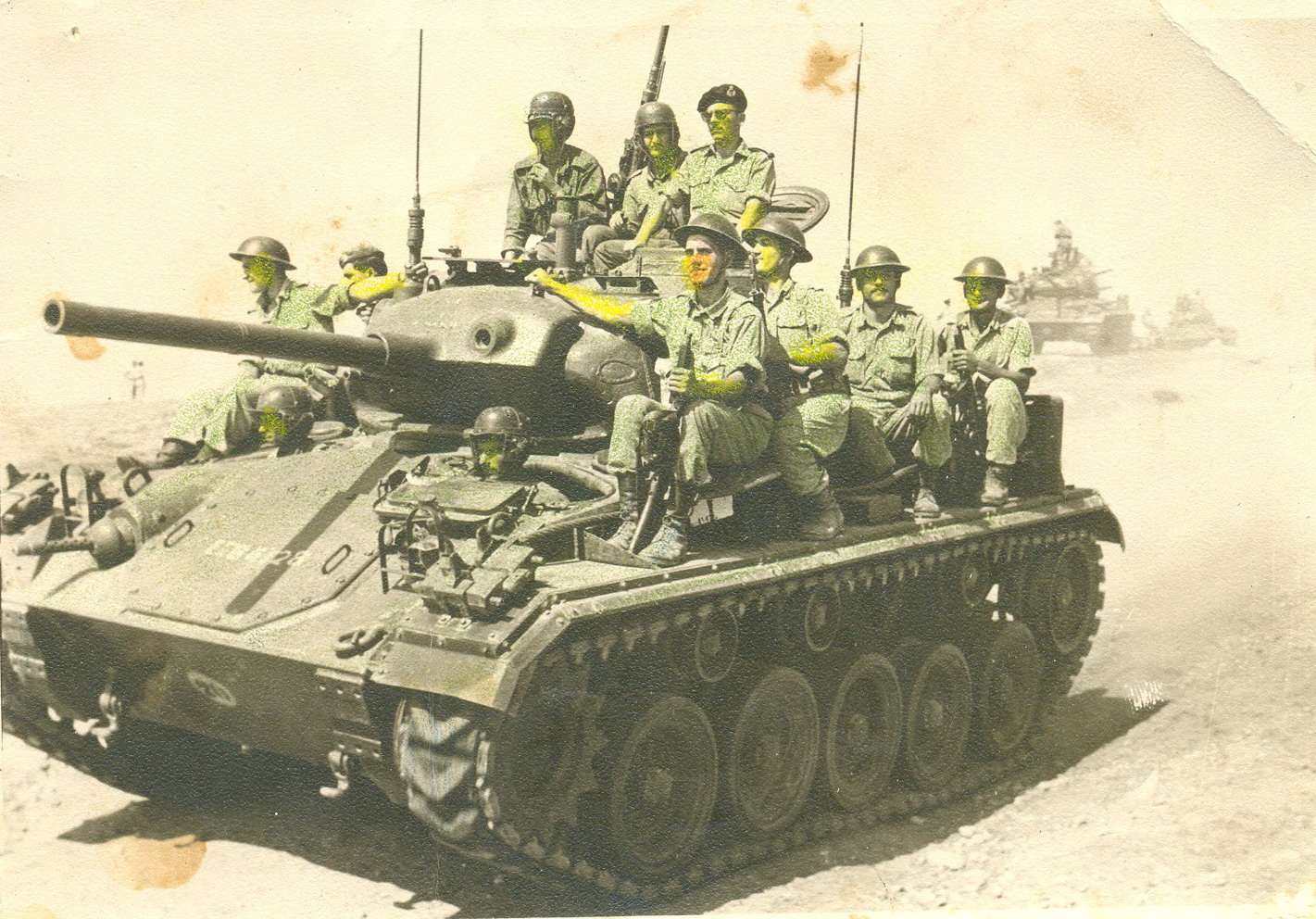
Greek US M24s Chaffee in 1956

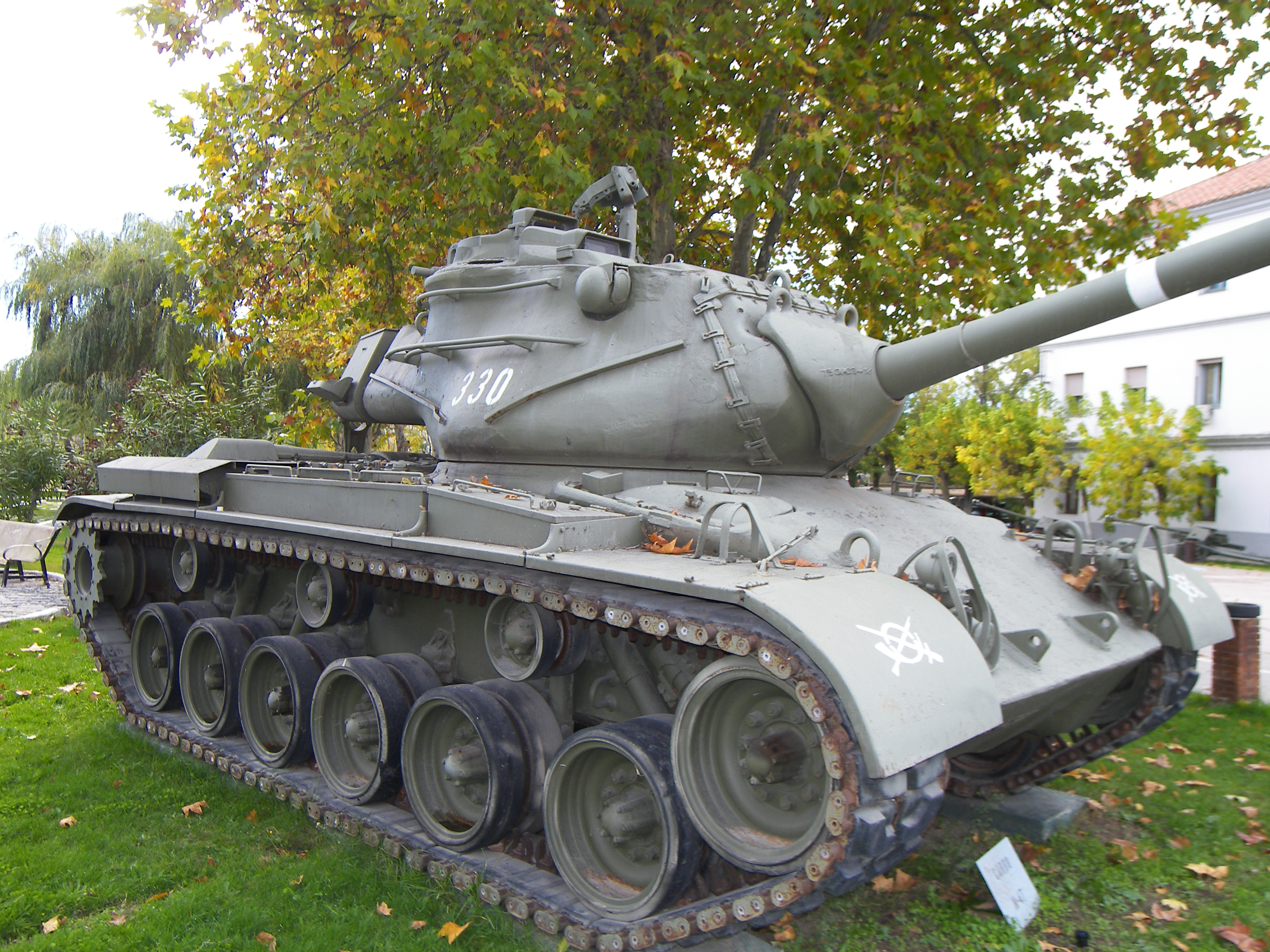
M47 Patton tank provided to Francoist Spain under NATO's MAP

On 4 April 1949, the foreign ministers from 12 countries signed the North Atlantic Treaty at the Departmental Auditorium in Washington D.C.: Belgium, Canada, Denmark, France, Iceland, Italy, Luxembourg, the Netherlands, Norway, Portugal, the United Kingdom, and the United States. Provision for enlargement was, however, given by Article 10 of the North Atlantic Treaty, which states that membership is open to any "European State in a position to further the principles of this Treaty and to contribute to the security of the North Atlantic area".

- Belgium and the Netherlands
- Denmark and Norway
- France

Massive support was negotiated with France from 1950 to 1954 when the French Union fought the Chinese and Soviet-backed Viet Minh during the First Indochina War. Support included substantial financial aid, material supply from the U.S. Army (uniforms, helmets, rifles, tanks), US Navy (aircraft carriers such as Belleau Wood/Bois Belleau), the U.S. Air Force (twelve Fairchild C-119, fighters, bombers, and maintenance crews) and the Central Intelligence Agency (CIA) (twenty four pilots of the Civil Air Transport) from which two pilots were killed in action during the battle of Dien Bien Phu.
American military support to France's rearmament lasted well into the 1950s, the French receiving furthermore equipment including M46 Pattons, F-84 Thunderjet, etc. but the divergence between the United States and the Anglo-French alliance during the Suez Crisis was to have decisive consequences on France-NATO relationships. Whereas the damage done to Anglo-American relations was quickly repaired, in the case of France, the situation remained more complex. France started to express reservations about the direction of Allied policy and U.S. leadership and, following his election as President in 1958, General Charles de Gaulle, in particular, made clear his dissatisfaction with aspects of this US prominent role, as well as, more specifically, with NATO's nuclear policy and NATO Military Command Structure. Although France was one of the very founding members of the Atlantic Alliance, President Charles de Gaulle withdrew France from NATO's military structure in 1966 in protest over American dominance of the Atlantic Alliance.

- Germany
- Greece
- Italy
- Portugal

On 4 April 1949, José Caeiro da Matta, Portuguese Minister for Foreign Affairs, signed the North Atlantic Treaty.

- Spain
- Turkey

=== Asia ===
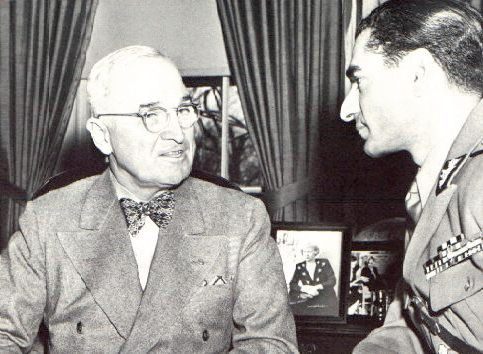
Mohammad Reza Shah Pahlavi and President Harry Truman, 1949

- Indochinese Peninsula after independence : Vietnam, Laos, ..
- Iran
- Japan

On 8 September 1951, the United States and Japan signed the Mutual Security Treaty, which stationed U.S. troops on Japanese soil for the defense of Japan following the eruption of the Korean War. On 8 March 1954, both countries signed the Mutual Defense Assistance Agreement (activated on 1 May 1954), focusing on defense assistance. It allowed for the presence of U.S. armed forces in Japan for the purpose of peace and security while encouraging Japan to take on more responsibility for its own defense, rearming in a manner suited for defensive purposes.

- Pakistan:

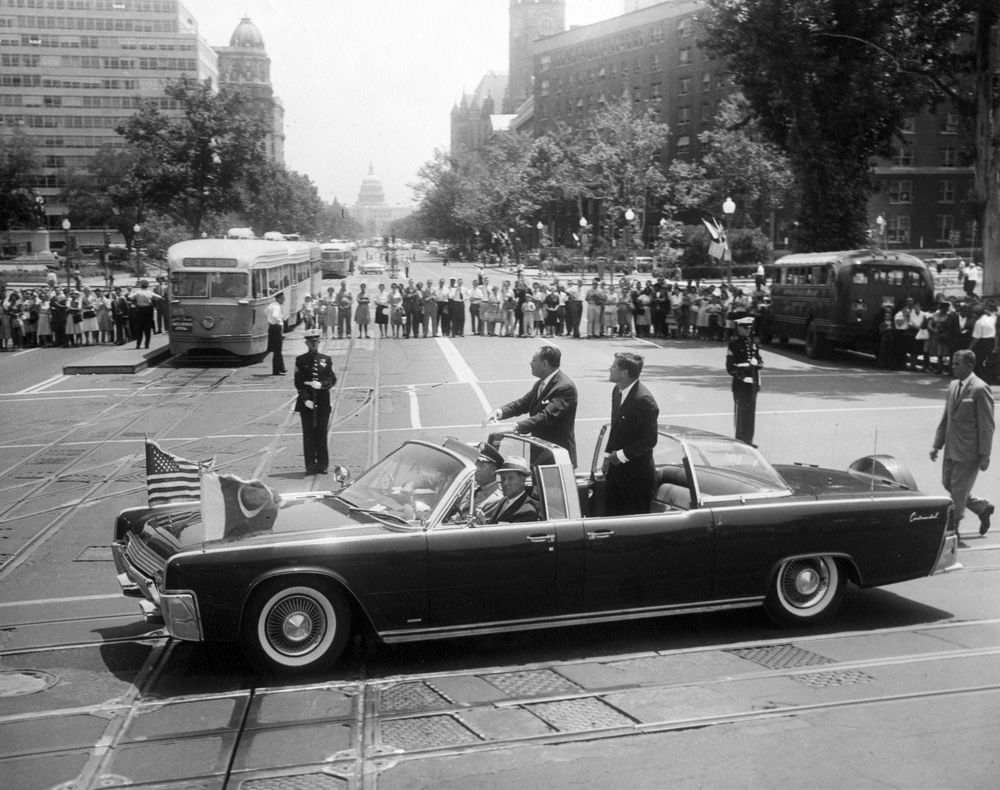
President Ayub Khan and President JF Kennedy's motorcade in 1961

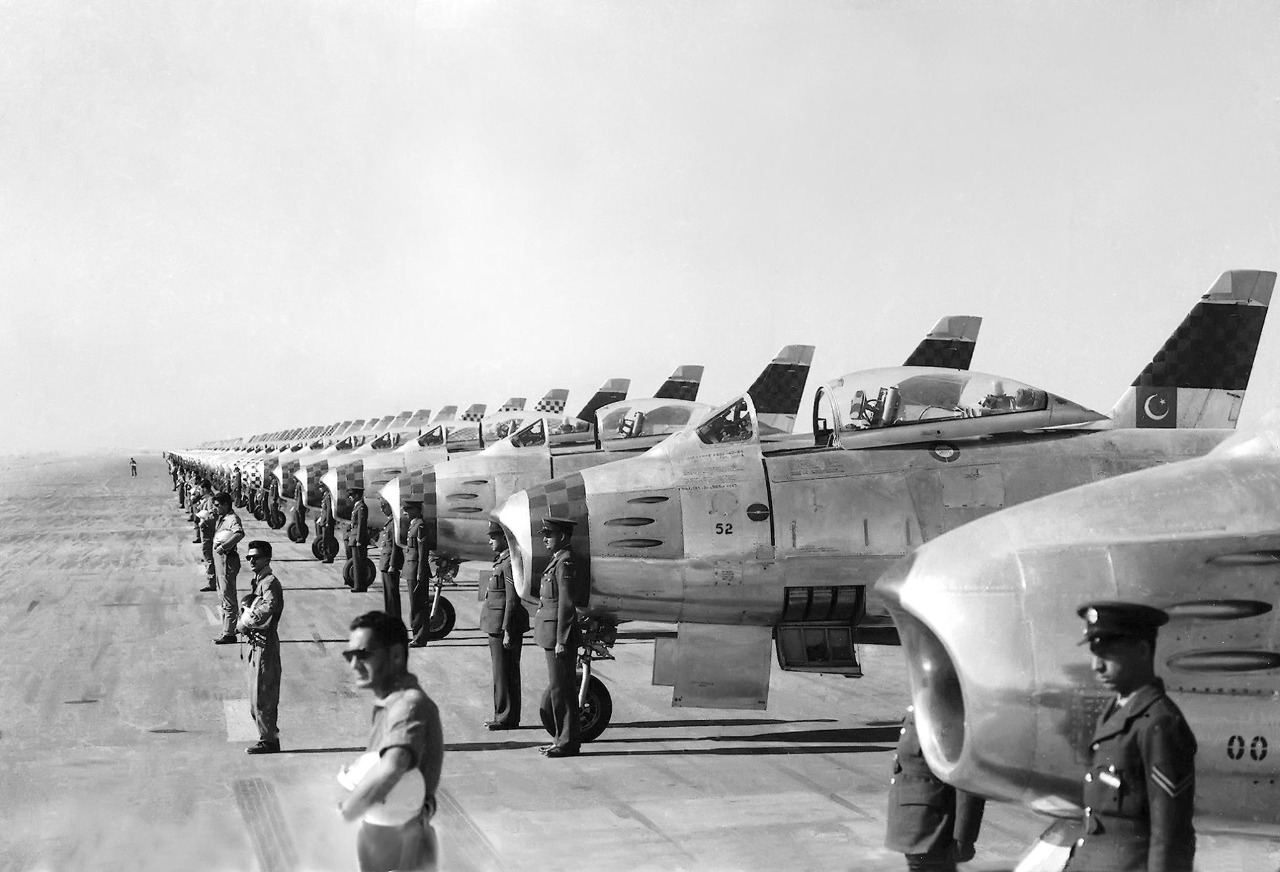
PAF F-86 Sabres at Mauripur

During the Korean War, Pakistan sided with the West in their fight against communism. By joining the CENTO & SEATO alliances, Pakistan officially became a Major non-NATO ally of the US under which it received aid financially and militarily through the Mutual Defense Assistance program to defend herself from Afghanistan and India which were being supported by the Soviets.

=== Nonaligned countries ===
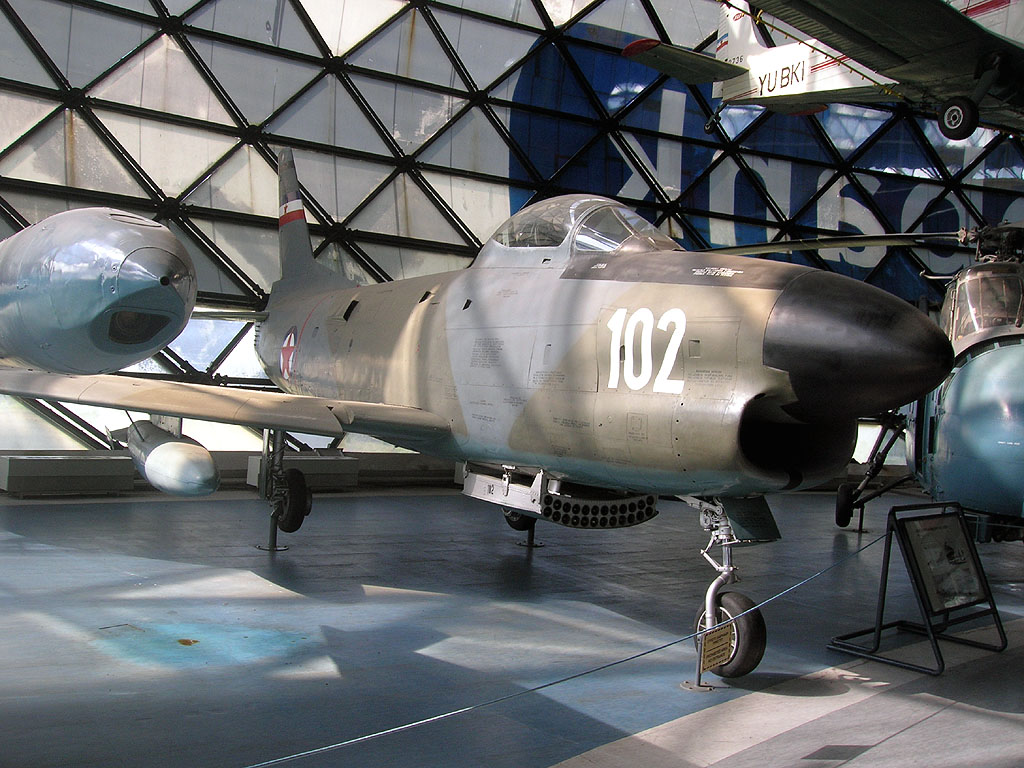
F-86D with Yugoslav markings, Belgrade Aviation Museum, Serbia.

The MDAA caused both a great deal of friction with the non-aligned countries and opportunities to tighten geopolitical relations with western countries and especially the United States.

- India

India refused to accept any American-imposed limits on its trade and proceeded with shipments of Thorium nitrate to China. Realizing that cutting off all aid to India would do more harm than good, Secretary of State John Foster Dulles negotiated a solution.

- Indonesia
- Yugoslavia:

Up to the early 1960s, the Yugoslav People's Army (JNA) had a large arsenal of German equipment, planes, and armor captured during the war, western materiel donated by the USA and Great Britain, as well as Soviet equipment.
Despite Josip Broz Tito's firm adherence to communism, because of the ideological (Note: Lasting from 1948, on the ground of an Inform-buro Resolution) and personal conflict with Joseph Stalin, the Soviet Union—and thereafter all the Warsaw Pact's pro-Soviet governments—denounced his treaty of friendship with Yugoslavia on September 27, 1949. During this period, Yugoslavia perceived a serious threat of intervention by its former allies and thus accepted American and British offers of assistance. Discussions even took place regarding Yugoslavia's possible inclusion in the North Atlantic Treaty Organization (NATO). Consequently, the Yugoslav armed forces received standard NATO military equipment and arms during this period, such as the North American F-86 Sabre and Republic F-84 Thunderjet jet fighters, and M36 Jackson and M18 Hellcat tank destroyers. After Stalin's death and the political and ideological reconciliation with the Soviet Union, the Yugoslav People's Army later exclusively imported their equipment from the USSR when not sourcing it internally.

== Bibliography ==
- Collective: Organizing the world: the United States and regional cooperation in Asia and Europe Galia Press-Barnathan (2003):
- Dimitrijevic, Bojan (1997). "The mutual defense aid program in Tito's Yugoslavia, 1951–1958, and its technical impact". Journal of Slavic Military Studies. 10 (2): 19–33. doi:10.1080/13518049708430288.
- Carlos Caballero Jurado and Nigel Thomas : Central American Wars 1959-1980 (illustrated by Simon McCouaig) Osprey Publishing MEN-AT-ARM Serie n°221, 1990
- Lawrence S. Kaplan: A Community of Interests: NATO and the Military Assistance Program, 1948–1951 (1980);
- Chester J. Pach, Jr.: Arming the Free World: The Origins of the United States Military Assistance Program, 1945–1950 (1991);
- Ronald E. Powaski: Toward an entangling alliance: American isolationism, internationalism, and Europe, 1901–1950 (1991);
- Alejandro de Quesada : The Bay of Pigs – Cuba 1961 ( illustrated by Stephen Walsh ) – Osprey Publishing – Elite Serie n°166, 2009.
- Vox the Belgian armed forces magazine
- further related bibliography ( incl. texts, digests, extracts ) on US international politic and diplomacy at : 0-313-27274-3&id=ZDAoVZqHwocC&hl=en&source=gbs_similarbooks_s&cad=1 Books.google.be Library
